= Barcelona metropolitan area =

- urban area
- Satellite image of the Barcelona metropolitan area
- Interactive map of Barcelona metropolitan area
- Country: Spain
- Region: Catalonia
- Core city: Barcelona

Area
  - Metro: 4,268 km^{2} (1,648 sq mi)

Population
  - Metro: 5,797,356 ▲
  - Metro density: 1,250/km^{2} (3,200/sq mi)

GDP
  - Metro: €173.722 billion (2021)
  - Per capita: €29,966 (2021)
- Time zone: UTC+1 (CET)

The Barcelona metropolitan area is a metropolitan area in Catalonia (Spain), centred around the city of Barcelona and located less than 100 km south of the border with France. With a population of over 5 million, it is one of the largest urban areas in Europe.

== Overview ==
The urban area – the core of the metropolitan area – of Barcelona has a population of 4,604,000, being the fifth-most populous urban area in the European Union after Paris, the Ruhr area, Madrid and Milan. The Larger Urban Zone has a population of 4,440,629 according to Eurostat.

As stated by the Department of Economic and Social Affairs of United Nations, the metropolitan area of Barcelona has a population of 5,083,000, according to the Organisation for Economic Co-operation and Development it has a population of 4,900,000 and according to the Eurostat it has a population of 5,797,356. According to Idescat it has a population of 5,029,181, according to BlatantWorld.com it has a population of 4,992,778 and according to World Gazetteer it has a population of 5,068,252.

== The Zones ==
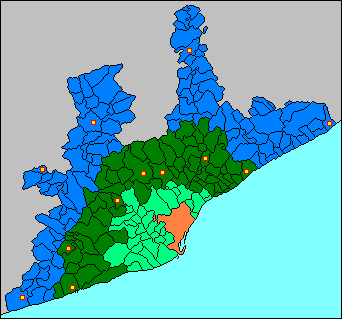
Barcelona metropolitan area

	Population	Area (km^{2})	Density/km^{2}
Barcelona	1,621,537	101	15,793
First Zone	1,598,534	532	2,923
Second Zone	1,481,937	1,362	1,070
Third Zone	747,810	2,273	329
	5,355,127	4,268	1,255

- First Zone: consists of other municipalities (outside Barcelona) in an official union of adjacent cities and municipalities called the Àrea Metropolitana de Barcelona (AMB) (also Greater Barcelona) with a population of 3,220,071 in area of 636 km^{2} (density 5,010 hab/km^{2}).
- Second Zone: considered as urban and metropolitan adjacent area. It forms a belt of cities: Vilanova i la Geltrú, Vilafranca del Penedès, Martorell, Terrassa, Sabadell, Granollers, Mataró and their respective areas of influence. The Generalitat projects the interconnection by means the Orbital Railway Line.
- Third Zone: considered territory of consolidated expansion. In this one the expansion passes to be of radial type, spreading across fluvial corridors or depressions, as in case of Manresa, Igualada and Vic, or continuing the coast, as in case of Blanes and El Vendrell.

== Polynuclear Urban Region ==
P.U.R. of Barcelona

	Population	Area (km^{2})	Density/km^{2}
Barcelona metro	5,355,127	4,268	1,255
Tarragona Area	411,876	656	628
Girona Area	336,218	1,081	311
	6,103,221	6,005	1,016

According to the EURBANET project by Delft University of Technology it speaks about polynuclear urban region when there exists a series of important urban centers that relate intensely among them and to the exterior. This one is the case of bordering zones to the urban region that they extend around the cities of Tarragona and Girona. They are areas with a great economic dependence and services to the capital. They are narrow corridors well communicated to Barcelona, both by highway and railroad, which there fuse the metropolitan areas of these cities with the urban region. The PUR of Barcelona comprises 6,103,221 people in an area of 6,005 km^{2}.

Barcelona Polynuclear Urban Region is conceived as "isolated islands of significant growth" which, may develop into zones of global economic integration. This is, however, not intended to happen at the cost of the global competitive position of the present core area.

== Municipalities of metropolitan area - population and area ==
=== First zone ===
- Barcelona 1,621,537 hab. / 101,4 km^{2}
- L'Hospitalet de Llobregat 257,038 hab. / 12,5 km^{2}
- Badalona 219,547 hab. / 21,2 km^{2}
- Santa Coloma de Gramenet 119,717 hab. / 7 km^{2}
- Sant Cugat del Vallès 87,118 hab. / 48 km^{2}
- Cornellà de Llobregat 86,519 hab. / 7 km^{2}
- Sant Boi de Llobregat 82,428 hab. / 22 km^{2}
- Viladecans 63,489 hab. / 20 km^{2}
- El Prat de Llobregat 63,418 hab. / 31 km^{2}
- Castelldefels 62,080 hab. / 13 km^{2}
- Cerdanyola del Vallès 58,747 hab. / 32 km^{2}
- Esplugues de Llobregat 46,862 hab. / 5 km^{2}
- Gavà 45,994 hab. / 31 km^{2}

- Sant Feliu de Llobregat 42,919 hab. / 12 km^{2}
- Ripollet 37,088 hab. / 4 km^{2}
- Sant Adrià de Besòs 33,761 hab. / 4 km^{2}
- Montcada i Reixac 33,453 hab. / 23 km^{2}
- Sant Joan Despí 32,030 hab. / 6 km^{2}
- Barberà del Vallès 31,144 hab. / 6 km^{2}
- Sant Vicenç dels Horts 27,701 hab. / 9 km^{2}
- Sant Andreu de la Barca 26,401 hab. / 6 km^{2}
- Molins de Rei 24,067 hab. / 16 km^{2}
- Sant Just Desvern 15,811 hab. / 8 km^{2}
- Badia del Vallès 13,679 hab. / 1 km^{2}

- Corbera de Llobregat 13,843 hab. / 18 km^{2}
- Castellbisbal 11,977 hab. / 31 km^{2}
- Pallejà 11,134 hab. / 8 km^{2}
- Montgat 10,270 hab. / 3 km^{2}
- Cervelló 8,393 hab. / 22 km^{2}
- Santa Coloma de Cervelló 7,744 hab. / 7 km^{2}
- Tiana 7,590 hab. / 8 km^{2}
- Begues 6,271 hab. / 50 km^{2}
- Torrelles de Llobregat 5,430 hab. / 14 km^{2}
- El Papiol 3,900 hab. / 9 km^{2}
- Sant Climent de Llobregat 3,779 hab. / 11 km^{2}
- La Palma de Cervelló 3,057 hab. / 5 km^{2}

=== Second zone ===
- Abrera 10,840 hab. / 20 km^{2}
- Alella 8,998 hab. / 10 km^{2}
- L'Ametlla del Vallès 7,632 hab. / 14 km^{2}
- Argentona 11,402 hab. / 25 km^{2}
- Avinyonet del Penedès 1,588 hab. / 29 km^{2}
- Cabrera de Mar 4,269 hab. / 9 km^{2}
- Cabrils 6,698 hab. / 7 km^{2}
- Caldes de Montbui 16,159 hab. / 38 km^{2}
- Canovelles 15,704 hab. / 7 km^{2}
- Canyelles 3,783 hab. / 14 km^{2}
- Cardedeu 15,775 hab. / 12 km^{2}
- Castellar del Vallès 22,007 hab. / 45 km^{2}
- Castellví de Rosanes 1,576 hab. / 16 km^{2}
- Cubelles 12,773 hab. / 14 km^{2}
- Esparraguera 21,260 hab. / 27 km^{2}
- Les Franqueses del Vallès 15,775 hab. / 30 km^{2}
- La Garriga 14,183 hab. / 19 km^{2}
- Gelida 6,151 hab. / 27 km^{2}
- La Granada 1,866 hab. / 6 km^{2}
- Granollers 60,658 hab. / 15 km^{2}
- La Llagosta 13,517 hab. / 3 km^{2}
- Lliçà d'Amunt 13,491 hab. / 22 km^{2}
- Lliçà de Vall 6,088 hab. / 11 km^{2}
- Martorell 25,844 hab. / 13 km^{2}
- Martorelles 4,893 hab. / 4 km^{2}
- El Masnou 21,935 hab. / 3 km^{2}

- Masquefa 7,747 hab. / 17 km^{2}
- Matadepera 8,266 hab. / 25 km^{2}
- Mataró 121,722 hab. / 22 km^{2}
- Mollet del Vallès 51,365 hab. / 11 km^{2}
- Montmeló 8,873 hab. / 4 km^{2}
- Montornès del Vallès 14,723 hab. / 10 km^{2}
- Olèrdola 3,280 hab. / 30 km^{2}
- Olesa de Montserrat 22,257 hab. / 17 km^{2}
- Olivella 2,842 hab. / 39 km^{2}
- Òrrius 487 hab. / 6 km^{2}
- Palau-solità i Plegamans 13,594 hab. / 15 km^{2}
- Parets del Vallès 16,720 hab. / 9 km^{2}
- Polinyà 7,105 hab. / 9 km^{2}
- Premià de Dalt 9,788 hab. / 7 km^{2}
- Premià de Mar 27,590 hab. / 2 km^{2}
- Rellinars 658 hab. / 18 km^{2}
- Rubí 70,006 hab. / 32 km^{2}
- La Roca del Vallès 9,656 hab. / 37 km^{2}
- Sabadell 206,493 hab. / 38 km^{2}
- Sant Cugat Sesgarrigues 927 hab. / 6 km^{2}
- Sant Esteve Sesrovires 6,704 hab. / 19 km^{2}
- Sant Feliu de Codines 5,495 hab. / 15 km^{2}
- Sant Fost de Campsentelles 7,656 hab. / 13 km^{2}

- Sant Llorenç d'Hortons 2,219 hab. / 20 km^{2}
- Sant Pere de Ribes 27,509 hab. / 41 km^{2}
- Sant Quirze del Vallès 17,819 hab. / 14 km^{2}
- Sant Sadurní d'Anoia 11,790 hab. / 19 km^{2}
- Santa Eulàlia de Ronçana 6,458 hab. / 14 km^{2}
- Santa Fe del Penedès 366 hab. / 3 km^{2}
- Santa Maria de Martorelles 806 hab. / 4 km^{2}
- Santa Perpètua de Mogoda 23,443 hab. / 16 km^{2}
- Sentmenat 7,376 hab. / 28 km^{2}
- Sitges 27,668 hab. / 44 km^{2}
- Subirats 3,008 hab. / 56 km^{2}
- Teià 5,969 hab. / 7 km^{2}
- Terrassa 210,941 hab. / 70 km^{2}
- Ullastrell 1,687 hab. / 7 km^{2}
- Vacarisses 5,431 hab. / 41 km^{2}
- Vallirana 13,326 hab. / 24 km^{2}
- Vallromanes 2,204 hab. / 11 km^{2}
- Viladecavalls 7,079 hab. / 20 km^{2}
- Vilafranca del Penedès 36,656 hab. / 20 km^{2}
- Vilanova del Vallès 4,121 hab. / 15 km^{2}
- Vilanova i la Geltrú 63,196 hab. / 34 km^{2}
- Vilassar de Dalt 8,476 hab. / 9 km^{2}
- Vilassar de Mar 19,052 hab. / 4 km^{2}

=== Third zone ===
- Aiguafreda 2,375 hab. / 8 km^{2}
- L'Arboç 5,063 hab. / 14 km^{2}
- Arenys de Mar 14,164 hab. / 6 km^{2}
- Arenys de Munt 7,807 hab. / 21 km^{2}
- Artés 5,179 hab. / 18 km^{2}
- Balenyà 3,581 hab. / 17 km^{2}
- Balsareny 3,410 hab. / 37 km^{2}
- Banyeres del Penedès 2,696 hab. / 12 km^{2}
- Bellvei 1,840 hab. / 8 km^{2}
- Bigues i Riells 7,807 hab. / 28 km^{2}
- Blanes 38,368 hab. / 18 km^{2}
- Breda 3,707 hab. / 5 km^{2}
- El Bruc 1,743 hab. / 47 km^{2}
- El Brull 227 hab. / 41 km^{2}
- Les Cabanyes 842 hab. / 1 km^{2}
- Cabrera d'Anoia 1,192 hab. / 17 km^{2}
- Calafell 21,871 hab. / 20 km^{2}
- Calders 868 hab. / 33 km^{2}
- Caldes d'Estrac 2,672 hab. / 1 km^{2}
- Calella 18,034 hab. / 8 km^{2}
- Calldetenes 2,252 hab. / 6 km^{2}
- Callús 1,610 hab. / 29 km^{2}
- Canet de Mar 13,181 hab. / 4,5 km^{2}
- Capellades 5,386 hab. / 3 km^{2}
- Carme 811 hab. / 11 km^{2}
- Castellet i la Gornal 2,044 hab. / 47 km^{2}
- Castellgalí 1,611 hab. / 17 km^{2}
- Castellnou de Bages 907 hab. / 29 km^{2}
- Castellbell i el Vilar 3,479 hab. / 45 km^{2}
- Castellví de la Marca 1,603 hab. / 29 km^{2}
- Centelles 6,909 hab. / 15 km^{2}
- Collbató 3,780 hab. / 18 km^{2}
- Cunit 11,102 hab. / 10 km^{2}
- Dosrius 4,658 hab. / 41 km^{2}
- Figaró-Montmany 1,009 hab. / 15 km^{2}
- Fogars de la Selva 1,437 hab. / 32 km^{2}
- Folgueroles 2,058 hab. / 10 km^{2}
- Font-rubí 1,430 hab. / 37 km^{2}

- Gualba 1,065 hab. / 23 km^{2}
- Gurb 2,344 hab. / 52 km^{2}
- Els Hostalets de Pierola 2,219 hab. / 34 km^{2}
- Hostalric 3,773 hab. / 3 km^{2}
- Igualada 36,923 hab. / 8 km^{2}
- Llinars del Vallès 8,581 hab. / 28 km^{2}
- Malgrat de Mar 17,822 hab. / 9 km^{2}
- Malla 267 hab. / 11 km^{2}
- Manlleu 20,091 hab. / 17 km^{2}
- Manresa 73,140 hab. / 42 km^{2}
- Marganell 292 hab. / 13 km^{2}
- Les Masies de Voltregà 3,152 hab. / 22 km^{2}
- Monistrol de Montserrat 2,903 hab. / 12 km^{2}
- Navarcles 5,732 hab. / 6 km^{2}
- Olesa de Bonesvalls 1,556 hab. / 31 km^{2}
- Pacs del Penedès 831 hab. / 6 km^{2}
- Palafolls 8,061 hab. / 16 km^{2}
- Piera 13,652 hab. / 57 km^{2}
- Pineda de Mar 25,568 hab. / 10 km^{2}
- El Pla del Penedès 891 hab. / 9 km^{2}
- La Pobla de Claramunt 2,192 hab. / 19 km^{2}
- El Pont de Vilomara i Rocafort 3,521 hab. / 28 km^{2}
- Puigdàlber 449 hab. / 1 km^{2}
- Riells i Viabrea 3,465 hab. / 26 km^{2}
- Roda de Ter 5,671 hab. / 2 km^{2}
- Sallent 7,146 hab. / 66 km^{2}
- Sant Andreu de Llavaneres 9,745 hab. / 12 km^{2}
- Sant Antoni de Vilamajor 5,091 hab. / 14 km^{2}
- Sant Cebrià de Vallalta 3,075 hab. / 16 km^{2}
- Sant Celoni 15,992 hab. / 65 km^{2}
- Sant Esteve de Palautordera 2,245 hab. / 11 km^{2}
- Sant Fruitós de Bages 7,448 hab. / 22 km^{2}
- Sant Hipòlit de Voltregà 3,379 hab. / 1 km^{2}
- Sant Iscle de Vallalta 1,193 hab. / 18 km^{2}
- Sant Joan de Vilatorrada 10,474 hab. / 16 km^{2}
- Sant Martí de Centelles 941 hab. / 25 km^{2}

- Sant Martí Sarroca 2,997 hab. / 35 km^{2}
- Sant Pere de Riudebitlles 2,319 hab. / 5 km^{2}
- Sant Pere de Vilamajor 3,728 hab. / 35 km^{2}
- Sant Pol de Mar 4,904 hab. / 8 km^{2}
- Sant Quintí de Mediona 2,131 hab. / 14 km^{2}
- Sant Quirze Safaja 629 hab. / 26 km^{2}
- Sant Salvador de Guardiola 2,970 hab. / 37 km^{2}
- Sant Vicenç de Castellet 8,096 hab. / 17 km^{2}
- Sant Vicenç de Montalt 5,267 hab. / 8 km^{2}
- Sant Vicenç de Torelló 1,958 hab. / 7 km^{2}
- Santa Cecília de Voltregà 189 hab. / 9 km^{2}
- Santa Eugènia de Berga 2,194 hab. / 7 km^{2}
- Santa Margarida de Montbui 9,825 hab. / 28 km^{2}
- Santa Margarida i els Monjos 6,459 hab. / 17 km^{2}
- Santa Maria de Palautordera 8,235 hab. / 17 km^{2}
- Santa Oliva 2,988 hab. / 9 km^{2}
- Santa Susanna 3,019 hab. / 13 km^{2}
- Santpedor 6,557 hab. / 17 km^{2}
- Seva 3,191 hab. / 31 km^{2}
- Suria 6,369 hab. / 24 km^{2}
- Tagamanent 301 hab. / 43 km^{2}
- Talamanca 140 hab. / 29 km^{2}
- Taradell 5,864 hab. / 26 km^{2}
- Tona 7,578 hab. / 16 km^{2}
- Tordera 14,017 hab. / 84 km^{2}
- Torelló 13,449 hab. / 14 km^{2}
- La Torre de Claramunt 3,466 hab. / 15 km^{2}
- Torrelavit 1,275 hab. / 24 km^{2}
- Vallbona d'Anoia 1,337 hab. / 6 km^{2}
- Vallgorguina 2,193 hab. / 22 km^{2}
- El Vendrell 33,340 hab. / 37 km^{2}
- Vic 38,321 hab. / 31 km^{2}
- Vilalba Sasserra 588 hab. / 6 km^{2}
- Vilanova del Camí 12,208 hab. / 10 km^{2}
- Vilobí del Penedès 1,071 hab. / 9 km^{2}

== Municipalities of Polynuclear Urban Region - population and area ==
=== Tarragona area ===
- Albinyana 2,200 hab. / 19 km^{2}
- Alcover 4,731 hab. / 46 km^{2}
- Altafulla 4,415 hab. / 7 km^{2}
- Bonastre 584 hab. / 25 km^{2}
- Cambrils 29,112 hab. / 35 km^{2}
- El Catllar 3,751 hab. / 26 km^{2}
- Constantí 6,183 hab. / 31 km^{2}
- Creixell 2,952 hab. / 11 km^{2}
- Els Garidells 198 hab. / 3 km^{2}
- La Masó 287 hab. / 4 km^{2}
- El Milà 177 hab. / 4 km^{2}

- El Morell 2,855 hab. / 6 km^{2}
- La Nou de Gaià 461 hab. / 4 km^{2}
- Els Pallaresos 3,538 hab. / 5 km^{2}
- Perafort 996 hab. / 10 km^{2}
- La Pobla de Mafumet 1,734 hab. / 12 km^{2}
- La Pobla de Montornès 2,568 hab. / 12 km^{2}
- Reus 104,835 hab. / 53 km^{2}
- La Riera de Gaià 1,453 hab. / 9 km^{2}
- Riudoms 6,149 hab. / 32 km^{2}
- Roda de Barà 5,586 hab. / 16 km^{2}
- El Rourell 362 hab. / 2 km^{2}
- Salomó 445 hab. / 12 km^{2}

- Salou 23,398 hab. / 15 km^{2}
- La Secuita 1,363 hab. / 18 km^{2}
- La Selva del Camp 5,097 hab. / 35 km^{2}
- Tarragona 134,163 hab. / 63 km^{2}
- Torredembarra 14,524 hab. / 9 km^{2}
- Vallmoll 1,529 hab. / 17 km^{2}
- Valls 23,948 hab. / 55 km^{2}
- Vespella de Gaià 379 hab. / 18 km^{2}
- Vilallonga del Camp 1,631 hab. / 9 km^{2}
- Vila-seca 18,678 hab. / 22 km^{2}
- Vinyols i els Arcs 1,594 hab. / 11 km^{2}

=== Girona area ===
- Aiguaviva 614 hab. / 14 km^{2}
- Begur 4,086 hab. / 20 km^{2}
- Bescanó 4,121 hab. / 36 km^{2}
- Brunyola 365 hab. / 37 km^{2}
- Caldes de Malavella 6,067 hab. / 57 km^{2}
- Calonge 10,009 hab. / 34 km^{2}
- Campllong 400 hab. / 9 km^{2}
- Cassà de la Selva 8,994 hab. / 46 km^{2}
- Castell-Platja d'Aro 9,766 hab. / 22 km^{2}
- Celrà 3,947 hab. / 19 km^{2}
- Fornells de la Selva 1,971 hab. / 12 km^{2}

- Girona 92,186 hab. / 39 km^{2}
- Llagostera 7,314 hab. / 76 km^{2}
- Llambilles 641 hab. / 15 km^{2}
- Lloret de Mar 34,997 hab. / 49 km^{2}
- Maçanet de la Selva 6,254 hab. / 45 km^{2}
- Mont-ras 1,859 hab. / 12 km^{2}
- Palafrugell 21,412 hab. / 27 km^{2}
- Palamós 17,400 hab. / 14 km^{2}
- Quart 2,618 hab. / 38 km^{2}
- Riudarenes 1,853 hab. / 48 km^{2}
- Riudellots de la Selva 1,877 hab. / 13 km^{2}
- Salt 27,673 hab. / 7 km^{2}

- Sant Andreu Salou 161 hab. / 6 km^{2}
- Sant Feliu de Guíxols 21,155 hab. / 16 km^{2}
- Sant Gregori 3,006 hab. / 49 km^{2}
- Sant Julià de Ramis 2,866 hab. / 19 km^{2}
- Santa Coloma de Farners 11,090 hab. / 71 km^{2}
- Santa Cristina d'Aro 4,547 hab. / 68 km^{2}
- Sarrià de Ter 4,144 hab. / 4 km^{2}
- Sils 4,347 hab. / 30 km^{2}
- Tossa de Mar 5,662 hab. / 38 km^{2}
- Vall-llobrega 778 hab. / 5 km^{2}
- Vidreres 7,016 hab. / 48 km^{2}
- Vilablareix 2,266 hab. / 6 km^{2}
- Vilobí d'Onyar 2,756 hab. / 32 km^{2}

== See also ==
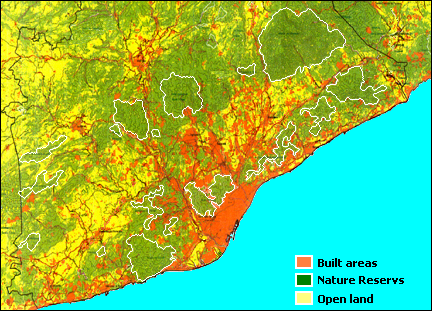

- Àmbit metropolità de Barcelona, one of the seven territories defined by the Regional Plan of Catalonia
- Àrea Metropolitana de Barcelona (AMB) (also English Greater Barcelona), integrated territorial executive bodies
- Urban planning of Barcelona
