= Sant Sebastià dels Gorgs =

Monastery in Avinyonet del Penedès, Spain

Coordinates: 41.380994°N 1.765964°E

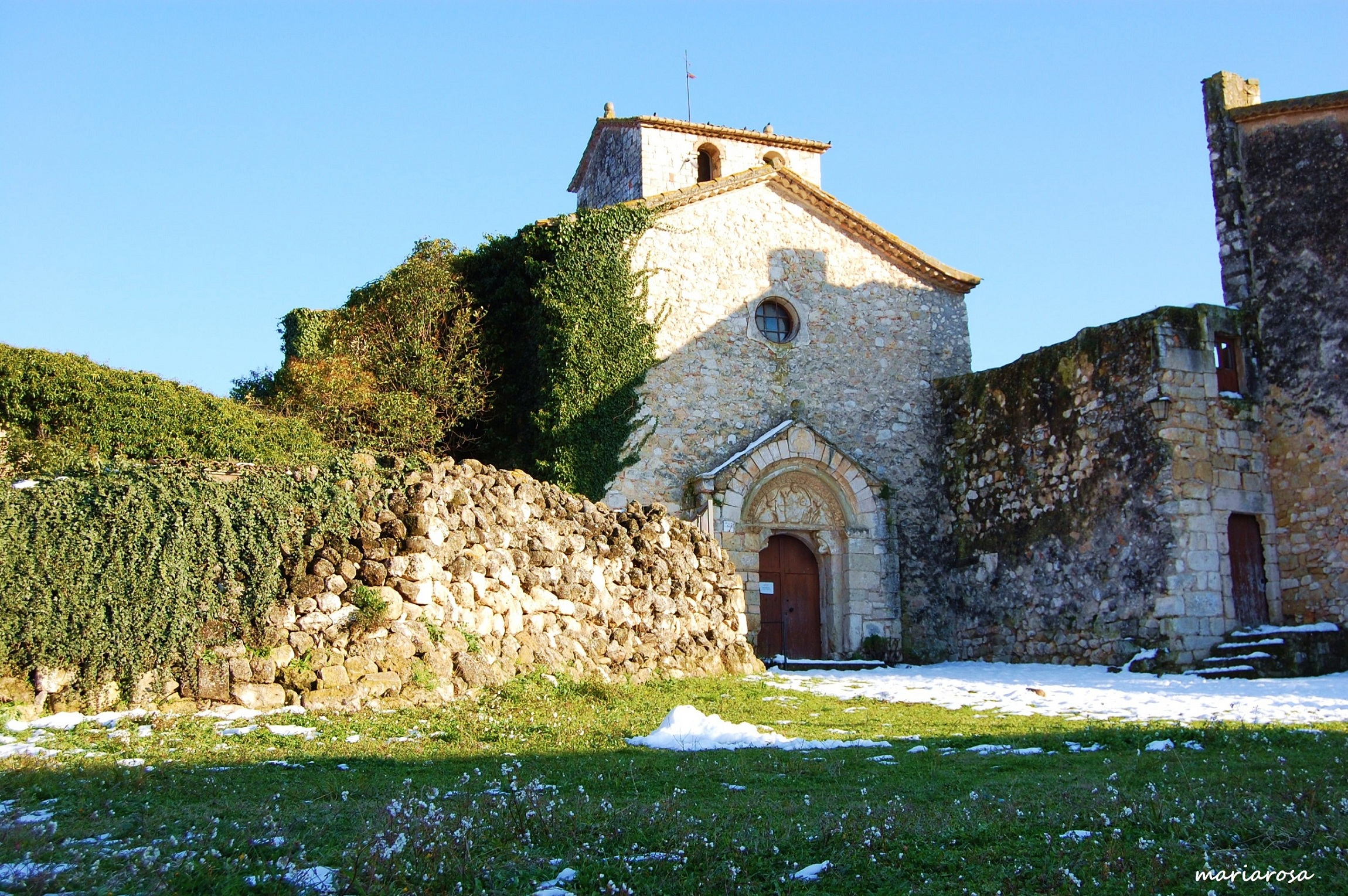
Sant Sebastià dels Gorgs

Sant Sebastià dels Gorgs is a cenobitic Benedictine monastery in the municipality of Avinyonet del Penedès, comarca of Alt Penedès, Catalonia, Spain. In 2000, it was declared a Cultural Asset of National Interest.

== Architecture and fittings ==
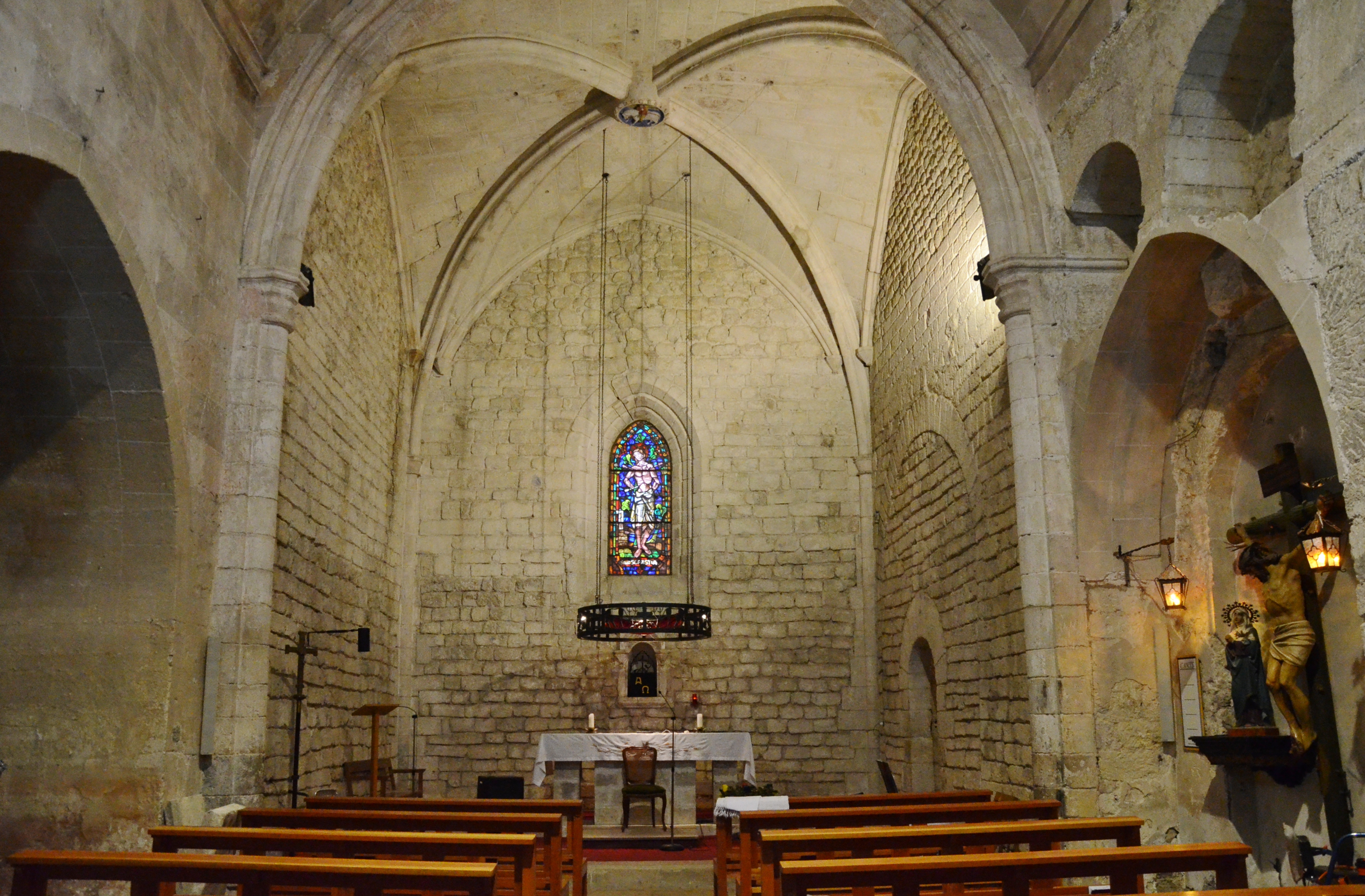
Interior view

It is designed in Romanesque style. The door is 12th century. The tympanum features the figure of Christframed by a mandorla. The building was in ruins in 1388. Part of the temple was rebuilt in Gothic style. The bell tower was rebuilt in Lombard style, with three floors and a gabled roof. Square in plan, it is decorated with Lombardy arches and pilasters. There is a Gothic apse. The ground floor is covered with a barrel vault and the third floor has mullioned windows with columns and carved capitals.

The old cloister with three galleries is preserved and of those three, the eastern is incomplete. It was built between the 11th and 12th century. All the gallery columns have capitals decorated with plant and animal motifs. The capitals are preserved. The second floor sculptures are of low quality. The capitals display human figures devoured by animals.

== Bibliography ==
- Pladevall, Antoni: Els monestirs catalans, Ediciones Destino, Barcelona, 1970 ISBN 84-233-0511-2 (in Catalan)
