= Province of Barcelona =

Province of Spain

Coordinates: 41°27′N 2°5′E

Province of Barcelona Provincia de Barcelona (Spanish) Província de Barcelona (Catalan)
- Province
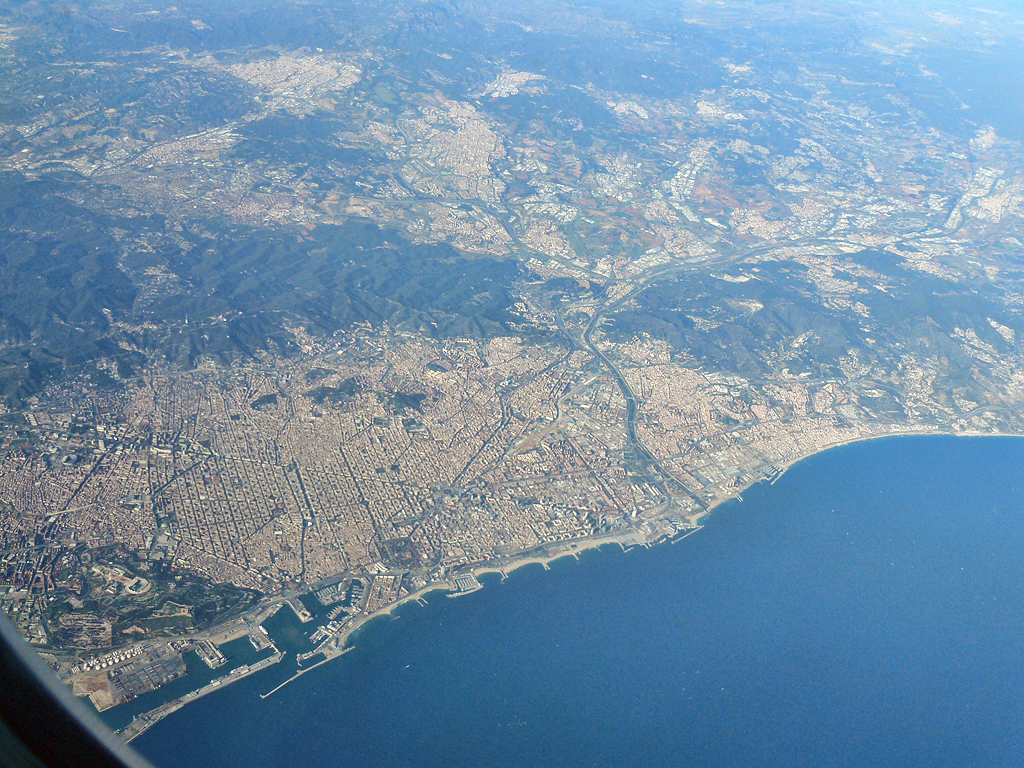
- Aerial view of Barcelona and the surrounding suburbs

- Flag Coat of arms

- Location of the Province of Barcelona in Spain
- Country: Spain
- Autonomous community: Catalonia
- Capital: Barcelona
- Municipalities: 311

Government
  - Body: Provincial Deputation of Barcelona
  - President: Lluïsa Moret (PSC)

Area
  - Total: 7,733.90 km^{2} (2,986.08 sq mi)
  - Rank: 33rd in Spain
- 1.5% of Spain

Population (2025)
  - Total: 5,959,941
  - Rank: 2nd in Spain
  - Density: 770.626/km^{2} (1,995.91/sq mi)
- 12.1% of Spain
- Time zone: UTC+1 (CET)
  - Summer (DST): UTC+2 (CEST)
- ISO 3166 code: ES-B
- Official language(s): Catalan • Spanish
- Parliament: Cortes Generales; Parliament of Catalonia
- Website: diba.cat

Barcelona (Spanish: Provincia de Barcelona [baɾθeˈlona], Catalan: Província de Barcelona [bəɾsəˈlonə]) is a province in the center of the autonomous community of Catalonia in northeastern Spain. The province is bordered by the provinces of Tarragona, Lleida, and Girona, and by the Mediterranean Sea.

The area of the province is 7,733.90 km^{2} (2,986.08 sq mi), and the population is 5,959,941, of which 28.7% is in the city of Barcelona itself, which itself is also part of the Barcelona metropolitan area. It is both the 2nd most populous and 2nd most densely populated province in the country.

== Geography ==
The Catalan Pre-Coastal Range and Catalan Coastal Range mountains run through the Province of Barcelona. There are several notable smaller mountain ranges that are located in the province, including Montseny Massif, Serra de Collserola, and Tibidabo. Pedraforca is the tallest mountain in the province, located on the north side as part of the Pre-Pyrenees. Tibidabo is the mountain that overlooks the city of Barcelona.

The majority of the Province of Barcelona has a Mediterranean climate on the coast and an oceanic climate inland.

== Administration ==
The capital of the province is the city of Barcelona, and the provincial council is based in the Casa Serra on the Rambla de Catalunya in that city. Some other cities and towns in Barcelona province include L'Hospitalet de Llobregat, Badalona, Cerdanyola del Vallès, Martorell, Mataró, Granollers, Sabadell, Terrassa, Sitges, Igualada, Vic, Manresa, and Berga.

Since the division by provinces in Spain and the division by comarques in Catalonia do not completely agree, the term comarques of the province of Barcelona would not be entirely correct. However, a list of the comarques that are included—totally or partially—in the province of Barcelona can be made:

- Fully included:
  - Alt Penedès
  - Anoia
  - Bages
  - Baix Llobregat
  - Barcelonès
  - Garraf
  - Maresme
  - Moianès
  - Vallès Occidental
  - Vallès Oriental
- Partially included:
  - Berguedà (all municipalities except Gósol)
  - Osona (all municipalities except Espinelves, Vidrà and Viladrau)
  - Selva (only the municipality of Fogars de la Selva)

=== Municipalities ===
The province has 311 municipalities:

- Abrera
- Aguilar de Segarra
- Aiguafreda
- Alella
- Alpens
- L'Ametlla del Vallès
- Arenys de Mar
- Arenys de Munt
- Argençola
- Argentona
- Artés
- Avià
- Avinyó
- Avinyonet del Penedès
- Badalona
- Badia del Vallès
- Bagà
- Balenyà
- Balsareny
- Barberà del Vallès
- Barcelona
- Begues
- Bellprat
- Berga
- Bigues i Riells
- Borredà
- El Bruc
- El Brull
- Les Cabanyes
- Cabrera d'Anoia
- Cabrera de Mar
- Cabrils
- Calaf
- Calders
- Caldes d'Estrac
- Caldes de Montbui
- Calella
- Calldetenes
- Callús
- Calonge de Segarra
- Campins
- Canet de Mar
- Canovelles
- Cànoves i Samalús
- Canyelles
- Capellades
- Capolat
- Cardedeu
- Cardona
- Carme
- Casserres
- Castell de l'Areny
- Castellar de n'Hug
- Castellar del Riu
- Castellar del Vallès
- Castellbell i el Vilar
- Castellbisbal
- Castellcir
- Castelldefels
- Castellet i la Gornal
- Castellfollit de Riubregós
- Castellfollit del Boix
- Castellgalí
- Castellnou de Bages
- Castellolí
- Castellterçol
- Castellví de la Marca
- Castellví de Rosanes
- Centelles
- Cercs
- Cerdanyola del Vallès
- Cervelló
- Collbató
- Collsuspina
- Copons
- Corbera de Llobregat
- Cornellà de Llobregat
- Cubelles
- Dosrius
- Esparreguera
- Esplugues de Llobregat
- L'Espunyola
- L'Esquirol
- L'Estany
- Figaró-Montmany
- Fígols
- Fogars de la Selva
- Fogars de Montclús
- Folgueroles
- Fonollosa
- Font-rubí
- Les Franqueses del Vallès
- Gaià
- Gallifa
- La Garriga
- Gavà
- Gelida
- Gironella
- Gisclareny
- La Granada
- Granera
- Granollers
- Gualba
- Guardiola de Berguedà
- Gurb
- L'Hospitalet de Llobregat
- Els Hostalets de Pierola
- Igualada
- Jorba
- La Llacuna
- La Llagosta
- Lliçà d'Amunt
- Lliçà de Vall
- Llinars del Vallès
- Lluçà
- Malgrat de Mar
- Malla
- Manlleu
- Manresa
- Marganell
- Martorell
- Martorelles
- Les Masies de Roda
- Les Masies de Voltregà
- El Masnou
- Masquefa
- Matadepera
- Mataró
- Mediona
- Moià
- Molins de Rei
- Mollet del Vallès
- Monistrol de Calders
- Monistrol de Montserrat
- Montcada i Reixac
- Montclar
- Montesquiu
- Montgat
- Montmajor
- Montmaneu
- Montmeló
- Montornès del Vallès
- Montseny
- Muntanyola
- Mura
- Navarcles
- Navàs
- La Nou de Berguedà
- Òdena
- Olèrdola
- Olesa de Bonesvalls
- Olesa de Montserrat
- Olivella
- Olost
- Olvan
- Orís
- Oristà
- Orpí
- Òrrius
- Pacs del Penedès
- Palafolls
- Palau-solità i Plegamans
- Pallejà
- La Palma de Cervelló
- El Papiol
- Parets del Vallès
- Perafita
- Piera
- Pineda de Mar
- El Pla del Penedès
- La Pobla de Claramunt
- La Pobla de Lillet
- Polinyà
- El Pont de Vilomara i Rocafort
- Pontons
- El Prat de Llobregat
- Prats de Lluçanès
- Els Prats de Rei
- Premià de Dalt
- Premià de Mar
- Puig-reig
- Puigdàlber
- Pujalt
- La Quar
- Rajadell
- Rellinars
- Ripollet
- La Roca del Vallès
- Roda de Ter
- Rubí
- Rubió
- Rupit i Pruit
- Sabadell
- Sagàs
- Saldes
- Sallent
- Sant Adrià de Besòs
- Sant Agustí de Lluçanès
- Sant Andreu de la Barca
- Sant Andreu de Llavaneres
- Sant Antoni de Vilamajor
- Sant Bartomeu del Grau
- Sant Boi de Llobregat
- Sant Boi de Lluçanès
- Sant Cebrià de Vallalta
- Sant Celoni
- Sant Climent de Llobregat
- Sant Cugat del Vallès
- Sant Cugat Sesgarrigues
- Sant Esteve de Palautordera
- Sant Esteve Sesrovires
- Sant Feliu de Codines
- Sant Feliu de Llobregat
- Sant Feliu Sasserra
- Sant Fost de Campsentelles
- Sant Fruitós de Bages
- Sant Hipòlit de Voltregà
- Sant Iscle de Vallalta
- Sant Jaume de Frontanyà
- Sant Joan de Vilatorrada
- Sant Joan Despí
- Sant Julià de Cerdanyola
- Sant Julià de Vilatorta
- Sant Just Desvern
- Sant Llorenç d'Hortons
- Sant Llorenç Savall
- Sant Martí d'Albars
- Sant Martí de Centelles
- Sant Martí de Tous
- Sant Martí Sarroca
- Sant Martí Sesgueioles
- Sant Mateu de Bages
- Sant Pere de Ribes
- Sant Pere de Riudebitlles
- Sant Pere de Torelló
- Sant Pere de Vilamajor
- Sant Pere Sallavinera
- Sant Pol de Mar
- Sant Quintí de Mediona
- Sant Quirze de Besora
- Sant Quirze del Vallès
- Sant Quirze Safaja
- Sant Sadurní d'Anoia
- Sant Sadurní d'Osormort
- Sant Salvador de Guardiola
- Sant Vicenç de Castellet
- Sant Vicenç de Montalt
- Sant Vicenç de Torelló
- Sant Vicenç dels Horts
- Santa Cecília de Voltregà
- Santa Coloma de Cervelló
- Santa Coloma de Gramenet
- Santa Eugènia de Berga
- Santa Eulàlia de Riuprimer
- Santa Eulàlia de Ronçana
- Santa Fe del Penedès
- Santa Margarida de Montbui
- Santa Margarida i els Monjos
- Santa Maria d'Oló
- Santa Maria de Besora
- Santa Maria de Martorelles
- Santa Maria de Merlès
- Santa Maria de Miralles
- Santa Maria de Palautordera
- Santa Perpètua de Mogoda
- Santa Susanna
- Santpedor
- Sentmenat
- Seva
- Sitges
- Sobremunt
- Sora
- Subirats
- Súria
- Tagamanent
- Talamanca
- Taradell
- Tavèrnoles
- Tavertet
- Teià
- Terrassa
- Tiana
- Tona
- Tordera
- Torelló
- La Torre de Claramunt
- Torrelavit
- Torrelles de Foix
- Torrelles de Llobregat
- Ullastrell
- Vacarisses
- Vallbona d'Anoia
- Vallcebre
- Vallgorguina
- Vallirana
- Vallromanes
- Veciana
- Vic
- Vilada
- Viladecans
- Viladecavalls
- Vilafranca del Penedès
- Vilalba Sasserra
- Vilanova de Sau
- Vilanova del Camí
- Vilanova del Vallès
- Vilanova i la Geltrú
- Vilassar de Dalt
- Vilassar de Mar
- Vilobí del Penedès
- Viver i Serrateix

== Demographics ==
Province of Barcelona population pyramid in 2022

As of 2025, the population is 5,959,941, of which 48.9% are male, and 51.1% are female. Minors make up 16.4% of the population, and seniors make up 19.7%.

Historical population

Year	Pop.	±%
1842	455,874	—
1857	713,734	+56.6%
1877	827,629	+16.0%
1887	879,771	+6.3%
1900	1,052,977	+19.7%
1910	1,136,068	+7.9%
1920	1,340,906	+18.0%
1930	1,728,683	+28.9%
1940	1,935,707	+12.0%

Year	Pop.	±%
1950	2,215,901	+14.5%
1960	2,838,801	+28.1%
1970	3,915,010	+37.9%
1981	4,623,204	+18.1%
1991	4,654,407	+0.7%
2001	4,805,927	+3.3%
2011	5,522,565	+14.9%
2021	5,702,262	+3.3%

Source: INE

=== Immigration ===
As of 2025, immigrants make up 25.0% of the population. The 5 largest foreign countries of birth are Morocco, Colombia, Argentina, Peru, and Ecuador.
