= Avinyonet =

Avinyonet may refer to:

- Avinyonet de Puigventós, municipality in the comarca of Alt Empordà
- Avinyonet del Penedès, municipality in the comarca of Alt Penedès
