= Torrelles =

Torrelles may refer to:

- Torrelles de Foix, municipality in the comarca of Alt Penedès
- Torrelles de Llobregat, municipality in the comarca of the Baix Llobregat
