= Vilobí =

Vilobí may refer to:

- Vilobí del Penedès, municipality in the comarca of Alt Penedès
- Vilobí d'Onyar, municipality in the comarca of Selva
