= Orbital Railway Line =

Project for a new Rodalies de Catalunya commuter rail line (Renfe Operadora)

Barcelona orbital line

Overview
- Other name(s): Fourth railway bypass
- Native name: línia orbital
- Status: In development
- Owner: Authority: ATM Barcelona
- Locale: Municipality:26; Alt Penedès, Baix Llobregat, Garraf, Maresme, Vallès Occidental and Oriental
- Termini: Vilanova i la Geltrú; Mataró
- Stations: 39 (23 new stations)

Service
- Type: commuter rail

History
- First service: 2016

Technical
- Line length: 120 kilometres (75 mi) (68 kilometres (42 mi) new)
- Track gauge: 1,668 mm (5 ft 5 21/32 in)
- Operating speed: 60 km/h (37 mph)

The Barcelona orbital line (Catalan: línia orbital) is a railway project forming part of both the Pla d'infraestructures de Catalunya (PITC), (Note: Catalonia infrastructure plan) a long-term development plan due for completion in 2026, and the Pla de transport de viatgers de Catalunya (PTVC), (Note: Catalonia passenger transport plan) a short-term plan due for completion in 2012. In following perimeter routes the orbital line and another railway project, the Eix Transversal Ferroviari de Catalunya, (Note: Catalan transversal railway line) are the first railway schemes to depart from the radial system developed so far in the Barcelona area.

Also known as the Quart cinturó ferroviari, (Note: Fourth railway bypass) the orbital line will connect Rodalies Barcelona services between Vilanova i la Geltrú and Mataró via a 119 kilometres (74 mi) line passing through Granollers, Sabadell, Terrassa, Martorell and Vilafranca del Penedès, but avoiding the actual city of Barcelona. Some sections will make use of existing track belonging to Administrador de Infraestructuras Ferroviarias (Adif) and operated by Renfe Operadora, whilst 68 km of track - of which 46 kilometres (29 mi) in tunnels - and 23 new stations will be constructed.

Orbital line within Catalonia.
