= Sant Llorenç d'Hortons =

- Municipality
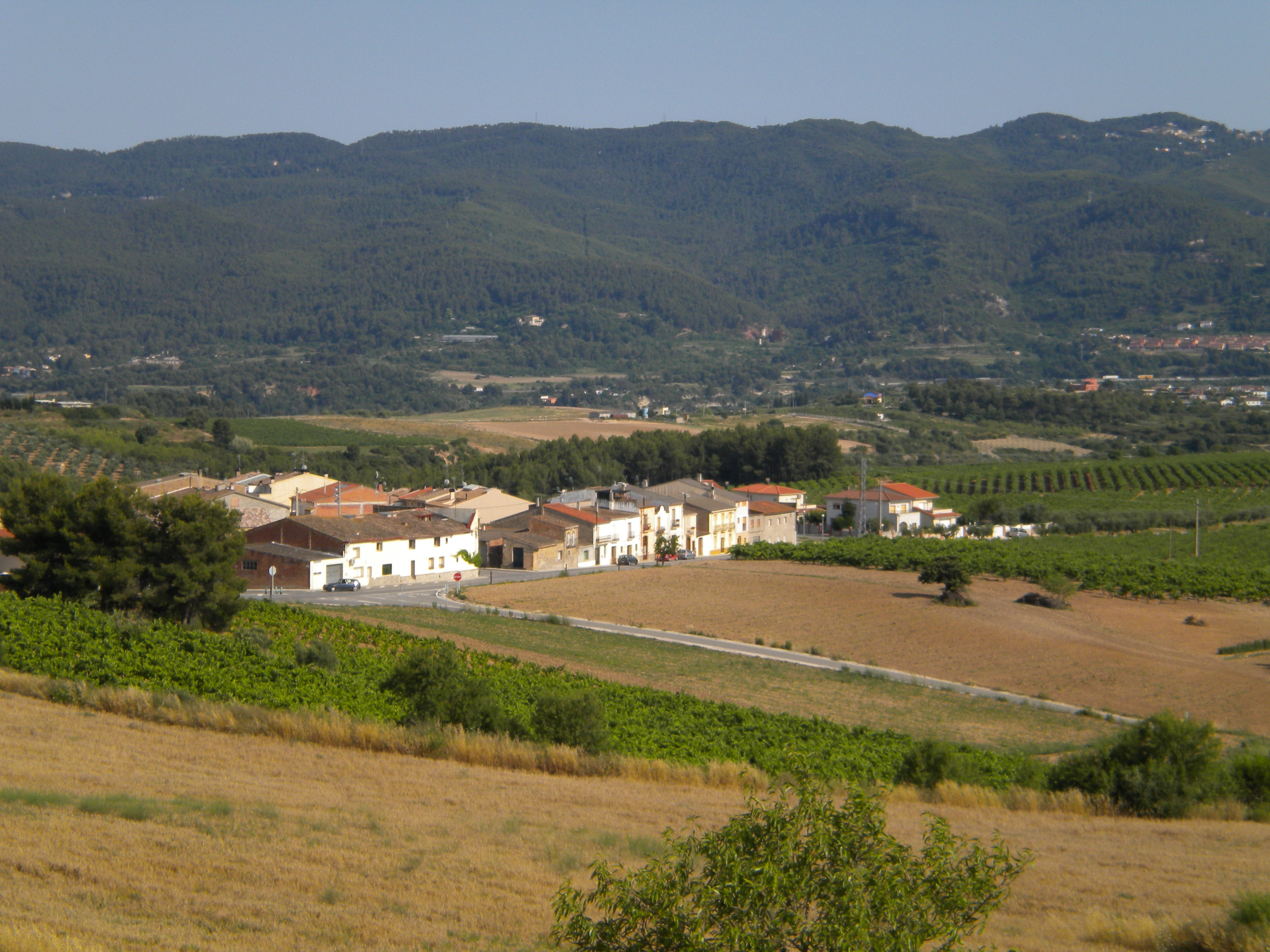
- Sant Joan Samora village

- Coat of arms

- Location in Catalonia Sant Llorenç d'Hortons (Spain)
- Coordinates: 41°28′11″N 1°49′32″E
- Country: Spain
- Community: Catalonia
- Province: Barcelona
- Comarca: Alt Penedès

Government
  - Mayor: Jordi Ferrer Durich (2015)

Area
  - Total: 19.7 km^{2} (7.6 sq mi)

Population (2025-01-01)
  - Total: 2,627
  - Density: 133/km^{2} (345/sq mi)
- Website: www.ajhortons.cat

Sant Llorenç d'Hortons (Catalan pronunciation: [ˈsaɲ ʎuˈɾɛnz ðuɾˈtons]) is a municipality in the comarca of Alt Penedès, Barcelona, Catalonia, Spain.
