= Mediona =

- Municipality
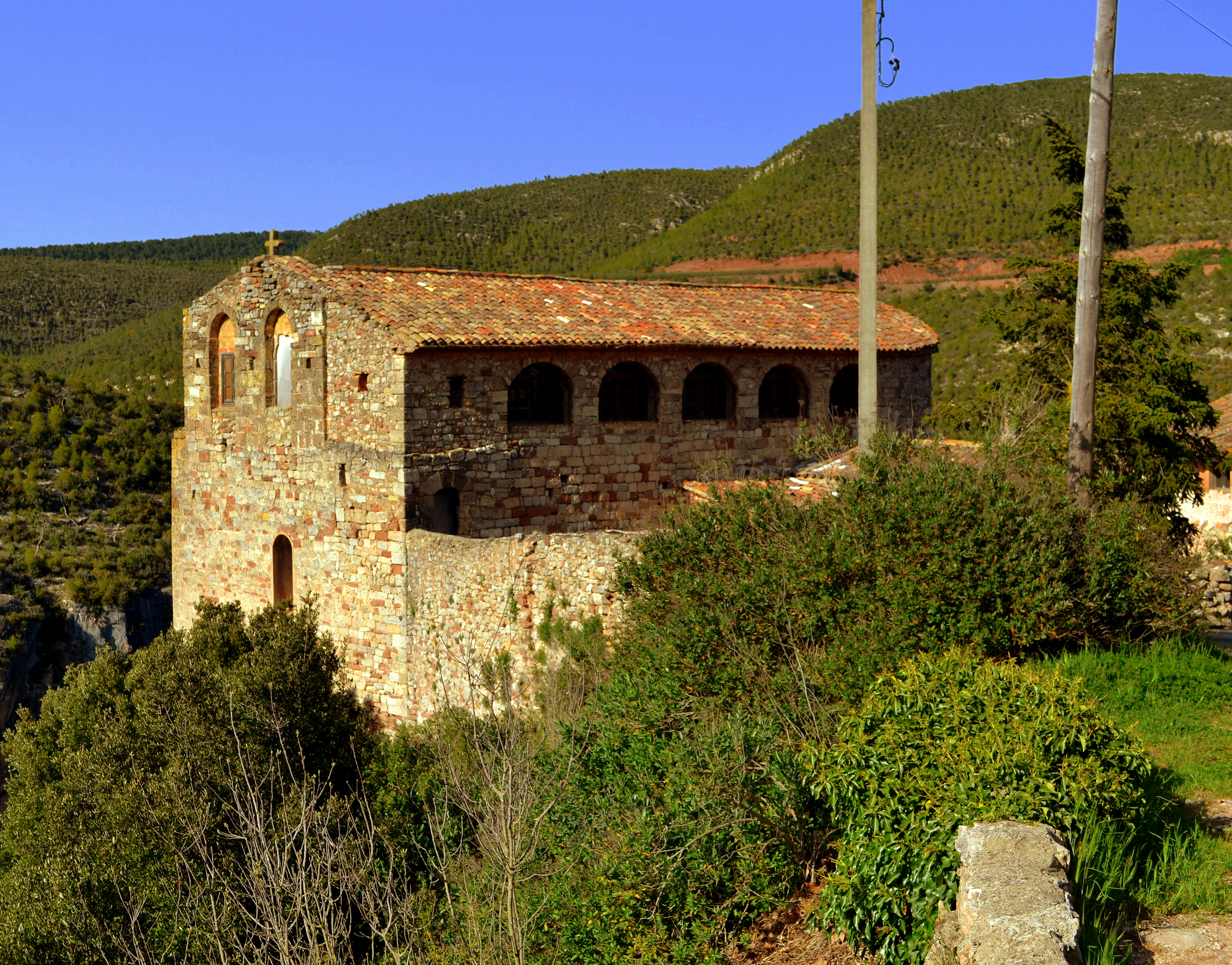
- Mediona castle and church

- Flag Coat of arms

- Location in Catalonia Mediona (Spain)
- Coordinates: 41°28′47″N 1°36′45″E
- Country: Spain
- Community: Catalonia
- Province: Barcelona
- Comarca: Alt Penedès

Government
  - Mayor: Servand Casas Mateo (2015)

Area
  - Total: 47.6 km^{2} (18.4 sq mi)

Population (2025-01-01)
  - Total: 2,658
  - Density: 55.8/km^{2} (145/sq mi)
- Website: www.mediona.cat

Mediona (Catalan pronunciation: [məðiˈonə]) is a municipality in the comarca of Alt Penedès, Barcelona, Catalonia, Spain.
