= Pontons, Spain =

Pontons
- Municipality
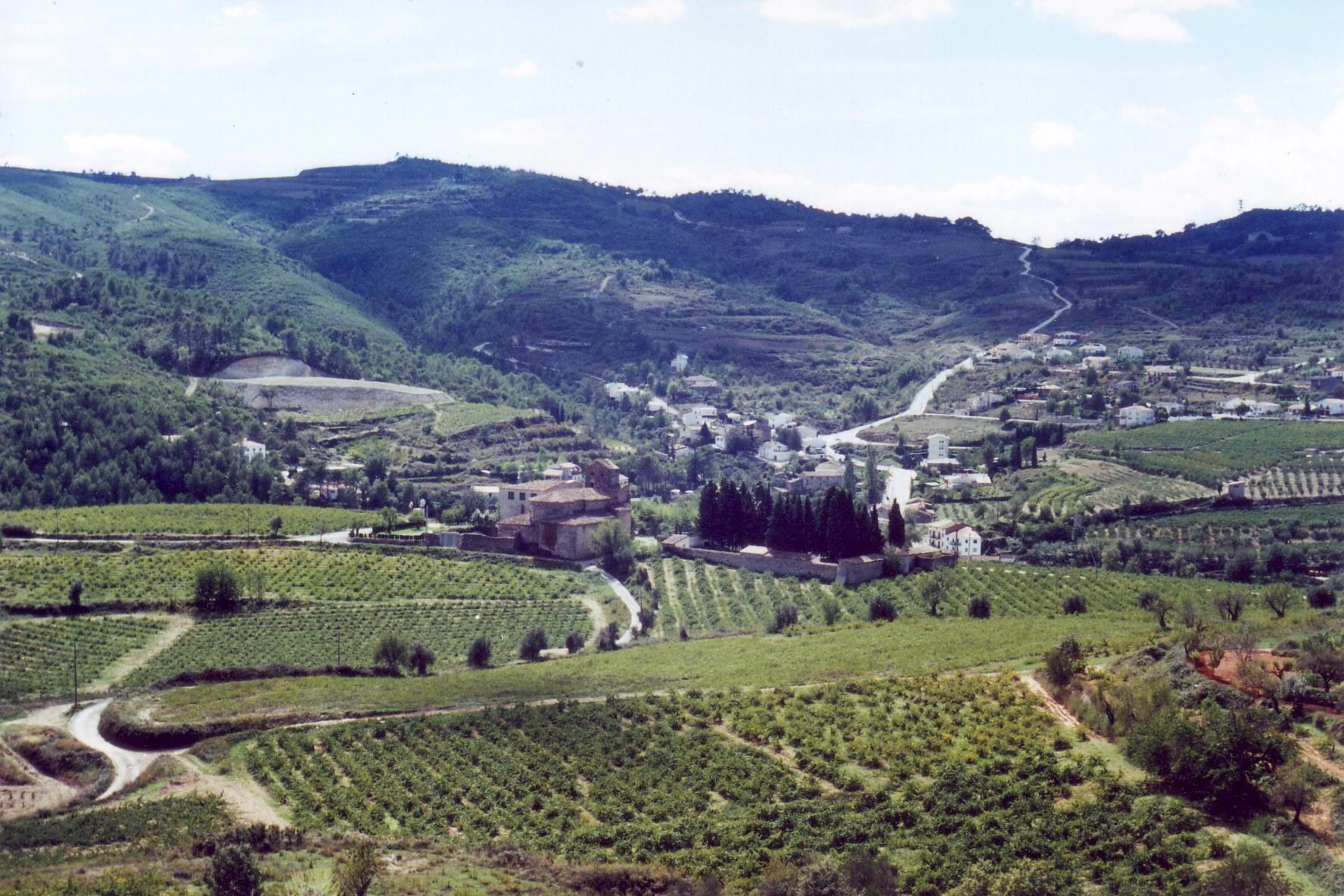
- Pontons

- Flag Coat of arms

- Location in Catalonia
- Coordinates: 41°25′3″N 1°31′4″E
- Country: Spain
- Community: Catalonia
- Province: Barcelona
- Comarca: Alt Penedès

Government
  - Mayor: Luis F. Caldentey Querol (2015)

Area
  - Total: 25.9 km^{2} (10.0 sq mi)

Population (2025-01-01)
  - Total: 516
  - Density: 19.9/km^{2} (51.6/sq mi)
- Website: pontons.org

Pontons (Catalan pronunciation: [punˈtons]) is a municipality in the comarca of Alt Penedès in Catalonia, Spain.
