= Talamanca (Bages) =

- Municipality
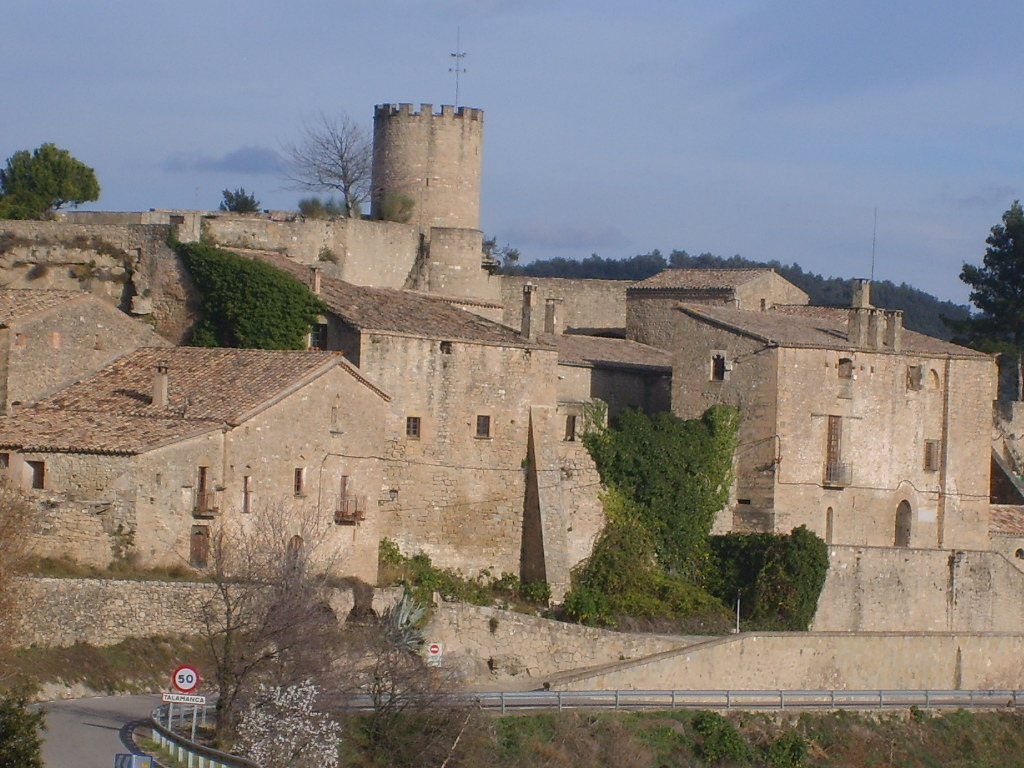

- Flag Coat of arms

- Location in Catalonia Talamanca (Catalonia) Talamanca (Spain)
- Coordinates: 41°44′N 1°59′E
- Country: Spain
- Community: Catalonia
- Province: Barcelona
- Comarca: Bages

Government
  - Mayor: Josep Tarín Canales (2015)

Area
  - Total: 29.4 km^{2} (11.4 sq mi)

Population (2025-01-01)
  - Total: 209
  - Density: 7.11/km^{2} (18.4/sq mi)
- Website: www.talamanca.cat

Talamanca (Catalan pronunciation: [tələˈmaŋkə]) is a village in the province of Barcelona and autonomous community of Catalonia, Spain. The municipality covers an area of 29.49 square kilometres (11.39 sq mi) and the population in 2014 was 141.
