= El Pla del Penedès =

- Municipality
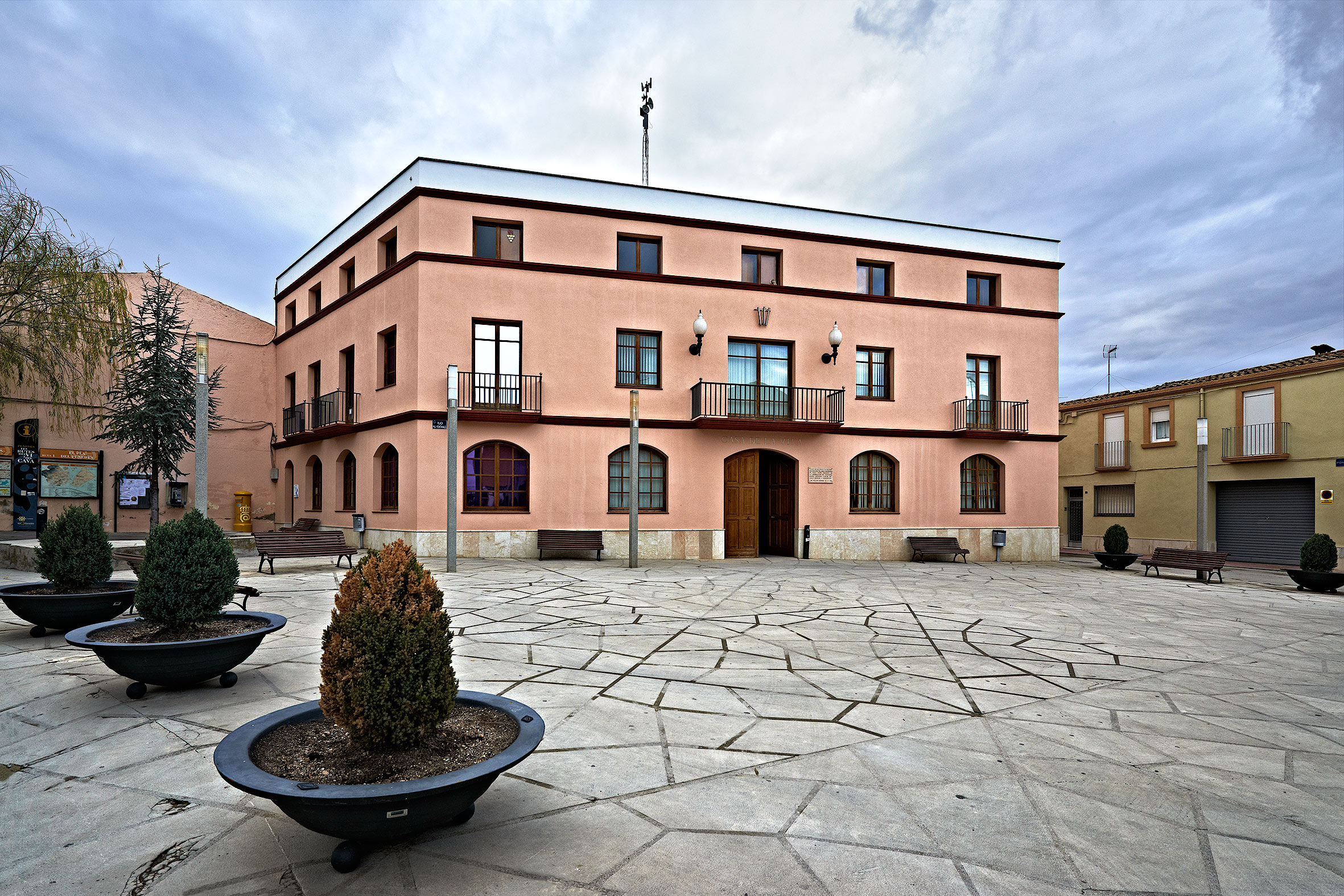
- Town hall square

- Flag Coat of arms

- Location in Province of Barcelona Location in Catalonia Location Spain
- Coordinates: 41.4197°N 1.7133°E
- Country: Spain
- Community: Catalonia
- Province: Barcelona
- Comarca: Alt Penedès

Government
  - Mayor: Santi Soler Vives (2015)

Area
  - Total: 9.6 km^{2} (3.7 sq mi)

Population (2025-01-01)
  - Total: 1,393
  - Density: 150/km^{2} (380/sq mi)
- Website: www.elpladelpenedes.cat

El Pla del Penedès (Catalan pronunciation: [əl ˈpla ðəl pənəˈðɛs]) is a municipality in the comarca of Alt Penedès, Province of Barcelona, Catalonia, Spain.
