= Santa Fe del Penedès =

- Municipality
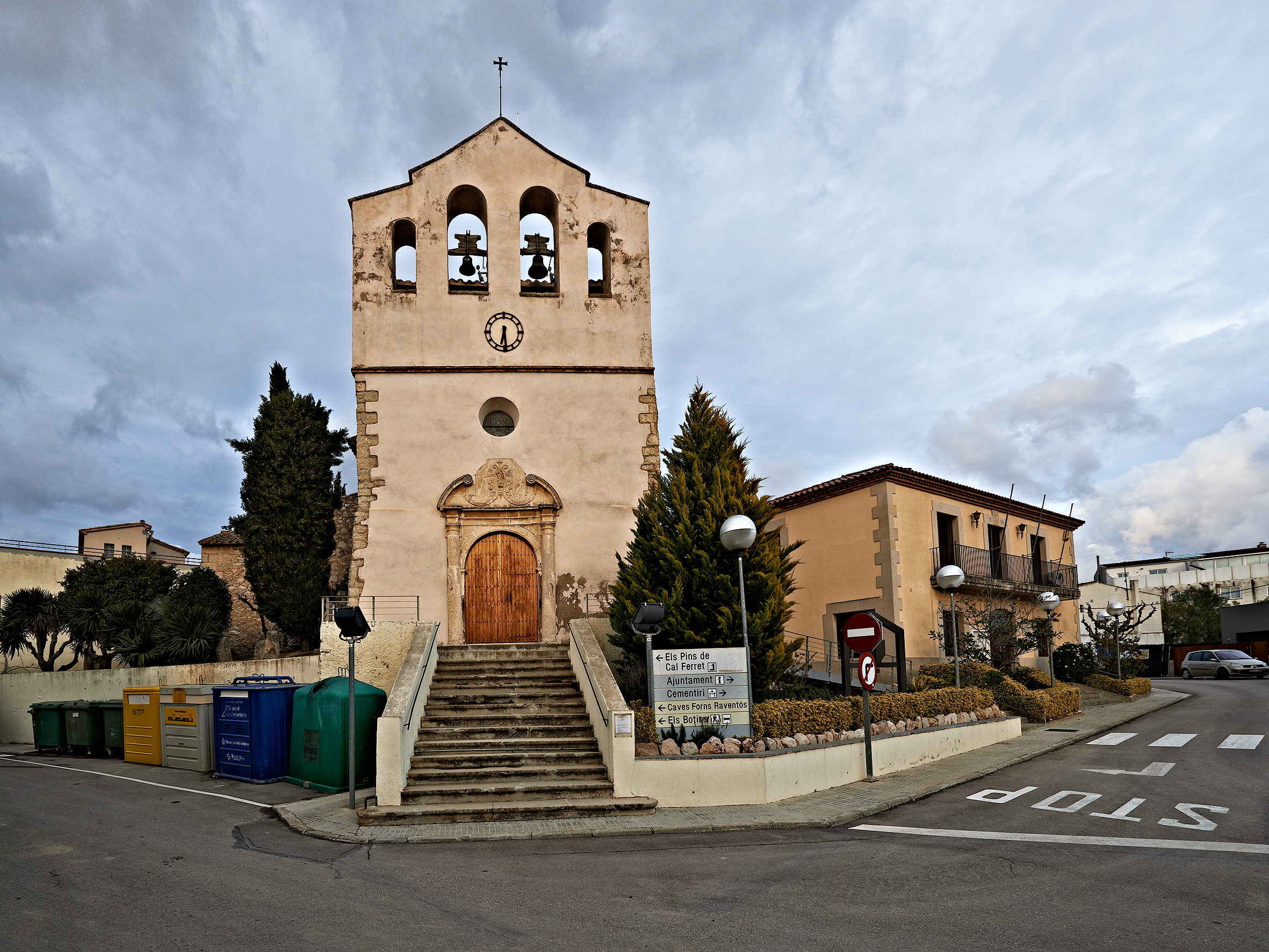
- Parish church of Santa Fe del Penedès

- Flag Coat of arms

- Location in Catalonia Santa Fe del Penedès (Spain)
- Coordinates: 41.387°N 1.722°E
- Country: Spain
- Community: Catalonia
- Province: Barcelona
- Comarca: Alt Penedès

Government
  - Mayor: Jordi Bosch Morgades (2019)

Area
  - Total: 3.4 km^{2} (1.3 sq mi)

Population (2025-01-01)
  - Total: 365
  - Density: 110/km^{2} (280/sq mi)
- Website: www.santafepenedes.cat

Santa Fe del Penedès (Catalan pronunciation: [ˈsantə ˈfɛ ðəl pənəˈðɛs]) is a municipality in the comarca of Alt Penedès, Barcelona, Catalonia, Spain.
