= Pacs del Penedès =

- Municipality
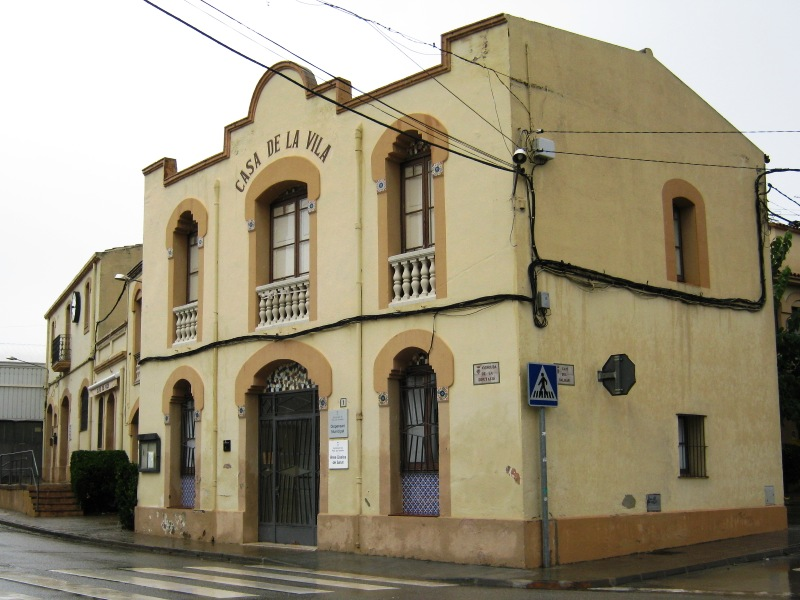
- Pacs town hall

- Coat of arms

- Location in Catalonia Pacs del Penedès (Catalonia) Pacs del Penedès (Spain)
- Coordinates: 41.362°N 1.670°E
- Country: Spain
- Community: Catalonia
- Province: Barcelona
- Comarca: Alt Penedès

Government
  - Mayor: Montserrat Amat Domènech (2023)

Area
  - Total: 6.3 km^{2} (2.4 sq mi)

Population (2025-01-01)
  - Total: 932
  - Density: 150/km^{2} (380/sq mi)
- Website: pacsdelpenedes.cat

Pacs del Penedès (Catalan pronunciation: [ˈpagz ðəl pənəˈðɛs]), sometimes simply Pacs (Catalan: [ˈpaks]) is a municipality in the comarca of Alt Penedès, Barcelona, Catalonia, Spain.
