= Sant Cugat Sesgarrigues =

- Municipality
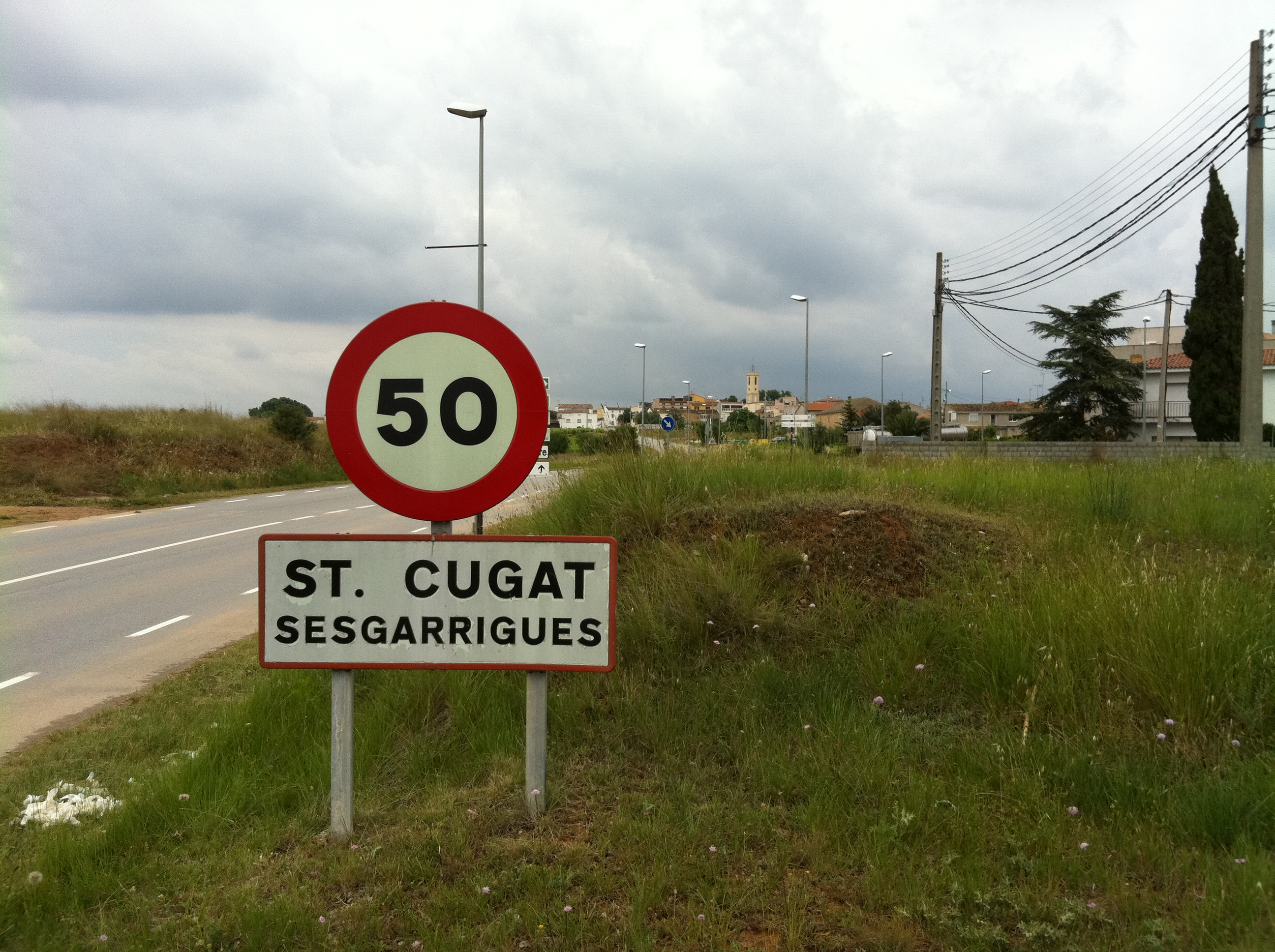
- Town entry

- Coat of arms

- Location in Catalonia Sant Cugat Sesgarrigues (Spain)
- Coordinates: 41°21′58″N 1°45′15″E
- Country: Spain
- Autonomous community: Catalonia
- Province: Barcelona
- Comarca: Alt Penedès

Government
  - Mayor: Montse Albet Noya (2015)

Area
  - Total: 6.2 km^{2} (2.4 sq mi)
- Elevation: 266 m (873 ft)

Population (2025-01-01)
  - Total: 1,038
  - Density: 170/km^{2} (430/sq mi)
- Time zone: UTC+1 (CET)
  - Summer (DST): UTC+2 (CEST)
- Website: santcugatsesgarrigues.cat

Sant Cugat Sesgarrigues (Catalan pronunciation: [ˈsaŋ kuˈɣat səzɣəˈriɣəs]) is a municipality in the comarca of Alt Penedès, in the province of Barcelona, Catalonia, Spain.

== Entities ==
The AEK Sant Cugat is the indoor soccer club founded in 1989.
