= Subirats =

- Municipality
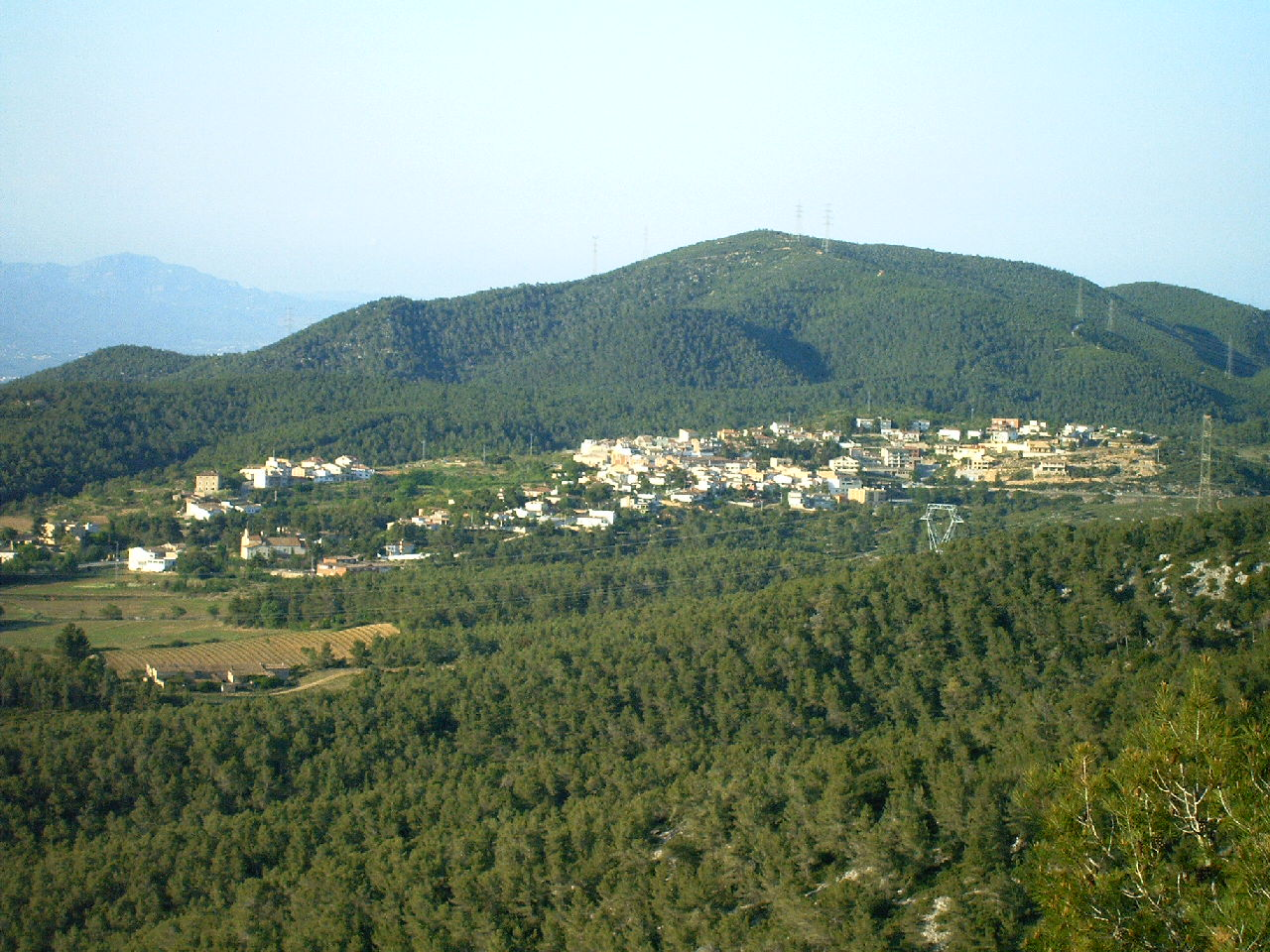
- Ordal

- Flag Coat of arms

- Location in Catalonia Subirats (Spain)
- Coordinates: 41°23′46″N 1°47′38″E
- Country: Spain
- Community: Catalonia
- Province: Barcelona
- Comarca: Alt Penedès

Government
  - Mayor: Pere Pons Vendrell (2015)

Area
  - Total: 55.9 km^{2} (21.6 sq mi)

Population (2025-01-01)
  - Total: 3,288
  - Density: 58.8/km^{2} (152/sq mi)
- Website: www.subirats.cat

Subirats (Catalan pronunciation: [suβiˈɾats]) is a municipality in the comarca of Alt Penedès, Catalonia, Spain. It is a lightly populated wine-producing area.

It includes the villages of:

Village	Population (2013)
Ca l'Avi	101
Can Bas	58
Can Batista	73
Can Cartró	183
Cantallops	75
Caseria Can Rossell	70
Casots, Els	88
Lavern	431
Ordal	631
Pago, El	72
Sant Joan	82
Sant Pau d'Ordal	547
Urbanització Can Rossell	129
Urbanització Casablanca	404
Urbanització la Muntanya Rodona	83
