= Les Cabanyes =

- Municipality
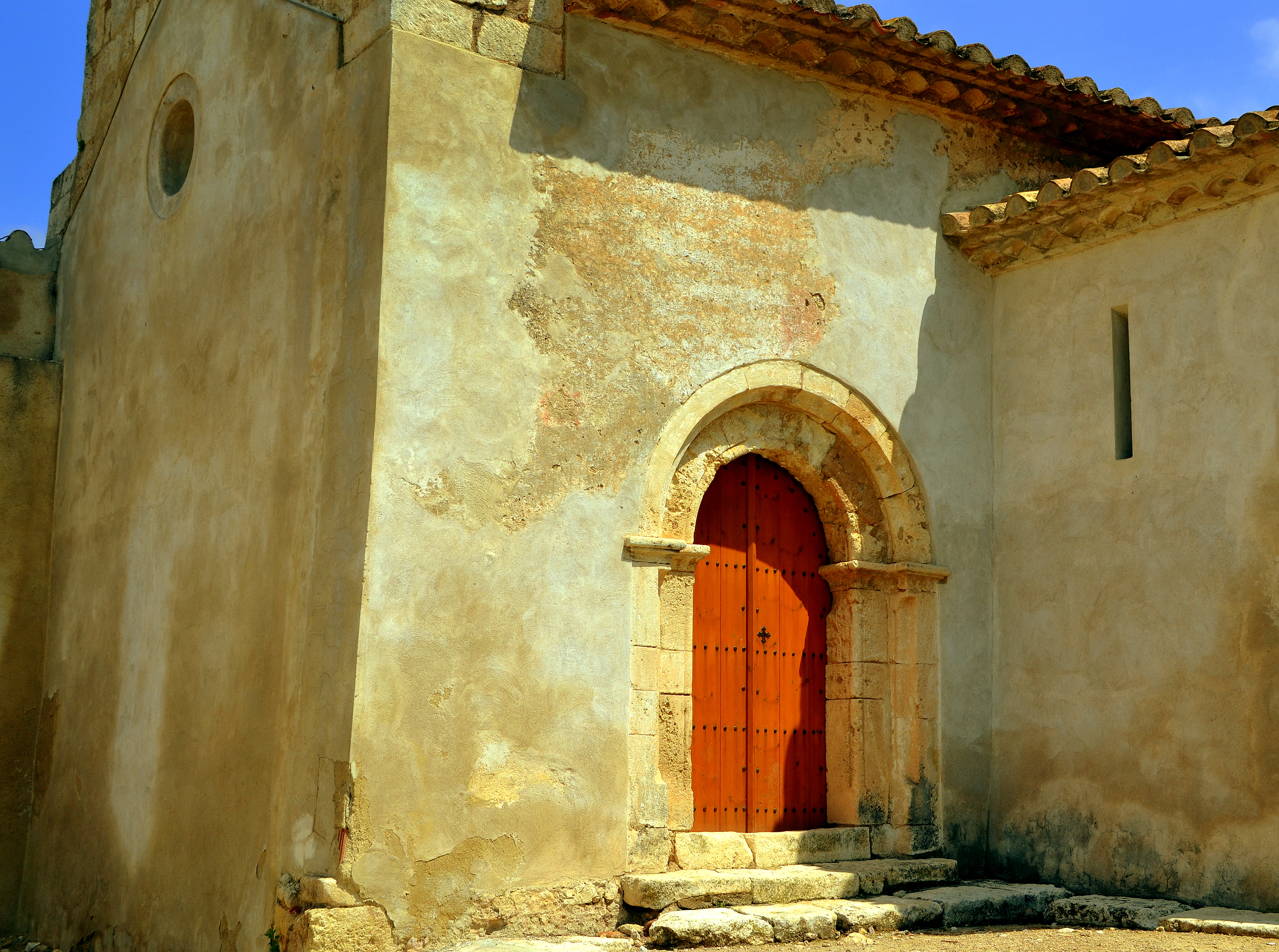
- St. Valentine's church, Les Cabanyes

- Flag Coat of arms

- Location in Catalonia Les Cabanyes (Spain)
- Coordinates: 41°22′34″N 1°41′25″E
- Country: Spain
- Community: Catalonia
- Province: Barcelona
- Comarca: Alt Penedès

Government
  - Mayor: Francesc Olivella Pastallé (2015)

Area
  - Total: 1.2 km^{2} (0.46 sq mi)

Population (2025-01-01)
  - Total: 1,060
  - Density: 880/km^{2} (2,300/sq mi)
- Website: lescabanyes.cat

Les Cabanyes (Catalan pronunciation: [ləs kəˈβaɲəs]) is a municipality in the comarca of Alt Penedès, Barcelona, Catalonia, Spain.
