= La Granada =

- Municipality
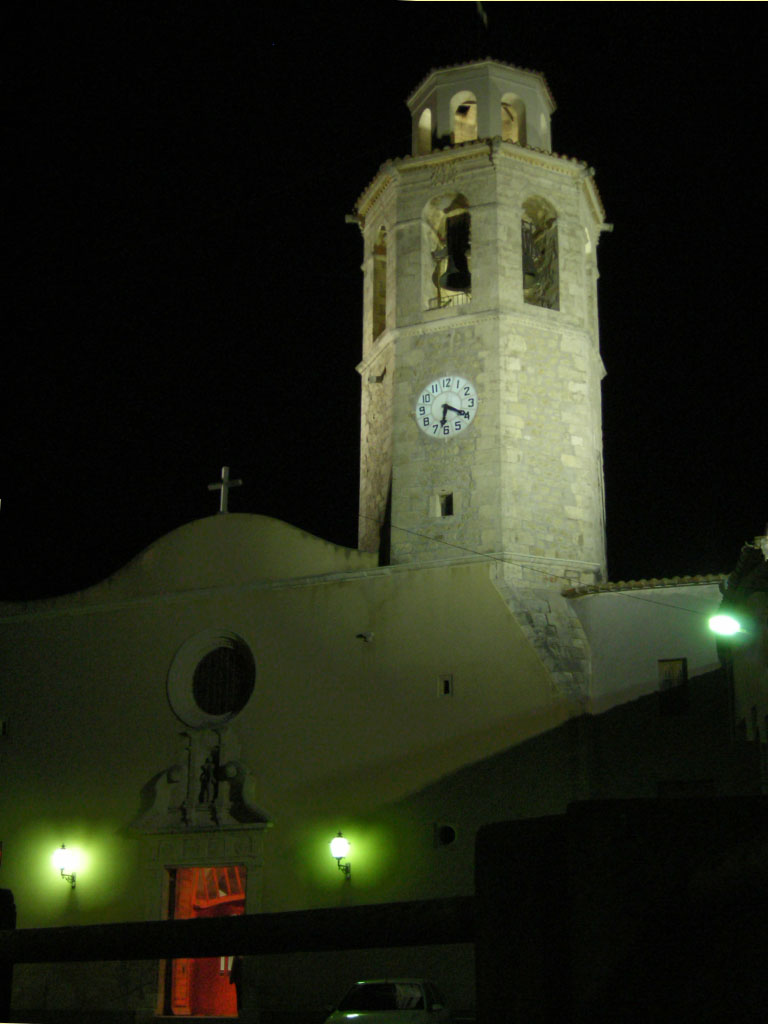
- La Granada church

- Flag Coat of arms

- Location in Catalonia La Granada (Spain)
- Coordinates: 41°22′25″N 1°43′13″E
- Country: Spain
- Community: Catalonia
- Province: Barcelona
- Comarca: Alt Penedès

Government
  - Mayor: Diego Díez De los Ríos Sánchez (2015)

Area
  - Total: 6.5 km^{2} (2.5 sq mi)

Population (2025-01-01)
  - Total: 2,287
  - Density: 350/km^{2} (910/sq mi)
- Website: lagranada.com

La Granada (Catalan pronunciation: [lə ɣɾəˈnaðə]) is a municipality in the comarca of Alt Penedès, Barcelona, Catalonia, Spain. It has an exclave to the east.
