= Castellví de la Marca =

- Municipality
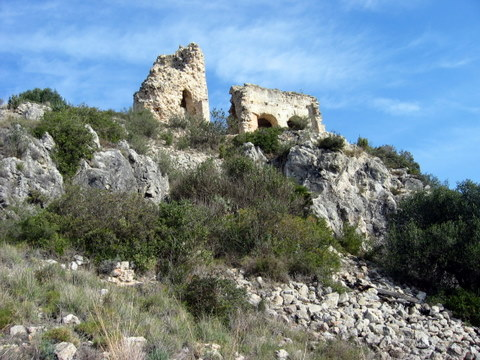
- Castellvell de la Marca

- Flag Coat of arms

- Location in Catalonia Castellví de la Marca (Spain)
- Coordinates: 41°19′41″N 1°37′11″E
- Country: Spain
- Community: Catalonia
- Province: Barcelona
- Comarca: Alt Penedès

Government
  - Mayor: Xavier Ramos Pujol (2015)

Area
  - Total: 28.4 km^{2} (11.0 sq mi)

Population (2025-01-01)
  - Total: 1,721
  - Density: 60.6/km^{2} (157/sq mi)
- Website: castellvidelamarca.cat

Castellví de la Marca (Old Catalan for 'Old Castle of the March'; Catalan pronunciation: [kəsˌteʎˈβi ðə lə ˈmaɾkə]) is a municipality in the comarca of Alt Penedès, Barcelona, Catalonia, Spain.
