= Torrelles de Foix =

- Municipality
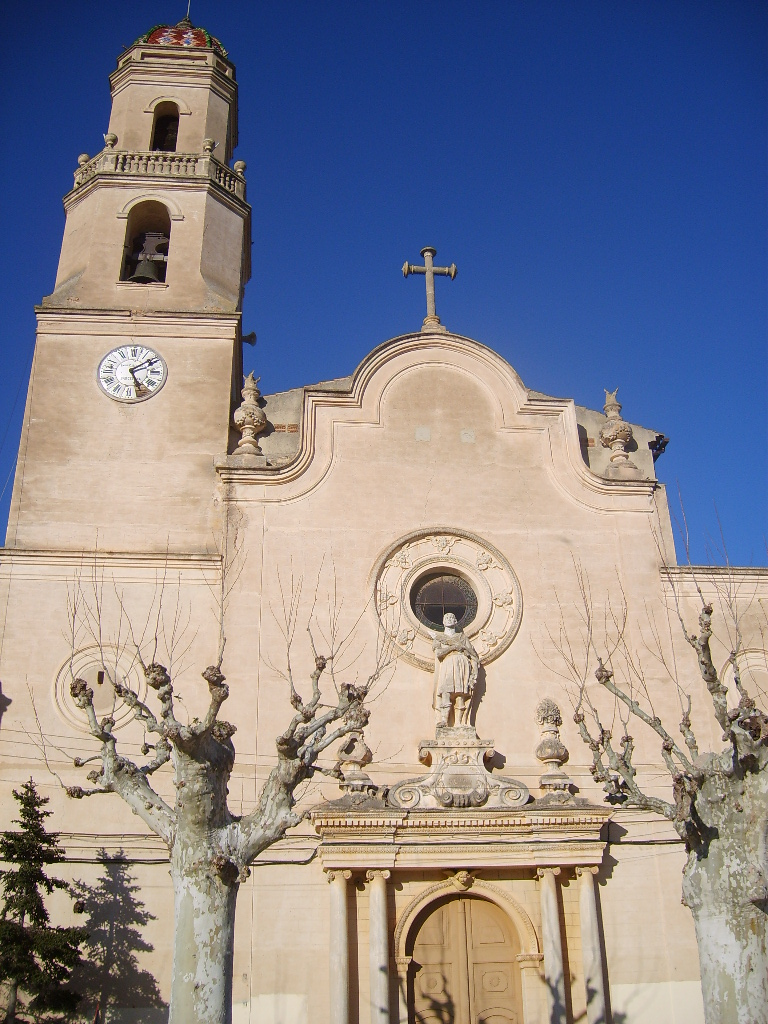
- St. Genís church

- Flag Coat of arms

- Location in Catalonia Torrelles de Foix (Spain)
- Coordinates: 41°23′24″N 1°34′14″E
- Country: Spain
- Community: Catalonia
- Province: Barcelona
- Comarca: Alt Penedès

Government
  - Mayor: Jaime Brichs Morgades (2015)

Area
  - Total: 36.7 km^{2} (14.2 sq mi)

Population (2025-01-01)
  - Total: 2,746
  - Density: 74.8/km^{2} (194/sq mi)
- Website: www.torrellesdefoix.cat

Torrelles de Foix (Catalan pronunciation: [tuˈreʎəz ðə ˈfoʃ]) is a municipality in the comarca of Alt Penedès, Barcelona, Catalonia, Spain.
