= Torrelavit =

- Municipality
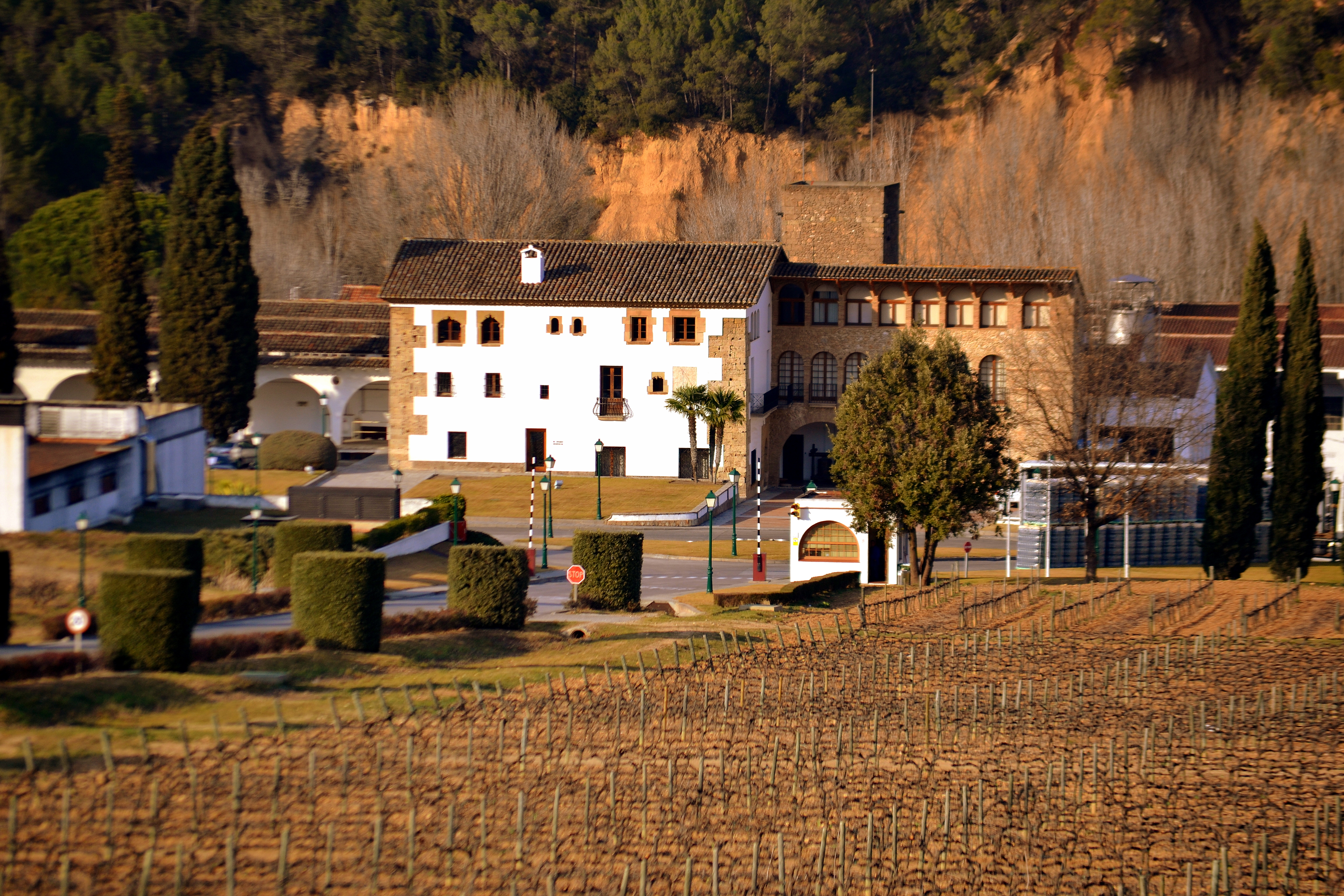
- A winery in Torrelavit

- Flag Coat of arms

- Location of Torrelavit Torrelavit (Catalonia) Torrelavit (Spain)
- Coordinates: 41°26′58″N 1°43′48″E
- Country: Spain
- Autonomous Community: Catalonia
- Province: Barcelona
- Comarca: Alt Penedès

Government
  - Mayor: Ramon Riera Bruch (2015)

Area
  - Total: 23.6 km^{2} (9.1 sq mi)
- Elevation: 202 m (663 ft)

Population (2025-01-01)
  - Total: 1,572
- Postal code: 08775
- Website: www.torrelavit.cat

Torrelavit, a portmanteau of Terrassola i Lavit (Catalan pronunciation: [tərəˈsɔləj ləˈβit]), is a municipality in the comarca of Alt Penedès, Barcelona, Catalonia, Spain. The municipal territory is home to several cavas, the most famous of which is Segura Viudas.
