= Sant Martí Sarroca =

- Municipality
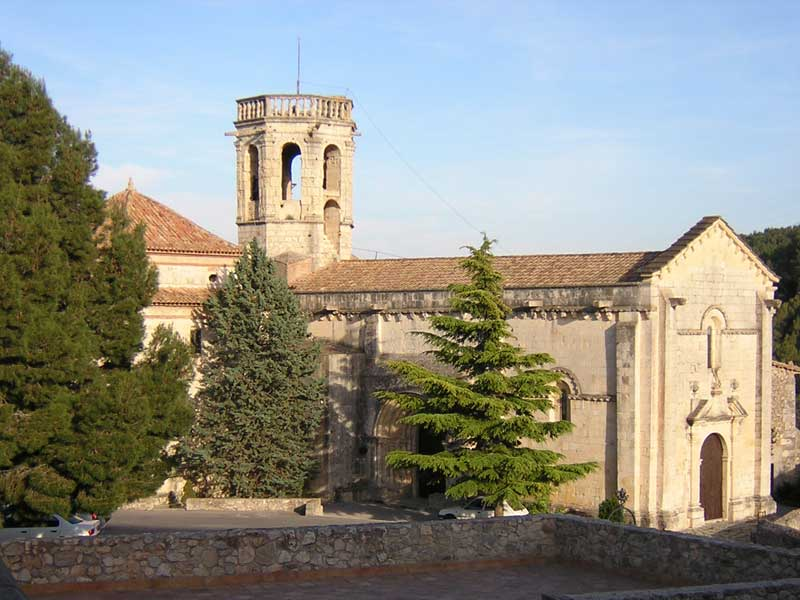
- Church of St. Mary.

- Coat of arms

- Location in Catalonia Sant Martí Sarroca (Catalonia) Sant Martí Sarroca (Spain)
- Coordinates: 41°23′14″N 1°36′43″E
- Country: Spain
- Community: Catalonia
- Province: Barcelona
- Comarca: Alt Penedès

Government
  - Mayor: Antoni Ventura Lluvià (2015)

Area
  - Total: 35.3 km^{2} (13.6 sq mi)
- Elevation: 291 m (955 ft)

Population (2025-01-01)
  - Total: 3,485
  - Density: 98.7/km^{2} (256/sq mi)
- Demonym: Martinenc
- Postal code: 08731
- Website: santmartisarroca.cat

Sant Martí Sarroca (Catalan pronunciation: [ˈsam məɾˈti səˈrɔkə]) is a municipality in the comarca of Alt Penedès, Barcelona, Catalonia, Spain.
