= Santa Margarida i els Monjos =

- Municipality
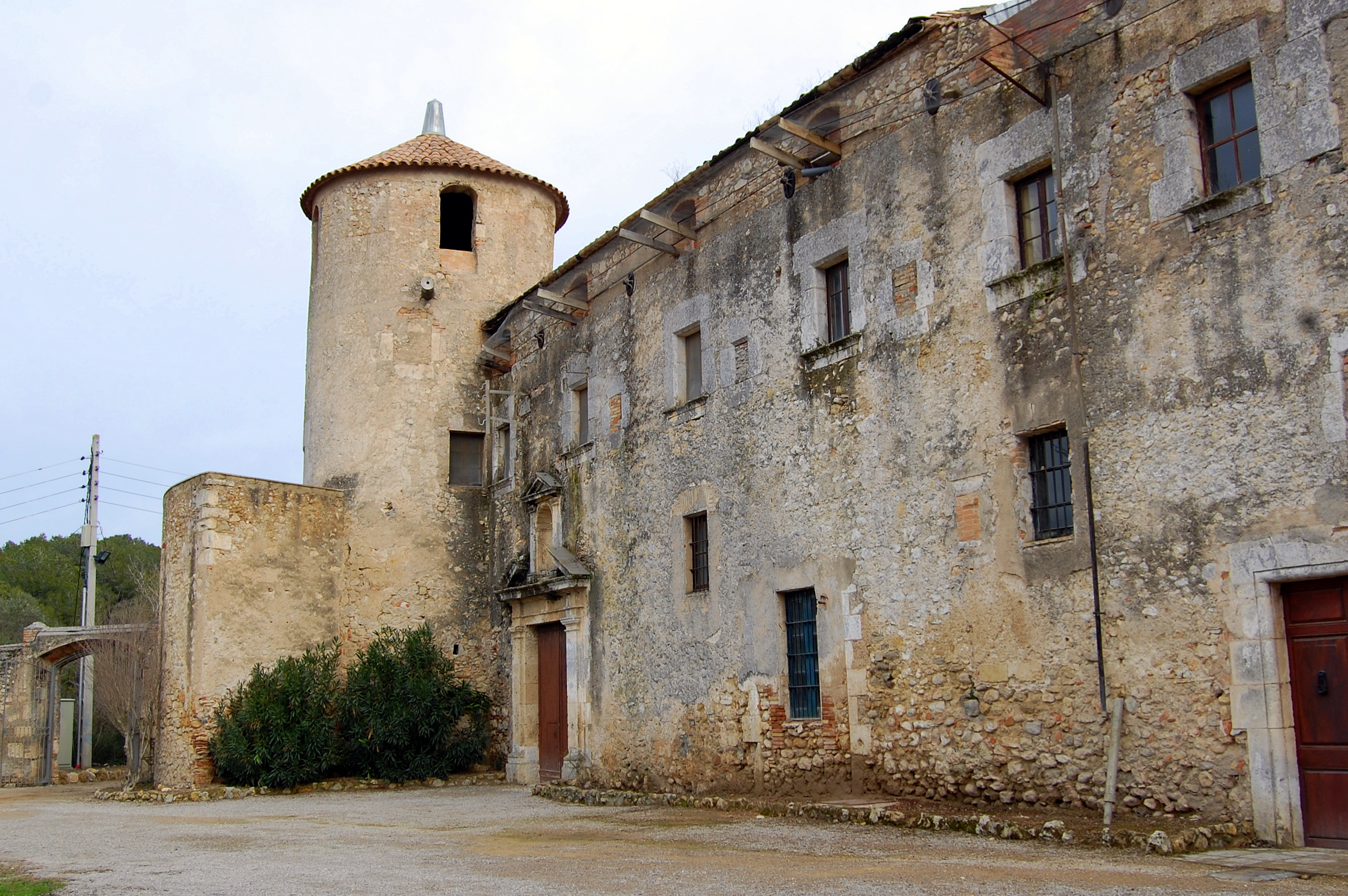
- Castle and convent of Penyafort

- Flag Coat of arms

- Location in Catalonia Santa Margarida i els Monjos (Spain)
- Coordinates: 41°19′23″N 1°39′53″E
- Country: Spain
- Community: Catalonia
- Province: Barcelona
- Comarca: Alt Penedès

Government
  - Mayor: Immaculada Ferret Raventós (2015)

Area
  - Total: 17.2 km^{2} (6.6 sq mi)

Population (2025)
  - Total: 7,806
  - Density: 454/km^{2} (1,180/sq mi)
- Website: santamargaridaielsmonjos.cat

Santa Margarida i els Monjos (Catalan pronunciation: [ˈsantə məɾɣəˈɾiðə jəlz ˈmɔɲʒus]) is a municipality in the comarca of Alt Penedès, Barcelona, Catalonia, Spain.
