= Sant Pere de Riudebitlles =

- Municipality
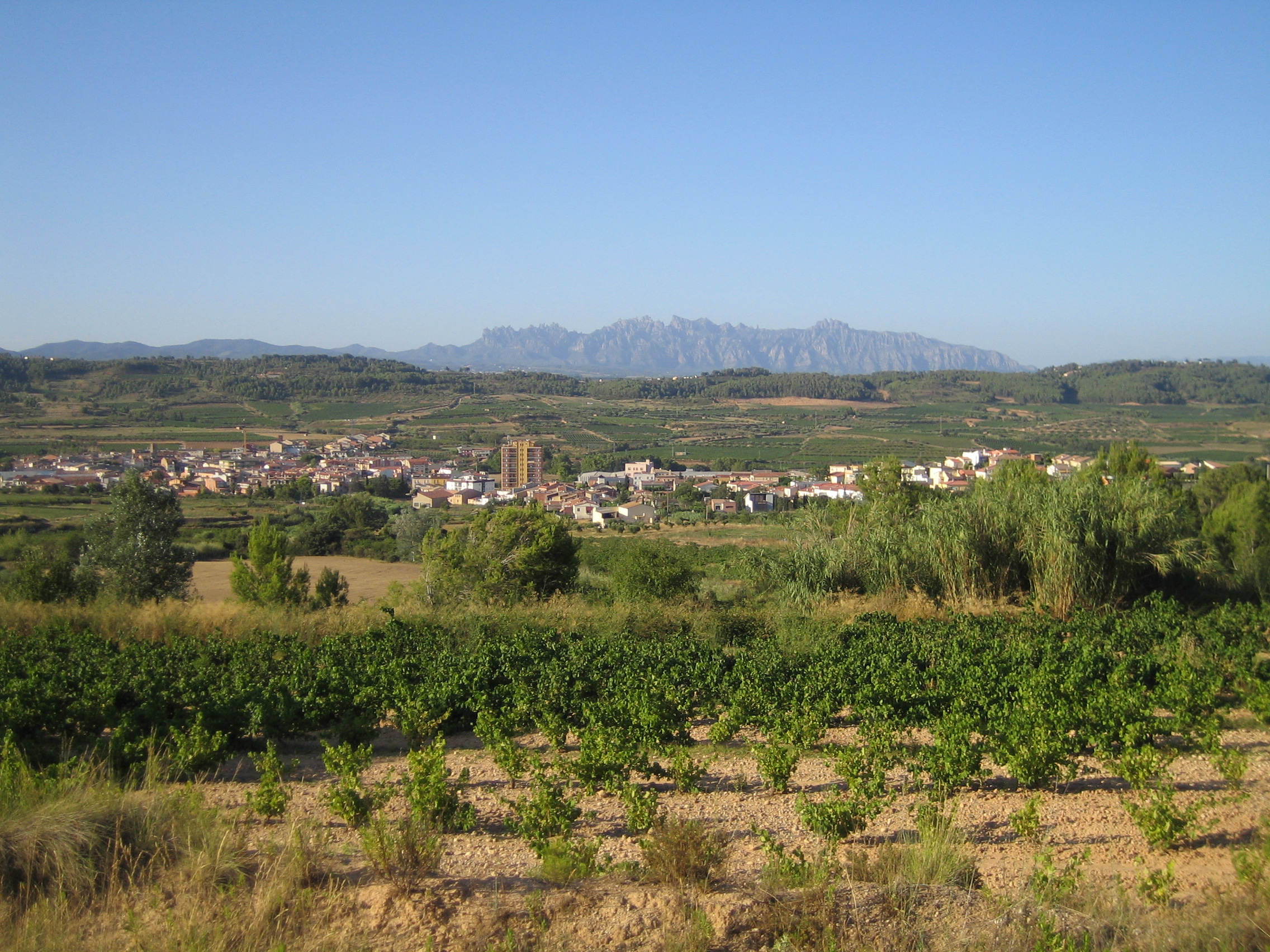

- Flag Coat of arms

- Location in Catalonia Sant Pere de Riudebitlles (Spain)
- Coordinates: 41°27′9″N 1°42′17″E
- Country: Spain
- Community: Catalonia
- Province: Barcelona
- Comarca: Alt Penedès

Government
  - Mayor: Rosa Maria Esteve Nadal (2015)

Area
  - Total: 5.4 km^{2} (2.1 sq mi)

Population (2025-01-01)
  - Total: 2,516
  - Density: 470/km^{2} (1,200/sq mi)
- Website: www.santperederiudebitlles.cat

Sant Pere de Riudebitlles (Catalan pronunciation: [ˈsam ˈpeɾə ðə ˌriwðəˈβiʎʎəs]) is a municipality in the comarca of Alt Penedès, Barcelona, Catalonia, Spain.
