= Rellinars =

- Municipality
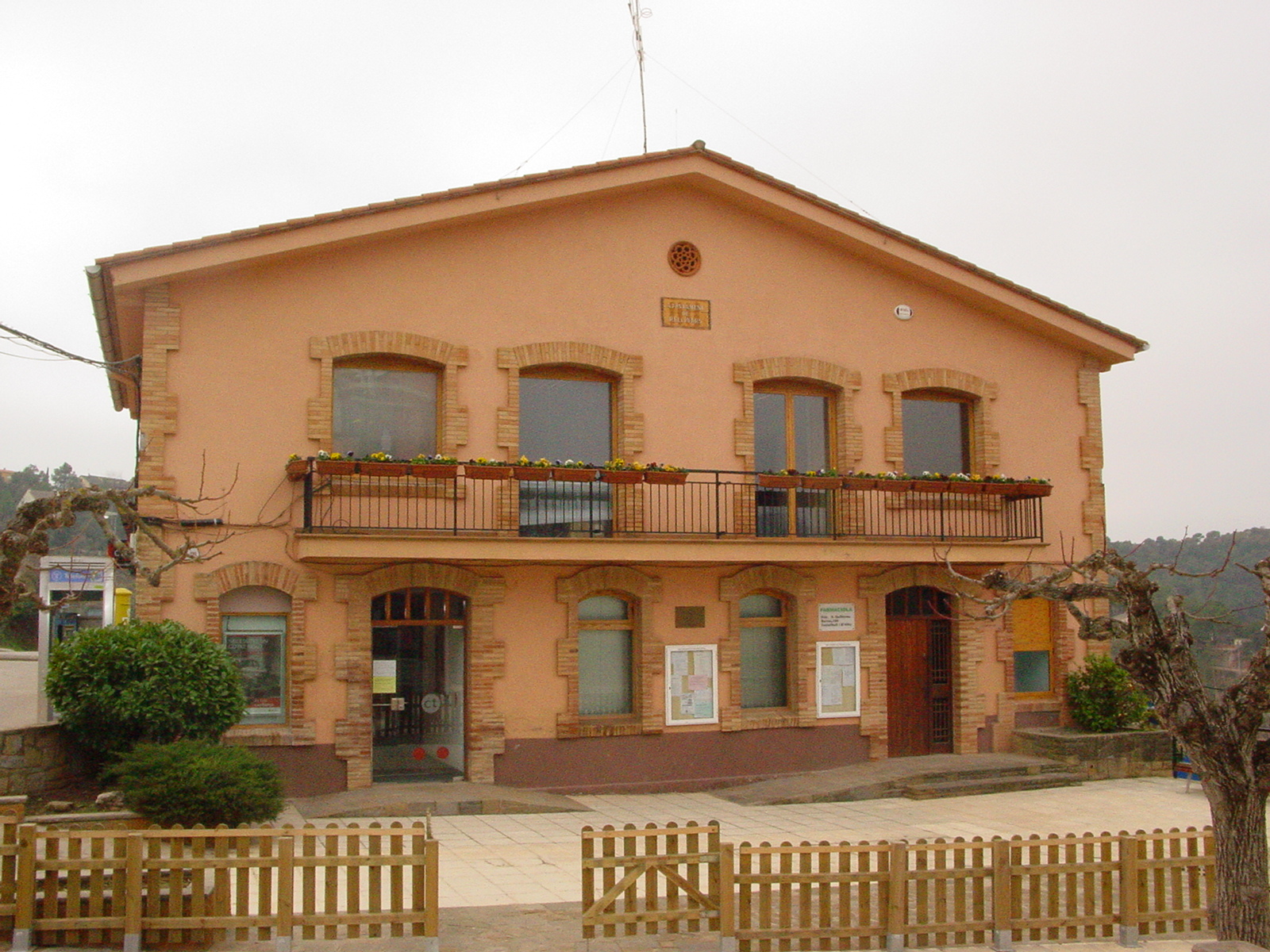
- Municipal office

- Flag Coat of arms

- Location in Catalonia Rellinars (Spain)
- Coordinates: 41.637°N 1.910°E
- Country: Spain
- Community: Catalonia
- Province: Barcelona
- Comarca: Vallès Occidental

Government
  - Mayor: Marta Roqué Aubia (2015)

Area
  - Total: 17.8 km^{2} (6.9 sq mi)

Population (2025-01-01)
  - Total: 926
  - Density: 52.0/km^{2} (135/sq mi)
- Website: www.rellinars.cat

Rellinars (Catalan pronunciation: [rəʎiˈnas]) is a municipality in the province of Barcelona and autonomous community of Catalonia, Spain. The municipality covers an area of 17.79 square kilometres (6.87 sq mi) and the population in 2014 was 726.
