= Font-rubí =

- Municipality
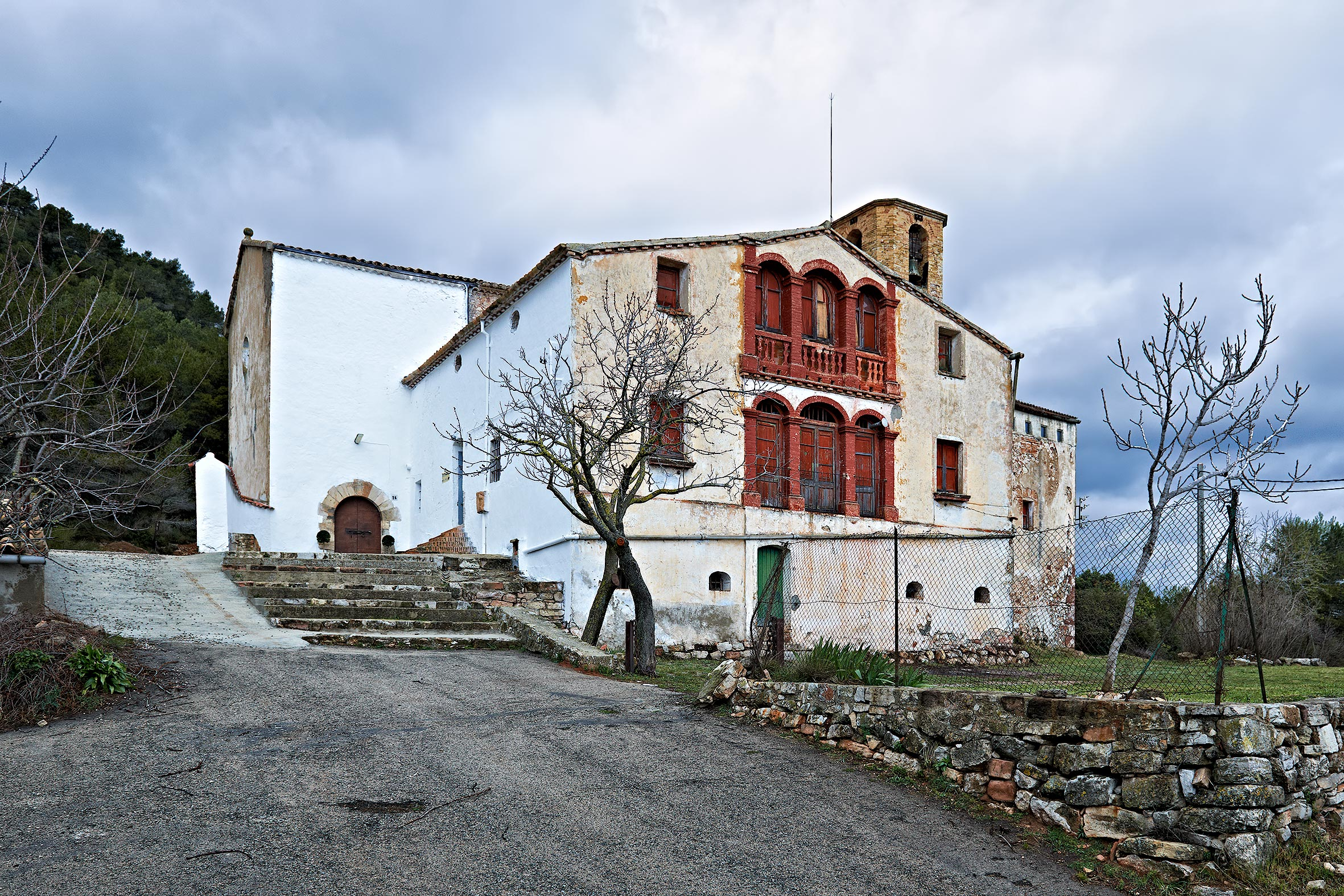
- Ermita de Santa Maria and Casa de Colònies, Font Rubí

- Flag Coat of arms

- Location in Catalonia Font-rubí (Spain)
- Coordinates: 41.437°N 1.588°E
- Country: Spain
- Community: Catalonia
- Province: Barcelona
- Comarca: Alt Penedès

Government
  - Mayor: Xavier Lluch Llopart (2015)

Area
  - Total: 37.4 km^{2} (14.4 sq mi)

Population (2025-01-01)
  - Total: 1,441
  - Density: 38.5/km^{2} (99.8/sq mi)
- Website: www.font-rubi.org

Font-rubí (Catalan pronunciation: [ˌfɔnruˈβi]) is a municipality in the comarca of Alt Penedès, Barcelona, Catalonia, Spain. Its capital is the village of Guardiola de Font-rubí.
