= Puigdàlber =

- Municipality
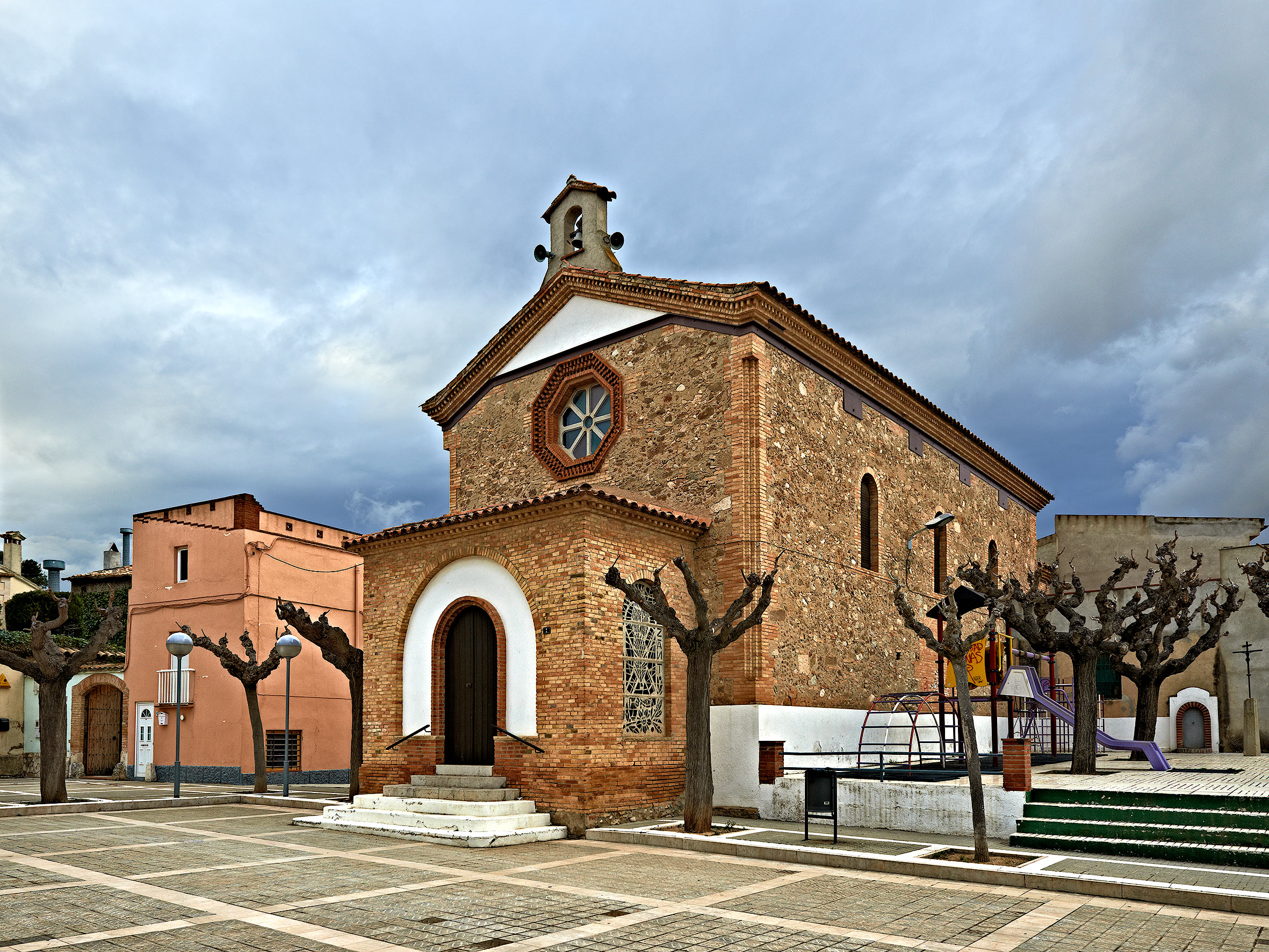
- Church square, Puigdàlber

- Flag Coat of arms

- Location in Catalonia Puigdàlber (Spain)
- Coordinates: 41°24′22″N 1°42′5″E
- Country: Spain
- Community: Catalonia
- Province: Barcelona
- Comarca: Alt Penedès

Government
  - Mayor: David Masdeu Baqués (2015)

Area
  - Total: 0.4 km^{2} (0.15 sq mi)

Population (2025-01-01)
  - Total: 621
  - Density: 1,600/km^{2} (4,000/sq mi)
- Website: www.puigdalber.cat

Puigdàlber (Catalan pronunciation: [pudʒˈðalβə]) is a municipality in the comarca of Alt Penedès, Barcelona, Catalonia, Spain.
