= Cabrera d'Anoia =

- Municipality
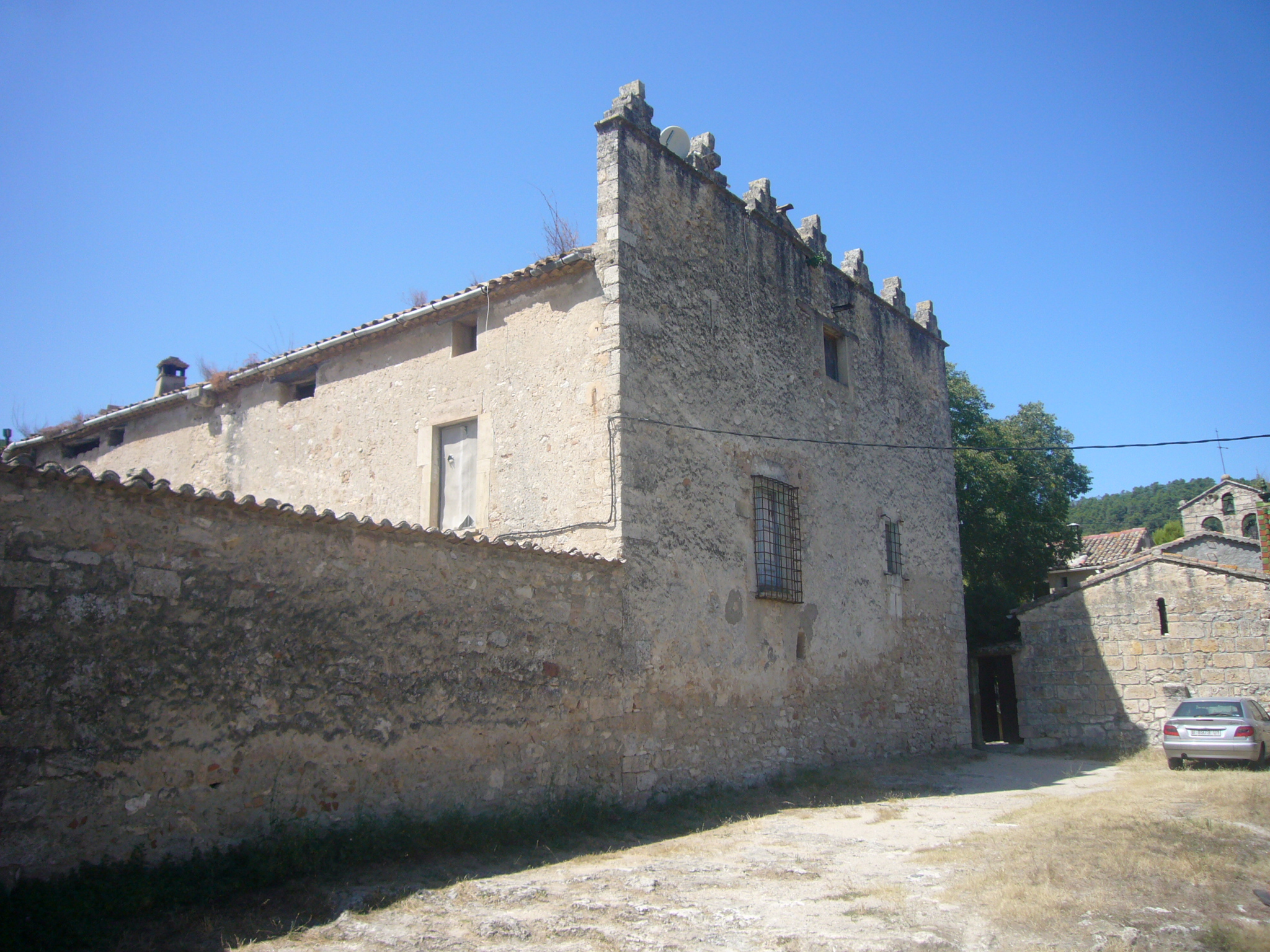
- Cabrera castela and church

- Coordinates: 41°28′46″N 1°42′17″E
- Country: Spain
- Autonomous community: Catalonia
- Province: Barcelona
- Comarca: Anoia

Government
  - Mayor: Jaume Gorrea Ortiz (2019)

Area
  - Total: 17.0 km^{2} (6.6 sq mi)
- Elevation: 347 m (1,138 ft)

Population (2025-01-01)
  - Total: 1,772
  - Density: 104/km^{2} (270/sq mi)
- Postal code: 08785
- Website: www.cabreradanoia.cat

Cabrera d'Anoia (Catalan pronunciation: [kəˈβɾeɾə ðəˈnɔjə]) is a municipality in the province of Barcelona, Catalonia, Spain. Until 2007 the official name of the municipality was Cabrera d'Igualada.

The municipality includes the following settlements: Can Ros, Castell de Cabrera, Canaletes, Can Gallego, Can Feixes, Agulladolç, Can Piquer.
