= Sant Quintí de Mediona =

- Municipality
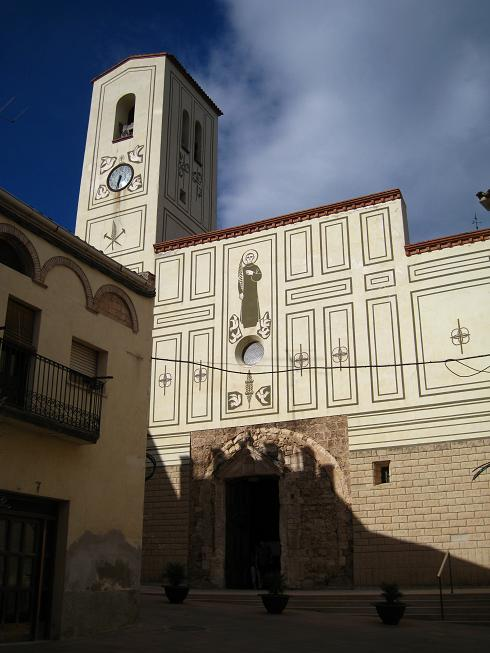
- Sant Quintí de Mediona church

- Location in Catalonia Sant Quintí de Mediona (Spain)
- Coordinates: 41°27′52″N 1°39′54″E
- Country: Spain
- Community: Catalonia
- Province: Barcelona
- Comarca: Alt Penedès

Government
  - Mayor: Pol Pagés Pont (2015)

Area
  - Total: 13.8 km^{2} (5.3 sq mi)

Population (2025-01-01)
  - Total: 2,580
  - Density: 187/km^{2} (484/sq mi)
- Website: www.santquintimediona.cat

Sant Quintí de Mediona (Catalan pronunciation: [ˈsaŋ kinˈti ðə məðiˈonə]) is a municipality in the comarca of Alt Penedès, Barcelona, Catalonia, Spain.
