= Alt Penedès =

Coordinates: 41°21′55″N 1°40′55″E

- Comarca
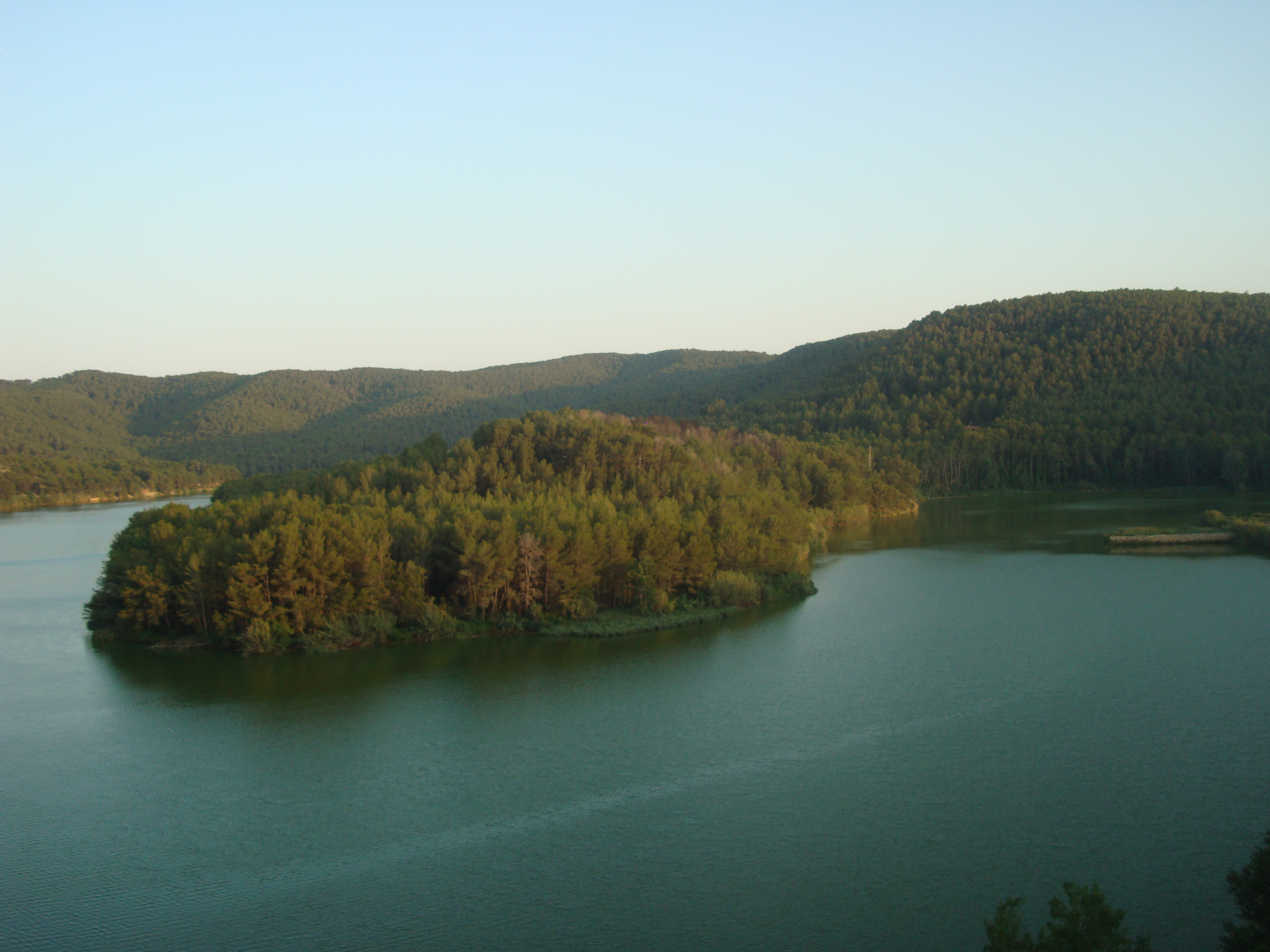
- The Foix Reservoir

- Country: Spain
- Autonomous community: Catalonia
- Region: Penedès
- Province: Barcelona
- Capital: Vilafranca del Penedès
- Municipalities: List: Avinyonet del Penedès, Les Cabanyes, Castellet i la Gornal, Castellví de la Marca, Font-rubí, Gelida, La Granada, Mediona, Olèrdola, Olesa de Bonesvalls, Pacs del Penedès, El Pla del Penedès, Pontons, Puigdàlber, Sant Cugat Sesgarrigues, Sant Llorenç d'Hortons, Sant Martí Sarroca, Sant Pere de Riudebitlles, Sant Quintí de Mediona, Sant Sadurní d'Anoia, Santa Fe del Penedès, Santa Margarida i els Monjos, Subirats, Torrelavit, Torrelles de Foix, Vilafranca del Penedès, Vilobí del Penedès

Government
  - Body: Alt Penedès Comarcal Council
  - President: Xavier Lluch (Impulsem–Junts)

Area
  - Total: 592.7 km^{2} (228.8 sq mi)

Population (2024)
  - Total: 112,460
  - Density: 189.7/km^{2} (491.4/sq mi)
- Demonym
- Time zone: UTC+1 (CET)
  - Summer (DST): UTC+2 (CEST)
- Largest municipality: Vilafranca del Penedès
- Website: Official website

Alt Penedès (Catalan pronunciation: [ˈal pənəˈðɛs]) is a comarca (county) in the Penedès region, in Catalonia, Spain. The capital is Vilafranca del Penedès.

== Municipalities ==
Municipality	Population (2014)	Area km^{2}
Avinyonet del Penedès	1,675	29.1
Les Cabanyes	961	1.2
Castellet i la Gornal	2,237	47.5
Castellví de la Marca	1,589	28.4
Font-rubí	1,353	37.4
Gelida	7,194	26.7
La Granada	2,073	6.5
Mediona	2,311	47.6
Olèrdola	3,579	30.2
Olesa de Bonesvalls	1,735	30.8
Pacs del Penedès	892	6.3
El Pla del Penedès	1,223	9.6
Pontons	477	25.9
Puigdàlber	532	0.4
Sant Cugat Sesgarrigues	972	6.2
Sant Llorenç d'Hortons	2,517	19.7
Sant Martí Sarroca	3,130	35.3
Sant Pere de Riudebitlles	2,364	5.4
Sant Quintí de Mediona	2,101	13.8
Sant Sadurní d'Anoia	12,590	19.0
Santa Fe del Penedès	379	3.4
Santa Margarida i els Monjos	7,337	17.2
Subirats	3,029	55.9
Torrelavit	1,393	23.6
Torrelles de Foix	2,308	36.7
Vilafranca del Penedès	39,221	19.6
Vilobí del Penedès	1,090	9.3
• Total: 27	106,262	592.7

== Comarcal Council ==
Councilors in the Comarcal Council of Alt Penedès since 1987
Key to parties CUP ICV–EUiA–EPM BComú–E (ENTESA) En Comú–ECG ERC AAAP PSC JxCat Junts PDeCAT CiU PP
Election	Distribution	President
1987	1 / 10 / 14	Joan Raventós Pujadó (CiU)
1991	1 / 10 / 14	Pere Parera Cartró (CiU)
1995	2 / 9 / 1 / 12 / 1	Joan Amat Solé (CiU) (1995-1997)
1995	2 / 9 / 1 / 12 / 1	Raimon Gusi Amigó (CiU) (1997-1999)
1999	2 / 10 / 1 / 11 / 1	Angèlica Rodríguez Herrera (CiU)
2003	3 / 11 / 10 / 1	Lluís Valls Comas (PSC) (2003-2005)
2003	3 / 11 / 10 / 1	Ramon Xena Pareta (ERC) (2005-2007)
2007	1 / 3 / 10 / 10 / 1	Francesc Olivella (CiU) (2007-2009)
2007	1 / 3 / 10 / 10 / 1	Jordi Girona Alaiza (PSC) (2009-2011)
2011	1 / 1 / 3 / 12 / 14 / 2	Francesc Olivella (CiU)
2015	3 / 2 / 6 / 9 / 12 / 1	Francesc Olivella (PDeCAT) (2015-2017)
2015	3 / 2 / 6 / 9 / 12 / 1	Xavier Lluch (PDeCAT) (2017-2019)
2019	3 / 1 / 10 / 7 / 12	Xavier Lluch (PDeCAT)
2023	2 / 10 / 9 / 11 / 1	Xavier Lluch (Impulsem-Junts)
