= Vilobí del Penedès =

- Municipality
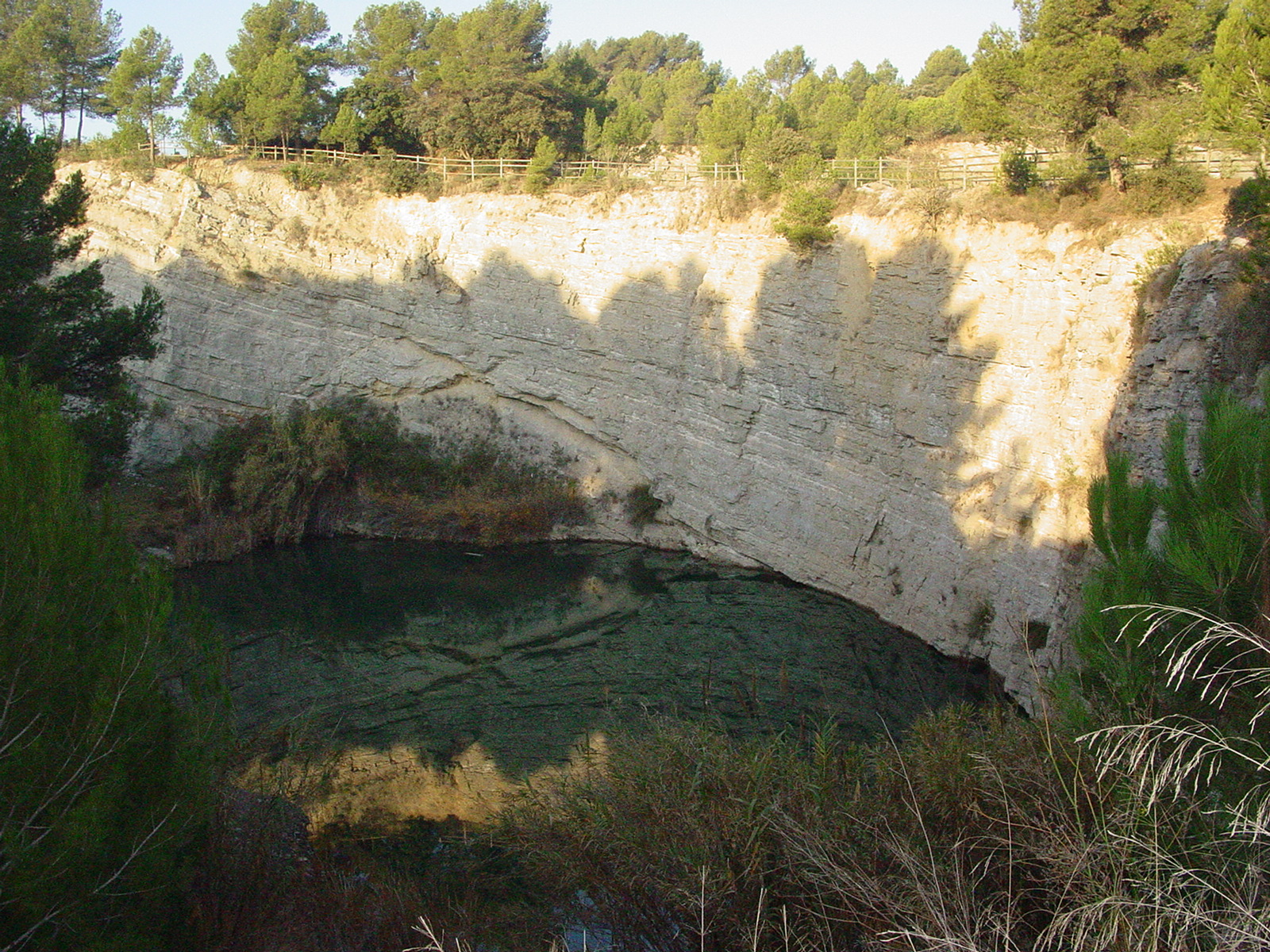

- Flag Coat of arms

- Location within Province of Barcelona Location within Spain
- Coordinates: 41°23′26″N 1°39′45″E
- Country: Spain
- Autonomous Community: Catalonia
- Province: Barcelona
- Comarca: Alt Penedès

Government
  - Mayor: Joan Esteve Ràfols (Francesc Xavier Edo Vargas (2015))

Area
  - Total: 9.3 km^{2} (3.6 sq mi)

Population (2025-01-01)
  - Total: 1,154
- Demonym: Vilovilenc
- Postal code: 08735
- Website: www.vilobi.cat

Vilobí del Penedès (Catalan pronunciation: [biluˈβi ðəl pənəˈðɛs]) is a municipality in the comarca of Alt Penedès, Barcelona, Catalonia, Spain.
