= Avinyonet del Penedès =

- Municipality
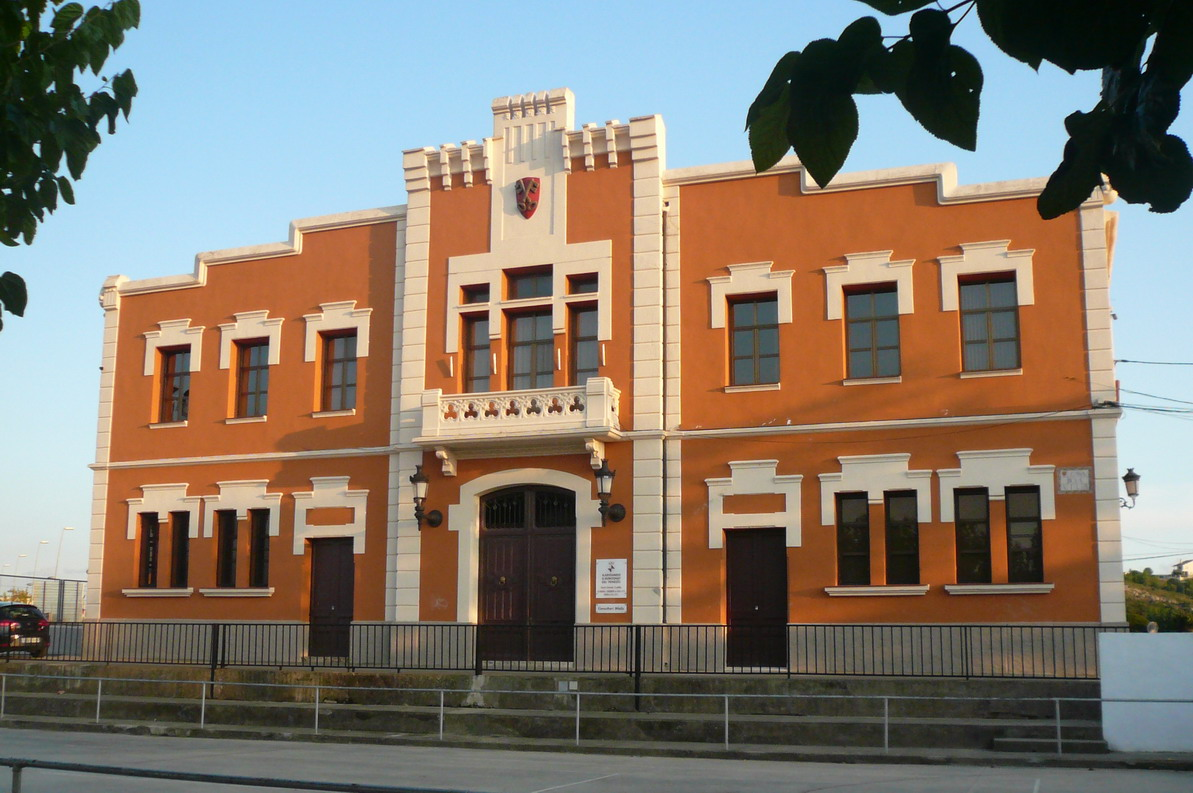
- Town hall of Avinyonet

- Coat of arms

- Location in Catalonia Avinyonet del Penedès (Spain)
- Coordinates: 41°21′47″N 1°46′44″E
- Country: Spain
- Community: Catalonia
- Province: Barcelona
- Comarca: Alt Penedès

Government
  - Mayor: Oriol De la Cruz Marcè (2015)

Area
  - Total: 29.1 km^{2} (11.2 sq mi)
- Elevation: 280 m (920 ft)

Population (2025-01-01)
  - Total: 1,782
  - Density: 61.2/km^{2} (159/sq mi)
- Demonym(s): Avinyonetenc, avinyonetenca
- Website: avinyonet.org

Avinyonet del Penedès (Catalan pronunciation: [əβiɲuˈnɛd dəl pənəˈðɛs]) is a municipality in the comarca of the Alt Penedès in Catalonia, Spain. It is situated in the south-east of the comarca, and is served by the N-340 road between Barcelona and Tarragona. The ajuntament (town hall) is in Les Cabòries. The romanesque Benedictine monastery of Sant Sebastià dels Gorgs has been partially restored.

== Demography ==
1900	1930	1950	1970	1986	2007
1452	1464	1257	1161	1187	1588
