= Bon Preu Group =

Supermarket and hypermarket chain in Catalonia

Bon Preu SAU

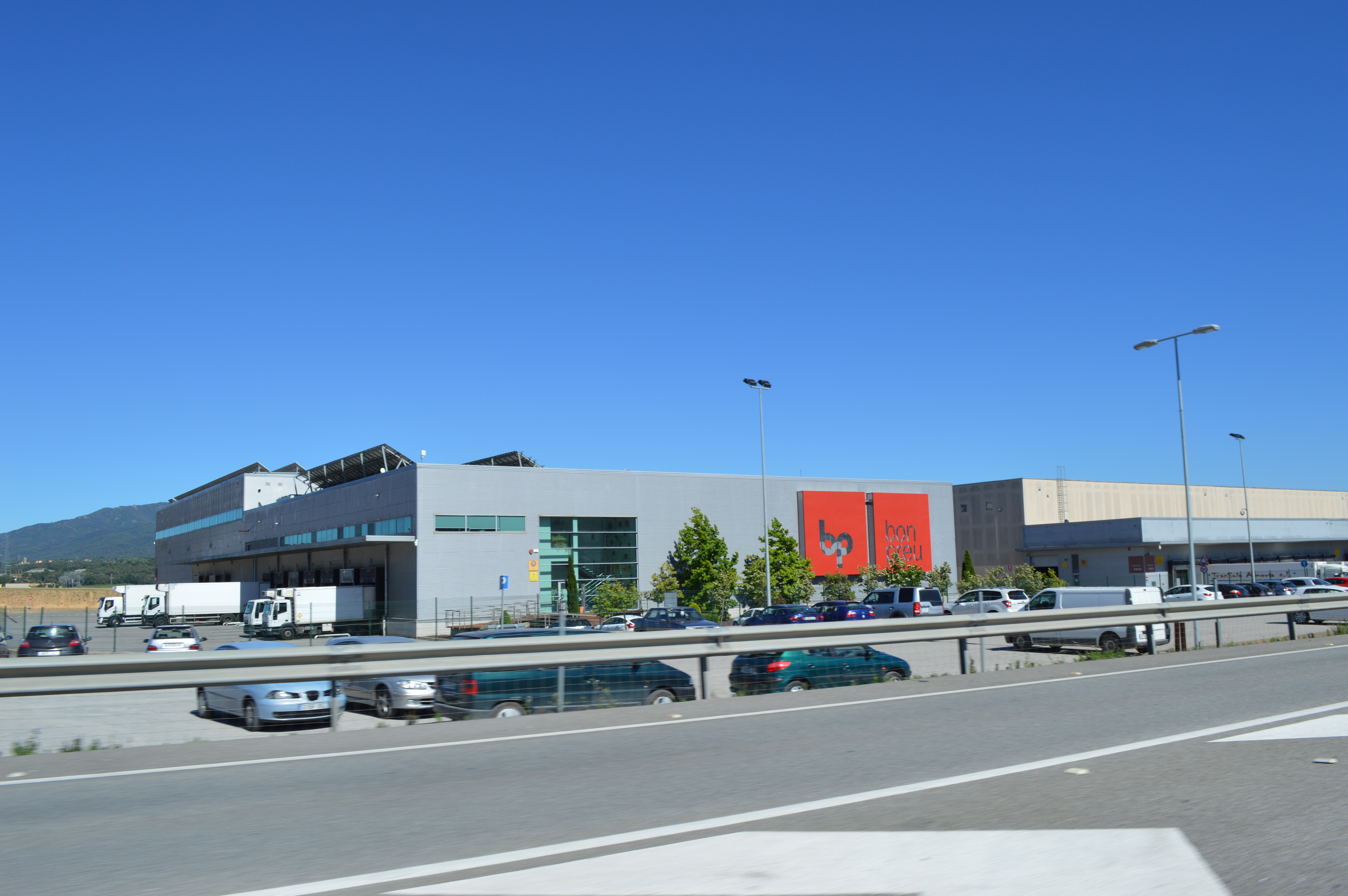
- Bon Preu group warehouse in Balenyà.
- Type: Private
- Industry: Retail
- Founded: 1974; 52 years ago Les Masies de Voltregà, Catalonia, Spain
- Founder: Josep Font i Fabregó; Joan Font i Fabregó
- Number of locations: 193 stores (2024)
- Area served: Catalonia
- Key people: Joan Font i Fabregó (chairman)
- Products: Supermarkets; Hypermarkets; Convenience stores; Filling stations; Electricity supplier
- Revenue: ▲€2.259 billion (2024)
- Net income: ▲€75 million (2024)
- Number of employees: 10,800 (2024)
- Website: www.bonpreuesclat.cat

Bon Preu Group (Catalan pronunciation: [ˌbɔmˈpɾɛw]) is a supermarket and hypermarket chain in Catalonia with more than 200 stores and €2.5 billion turnover in 2024, based in Les Masies de Voltregà (Osona, Catalonia, Spain). Founded in 1974 by the brothers Joan Font Fabregó and Josep Font Fabregó the company started as a self-service store in Manlleu.

== History ==
Logos of Bon Preu and Esclat supermarket chains

In 1988, the company opened the first hypermarket, called Esclat, in Vilafranca del Penedès. A few years later they opened the first filling station, in 1995, in Malla. From 1998 to 2011, the company established a group of supermarkets of medium-sized called Orangutan that later on would be renamed as Bonpreu. In 2004, they opened the first meat processing plant and warehouse in Balenyà, powered by photovoltaic panels. In 2007, this meat processing plant would be enhanced with a cold store and a new type of fast convenience store was introduced, Bonpreu Ràpid. In 2010, the Bon Preu Group acquired the Spanish stores of the French group Intermarché.

In 2017, the Bon Preu Group employed more than 6,000 people and owned 221 stores: 123 Bonpreu supermarkets, 47 Esclat hypermarkets, 3 Iquodrive online delivery shops, 41 Esclatoil filling stations and 8 ministores. In 2016, the company increased its turnover to just over €1 million, a 9.2% more than the previous year, invested €103 million and had a net income of €36 million.

The company has supported local food production and, since 2015, Bon Preu introduced kilometre zero products in all their stores. In August 2008, the company joined the campaign "Please speak to me in Catalan" (Si us plau, parla'm en català), promoted by several public and private organizations, with the aim of contributing to the social use of the Catalan language.

In 2021, it announced the construction of its second major logistics center at the Montblanc Intermodal Logistics Activities Center.

== Awards ==
III Martí Gasull i Roig Award (2016), presented by Plataforma per la Llengua.

== See also ==
- Dia (supermarket chain)
- Hipercor
- Mercadona
- Eroski
