= L'Abella =

Coordinates: 41.7106°N 2.2487°E

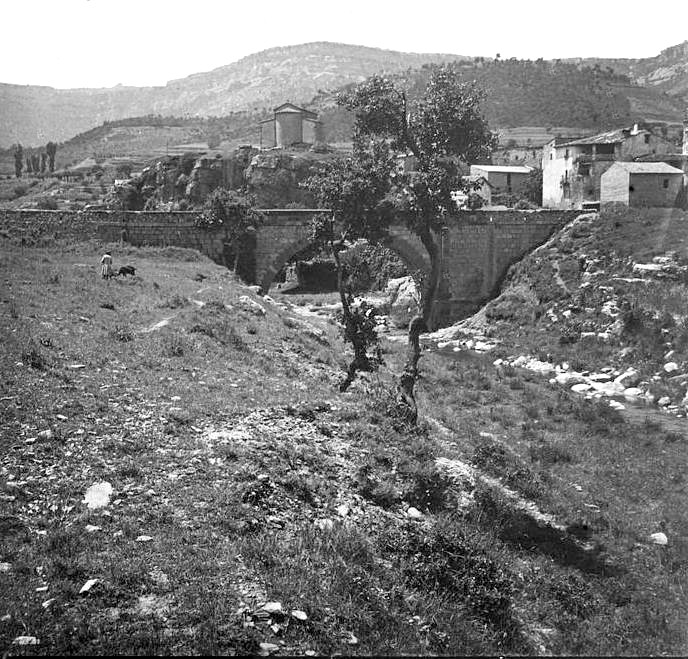
L'Abella

L'Abella is a district in the municipality of Sant Martí de Centelles, in the comarca of Osona (Barcelona, Catalonia, Spain). According to the municipal register of 2013, there were 714 inhabitants, making it the largest population cluster in the municipality.
