= Besora =

Besora may refer to:

- Besora Castle, a castle in Catalonia
- Joaquim Besora (born 1980), a Spanish-born Andorran footballer and former futsal player

== See also ==
- Bessora (born 1968), a French-language writer
