= Santa Maria de Besora =

- Municipality
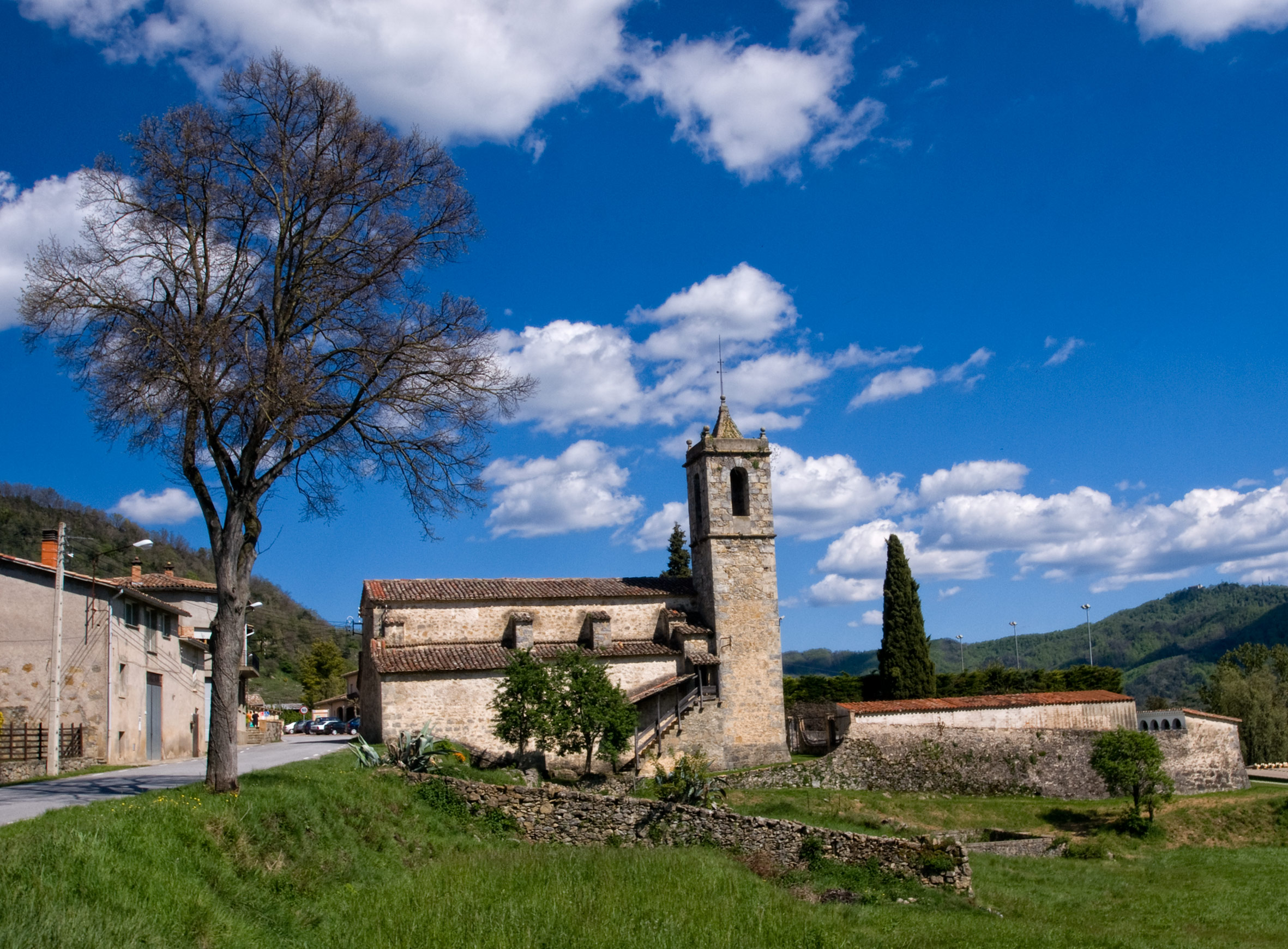

- Coat of arms

- Location in Catalonia Santa Maria de Besora (Spain)
- Coordinates: 42°07′46″N 2°15′32″E
- Country: Spain
- Community: Catalonia
- Province: Barcelona
- Comarca: Osona

Government
  - Mayor: Camil Adam Vilarrasa (2015)

Area
  - Total: 24.7 km^{2} (9.5 sq mi)
- Elevation: 866 m (2,841 ft)

Population (2025-01-01)
  - Total: 164
  - Density: 6.64/km^{2} (17.2/sq mi)
- Demonym(s): Besorenc, besorenca
- Website: www.santamariabesora.cat

Santa Maria de Besora (Catalan pronunciation: [ˈsantə məˈɾiə ðə βəˈzɔɾə]) is a municipality in the comarca of Osona in Catalonia, Spain. It is situated on the north side of the Bellmunt range in the north of the comarca. It is linked to Sant Quirze de Besora and to Vidrà by a local road. Besora castle has an eleventh-century Romanesque church: there is also a pre-Roman chapel at Sant Moí. Santa Maria de Besora became part of Osona in the comarcal revision of 1990: previously it formed part of the Ripollès.

== Demography ==
1900	1930	1950	1970	1986	2007
467	449	364	259	200	183
