= Viladrau =

- Municipality
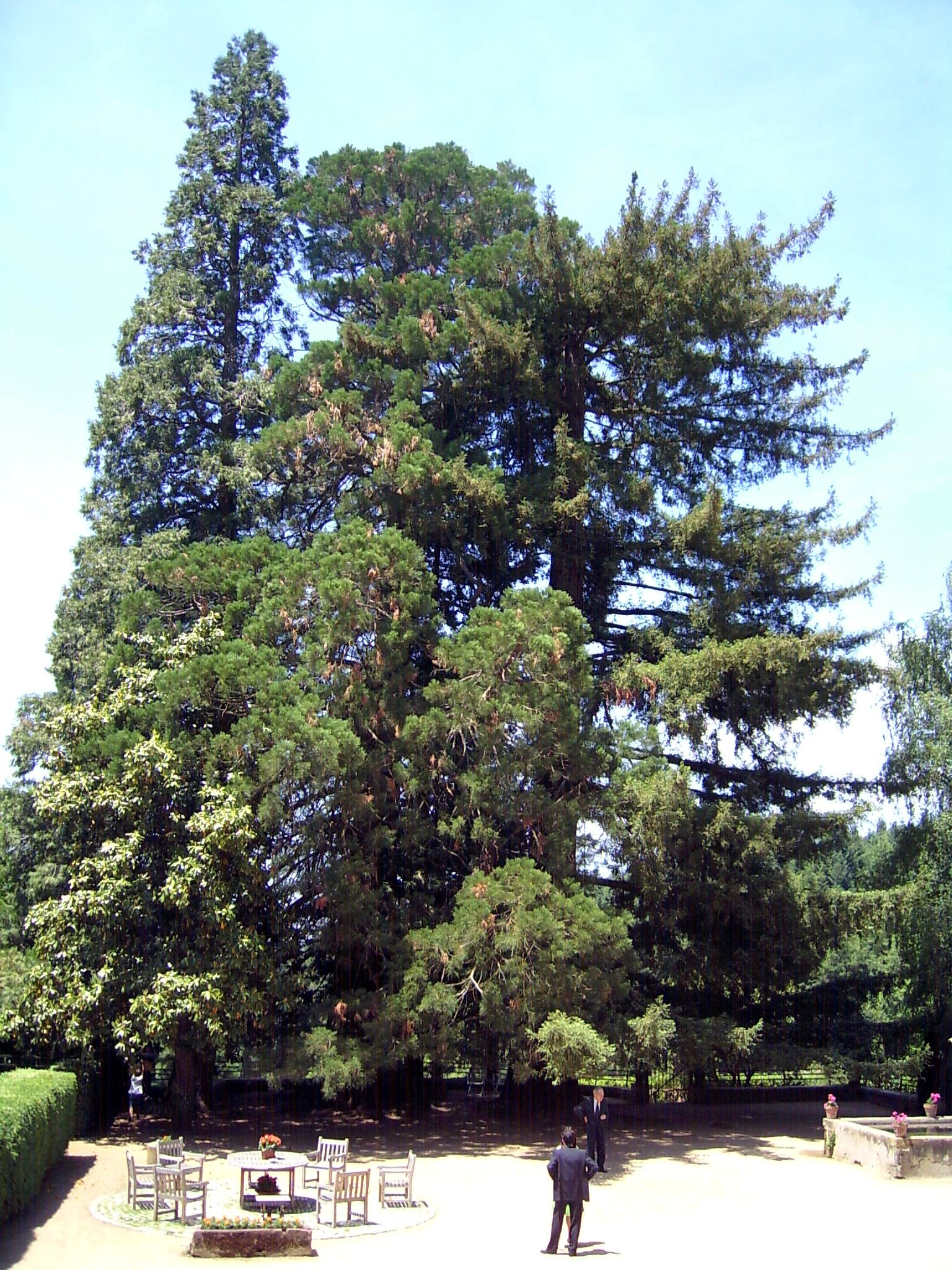
- Sequoia tree at El Noguer, Viladrau

- Flag Coat of arms

- Location in Catalonia Viladrau (Spain)
- Coordinates: 41°51′N 2°24′E
- Country: Spain
- Community: Catalonia
- Province: Girona
- Comarca: Osona

Government
  - Mayor: Margarida Feliu Portabella (2015)

Area
  - Total: 50.7 km^{2} (19.6 sq mi)
- Elevation: 821 m (2,694 ft)

Population (2025-01-01)
  - Total: 1,184
  - Density: 23.4/km^{2} (60.5/sq mi)
- Demonym(s): Viladrauenc, viladrauenca
- Website: www.viladrau.cat

Viladrau (Catalan pronunciation: [ˌbiləˈðɾaw]) is a municipality in the comarca of Osona in Catalonia, Spain. It is situated in the south-east of the comarca, beneath the massifs of the Guilleries and the Montseny, and is served by the GE-520 road, which links the municipality with the comarca of the Selva and with the N-152 road at Tona. The local mineral water is well known.

== Demography ==
1900	1930	1950	1970	1986	2007
974	1001	962	787	802	1036
