= Miquel Obiols =

Spanish writer (1945–2024)

Miquel Obiols (1945 – 27 October 2024) was a Spanish writer. He was born in Roda de Ter. He went to university to study pharmacy but finished with a degree in Romance languages. He is best known for his work for children and young adults. In 1977, he published ¡Ai, Filomena, Filomena! He was one of the creators of the first Catalan television program for children called Terra d’escudella. He went on to develop other shows for television, such as Planeta Imaginari and Juego de Niños. He also worked in the theatre; La Nit de Sant Joan de Dagoll Dagom was a stage adaptation of his book A l’inrevés.

Among his books for young readers are:

- El misterio de Buster Keaton (1980),
- El tigre de Mary Plexiglás (1987),
- Libro de las M’Alicias (1990; Kalandraka, 2009),
- 77 Histèries (1990),
- El quadre més bonic del món (2001),
- L’aigua està malalta (2002),
- Una d’indis (2002),
- Datrebil. Siete cuentos y un espejo (Espasa Calpe, 1989) (chosen by the Fundación Germán Sánchez Ruipérez as one of the best Spanish works of the 20th century)

Obiols won numerous literary prizes (Joaquim Ruyra, Ministerio de Cultura, Generalitat de Catalunya, Critici in Erba de Bologna, Crítica Serra d’Or (twice). He enjoyed the theatre, film, and painting.

Obiols died in Taradell on 27 October 2024, at the age of 79.
