= Muntanyola =

- Municipality
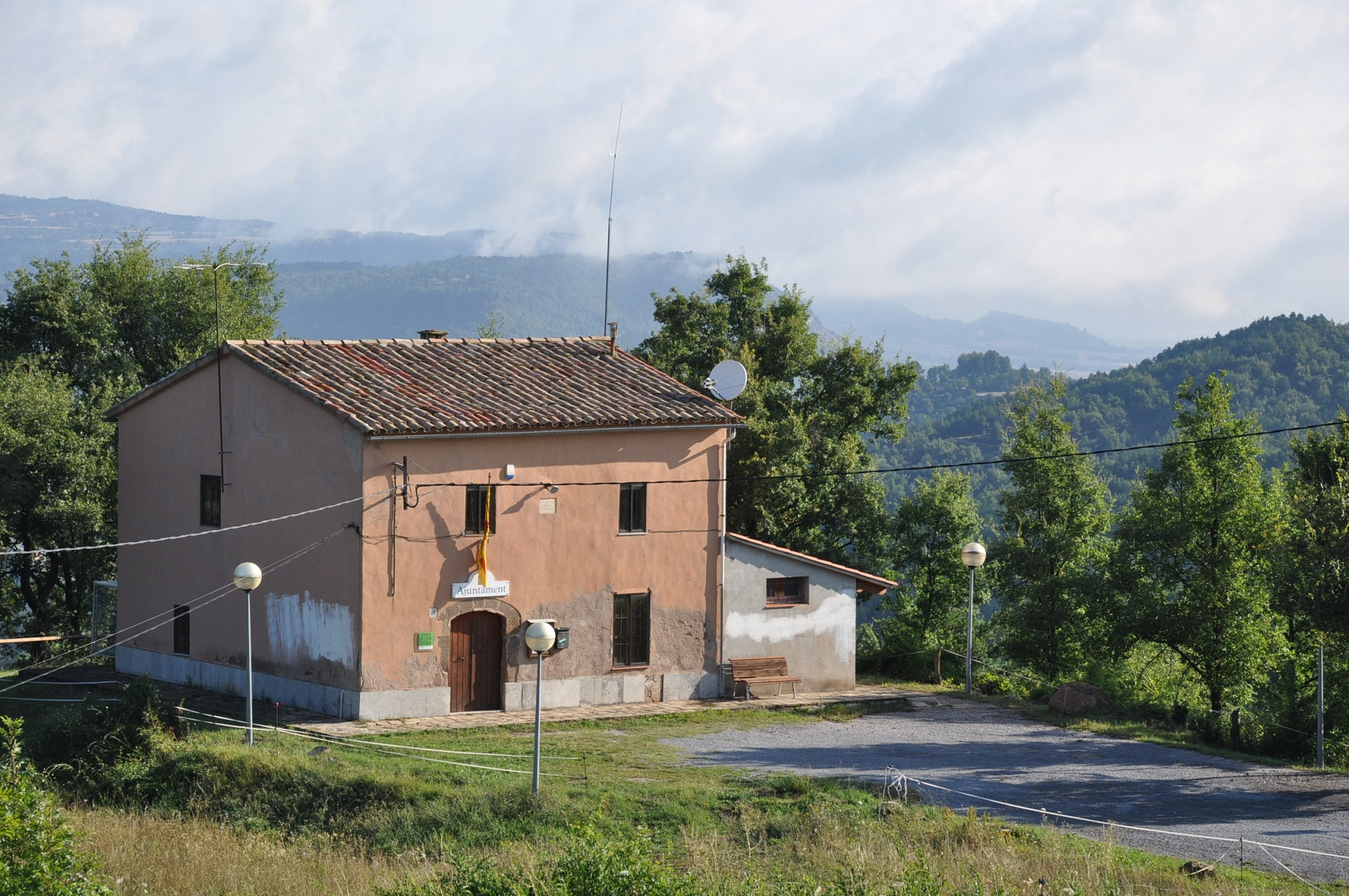
- Muntanyola town hall

- Coat of arms

- Location in Catalonia
- Coordinates: 41°52′49″N 2°10′47″E
- Country: Spain
- Community: Catalonia
- Province: Barcelona
- Comarca: Osona

Government
  - Mayor: Carles Morera Calm (2019)

Area
  - Total: 40.3 km^{2} (15.6 sq mi)
- Elevation: 807 m (2,648 ft)

Population (2025-01-01)
  - Total: 697
  - Density: 17.3/km^{2} (44.8/sq mi)
- Postal code: 081290
- Website: www.muntanyola.cat

Muntanyola (Catalan pronunciation: [muntəˈɲɔlə]) is a municipality in the comarca of Osona, Catalonia, northern Spain.

== General description ==
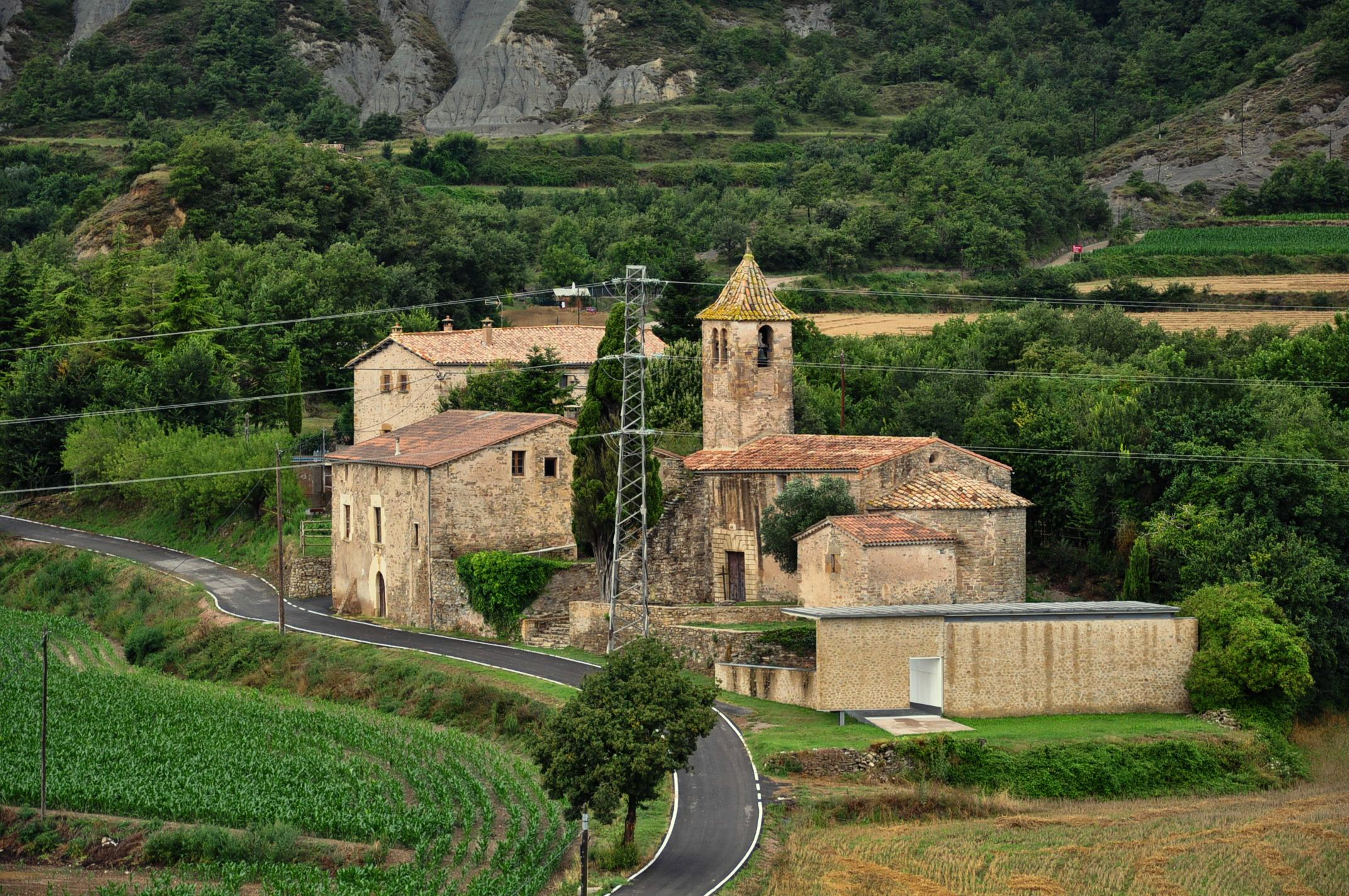
Parish Church of St. Stephen in the hamlet of Múnter (Muntanyola municipality)

The village of Muntanyola is a-typical in that it does not have a center. 75% of the municipality's area consists of forested hills between 650 and 1000 m. altitude, with scattered farms and fields. The build-up area is in the higher elevations and mainly consists of two real estate developments - in Spanish: 'urbanizations' - called Muntanyola and Fontanelles, respectively. Both these neighbourhoods consist of lanes with upmarket free-standing villa's with large gardens. Centrally located in the 'Muntanyola urbanization' are the school, a tennis court, sports hall, swimming pool, playground and restaurant. The church and town hall stand rather isolated in the hills on the northern side of the Muntanyola-development. The municipality also includes the old hamlet of Múnter in its lower elevations, sloping down to the Plain of Vic (Plana de Vic). The municipality is also odd in that its territory consists of four non-contiguous areas, i.e. a main area with three exclaves. Muntanyola, Fontanelles and Múnter are all in the main area, but Múnter can be reached from Muntanyola by a rural path or via the territory of the adjacent municipality of Tona

== Population and economy ==
The current structure of the municipality is reflected in its population curve. From 1900-1950 the population remained stable between 400 and 450 people, sharply decreasing from the 1960s with only 171 people remaining in the early 1990s. This decrease is likely due to people moving away from isolated farms. Starting in the 1990s, a sharp increase takes place to 568 in 2011, simultaneously with a 2.5-fold increase in the number of homes: undoubtedly due to the construction of both 'urbanizations'.

The economy of Muntanyola is based on rainfed agriculture, forestry and cattle raising for the sausage industry. There are more than 10,000 pigs in Muntanyola. Tourism is not a major source of income.

== History ==
Muntanyola and Múnter are very old. The church of St. Quiricus and St. Julietta of Muntanyola was first documented in 938. The current church (on the same location) is from the 17th century, built and decorated with the simple forms of the Spanish Baroque. It holds some baroque paintings. The hamlet of Múnter and its church of St. Stephen appeared in documents for the first time in 929 under the name villa de Montari. Both churches are the main places of interest in the municipality. Múnter also had a castle on a small hill close to the church. Of this castle only a ruined wall segment remains.
