= Lluis Codina =

Spanish footballer and manager

Personal information
- Full name: Lluis Codina Codina
- Date of birth: 17 February 1973 (age 53)
- Place of birth: Taradell, Spain
- Height: 1.68 m (5 ft 6 in)
- Position: Attacking midfielder

Youth career
- Español

Senior career*
Years	Team	Apps	(Gls)
1992–1994	Hospitalet	43	(14)
1994–1998	Alavés	97	(23)
1998–2000	Leganés	43	(3)
2000–2006	Gimnàstic	189	(14)
2006–2010	Eibar	133	(8)
Total		505	(62)

Managerial career
- 2010–2013: Mirandés (assistant)
- * Club domestic league appearances and goals

Lluis Codina Codina (born 17 February 1973) is a Spanish former footballer who played as an attacking midfielder.

== Club career ==
Born in Taradell, Barcelona, Catalonia, Codina amassed Segunda División totals of 267 games and 21 goals over the course of ten seasons, representing in the competition Deportivo Alavés, CD Leganés, Gimnàstic de Tarragona and SD Eibar. He made his senior debut with CE L'Hospitalet in 1992, in his native region.

Having retired in June 2010 at the age of 37, Codina subsequently had a three-year coaching spell at CD Mirandés, assisting Carlos Pouso in two Segunda División B seasons and one in the second tier.
