= Besora Castle =

Catalonian castle

Coordinates: 42.027°N 1.598°E

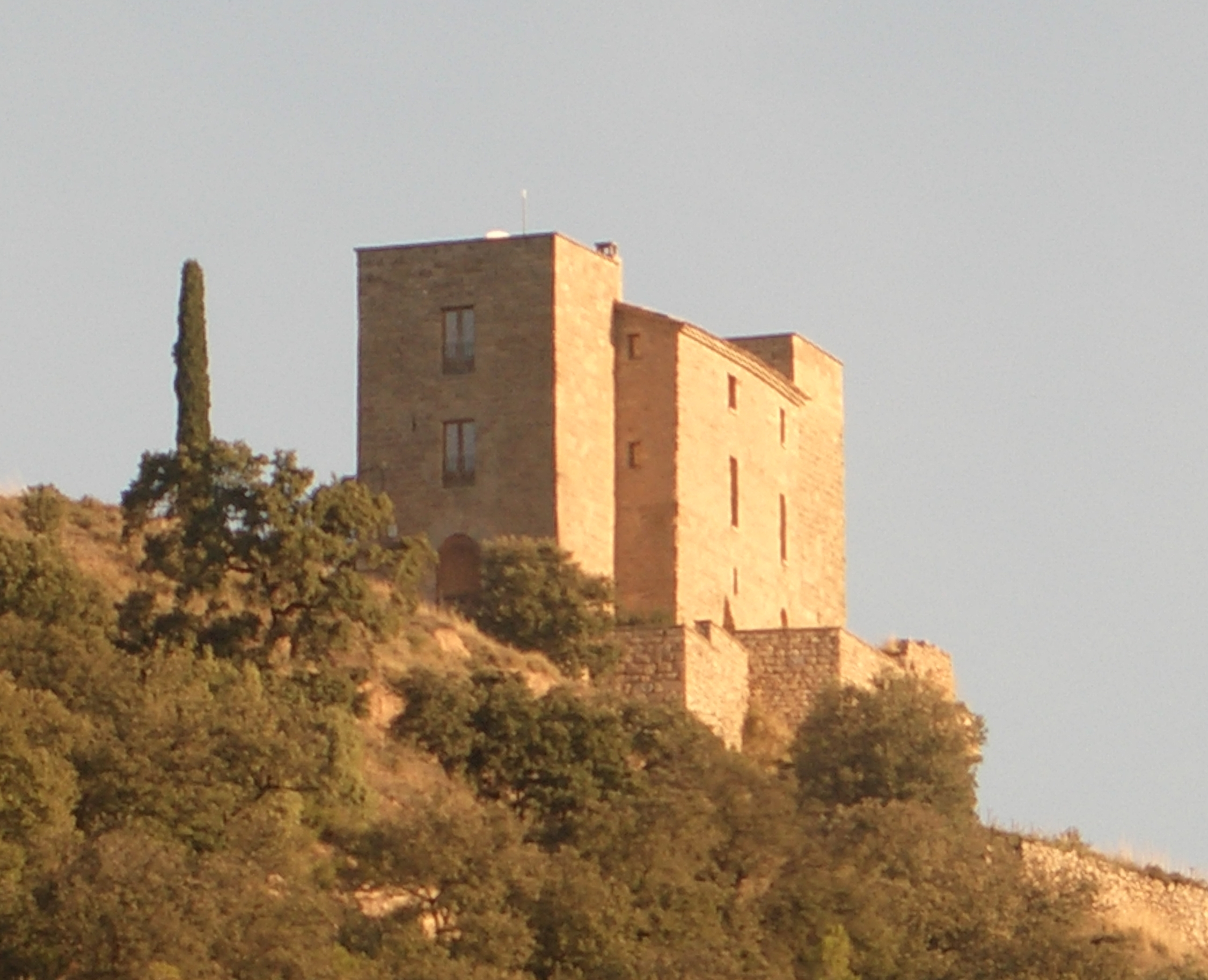
Besora Castle

Besora Castle is a castle located in the Vall de Lord, in the municipality of Santa Maria de Besora, between Navès and the Serra de Busa, in the comarca of Solsonès in the province of Lleida, Catalonia, Spain.

The castle is built above a rocky spur at an altitude of 1,092 m, and was accessible only by a path from the north, duly fortified. It is formed by three extended buildings, today converted into a rural dwelling in the local style, the masia.

== History ==
The earliest historical mention of the castle is in the year 982, according to some sources or in 885; in either case it appears already cited in 875 in the donation of the dowry of Emma, daughter of Wilfred the Hairy, count of Barcelona, as a gift when she entered the monastery in Sant Joan de les Abadesses.

During the Muslim period, it was one of the castles used to watch the frontier with the Christian territories.

At the end of the ninth century, Wilfred the Hairy established military positions in Cardona, Osona, Berguedà and in the Vall de Lord. Possibly the border of the county was then to the north of the city of Solsona, marked by the castle of Besora.

Parts of its walls are preserved, as a residential area. In addition, remains of the old parish church of Santa Maria de Besora, which was the parish church until the one in use now was built in 1759.

During the War of the Remences in the 15th century, the castle was occupied on various occasions by Francesc de Verntallat.

The castle suffered considerable damage, and was almost destroyed during the First Carlist War in 1838, when it served as a refuge and a battle site for a Carlist force. The royalist leader Buenaventura Carbó, who later served as governor of Cuba, was forced to flee the castle and the parish.
