= Les Masies de Roda =

- Municipality
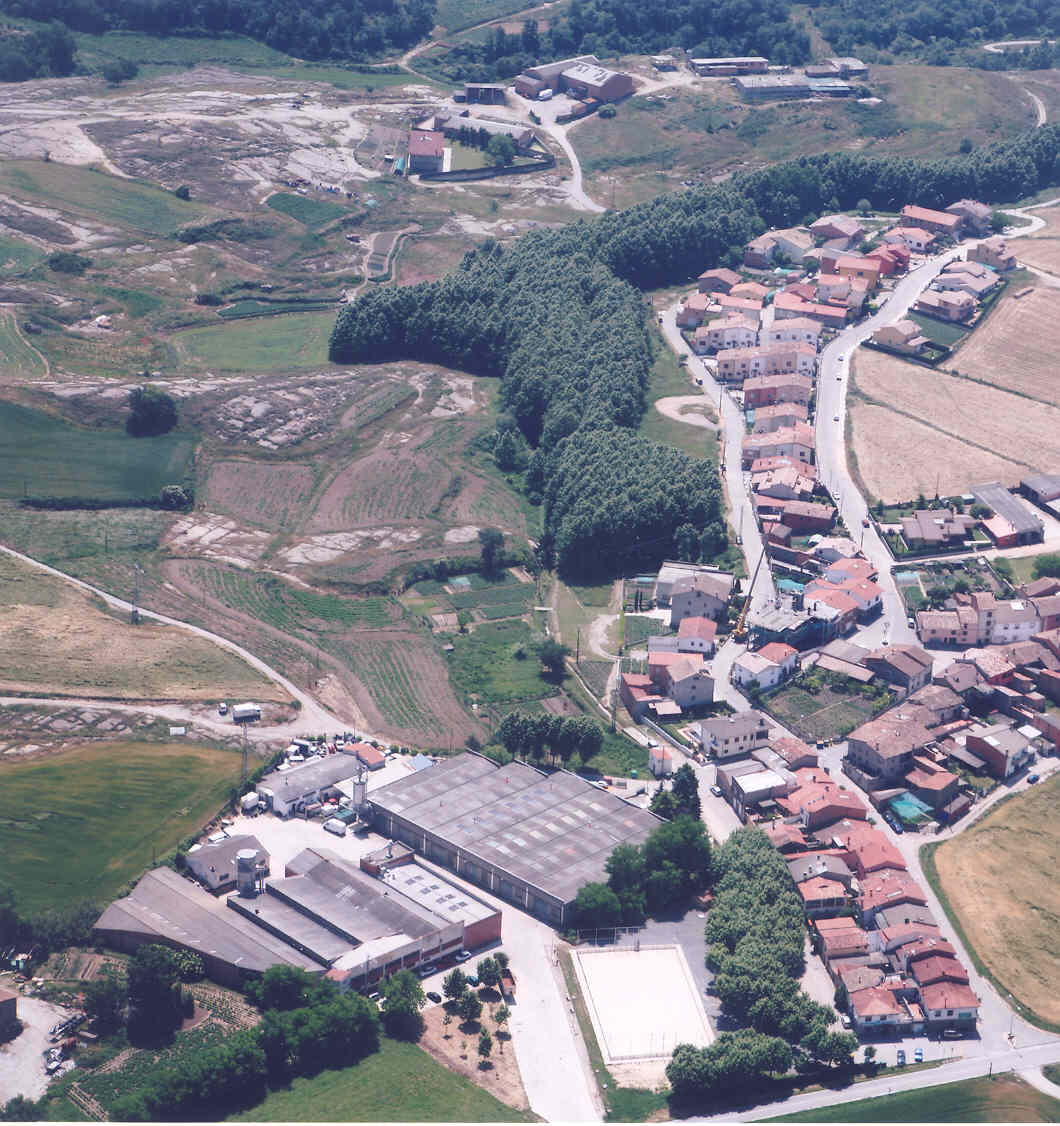
- Les Cases Noves

- Flag Coat of arms

- Location in Catalonia Les Masies de Roda (Spain)
- Coordinates: 41.990°N 2.306°E
- Country: Spain
- Community: Catalonia
- Province: Barcelona
- Comarca: Osona

Government
  - Mayor: Ramon Isern Serrabassa (2015)

Area
  - Total: 16.4 km^{2} (6.3 sq mi)

Population (2025-01-01)
  - Total: 758
  - Density: 46.2/km^{2} (120/sq mi)
- Website: lesmasiesderoda.cat

Les Masies de Roda (Catalan pronunciation: [ləz məˈziəz ðə ˈrɔðə]) is a municipality in the province of Barcelona, Catalonia, Spain. It is situated near the Ter River. It has an estimated population of 710, and an area of some 16.5 km^{2}.

In the late 20th century the former municipality of Sant Pere de Roda was split into two, creating Les Masies de Roda and Roda de Ter. Les Masies de Roda is the rural part of the old united municipality.
