= Sant Boi de Lluçanès =

- Municipality
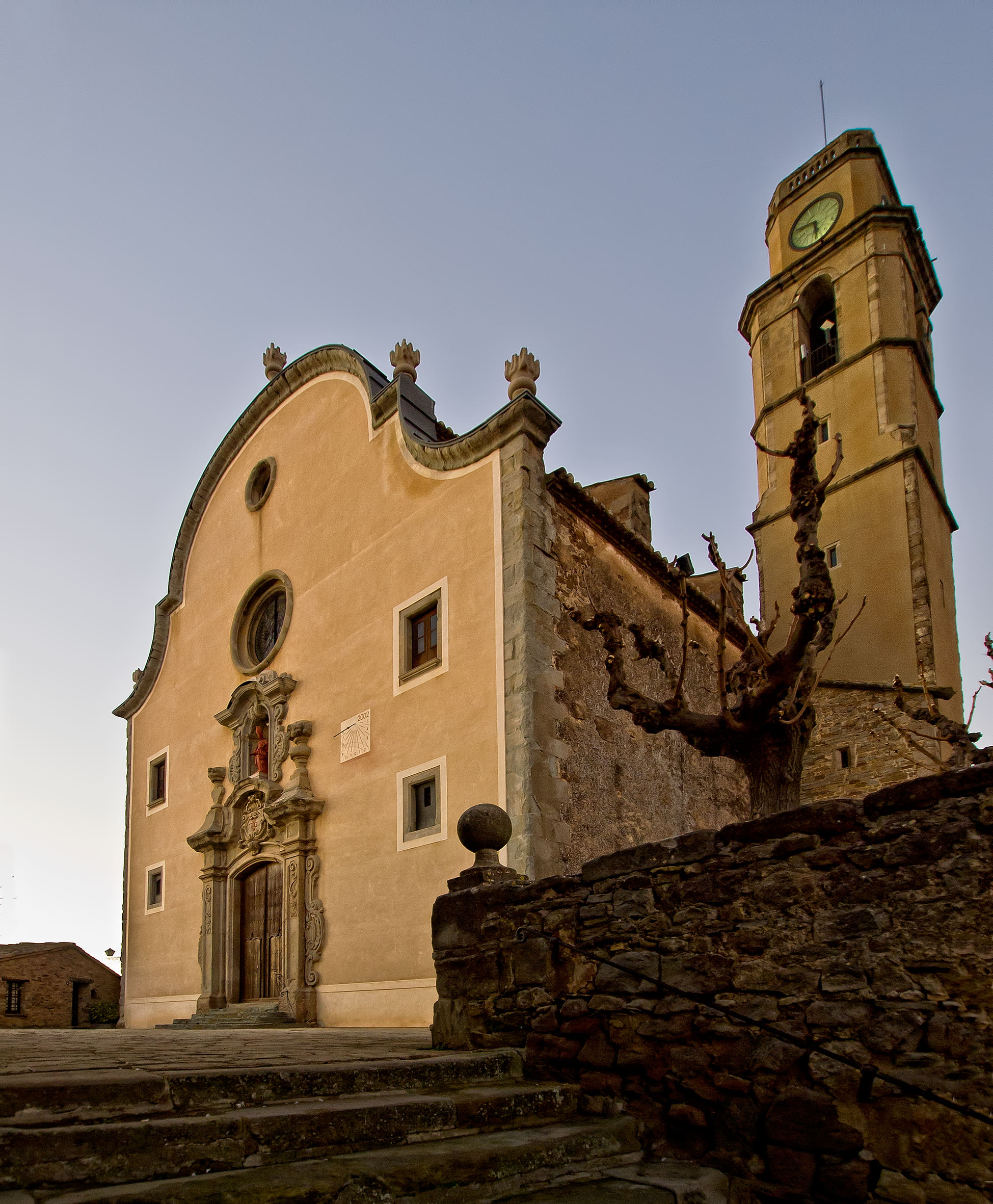
- Parish church

- Flag Coat of arms

- Location in Catalonia
- Coordinates: 42°3′55″N 2°9′9″E
- Country: Spain
- Community: Catalonia
- Province: Barcelona
- Comarca: Osona

Government
  - Mayor: Josep Maria Masramon Falgueras (2015)

Area
  - Total: 19.5 km^{2} (7.5 sq mi)

Population (2025-01-01)
  - Total: 602
  - Density: 30.9/km^{2} (80.0/sq mi)
- Website: www.santboidellucanes.cat

Sant Boi de Lluçanès (Catalan pronunciation: [ˈsam ˈboj ðə ʎusəˈnɛs]) is a municipality in the comarca of Osona in Catalonia, Spain.

Although the municipality lies within the natural region of Lluçanès, it voted in 2015 not to join a proposed new comarca of that name, but the plan was put on hold due to insufficient support.
