= Sora, Spain =

Village and municipality in Catalonia, Spain

Sora
- Municipality
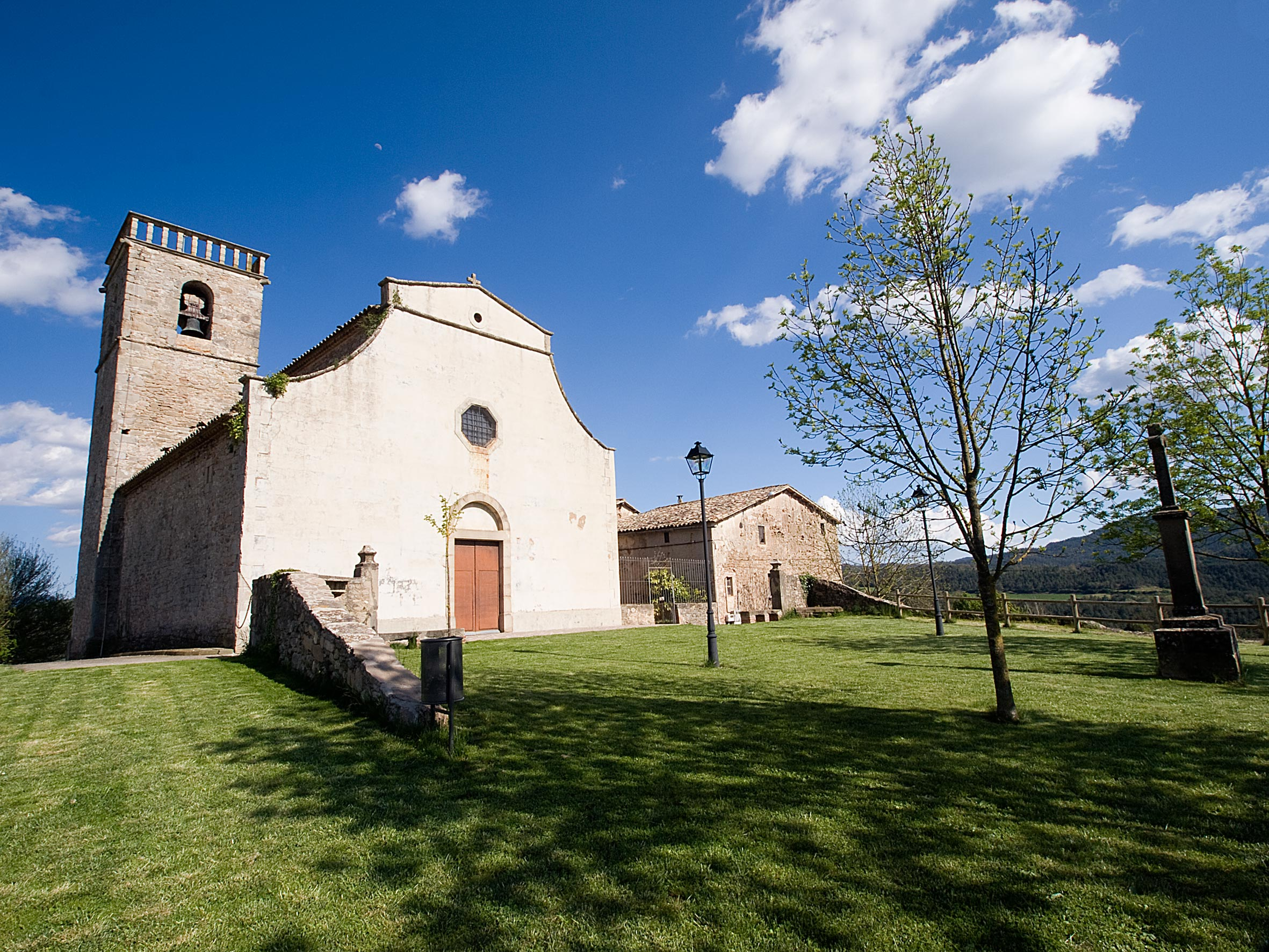
- St. Peter's church, Sora

- Flag Coat of arms

- Location in Catalonia
- Coordinates: 42°06′44″N 2°09′38″E
- Country: Spain
- Community: Catalonia
- Province: Barcelona
- Comarca: Osona

Government
  - Mayor: Janna Locher Casas (2015)

Area
  - Total: 31.7 km^{2} (12.2 sq mi)
- Elevation: 716 m (2,349 ft)

Population (2025-01-01)
  - Total: 225
  - Density: 7.10/km^{2} (18.4/sq mi)
- Postal code: 08272
- Website: www.sora.cat

Sora (Catalan pronunciation: [ˈsɔɾə]) is a small village and municipality in the comarca of Osona, Catalonia autonomous community, Spain.

== Population History ==
Year	Population
1991	211
1996	182
2001	181
2004	205
2013	173
