= Orís =

- Municipality
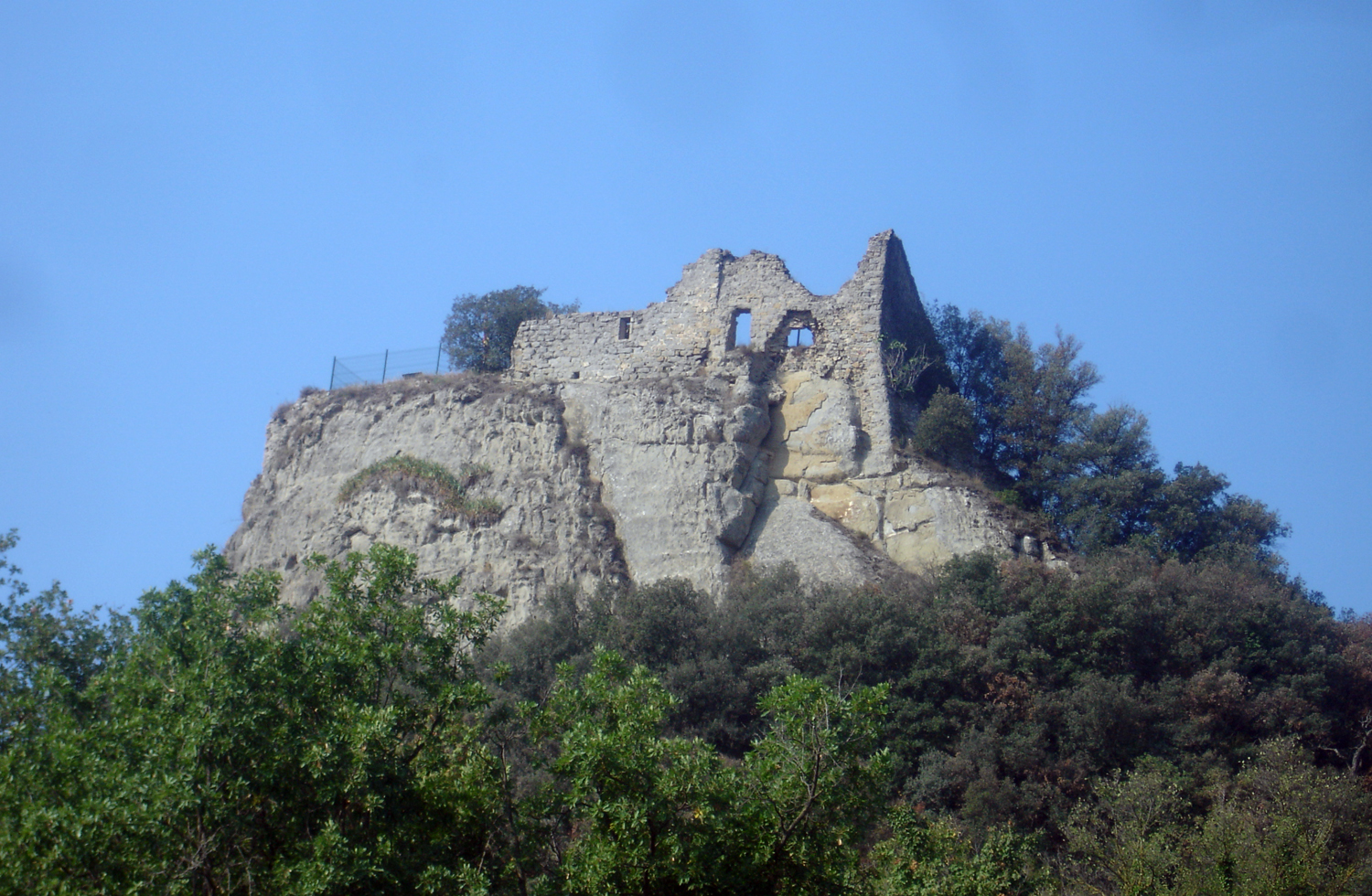
- Orís castle

- Flag Coat of arms

- Location in Catalonia
- Coordinates: 42°3′36″N 2°14′25″E
- Country: Spain
- Community: Catalonia
- Province: Barcelona
- Comarca: Osona

Government
  - Mayor: Arnau Basco Cirera (2015)

Area
  - Total: 27.2 km^{2} (10.5 sq mi)

Population (2025-01-01)
  - Total: 355
  - Density: 13.1/km^{2} (33.8/sq mi)
- Website: oris.cat

Orís (Catalan pronunciation: [uˈɾis]) is a municipality in the comarca of Osona in Catalonia, Spain.
