= Sant Sadurní d'Osormort =

- Municipality
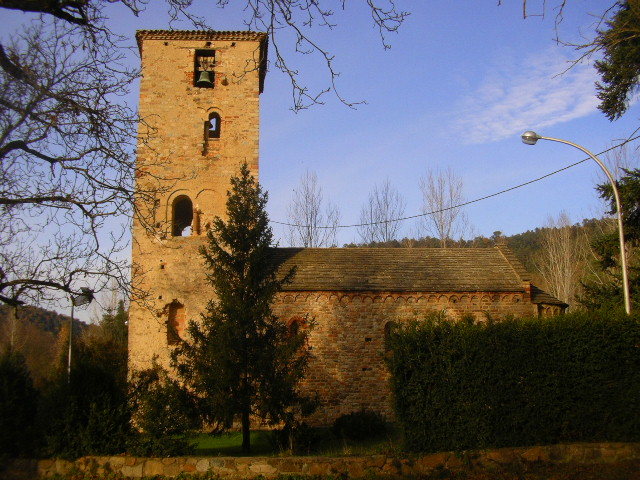
- Church of Sant Sadurní d'Osormort.

- Location in Catalonia
- Coordinates: 41°54′13″N 2°22′57″E
- Country: Spain
- Community: Catalonia
- Province: Barcelona
- Comarca: Osona

Government
  - Mayor: Enric Riera Santaeulària (2015)

Area
  - Total: 30.6 km^{2} (11.8 sq mi)

Population (2025-01-01)
  - Total: 89
  - Density: 2.9/km^{2} (7.5/sq mi)
- Website: santsadurnidosormort.cat

Sant Sadurní d'Osormort (Catalan pronunciation: [ˈsan səðuɾˈni ðuzu(ɾ)ˈmɔɾt]) is a municipality in the comarca of Osona in Catalonia.
