= Espinelves =

- Municipality
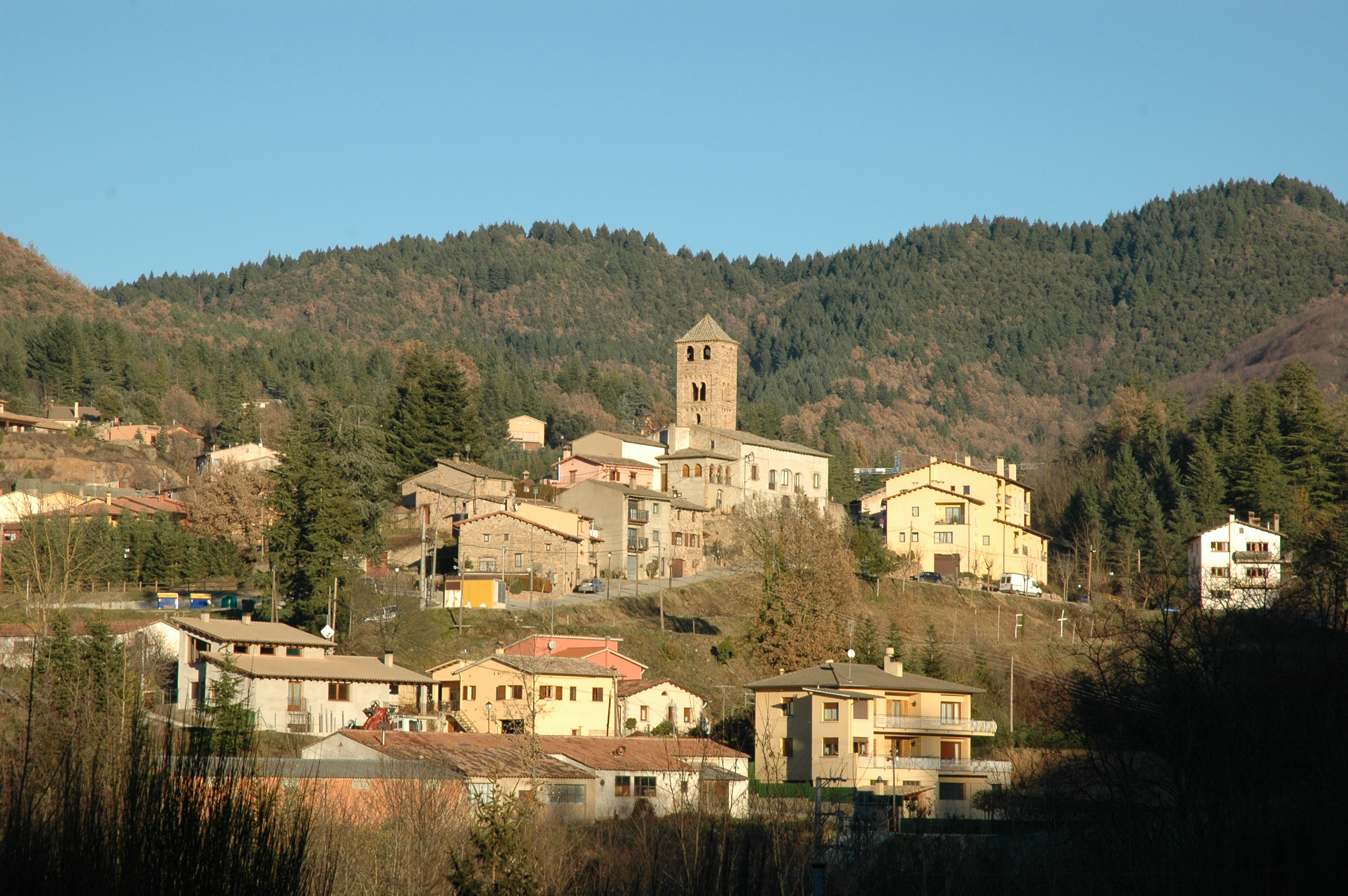

- Flag Coat of arms

- Location in Catalonia Espinelves (Spain)
- Coordinates: 41°52′16″N 2°25′5″E
- Country: Spain
- Community: Catalonia
- Province: Girona
- Comarca: Osona

Government
  - Mayor: Joan Manel Claveria Regales (2015)

Area
  - Total: 17.4 km^{2} (6.7 sq mi)
- Elevation: 752 m (2,467 ft)

Population (2025-01-01)
  - Total: 261
  - Density: 15.0/km^{2} (38.8/sq mi)
- Demonym(s): Espinelvenc, espinelvenca
- Website: www.espinelves.cat

Espinelves (Catalan pronunciation: [əspiˈnɛlβəs]) is a municipality in the comarca of Osona in Catalonia, Spain. It is situated in the Guilleries in the east of the comarca. Forestry is the main economic activity of the municipality, particularly the cultivation of the local species Abies masjoanensis for Christmas trees. The Romanesque church of Sant Vincenç d'Espinelves dates from the 11th and 12th centuries. The village is linked to Arbúcies and to Vic by the GI-543 road.

== Demography ==
1900	1930	1950	1970	1986	2007
421	481	445	296	240	183
