= Patronat d'Estudis Osonencs =

The Patronat d'Estudis Osonencs (Osona Local Studies Association) is a learned society founded in 1952. Its headquarters are in the Roman Temple in Vic, the chief city of the Catalan region of Osona. Its goal is to foster research into topics related to Osona and to heighten awareness of its cultural, artistic and architectural heritage. On the basis of its essentially local roots, it strives to reinforce interaction with similar associations throughout Catalonia and international contacts and exchanges.

It acts primarily by organizing cultural events, such as talks, exhibitions and discussions, and publishing research. A range of academic disciplines, including art, archeology, history, language and science, are represented on its Research Council.

Publishing is one of its key spheres of activity. Its official journal, AUSA, has appeared without interruption since 1952. It has also published some sixty books, most of which are part of collections (Monografies, Osona a la butxaca, Documents and Catàlegs - the last two in cooperation with other bodies).

The association owns the Roman Temple and two other emblematic sites associated with Jacint Verdaguer, Catalonia's foremost 19th-century poet, who was born in Osona.
