= Seva, Spain =

Seva
- Municipality
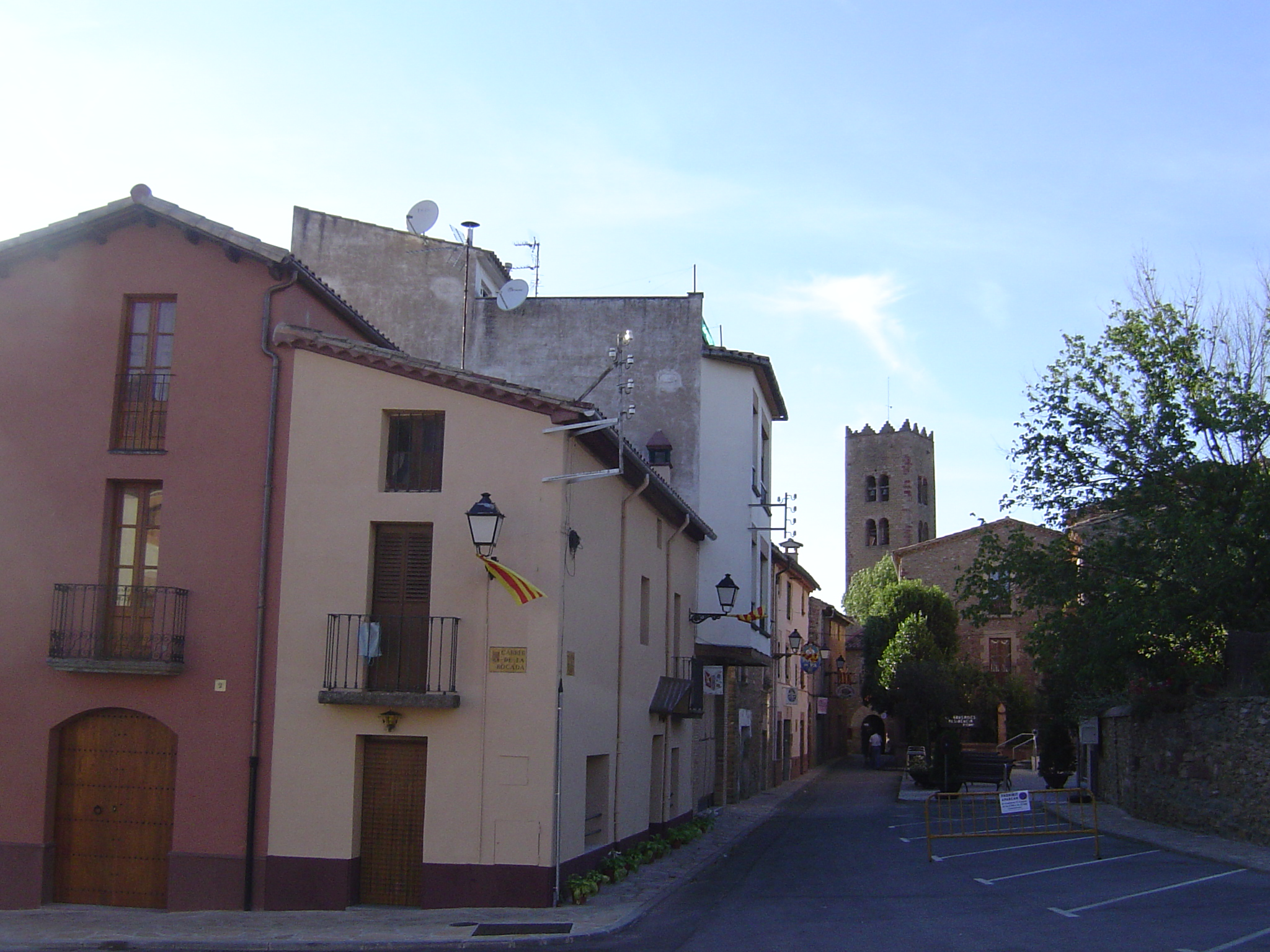
- Entrance to old village of Seva., with St. Mary's church behind

- Flag Coat of arms

- Location in Catalonia Seva (Spain)
- Coordinates: 41°50′26″N 2°17′7″E
- Country: Spain
- Community: Catalonia
- Province: Barcelona
- Comarca: Osona

Government
  - Mayor: Xavier Rierola Rovira (2015)

Area
  - Total: 30.4 km^{2} (11.7 sq mi)

Population (2025-01-01)
  - Total: 3,808
  - Density: 125/km^{2} (324/sq mi)
- Website: seva.cat

Seva (Catalan pronunciation: [ˈsɛβə]) is a municipality in the comarca of Osona in Catalonia, Spain. The municipality includes a large exclave to the south-west.
