= Sant Bartomeu del Grau =

- Municipality
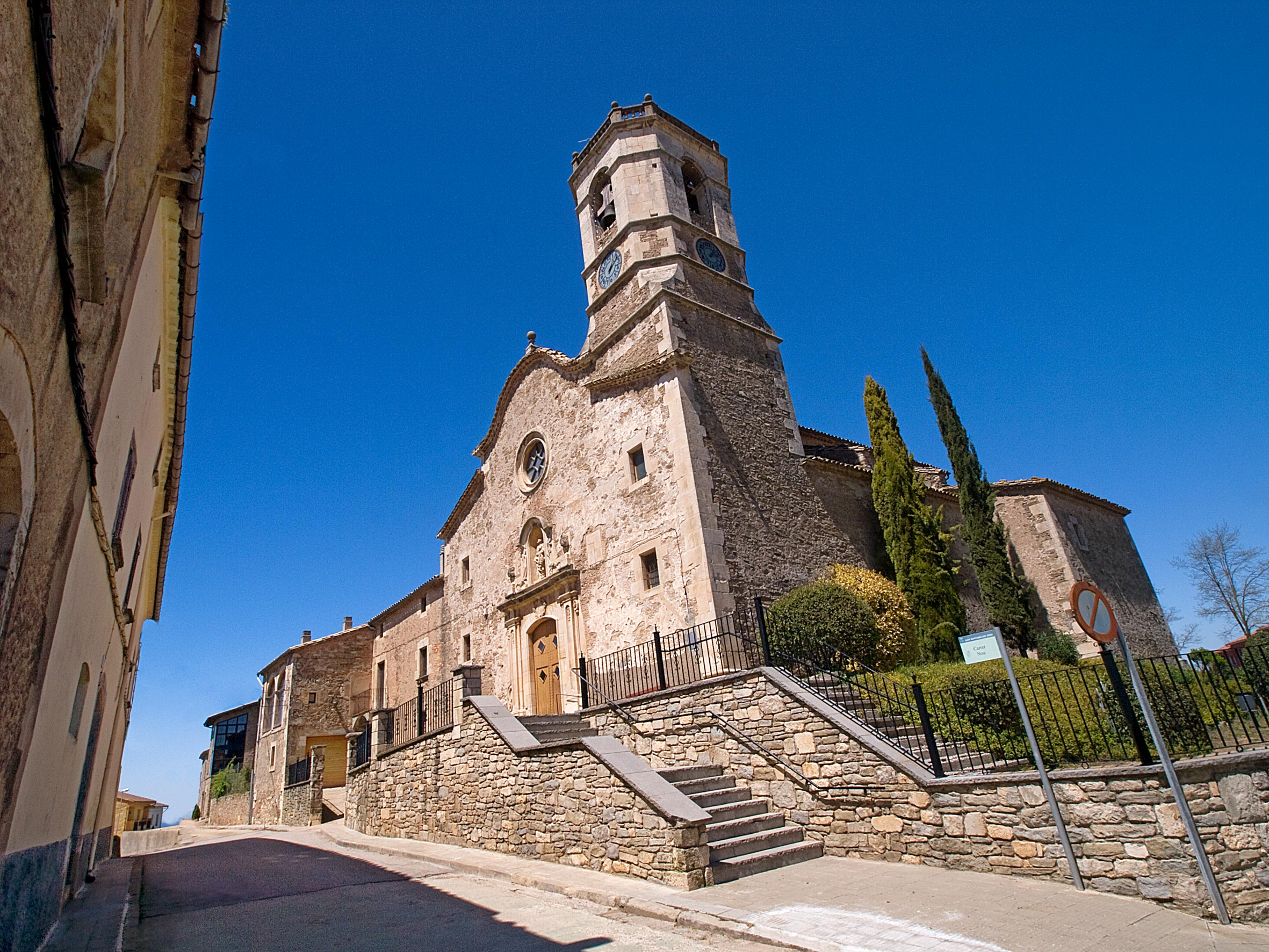
- Parish church

- Coat of arms

- Location in the Province of Barcelona Location in Catalonia Location in Spain
- Coordinates: 41°59′8″N 2°10′19″E
- Country: Spain
- Community: Catalonia
- Province: Barcelona
- Comarca: Osona

Government
  - Mayor: Emili Benito Sayol (2015)

Area
  - Total: 34.4 km^{2} (13.3 sq mi)

Population (2025-01-01)
  - Total: 933
  - Density: 27.1/km^{2} (70.2/sq mi)
- Website: sbg.cat

Sant Bartomeu del Grau (Catalan pronunciation: [ˈsam bəɾtuˈmew ðəl ˈɣɾaw]) is a municipality in the comarca of Osona in Catalonia, Spain.

Although the municipality lies within the natural region of Lluçanès, it voted in 2015 not to join a proposed new comarca of that name, but the plan was put on hold due to insufficient support.
