= Santa Eugènia de Berga =

- Municipality
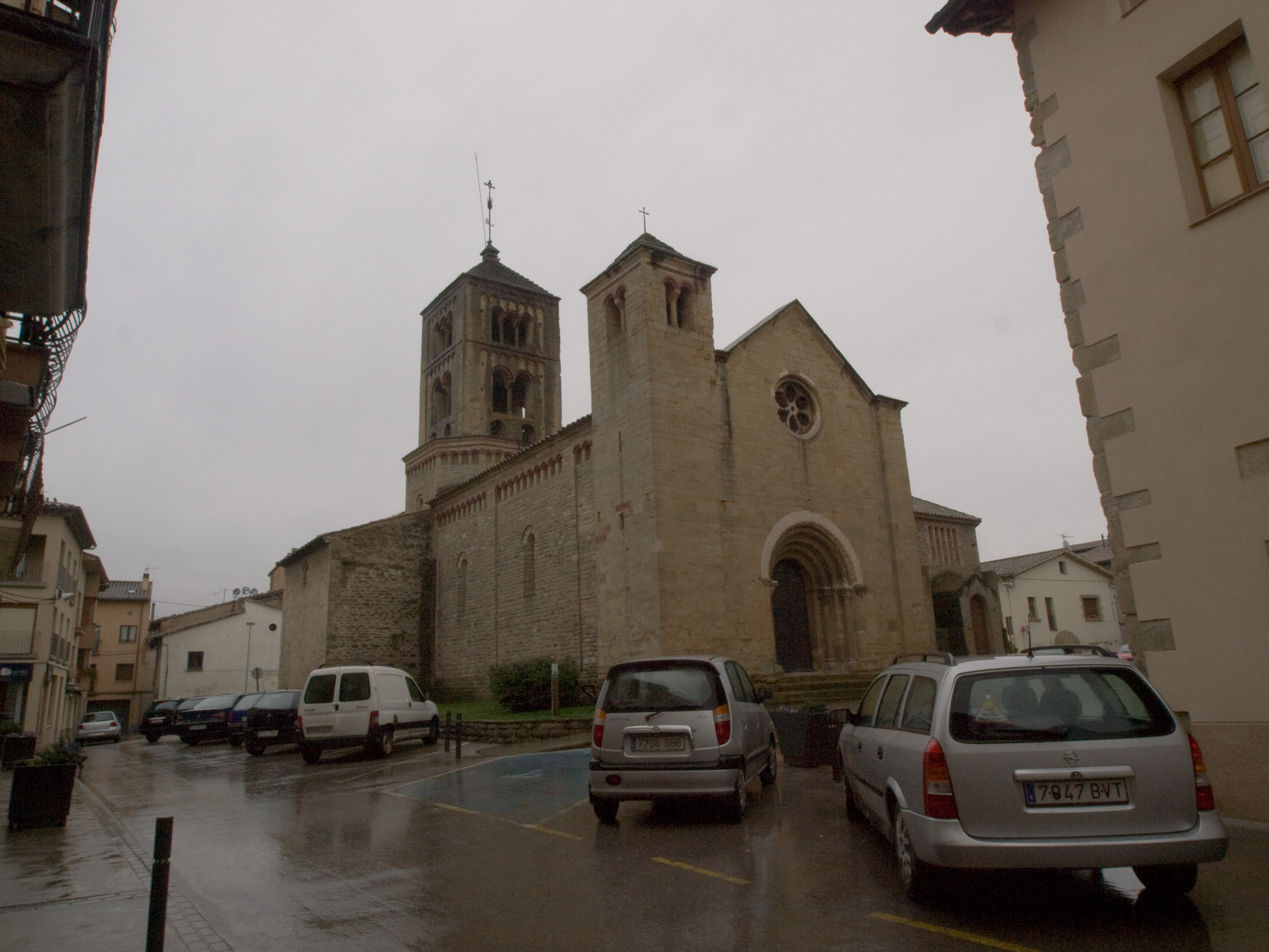
- Church of Santa Eugènia de Berga

- Coat of arms

- Location in Catalonia
- Coordinates: 41°54′8″N 2°17′3″E
- Country: Spain
- Community: Catalonia
- Province: Barcelona
- Comarca: Osona

Government
  - Mayor: Anna Franquesa Roca (2015)

Area
  - Total: 7.0 km^{2} (2.7 sq mi)

Population (2025-01-01)
  - Total: 2,348
  - Density: 340/km^{2} (870/sq mi)
- Website: santaeugeniadeberga.cat

Santa Eugènia de Berga (Catalan pronunciation: [ˌsantəwˈʒɛniə ðə ˈβeɾɣə]) is a municipality in the comarca of Osona in Catalonia, Spain.
