= Vidrà =

- Municipality
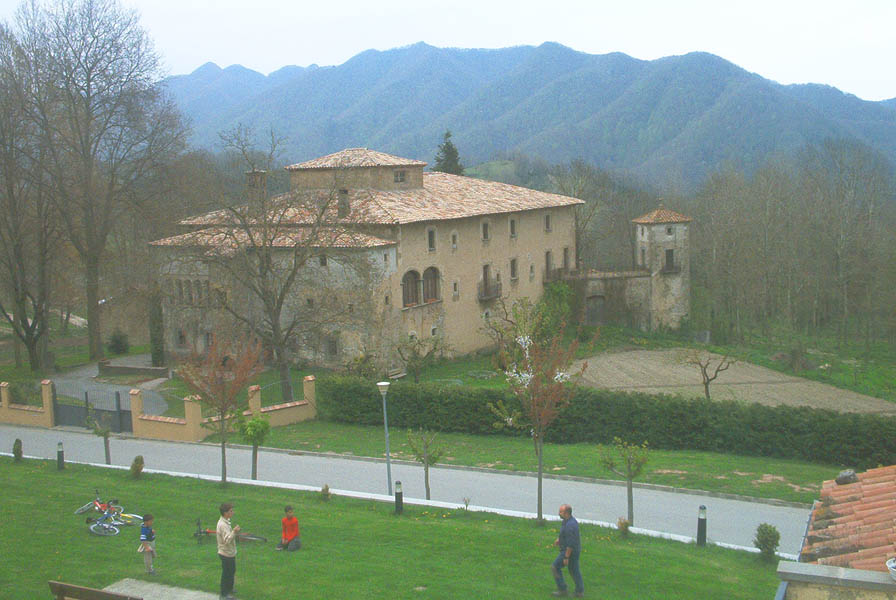

- Flag Coat of arms

- Location in Catalonia Vidrà (Spain)
- Coordinates: 42°07′N 2°19′E
- Country: Spain
- Community: Catalonia
- Province: Girona
- Comarca: Osona

Government
  - Mayor: Josep Anglada Dorca (2015)

Area
  - Total: 34.4 km^{2} (13.3 sq mi)
- Elevation: 982 m (3,222 ft)

Population (2025-01-01)
  - Total: 167
  - Density: 4.85/km^{2} (12.6/sq mi)
- Demonym(s): Vidranès, vidranesa
- Website: www.vidra.cat

Vidrà (Catalan pronunciation: [biˈðɾa]) is a municipality in the comarca of Osona in Catalonia, Spain. It is situated in the valley of the Ges river, between the Bellmunt and Milany ranges, in the north of the comarca. It is linked to Sant Quirze de Besora by a local road. There are the roman churches of Sant Bartomeu de Covildases and of Santa Margarida de Cabagès in the municipal territory. Vidrà became part of Osona in the comarcal revision of 1990: previously it formed part of the Ripollès.

== Demography ==
1900	1930	1950	1970	1986	2007
482	444	382	229	178	179
