= Tavèrnoles =

- Municipality
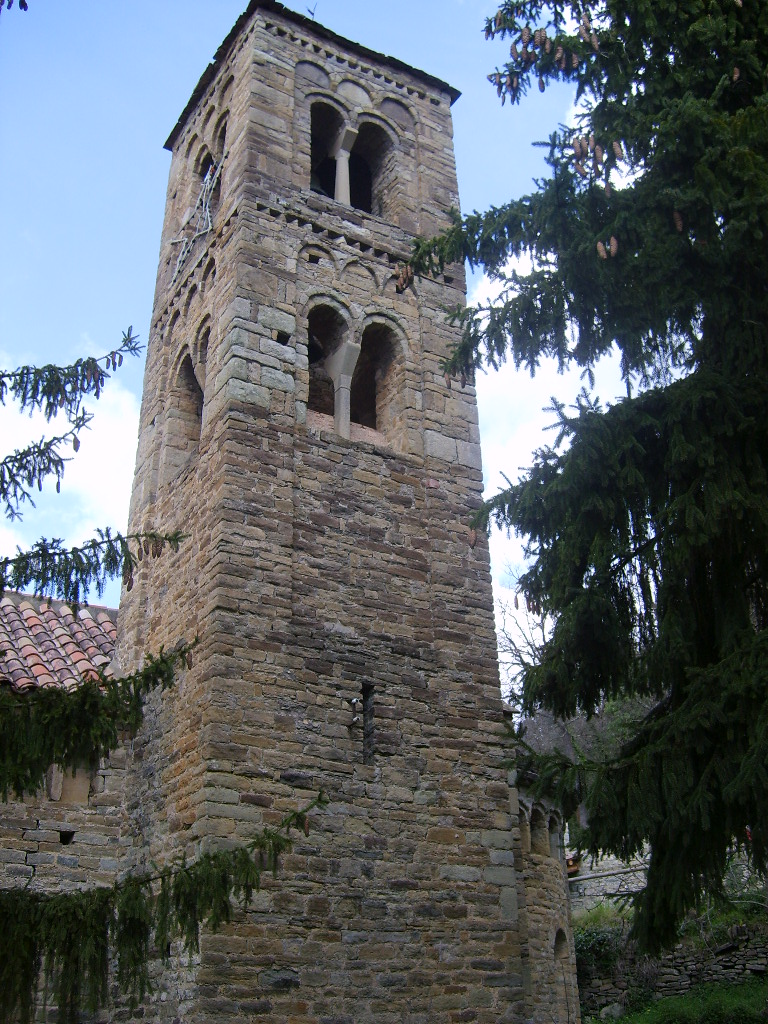
- St. Stephen's church, Tavèrnoles

- Flag Coat of arms

- Location in Catalonia
- Coordinates: 41°57′13″N 2°19′40″E
- Country: Spain
- Community: Catalonia
- Province: Barcelona
- Comarca: Osona

Government
  - Mayor: Carles Banús Puigivila (2015)

Area
  - Total: 18.8 km^{2} (7.3 sq mi)

Population (2025-01-01)
  - Total: 354
  - Density: 18.8/km^{2} (48.8/sq mi)
- Website: www.tavernoles.cat

Tavèrnoles (Catalan pronunciation: [təˈβɛɾnuləs]) is a municipality in the comarca of Osona in Catalonia, Spain. An altar frontal from Tavèrnoles is conserved at the National Art Museum of Catalonia, in Barcelona.
