= El Brull =

- Municipality
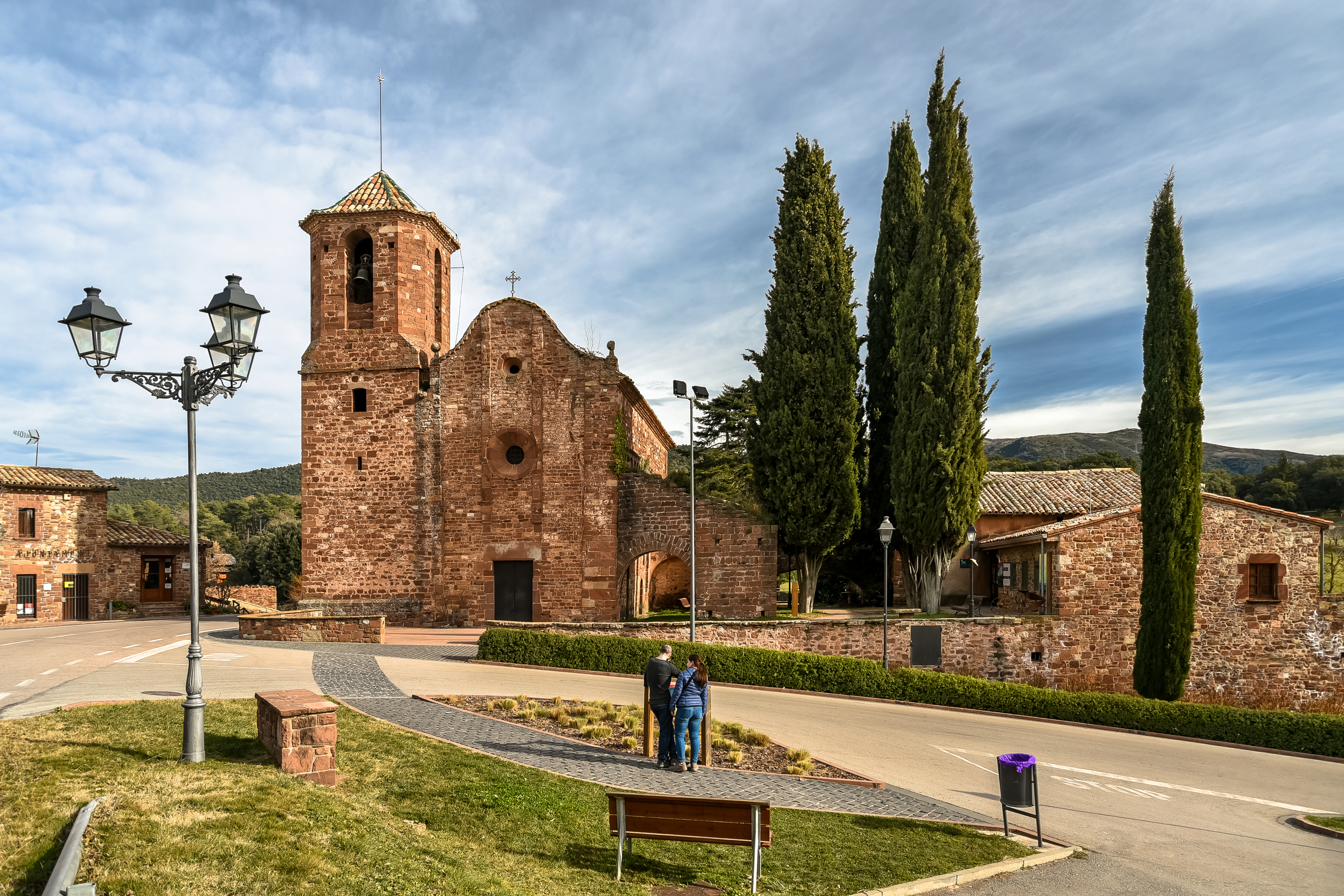
- St. Martin's church, el Brull

- Flag Coat of arms

- Location in Catalonia
- Coordinates: 41°49′7″N 2°18′25″E
- Country: Spain
- Community: Catalonia
- Province: Barcelona
- Comarca: Osona

Government
  - Mayor: Ferran Teixidó Turner (2015)

Area
  - Total: 41.0 km^{2} (15.8 sq mi)

Population (2025-01-01)
  - Total: 296
  - Density: 7.22/km^{2} (18.7/sq mi)
- Website: www.elbrull.cat

El Brull (Catalan pronunciation: [əl ˈβɾuʎ]) is a municipality in the comarca of Osona in Catalonia, Spain.
