= Gurb =

- Municipality
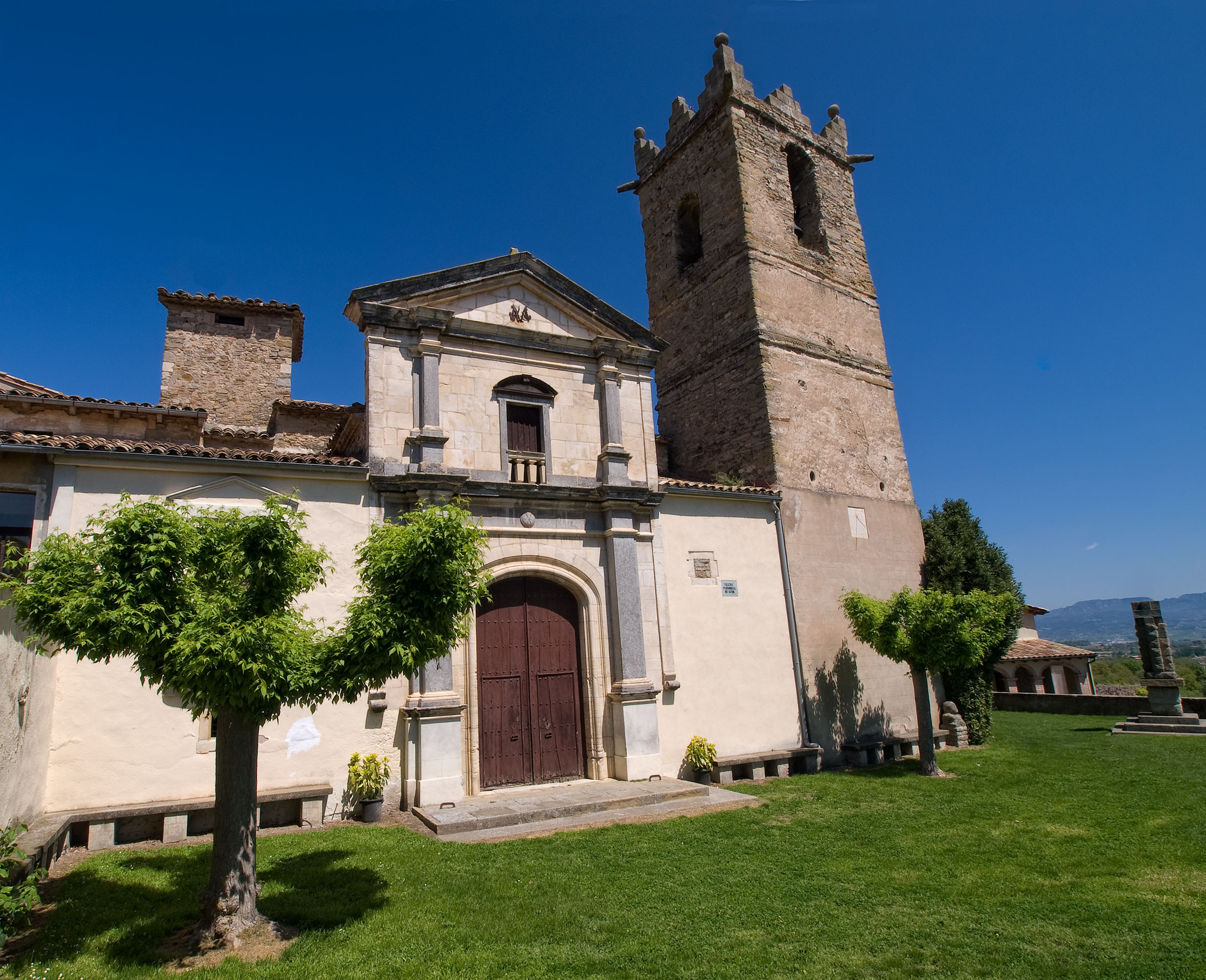
- St. Andrew's church, Gurb

- Flag Coat of arms

- Location in Catalonia Gurb (Spain)
- Coordinates: 41.941°N 2.243°E
- Country: Spain
- Community: Catalonia
- Province: Barcelona
- Comarca: Osona

Government
  - Mayor: Josep Casassas Jordà (2019)

Area
  - Total: 51.6 km^{2} (19.9 sq mi)

Population (2025-01-01)
  - Total: 2,741
  - Density: 53.1/km^{2} (138/sq mi)
- Website: www.gurb.cat

Gurb (Catalan pronunciation: [ˈɡuɾp]) is a municipality in the comarca of Osona in Catalonia, Spain.
