= Roda de Ter =

- Municipality
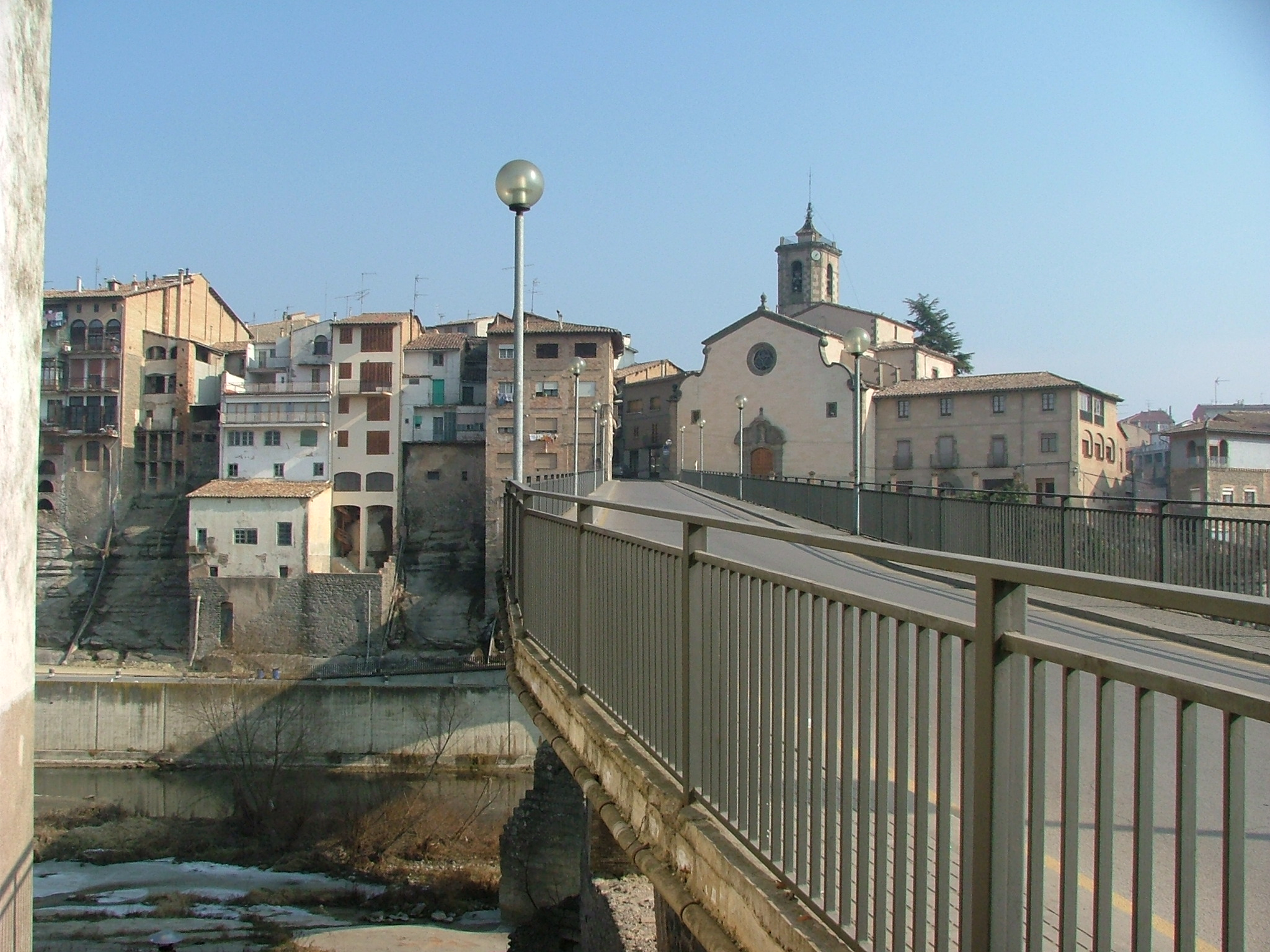
- St. Peter's church above the old bridge

- Flag Coat of arms

- Location in Catalonia Roda de Ter (Spain)
- Coordinates: 41°59′2″N 2°18′38″E
- Country: Spain
- Community: Catalonia
- Province: Barcelona
- Comarca: Osona

Government
  - Mayor: Roger Corominas Berloso (2020)

Area
  - Total: 2.2 km^{2} (0.85 sq mi)

Population (2025-01-01)
  - Total: 6,937
  - Density: 3,200/km^{2} (8,200/sq mi)
- Website: rodadeter.cat

Roda de Ter (Catalan pronunciation: [ˈrɔðə ðə ˈtɛɾ]) is a municipality in the comarca of Osona, province of Barcelona, Catalonia, Spain, near Vic, on the Ter River above the Sau Reservoir. Population: 5,435 (2004), area: 2.18 km^{2}. Its church is dedicated to St. Peter. Main monuments: Pont Vell ("Old Bridge") and the Capella del Sòl del Pont (Chapel of the floor of the Bridge). The Virgin Mary, La Mare de Déu del Sòl del Pont is the patron of the village.

On the site of an Iberian town a Roman villa was established. In its later fortified state it existed until 826, when was destroyed by Aissó, in revolt against the Frankish count Bernat of Septimania. Many years passed before it was repopulated and grew slowly. The fierce independence of the mountain people of northern Catalonia manifested itself in banditry in which villagers were encouraged to participate, even by their silence, by a share in the takings. The bandit leaders might be peasants or local noblemen. On one occasion in 1646, the whole of the village of Roda de Ter was briefly incarcerated as fautors ("abettors") for their part in sheltering members of a local gang.

The Catalan fighters against the French forces of the Bourbon Philip V of Spain are an easily overlooked local part of the European War of the Spanish Succession, but Roda was a hotbed of partisans for the unsuccessful Habsburg claimant. One of them, Francesc Macià i Ambert (died 1713), who came from Roda de Ter, is memorialized in Barcelona by a street and a metro station that bear his nom de guerre Bac de Roda.

Before the municipality was simply called Roda; it took the name of Roda de Ter in late 20th century when the municipality was split into Roda de Ter (the town) and Masies de Roda (the rural zone). Roda de Ter lies on Catalan route C-153.

The foundry Fundiciones de Roda produced fine cast iron components for hydraulics.

The Catalan poet Miquel Martí i Pol was born in Roda de Ter, March 19, 1929. Children's author Miquel Obiols is also from Roda.
