= Sant Vicenç de Torelló =

- Municipality
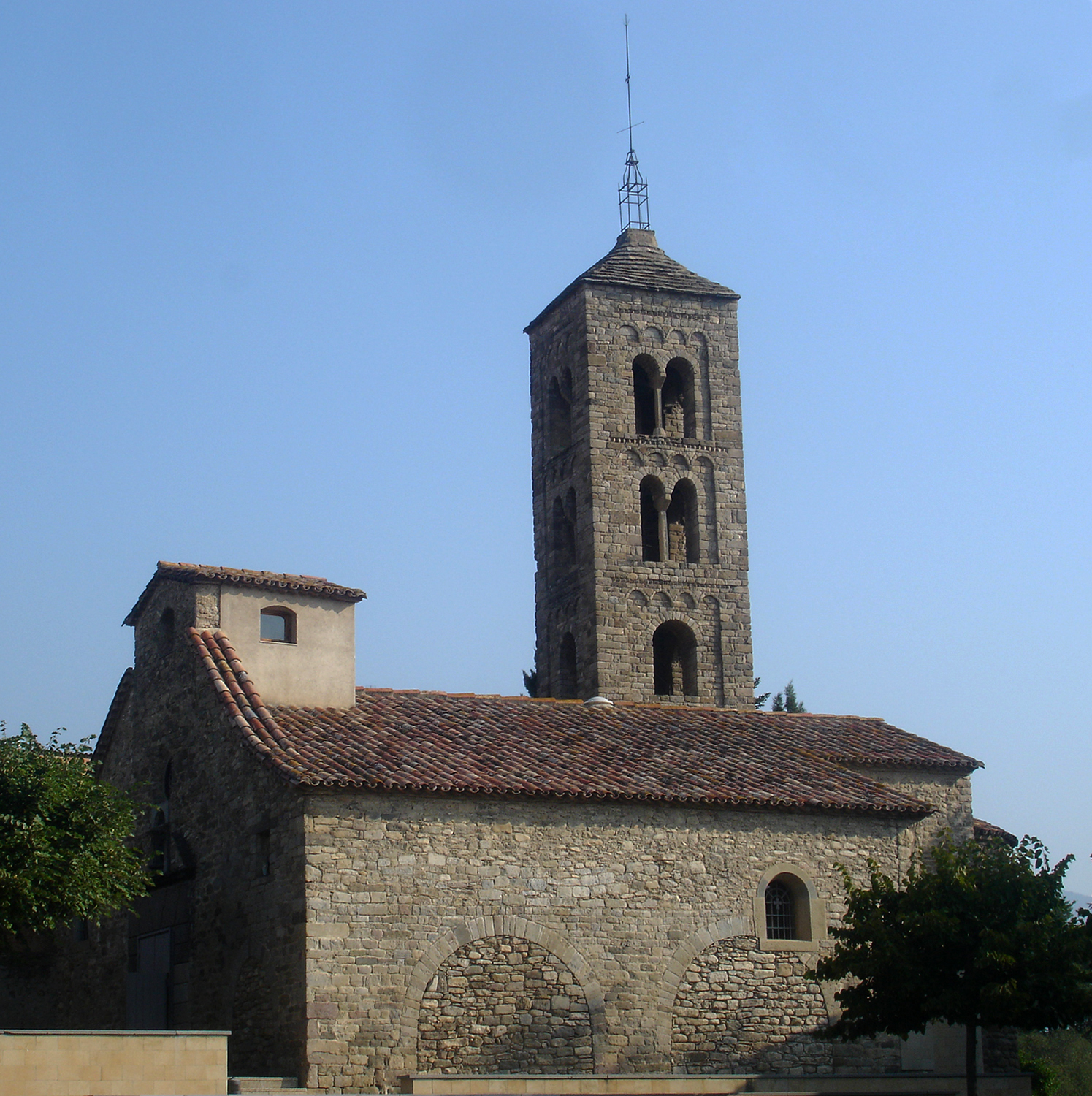
- Church of Sant Vicenç de Torelló

- Coat of arms

- Location in Catalonia
- Coordinates: 42°3′44″N 2°16′22″E
- Country: Spain
- Community: Catalonia
- Province: Barcelona
- Comarca: Osona

Government
  - Mayor: Eric Sibina Márquez (2015)

Area
  - Total: 6.6 km^{2} (2.5 sq mi)

Population (2025-01-01)
  - Total: 2,117
  - Density: 320/km^{2} (830/sq mi)
- Website: santvicens.org

Sant Vicenç de Torelló (Catalan pronunciation: [ˈsam biˈsɛnz ðə tuɾəˈʎo], locally [- tuɾəˈjo]) is a municipality in the comarca of Osona in Catalonia, Spain.

== Sources ==
- Panareda Clopés, Josep Maria; Rios Calvet, Jaume; Rabella Vives, Josep Maria (1989). Guia de Catalunya, Barcelona: Caixa de Catalunya. ISBN 84-87135-01-3 (Spanish). ISBN 84-87135-02-1 (Catalan).
