= Santa Cecília de Voltregà =

- Municipality
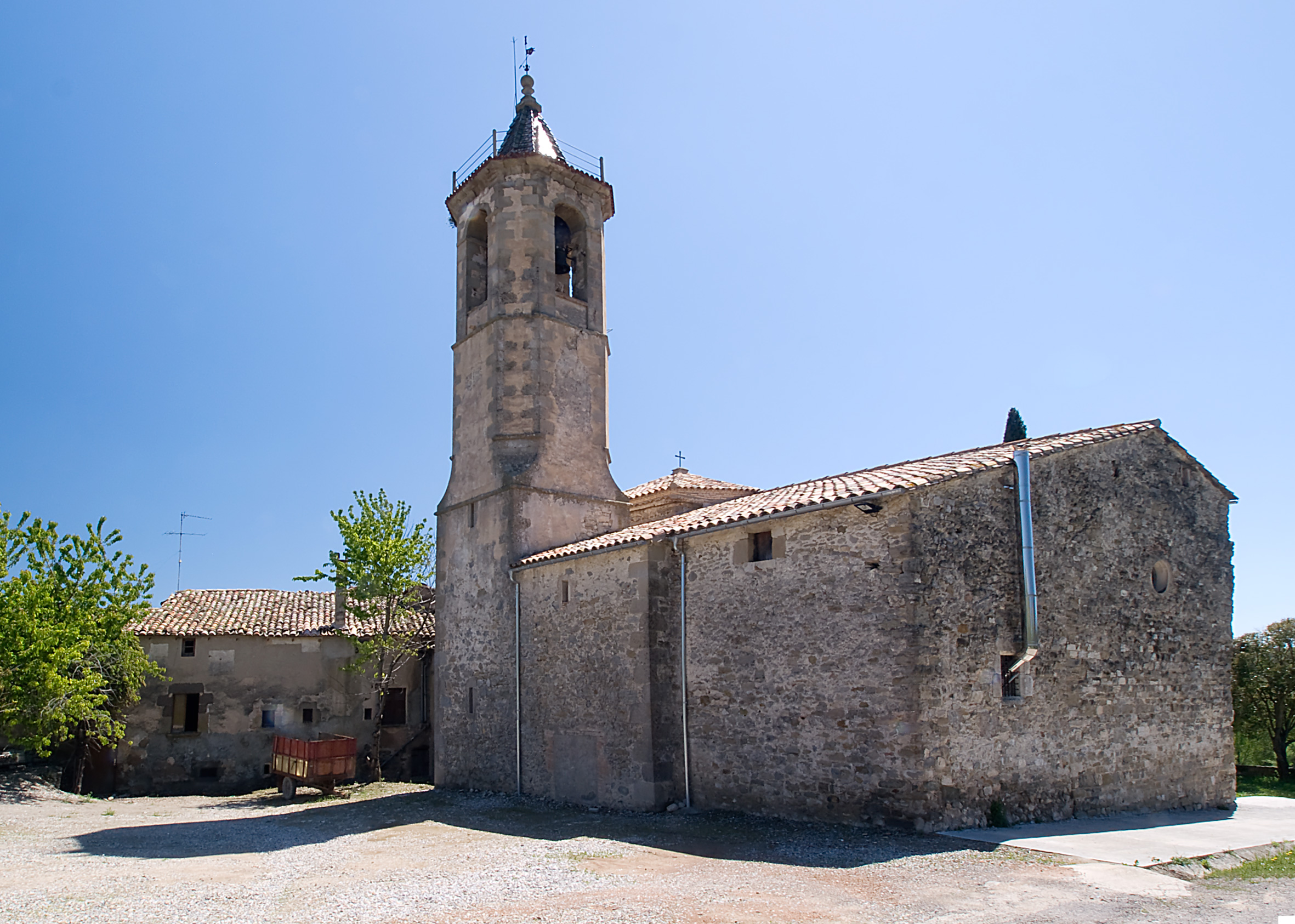

- Location in Catalonia
- Coordinates: 41°59′41″N 2°13′24″E
- Country: Spain
- Community: Catalonia
- Province: Barcelona
- Comarca: Osona

Government
  - Mayor: Joan Senmartí Escarrà (2015)

Area
  - Total: 8.6 km^{2} (3.3 sq mi)

Population (2025-01-01)
  - Total: 197
  - Density: 23/km^{2} (59/sq mi)
- Website: www.santacecilia.cat

Santa Cecília de Voltregà (Catalan pronunciation: [ˈsantə səˈsiliə ðə βultɾəˈɣa]) is a municipality in the comarca of Osona, Catalonia, Spain.
