= Sant Martí de Centelles =

- Municipality
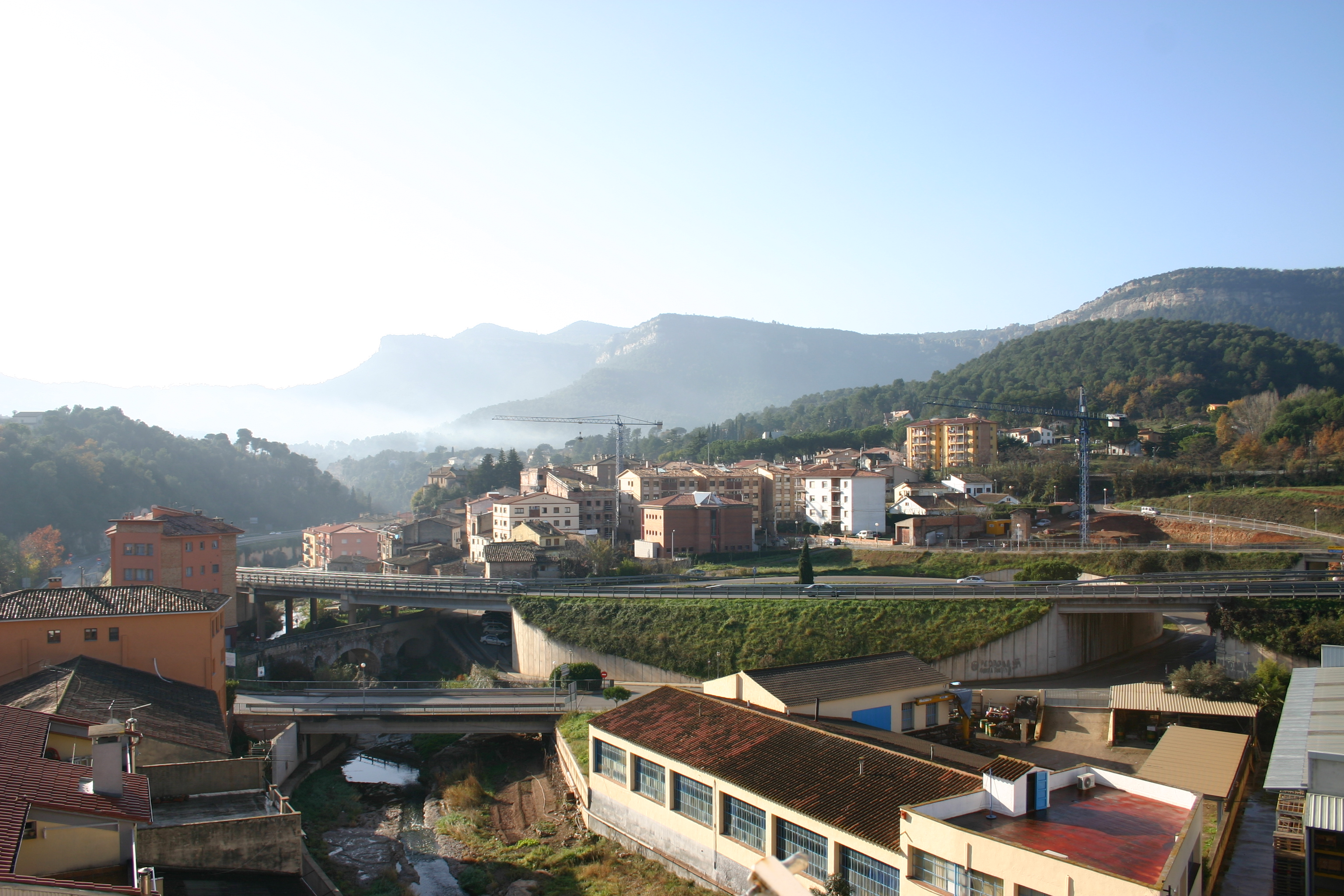

- Flag Coat of arms

- Location in Catalonia
- Coordinates: 41°45′55″N 2°15′6″E
- Country: Spain
- Community: Catalonia
- Province: Barcelona
- Comarca: Osona

Government
  - Mayor: Josep Antoni Grau Aregall (2015)

Area
  - Total: 25.6 km^{2} (9.9 sq mi)

Population (2025-01-01)
  - Total: 1,263
  - Density: 49.3/km^{2} (128/sq mi)
- Website: smarticentelles.org

Sant Martí de Centelles (Catalan pronunciation: [ˈsam məɾˈti ðə sənˈtɛʎəs]; locally [- sənˈtɛjəs]) is a municipality in the comarca of Osona in Catalonia, Spain.
