= Malla, Spain =

Malla
- Municipality
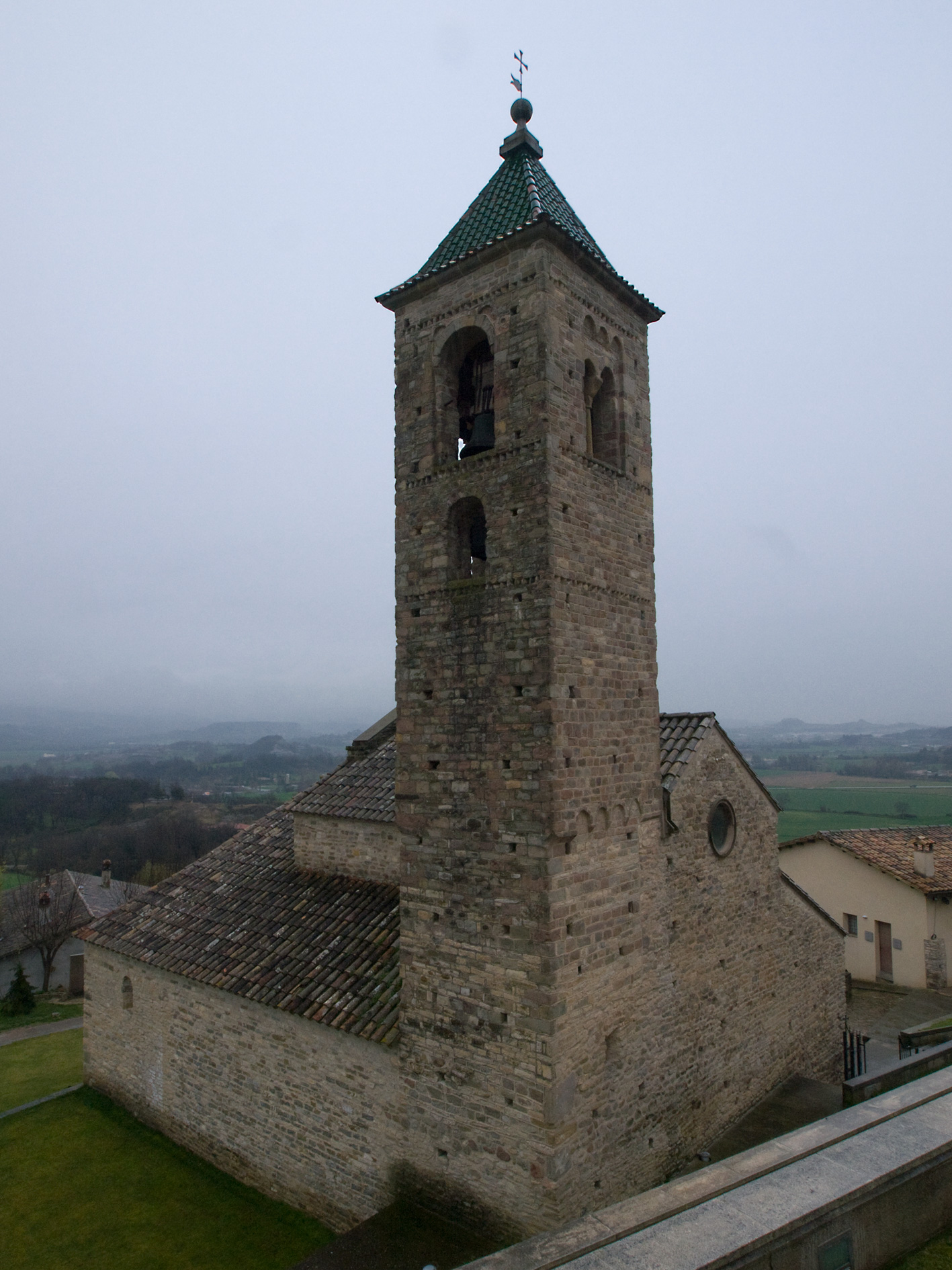
- St. Vincent's church, Malla

- Flag Coat of arms

- Location in Catalonia
- Coordinates: 41°53′20″N 2°14′9″E
- Country: Spain
- Community: Catalonia
- Province: Barcelona
- Comarca: Osona

Government
  - Mayor: Eudald Sentmartí Castañé (2015)

Area
  - Total: 11.0 km^{2} (4.2 sq mi)

Population (2025-01-01)
  - Total: 285
  - Density: 25.9/km^{2} (67.1/sq mi)
- Website: malla-osona.cat

Malla (Catalan pronunciation: [ˈmaʎə]) is a municipality in the comarca of Osona in Catalonia, Spain. It includes an exclave to the south.
