= Balenyà =

- Municipality
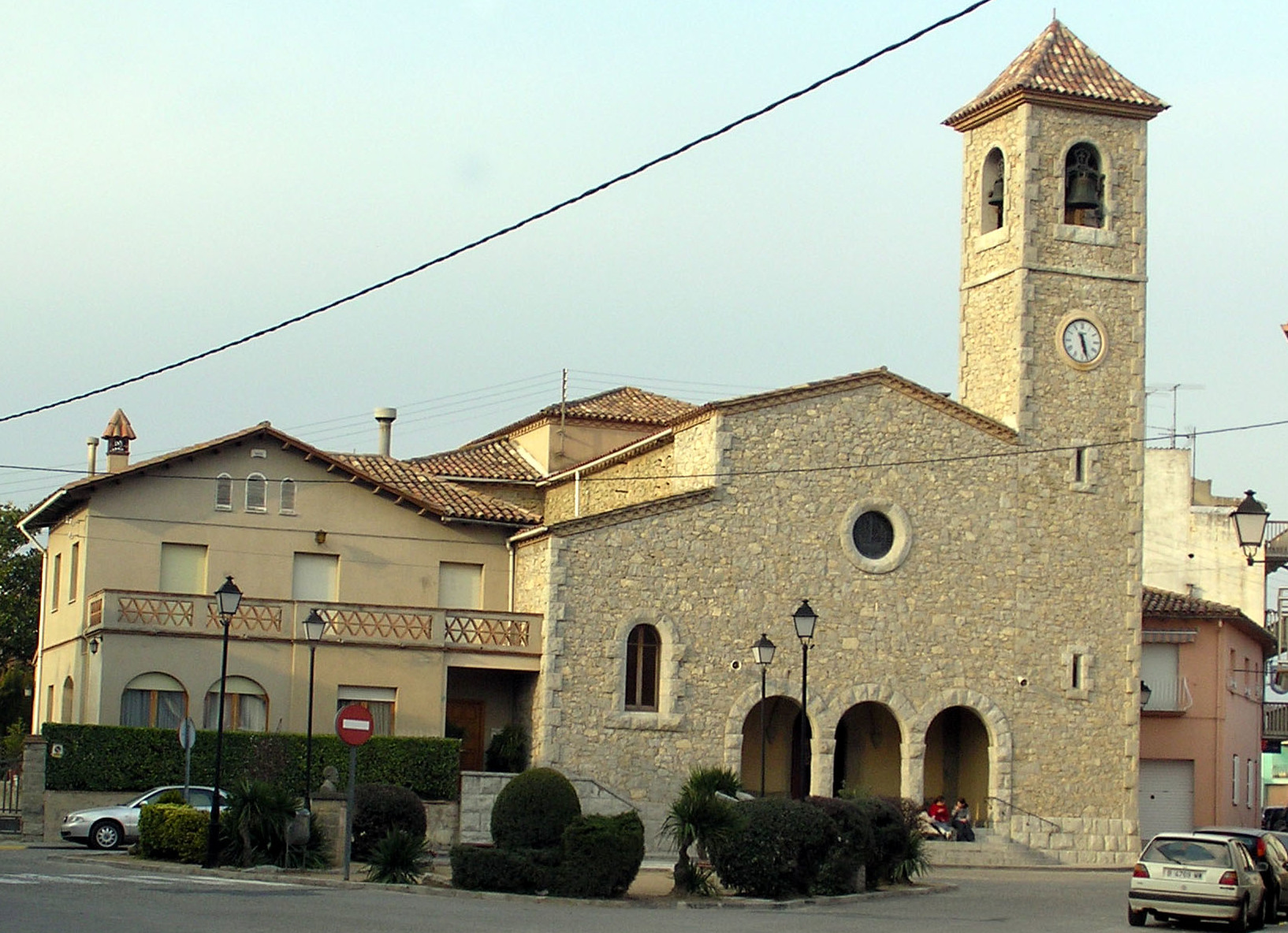
- Plaça de l'Església, Balenyà

- Flag Coat of arms

- Location in Catalonia
- Coordinates: 41°48′59″N 2°14′11″E
- Country: Spain
- Community: Catalonia
- Province: Barcelona
- Comarca: Osona

Government
  - Mayor: Anna Magem Marso (2015)

Area
  - Total: 17.4 km^{2} (6.7 sq mi)

Population (2025-01-01)
  - Total: 4,021
  - Density: 231/km^{2} (599/sq mi)
- Website: www.balenya.cat

Balenyà (Catalan pronunciation: [bələˈɲa]) is a municipality in the comarca of Osona in Catalonia, Spain.
