= Sant Quirze de Besora =

- Municipality
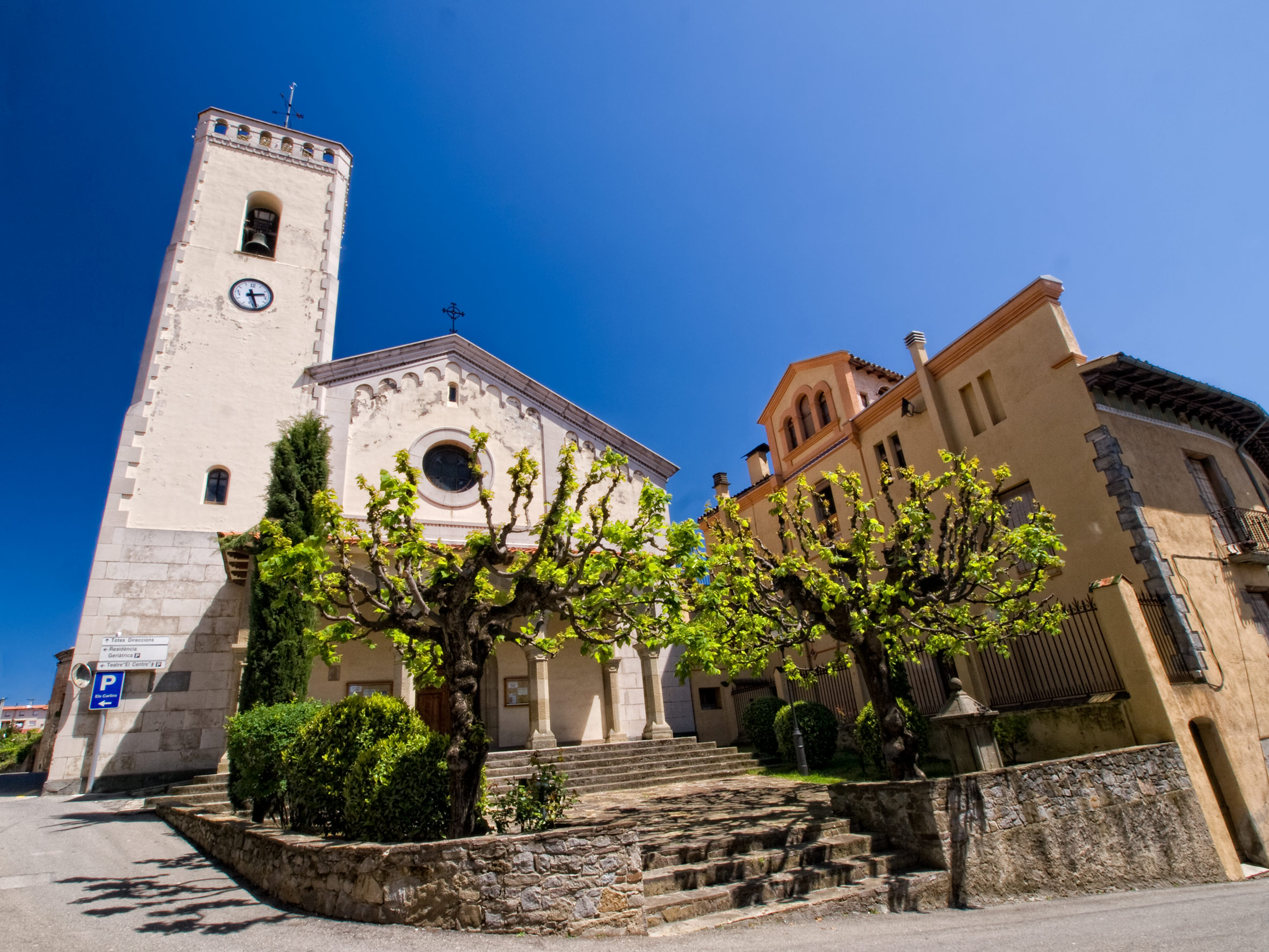
- Parish church

- Flag Coat of arms

- Location in Catalonia Sant Quirze de Besora (Spain)
- Coordinates: 42°06′12″N 2°13′13″E
- Country: Spain
- Community: Catalonia
- Province: Barcelona
- Comarca: Osona

Government
  - Mayor: David Solà Rota (2019 - ?)

Area
  - Total: 8.1 km^{2} (3.1 sq mi)
- Elevation: 587 m (1,926 ft)

Population (2025-01-01)
  - Total: 2,164
  - Density: 270/km^{2} (690/sq mi)
- Demonym(s): Santquirzenc, santquirzenca
- Website: www.ajsantquirze.cat

Sant Quirze de Besora (Catalan pronunciation: [ˈsaŋ ˈkiɾzə ðə βəˈzɔɾə]) is a municipality in the comarca of Osona in Catalonia, Spain. It is situated on the banks of the Ter river in the north of the comarca. It is on the main communication route between Barcelona and Puigcerdà, served by the C-17 road and a station on the Rodalies de Catalunya railway line. It is also linked to Prats de Lluçanès and the Berguedà by the C-149 road. There is a tradition of textile manufacture in the town, as well as a distillery and a hydroelectric power station.

Sant Quirze de Besora became part of Osona in the comarcal revision of 1990: previously it formed part of the Ripollès.

== History ==
Sant Quirze de Besora was founded as a town in 898, although there is evidence of human presence from the Iberian and Late Roman periods. The origin of the parish of Sant Quirze came about due to the repopulation policy initiated by Wilfred the Hairy. From the year 898, the farmers living in the area became an organized community due to the security provided by the Besora castle. Around the 11th century, Countess Ermessenda of Carcassonne regularly stayed in Sant Quirze de Besora, being considered the most powerful woman in the history of Catalonia. Ermessenda became the wife of Count Ramon Borrell, and was therefore the mother of Berenguer Ramon I and the grandmother of Ramon Berenguer I. After her husband's death, she took control of the counties of Barcelona, Girona, and Osona. She lived through times of change and embodied the power of the House of Barcelona, especially when she served as the guardian of her grandson Ramon Berenguer I. Ermessenda became the clearest representation of the old power of the House of Barcelona, facing the rebellious nobility. Her role was crucial in halting the power ambitions of the nobility. As for her connection to Sant Quirze de Besora, we can say that the Besora castle was one of many castles under her control. Within this castle, she stayed sporadically, as her usual residence was in Barcelona. However, she retired there, already defeated by her grandson Ramon Berenguer I, in 1057. Countess Ermessenda died on March 1, 1058, in a house next to the church of Sant Quirze de Besora. Currently, one of the town's squares is named after her.

During the industrial era, several bourgeois business families, such as the Guixà and Juncadella, attracted by the power of the Ter River, established significant textile factories in Sant Quirze, which would drive the industrial revolution and the workers' movement in the municipality.

== Demography ==
Historical population
Year	Pop.	±%
1900	2.207	—
1910	2.452	+11.1%
1920	2.7	+10.1%
1930	3.034	+12.4%
1940	2.306	−24.0%
1950	1.886	−18.2%
1960	2.019	+7.1%
1970	2.033	+0.7%
1981	2.064	+1.5%
1990	2.04	−1.2%
1992	2.01	−1.5%
1994	2.011	+0.0%
1996	2.011	+0.0%
1998	2.005	−0.3%
2000	1.978	−1.3%
2002	1.986	+0.4%
2004	1.985	−0.1%
2006	2.069	+4.2%
2008	2.215	+7.1%
2009	2.257	+1.9%
2010	2.24	−0.8%
2012	2.187	−2.4%
2014	2.148	−1.8%
2016	2.125	−1.1%
2018	2.107	−0.8%

El 1934 es va produir la segregació de Montesquiu.
