= Les Masies de Voltregà =

- Municipality
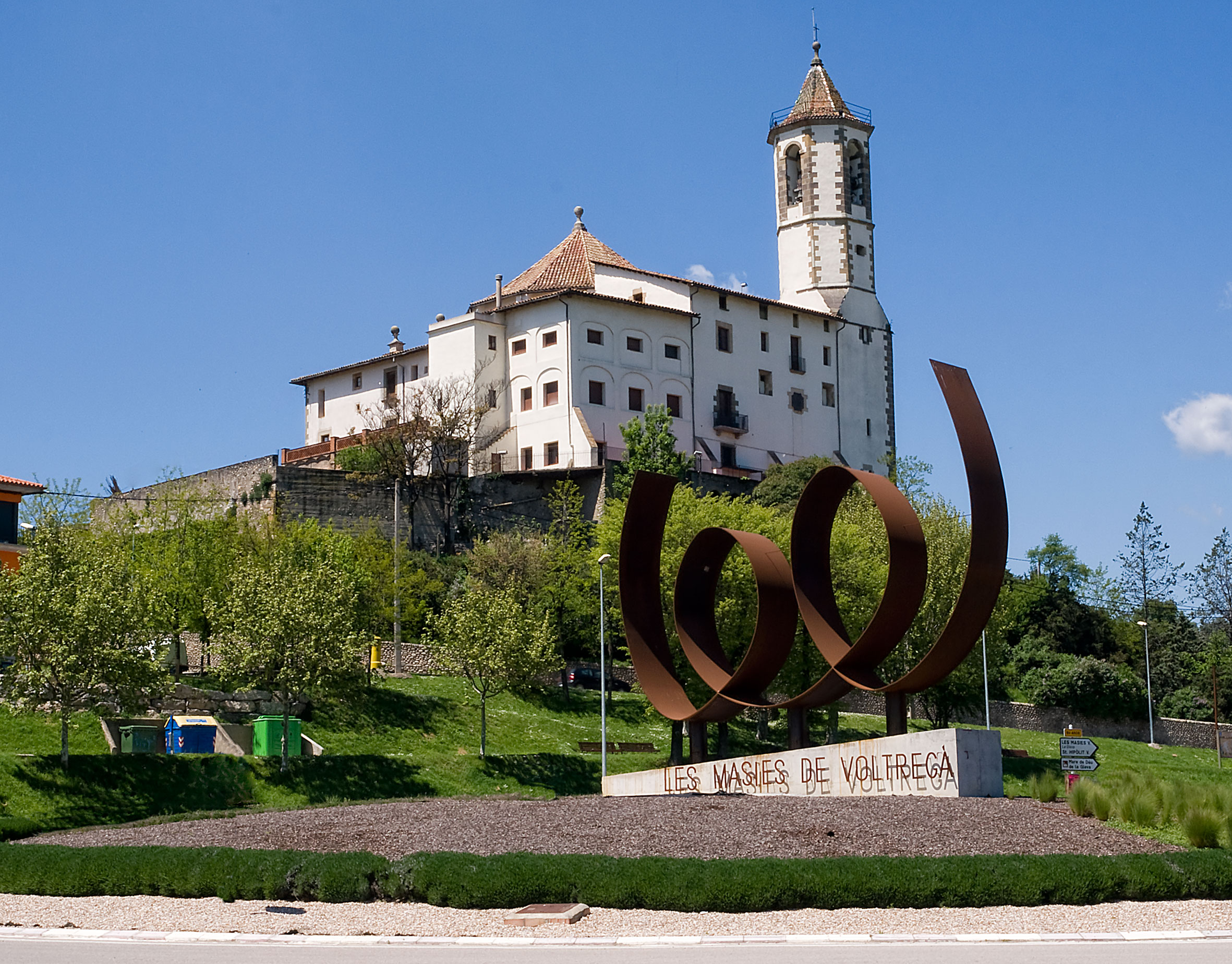
- Santuari de la Gleva at entrance to Masies de Voltregà

- Flag Coat of arms

- Location in Catalonia
- Coordinates: 42.02650°N 2.23400°E
- Country: Spain
- Community: Catalonia
- Province: Barcelona
- Comarca: Osona

Government
  - Mayor: Sergi Vilamala Bastarras (2015)

Area
  - Total: 22.4 km^{2} (8.6 sq mi)

Population (2025-01-01)
  - Total: 3,345
  - Density: 149/km^{2} (387/sq mi)
- Website: www.lesmasiesdevoltrega.cat

Les Masies de Voltregà (Catalan pronunciation: [ləz məˈziəz ðə βultɾəˈɣa]) is a municipality in the comarca of Osona in Catalonia, Spain. It surrounds Sant Hipòlit de Voltregà.
