= Montesquiu =

- Municipality
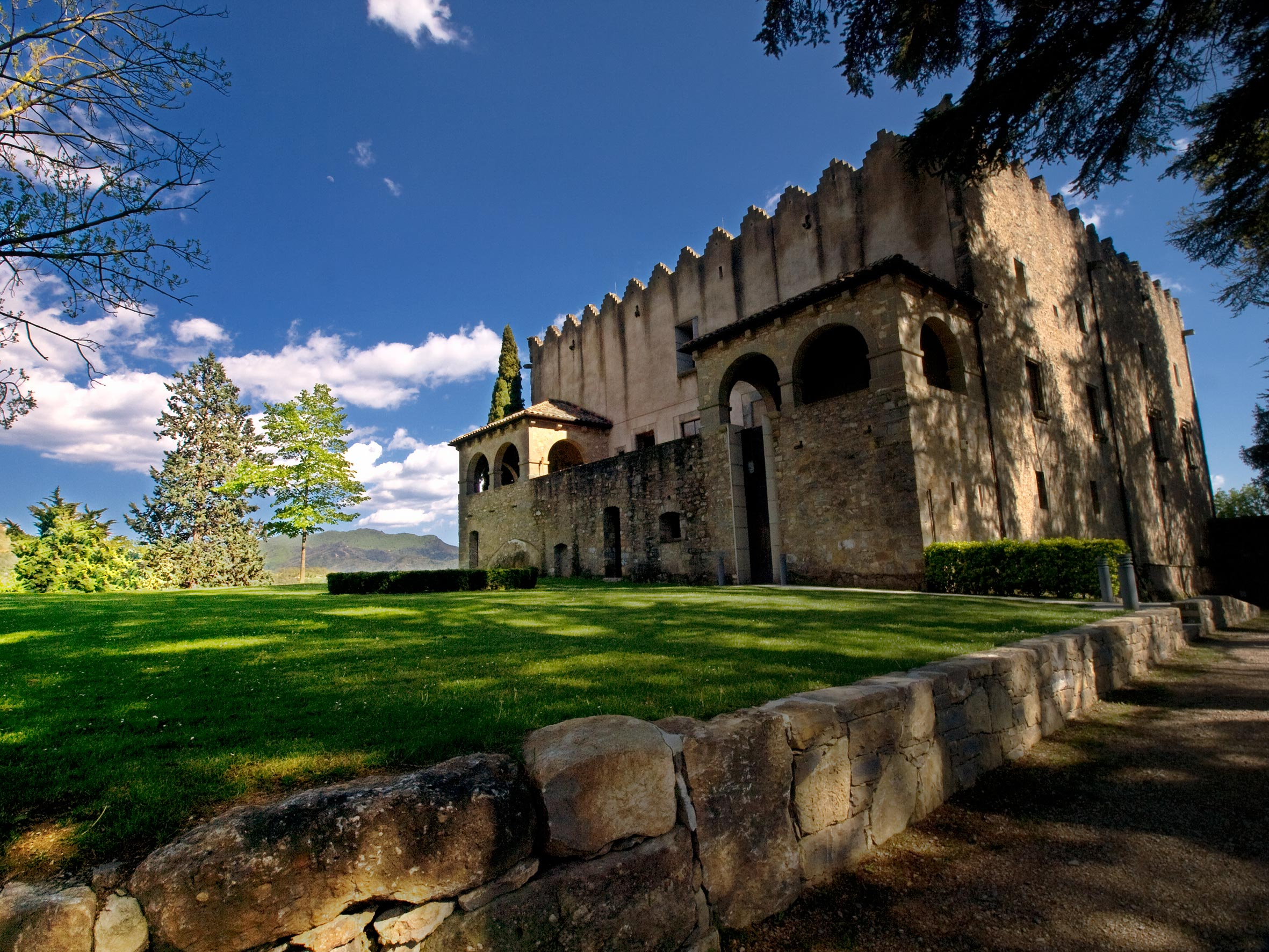
- Montesquiu castle

- Flag Coat of arms

- Location in Catalonia Montesquiu (Spain)
- Coordinates: 42°06′36″N 2°12′35″E
- Country: Spain
- Community: Catalonia
- Province: Barcelona
- Comarca: Osona

Government
  - Mayor: Elisabet Ferreres Vergés (2015)

Area
  - Total: 4.9 km^{2} (1.9 sq mi)
- Elevation: 577 m (1,893 ft)

Population (2025-01-01)
  - Total: 1,131
  - Density: 230/km^{2} (600/sq mi)
- Demonym(s): Montesquiuenc, montesquiuenca
- Website: www.montesquiu.cat

Montesquiu (Catalan pronunciation: [muntəsˈkiw]) is a municipality in the comarca (county) of Osona in Catalonia, Spain. It is situated on the banks of the Ter river in the north of the comarca. It is on the main communication route between Barcelona and Puigcerdà, served by the N-152 road and a station on the Renfe railway line. The thirteenth-century castle is used for cultural events during the summer. Montesquiu became part of Osona in the comarcal revision of 1990. Previously, it formed part of Ripollès.

== Demography ==
1900	1930	1950	1970	1986	2007
n/a	n/a	1087	1069	932	861
