= Tona, Spain =

Tona
- Municipality
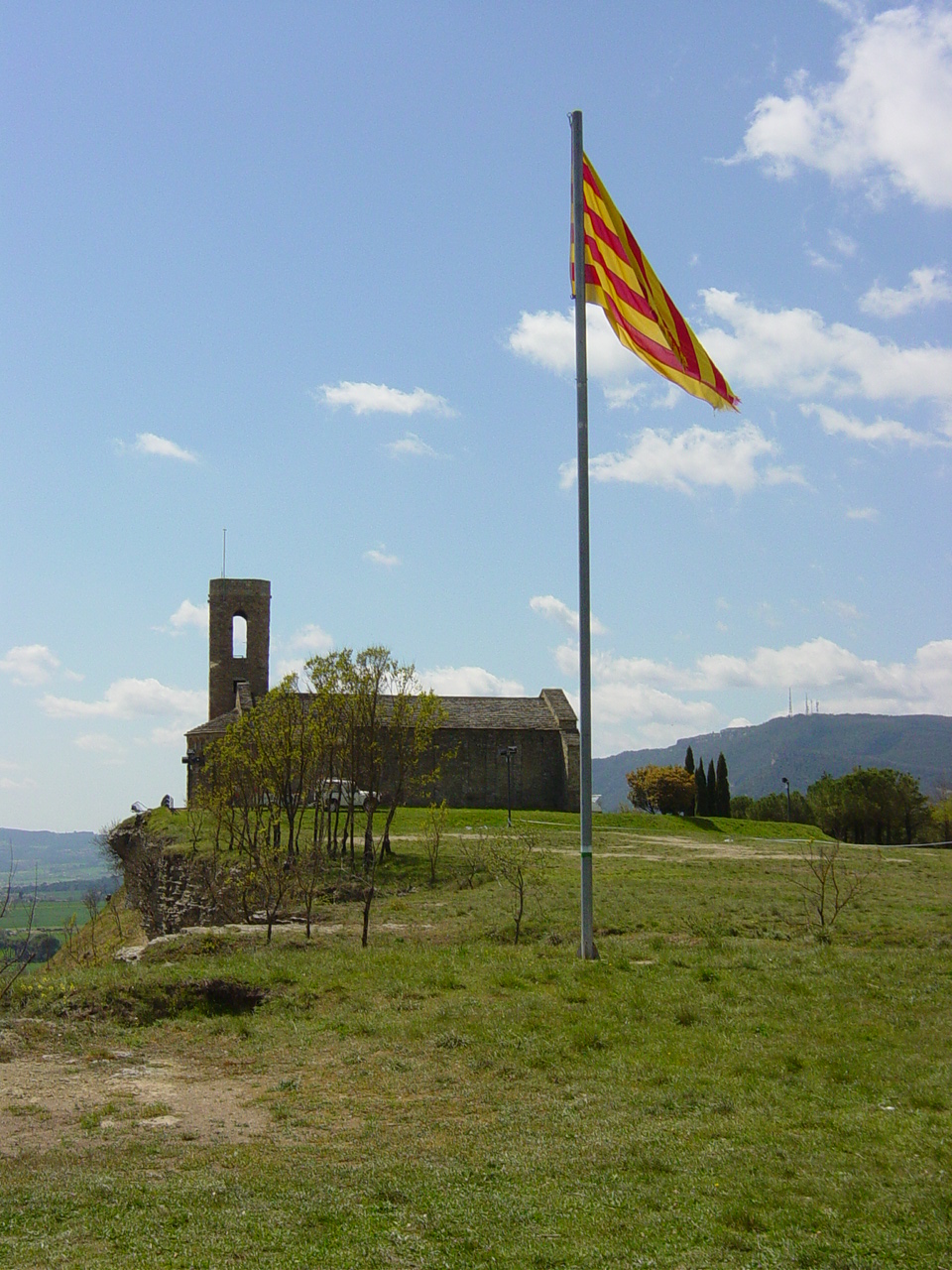
- Tona castle

- Flag Coat of arms

- Location in Catalonia Tona (Spain)
- Coordinates: 41°51′N 2°14′E
- Country: Spain
- Community: Catalonia
- Province: Barcelona
- Comarca: Osona

Government
  - Mayor: Amadeu Lleopart i Costa (2019)

Area
  - Total: 16.5 km^{2} (6.4 sq mi)
- Elevation: 600.2 m (1,969 ft)

Population (2025-01-01)
  - Total: 8,527
  - Density: 517/km^{2} (1,340/sq mi)
- Demonym(s): Tonenc, tonenca
- Postal code: 08551
- Website: www.tona.cat

Tona (Catalan pronunciation: [ˈtonə]) is a municipality in the province of Barcelona, part of the autonomous community of Catalonia, northeastern Spain. It is located in the Plain of Vic, in the comarca of Osona. It includes two exclaves to the east.

As of 2007, the estimated population stands at 7,800.
