= Taradell =

- Municipality
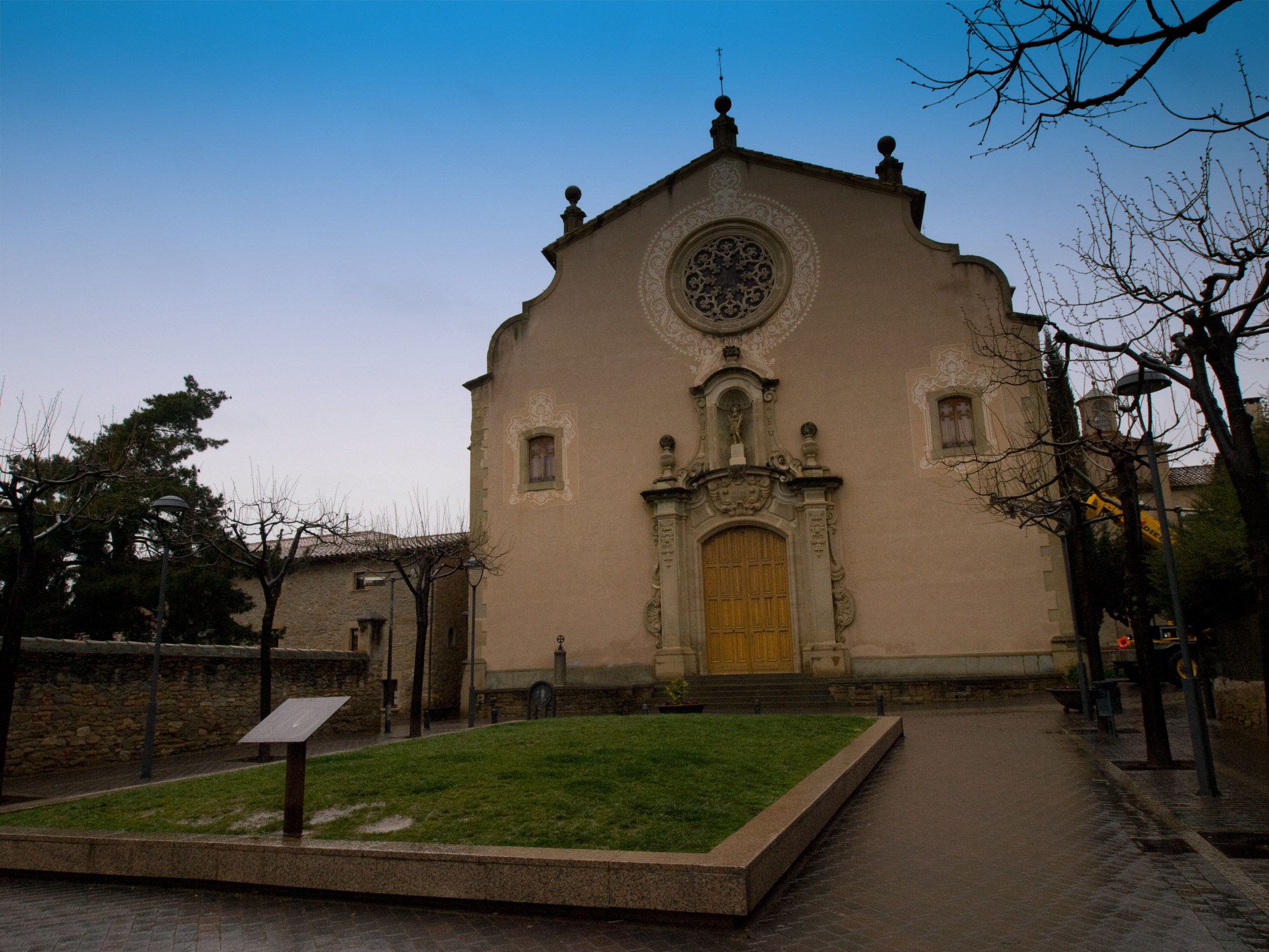
- Church of St. Genís

- Coat of arms

- Location in Catalonia Taradell (Spain)
- Coordinates: 41°52′N 2°17′E
- Country: Spain
- Community: Catalonia
- Province: Barcelona
- Comarca: Osona

Government
  - Mayor: Lluís Verdaguer Vivet (2015)

Area
  - Total: 26.5 km^{2} (10.2 sq mi)

Population (2025-01-01)
  - Total: 6,854
  - Density: 259/km^{2} (670/sq mi)
- Website: www.taradell.cat

Taradell (Catalan pronunciation: [təɾəˈðeʎ]) is a municipality in the Osona of the Province of Barcelona.

Historical Populations
1900	1930	1950	1970	1981	1986	2006
1,651	2,192	2,379	3,248	4,114	4,259	5,764

== History ==
The town has been documented since the 10th century.
