= Osona =

Coordinates: 41°56′53″N 2°14′42″E

- Comarca
- Flag Coat of arms

- Country: Spain
- Autonomous community: Catalonia
- Province: Barcelona, Girona
- Region: Central Catalonia
- Capital: Vic
- Municipalities: List: Alpens, Balenyà, El Brull, Calldetenes, Centelles, Espinelves, Folgueroles, Gurb, Lluçà, Malla, Manlleu, Les Masies de Roda, Les Masies de Voltregà, Montesquiu, Muntanyola, Olost, Oristà, Orís, Perafita, Prats de Lluçanès, Roda de Ter, Rupit i Pruit, Sant Agustí de Lluçanès, Sant Bartomeu del Grau, Sant Boi de Lluçanès, Sant Hipòlit de Voltregà, Sant Julià de Vilatorta, Sant Martí d'Albars, Sant Martí de Centelles, Sant Pere de Torelló, Sant Quirze de Besora, Sant Sadurní d'Osormort, Sant Vicenç de Torelló, Santa Cecília de Voltregà, Santa Eugènia de Berga, Santa Eulàlia de Riuprimer, Santa Maria de Besora, Santa Maria de Corcó, Seva, Sobremunt, Sora, Taradell, Tavertet, Tavèrnoles, Tona, Torelló, Vic, Vidrà, Viladrau, Vilanova de Sau

Government
  - Body: Osona Comarcal Council
  - President: Gerard Sancho (Junts)

Area
  - Total: 1,245.1 km^{2} (480.7 sq mi)

Population (2014)
  - Total: 154,559
  - Density: 124.13/km^{2} (321.51/sq mi)
- adjusted following Moianès creation
- Demonym(s): osonenc (m.) osonenca (f.)
- Time zone: UTC+1 (CET)
  - Summer (DST): UTC+2 (CEST)
- Largest municipality: Vic
- Website: www.ccosona.cat

Osona (Catalan pronunciation: [uˈzonə]) is a comarca situated in the central region of Catalonia, Spain. Its capital is Vic. Its population in 2001 was 129,543. Osona covers roughly the same area as the historic Catalan county of Osona. The name Osona comes from Ausetans (Latin: Ausetani), a group of Iberian people who had their capital in Ausa (today Vic); the Romans called the area Ausone or Ausona. While most of the comarca is within the province of Barcelona, the municipalities of Espinelves, Vidrà and Viladrau form part of the province of Girona.

The most important town of Osona is Vic, its capital and an important and ancient urban center in this natural region that lies in the midst of the Plain of Vic. Other significant towns in the plain are Manlleu and Tona.

This natural depression in the center of the region was carved by river Ter and its tributaries and makes up a big part of Osona's land. It is surrounded by mountains: The Sub-Pyrenees, with Bellmunt mountain towering in the north, the Lluçanès (Pre-Pyrenees) to the north-west and Moianès high plateau in the West, the Montseny in the southeast and the Guilleries, located at the apex of the Catalan Transversal Range and the Pre-Coastal Range, in the east.

Long famous for its local sausages (especially fuet) and other pork derivatives, in recent years the area has become somewhat infamous for the pollution of its many waterways due to the factory farming of pigs and Dairy cattle. There are more pigs than people living in Osona.

In the comarcal revision of 1990, Sant Quirze de Besora became part of Osona; previously it formed part of the Ripollès. In May 2015, Osona lost the municipality of Collsuspina to the new comarca of Moianès.

== Municipalities ==
Municipality	Population (2014)	Area km^{2}
Alpens	300	13.8
Balenyà	3,724	17.4
El Brull	263	41.0
Calldetenes	2,429	5.8
Centelles	7,333	15.2
Espinelves	196	17.4
L'Esquirol	2,188	61.8
Folgueroles	2,259	10.5
Gurb	2,545	51.6
Lluçà	257	53.0
Malla	266	11.0
Manlleu	20,279	17.2
Les Masies de Roda	737	16.4
Les Masies de Voltregà	3,186	22.4
Montesquiu	895	4.9
Muntanyola	595	40.3
Olost	1,186	29.4
Orís	303	27.2
Oristà	557	68.5
Perafita	407	19.6
Prats de Lluçanès	2,624	13.8
Roda de Ter	6,124	2.2
Rupit i Pruit	300	47.8
Sant Agustí de Lluçanès	91	13.2
Sant Bartomeu del Grau	875	34.4
Sant Boi de Lluçanès	556	19.5
Sant Hipòlit de Voltregà	3,446	0.9
Sant Julià de Vilatorta	3,123	15.9
Sant Martí d'Albars	106	14.7
Sant Martí de Centelles	1,093	25.6
Sant Pere de Torelló	2,436	55.1
Sant Quirze de Besora	2,148	8.1
Sant Sadurní d'Osormort	86	30.6
Sant Vicenç de Torelló	1,975	6.6
Santa Cecília de Voltregà	173	8.6
Santa Eugènia de Berga	2,233	7.0
Santa Eulàlia de Riuprimer	1,259	13.8
Santa Maria de Besora	162	24.7
Seva	3,488	30.4
Sobremunt	83	13.8
Sora	175	31.7
Taradell	6,219	26.5
Tavèrnoles	317	18.8
Tavertet	125	32.5
Tona	8,012	16.5
Torelló	13,949	13.5
Vic	41,956	30.6
Vidrà	169	34.4
Viladrau	1,037	50.7
Vilanova de Sau	314	58.8
• Total: 50	154,559	1,245.1

== See also ==
- County of Osona (ancient county)
- Patronat d'Estudis Osonencs
- Plain of Vic
- Sub-Pyrenees
