= Puig de la Mola =

Mountain in Catalonia, Spain

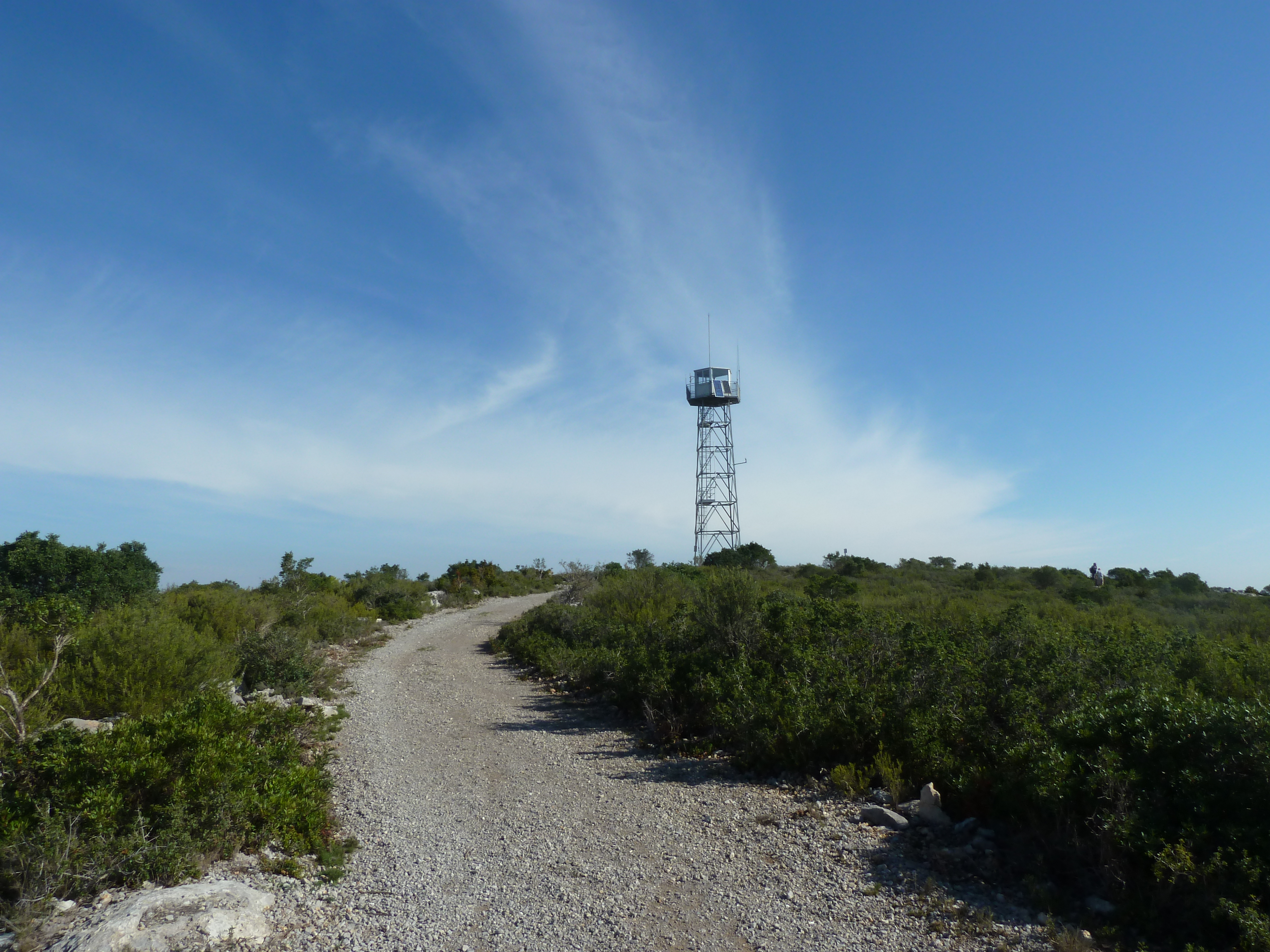

Highest point
- Elevation: 533.8 m (1,751 ft)
- Coordinates: 41°19′09.564″N 1°50′52.48″E

Geography
- Location within Catalonia
- Location: Alt Penedès, Baix Llobregat, Garraf, Catalonia
- Parent range: Garraf Massif

Puig de la Mola is a mountain in the Garraf Massif, Catalonia, Spain. It has an elevation of 533 metres above sea level.

It is located between the municipalities of Avinyonet del Penedès, Olesa de Bonesvalls (Alt Penedès), Begues (Baix Llobregat) and Olivella (Garraf)

== See also ==
- Mountains of Catalonia
