= Montau (mountain) =

Mountain in Spain

- Location within Catalonia

Highest point
- Elevation: 657.1 m (2,156 ft)
- Coordinates: 41°20′45.07″N 1°53′06.048″E

Geography
- Location: Alt Penedès, Baix Llobregat, Catalonia
- Parent range: Garraf Massif (Catalan Coastal Range)

Geology
- Mountain type: Karstic

Climbing
- First ascent: Unknown
- Easiest route: From Olesa de Bonesvalls

Montau is a mountain located in the municipal terms of Olesa de Bonesvalls (Alt Penedès) and Begues (Baix Llobregat), Catalonia, Spain. It has an elevation of 657 metres above sea level.

It is the highest point of the Garraf Massif, Catalan Coastal Range, although less conspicuous than La Morella, located closer to the coast. There is a triangulation station at the summit.

== See also ==
- Garraf Massif
- Mountains of Catalonia
