= Religion in Catalonia =

Religious beliefs in Catalonia (spain)

Religion in Catalonia (2016)
1. Roman Catholicism (58.0%)
2. Protestantism (3.00%)
3. Eastern Orthodoxy (0.90%)
4. Jehovah's Witnesses (0.60%)
5. Atheism (16.0%)
6. Agnosticism (11.9%)
7. Islam (4.80%)
8. Buddhism (1.30%)
9. Other Religions (2.40%)
10. No answer/do not know (1.10%)

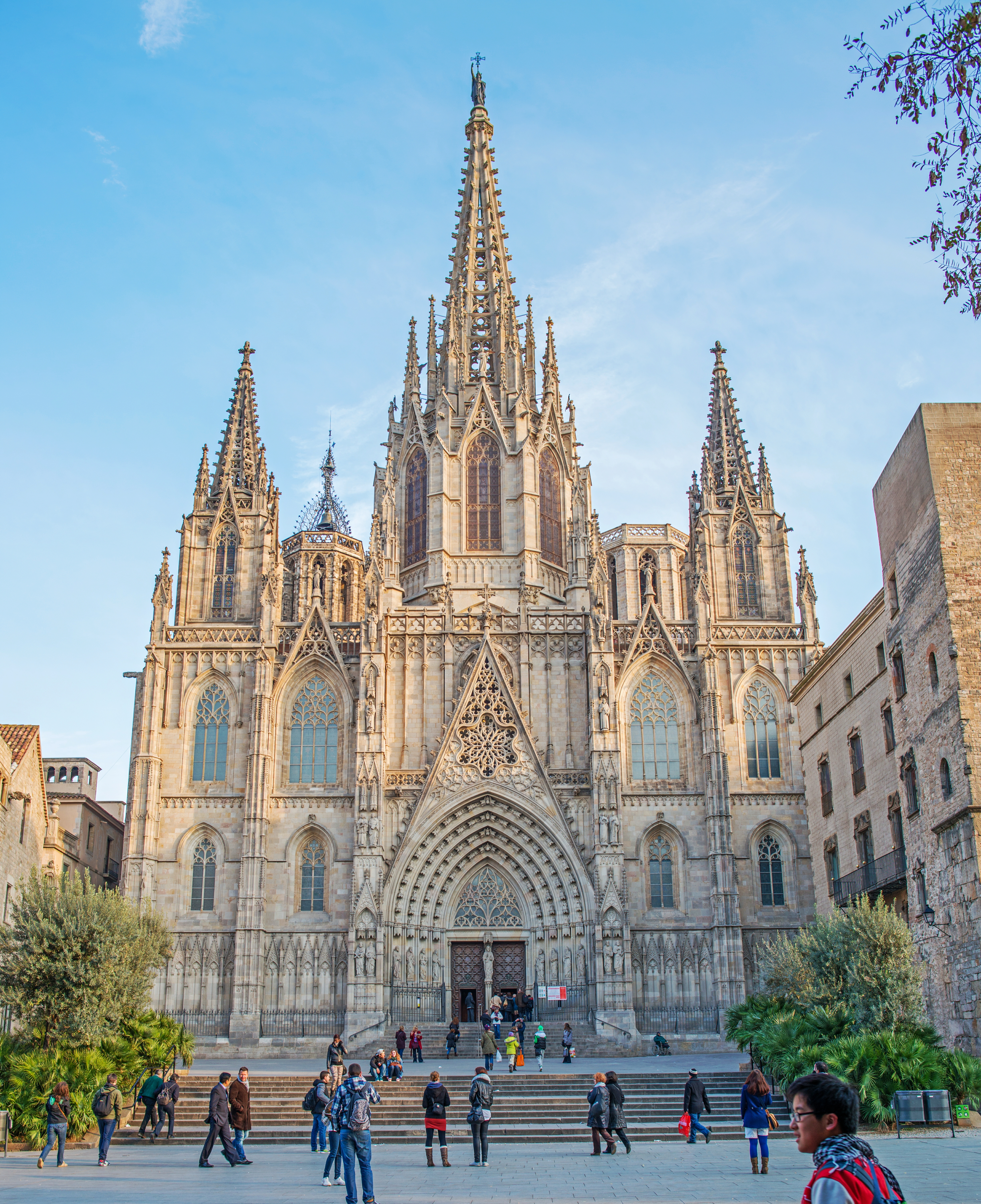
The Cathedral of Barcelona is a fine specimen of Gothic architecture.

Religion in Catalonia is diversified. Since the Expulsion of the Jews and the Moriscos in the late 15th and early 17th centuries respectively, virtually all the population was Christian, specifically Catholic, but since the 1980s there has been a trend of rapid decline of Christianity, also driven since the 1980s by the religious authorities' association with Francoist Spain. Nevertheless, according to the most recent study sponsored by the government of Catalonia, as of 2016, 61.9% of the Catalans identify as Christians, up from 56.5% in 2014, of whom 58.0% Catholics, 3.0% Protestants and Evangelicals, 0.9% Orthodox Christians and 0.6% Jehovah's Witnesses. At the same time, 16.0% of the population identify as atheists, 11.9% as agnostics, 4.8% as Muslims, 1.3% as Buddhists, and a further 2.4% as being of other religions.

== Demographics ==
=== Religions and life stances by age range ===
Source: Institut Opiniòmetre & Government of Catalonia (2016)
Religion	16–24	25–34	35–49	50–64	65+
Christianity	40.3%	44.3%	57.5%	67.7%	88.7%
Catholicism	33.3%	35.1%	56.0%	63.5%	87.1%
Jehovah's Witnesses	-	1.1%	0.7%	1.0%	0.1%
Orthodox Christianity	1.2%	2.1%	0.8%	1.0%	-
Protestantism	5.8%	6.0%	2.5%	2.2%	1.5%
Atheism	24.6%	24.8%	14.5%	17.2%	4.9%
Agnosticism	20.8%	18.9%	12.8%	7.4%	4.7%
Islam	8.1%	9.3%	6.3%	1.8%	0.3%
Buddhism	1.9%	1.1%	2.2%	1.1%	-
Judaism	-	-	-	-	-
Other religions	5.2%	0.6%	3.3%	3.0%	2.1%
Do not know	-	1.1%	0.9%	0.9%	0.9%
No answer	0.1%	-	-	0.9%	1.0%

=== Religions and life stances by province ===
Source: Institut Opiniòmetre & Government of Catalonia (2014)
Religion	Barcelona	Girona	Lleida	Tarragona
Christianity	52.7%	60.6%	71.9%	70.6%
Catholicism	49.2%	57.0%	65.7%	62.7%
Jehovah's Witnesses	0.5%	0.2%	0.2%	0.2%
Orthodox Christianity	0.5%	1.2%	3.5%	4.7%
Protestantism	2.5%	2.2%	2.5%	3.0%
Atheism	19.7%	17.0%	14.5%	11.0%
Agnosticism	14.0%	7.3%	3.5%	7.2%
Islam	6.5%	12.7%	7.7%	7.5%
Buddhism	1.5%	-	0.5%	1.5%
Judaism	-	0.2%	-	-
Other religions	2.7%	1.0%	1.2%	1.2%
Do not know	1.2%	0.5%	0.2%	-
No answer	1.5%	0.5%	0.2%	0.7%

== Religions ==
=== Baháʼí Faith ===
The Baháʼí Faith has nearly one thousand members and nine centres in Catalonia as of 2014. The first Baháʼí group in Catalonia was established in Barcelona in 1949, while the first formal centre was inaugurated in Terrassa, in the Vallès Occidental, in 1962. The Vallès Occidental is still the region where most of the Catalan Baháʼís reside, and where six out of the nine Baháʼí centres are situated. Most Baháʼís are ethnic Catalan converts, while a small minority are immigrants of Iranian or other origins.

=== Buddhism ===
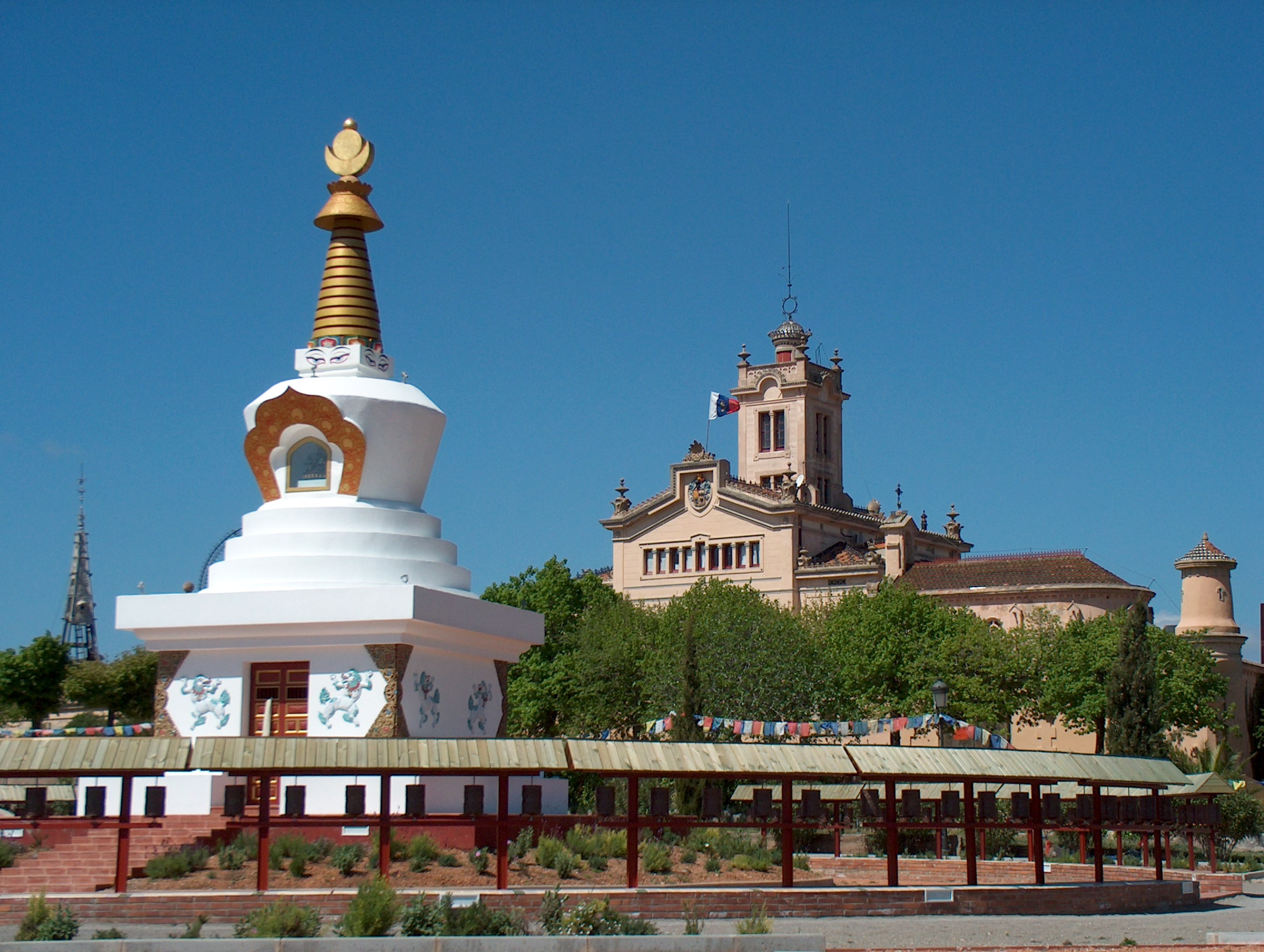
Garraf Buddhist Monastery (also called Sakya Tashi Ling), taking its name from the Garraf Massif, located in La Plana Novella, Olivella, is a former country manor built partly in Gaudí style turned into a monastery of Tibetan Buddhism.

1.3% of the Catalans identify as Buddhists as of 2016. Buddhism has 68 temples in Catalonia as of the same year, holding their services in Catalan, Spanish, Chinese and Tibetan language, reflecting the ethnic origins of the Buddhist community. The majority of Buddhists, though, are ethnic Catalan converts. These practise a variety of traditions of Buddhism, collectively represented since 2007 by the Catalan Coordinator of Buddhist Entities (Coordinadora Catalana d’Entitats Budistes, CCEB). Buddhist temples in Catalonia are mostly of the Tibetan (54%) and Zen (32%) traditions as of 2014, with the rest representing other traditions such as Pure Land Buddhism and Soka Gakkai's Nichiren Buddhism. There is also a Vipassanā meditation centre of Goenka Tradition known as "Dhamma Neru" which is located at Santa Maria de Palautordera in Barcelona.

=== Christianity ===
61.9% of the population of Catalonia identify as Christians as of 2016.

==== Catholicism ====
58.0% of the Catalans identify as Catholics as of 2016. There are 6,701 Catholic churches as of the same year.

==== Orthodox Christianity and Eastern Catholicism ====
0.9% of the Catalans identify as Orthodox Christians as of 2016. As of the same year, there are 55 Orthodox Christian and Eastern Catholic churches (most of them being Orthodox Christian) in the country, mostly for Romanian and Ukrainian-speaking communities (the few Eastern Catholic churches being of the Ukrainian Greek Catholic tradition), with a small proportion of Arabic and Greek-speaking churches.

==== Protestantism ====
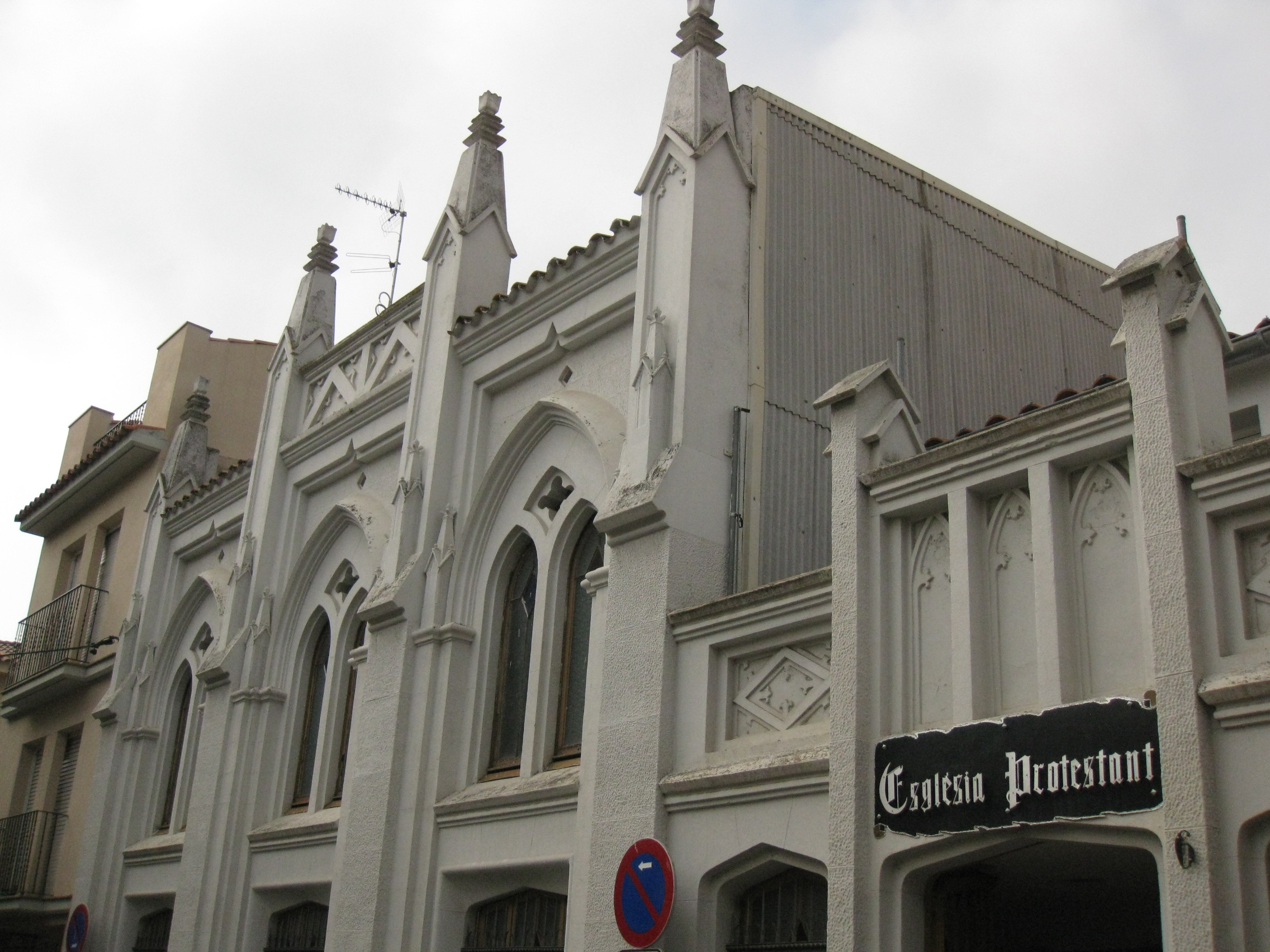
Rubí Evangelical Church, is a historical Protestant church in the city.

3.0% of the Catalans identify as Protestants or Evangelicals as of 2016. As of 2014 there are 725 Protestant and Evangelical churches in Catalonia, which conduct their services mostly in Spanish, Catalan, English, Romanian, and a minority in Korean, Russian, Brazilian Portuguese and African languages. Many followers are immigrants from South America, Africa and Eastern Europe. Most churches are Evangelical, 469 of them belonging to Pentecostalism, while historical Protestantism (Anglicanism, Lutheranism, Methodism, Presbyterianism) is represented by less than 20% of the churches.

==== Restorationism ====
===== Adventism =====
The Seventh-day Adventist Church has about 1,500 members in Catalonia, belonging to 24 churches. Most of these churches hold their services in Spanish and Catalan, with a minority using Romanian, and an even smaller minority using languages of Ghana.

===== Jehovah's Witnesses =====
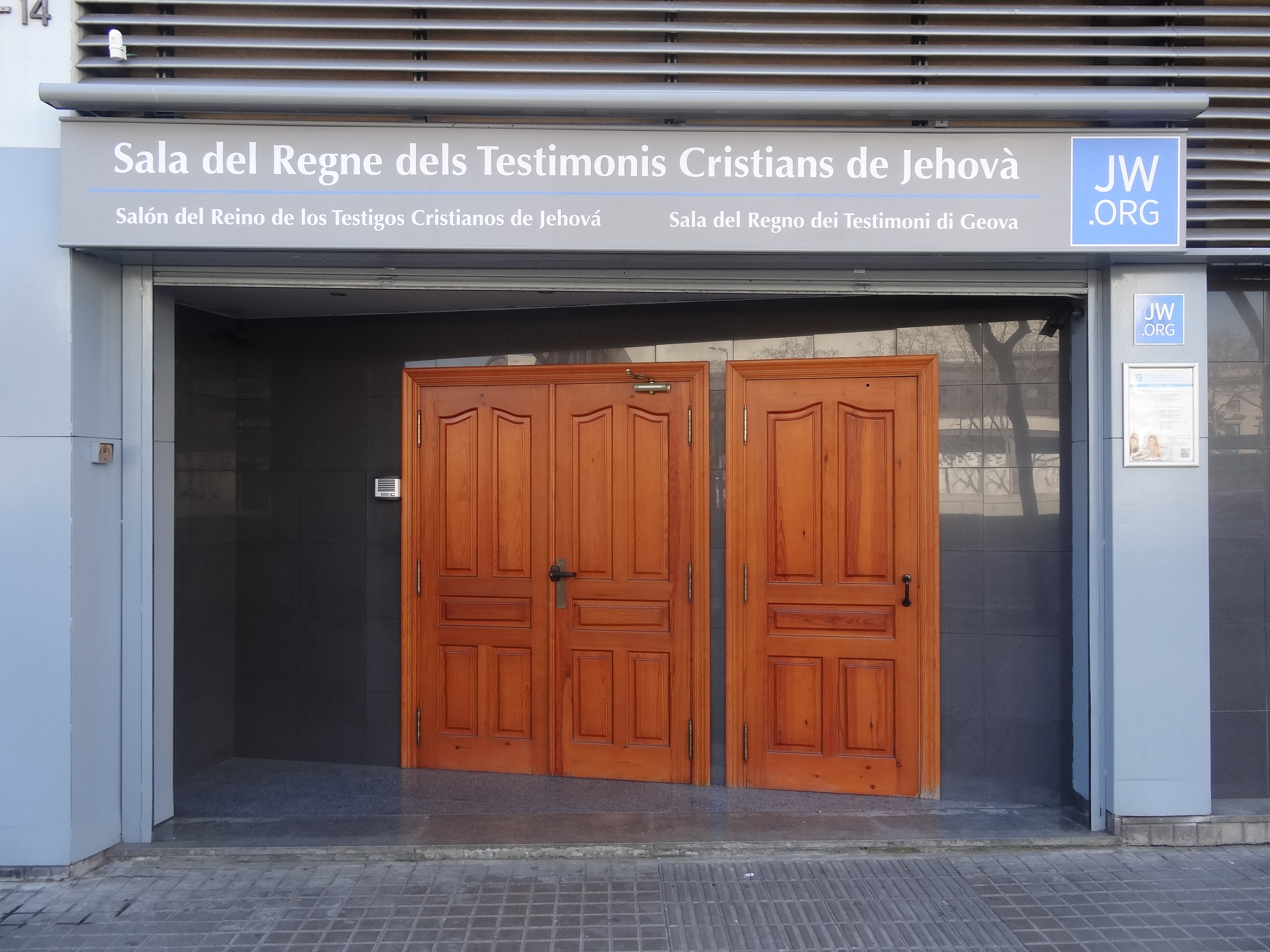
Kingdom hall in Barcelona.

0.6% of the Catalans identify as Jehovah's Witnesses as of 2014. As of the same year, there are 118 Jehovah's kingdom halls in the country, found in all co-marches of Catalonia but with a high concentration in the province of Barcelona. Most Jehovah's Witnesses are ethnic Catalans.

===== Mormonism =====
The Church of Jesus Christ of Latter-day Saints, the major body of Mormonism, has more than 6,000 members and 15 places of worship as of 2014, most of them using Spanish as their liturgical language. Many Mormons in Catalonia are South American immigrants, and this is the reason why Spanish is the primary language of the Mormon communities in the country.

=== Germanic Heathenry ===
Germanic Heathenry is represented in Catalonia by "Gotland Forn Sed" (Scandinavian Germanic for "Gothland Old Belief"). Catalonia in the early Middle Ages was known as the March of Gothia within the Carolingian Empire. It was an area of settlement of Visigoths and the same name "Catalonia" (Catalunya) is traditionally explained as being an alteration of "Gothland", through the Latinisation Gothalandia, and then the early alteration Cathalaunia.

=== Hinduism ===
Hinduism has 27 temples in Catalonia as of 2014, 14 of which are situated in the province of Barcelona. The religion is mostly represented by Indian immigrants, though there is also a significant number of Catalan converts. Indeed, the vast majority of Hindu temples hold their services in Catalan or Spanish language. Hindus in Catalonia follow a variety of traditions of worship and thought.

=== Islam ===
Islam had a long presence in parts of present-day Catalan territory and the historical principality of Catalonia stretching from early 8th century to early 17th century. Nowadays, 4.8% of the population of Catalonia identify as Muslims as of 2016, largely of Maghrebi, Sub-Saharan and South Asian origin, but also with a significant contribution of ethnic Catalans, ethnic Spaniards and others. There are 256 mosques in Catalonia as of the same year, most of them holding their services in Arabic, with a smaller proportion of mosques serving in Urdu and an even smaller one in some African languages. Nearly all mosques are of the Sunni tradition, with only one mosque representing Shia Islam. There are also six Sufi centres. As of 2014 there are five organisations of Muslims in Catalonia: the Catalan Islamic Federation (Federació Islàmica Catalana), the Islamic Federative Council of Catalonia (Federació Consell Islàmic de Catalunya), the Union of Islamic Communities of Catalonia (Unió de Comunitats Islàmiques de Catalunya), the Union of Islamic Cultural Centres of Catalonia (Unió de Centres Culturals Islàmics de Catalunya) and an umbrella organisation, the Islamic Junta (Junta Islàmica).

=== Judaism ===
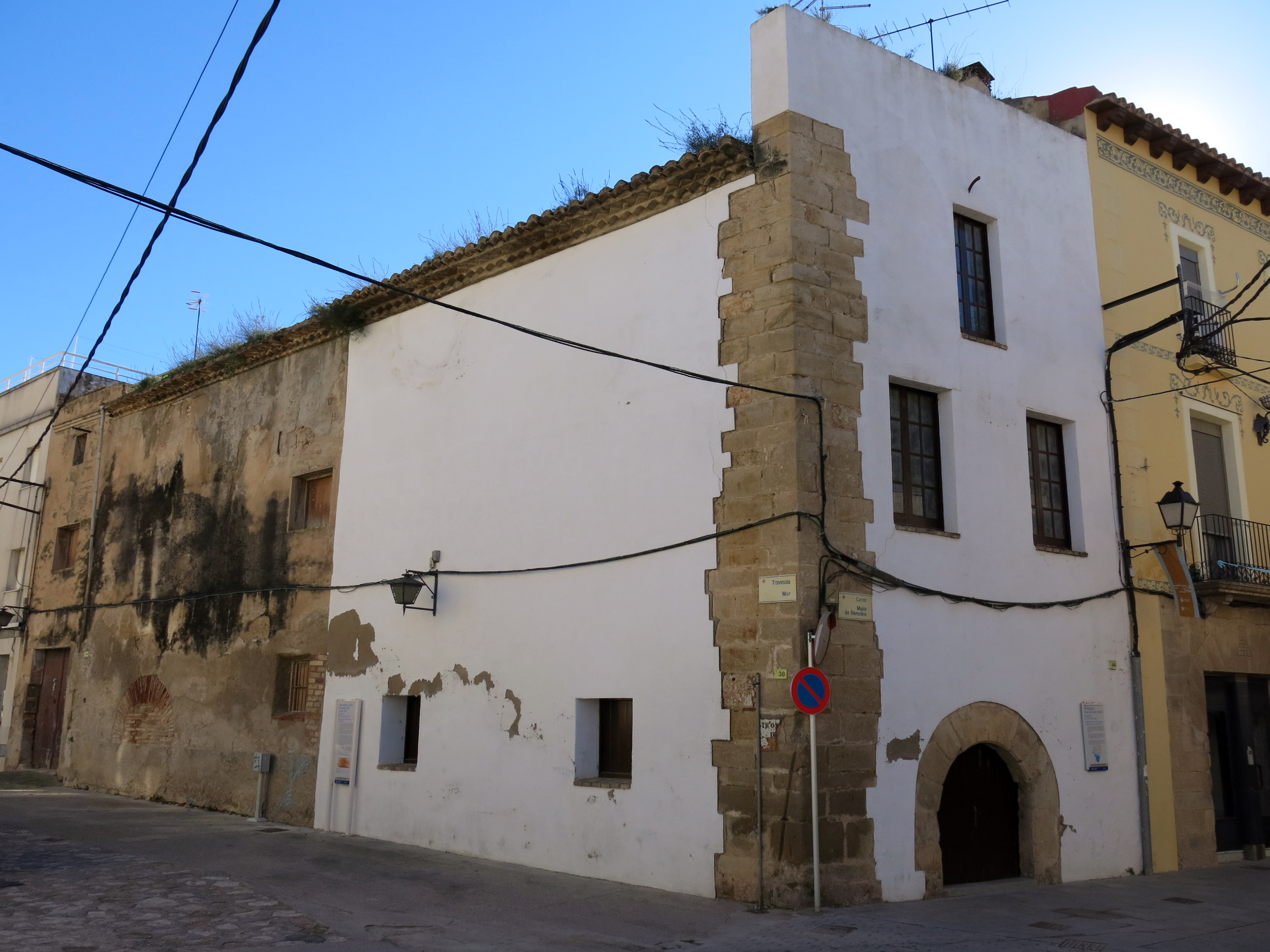
Ancient synagogue in Tortosa.

Jews and Judaism also had a long presence in many parts of present-day Catalonia and the historical principality of Catalonia from antiquity to the late 15th century. Nowadays, Jews are about 15,000 as of 2014, and there are four synagogues in the country. Not all Jews are followers of the Jewish religion. Indeed, 80% of Jews in Catalonia are either atheist, agnostic or practice other religions while only 20% are practice Judaism. The Israelitic Community of Barcelona (Comunitat Israelita de Barcelona, CIB), is the oldest Jewish religious community in Catalonia, founded in 1918, and follows Orthodox Judaism. In 1992 the Jewish Community Atid of Catalonia (Comunitat Jueva Atid de Catalunya) was established as a splinter of the CIB, adopting Reform Judaism. In the early 2000s a Chabad-Lubavitch, Hasidic Orthodox, outreach centre was founded in Catalonia. In 2006 another Reform group, the Progressive Jewish Community Bet Shalom, was founded as a splinter of Atid.

Ethnically, Jews who belong to the CIB are predominantly Sephardi, although there is a small minority of Ashkenazi as well. Members of Atid are, instead, mostly of South American origin, specifically Argentines. In conclusion, Bet Shalom predominantly hosts ethnic Catalan converts, and other minorities of converts without ethnic Jewish origin.

=== Sikhism ===
Sikhism in Catalonia has ten temples (gurdwaras) as of 2014 and some thousands of believers. Virtually all Sikhs are Punjabis who immigrated from the Punjab region of India, Sikhism being strongly linked to the Punjabi ethnicity.

=== Taoism ===
Taoism has six registered temples in Catalonia as of 2014, most of them holding their services in Catalan or Spanish language. Of these temples, five are situated in the province of Barcelona, where most Chinese immigrants, who the temples serve, are gathered. There are also many ethnic Catalan converts. Catalan Taoists have established the Taoist Association of Catalonia (Associació Taoista de Catalunya), led by the Chinese Taoist priest Tian Chengyang, while at the same time there are many Chinese Taoist centres which do not use Catalan language and do not integrate in the broader society.

The first Taoist group in Catalonia was established in 1979 by a Catholic priest of Chinese origin, Peter Yang, who proposed a synthesis of Taoism and Christianity. All the other centres have been established from 2000 onwards. Another Taoist temple was opened in 2014 by the Chinese of Barcelona, led by master Liu Zemin, a 21st-generation descendant of poet, soldier and prophet Liu Bowen (1311-1375). The temple, located in the district of Sant Martí and inaugurated in the presence of the People's Republic of China consul Qu Chengwu, enshrines 28 deities of the province of China where most of the Chinese in Barcelona come from.

== Irreligion, atheism and agnosticism ==
27.9% of the Catalans identify as irreligious as of 2016. Of them, 16.0% are atheists and 11.9% are agnostics.

== See also ==
- Religion in Barcelona
- Religion in Spain

== Citations ==
=== Sources ===
- Capdevila, Alexandra (2013). "Entre el catolicisme, l'agnosticisme i l'ateisme. Una aproximació al perfil religiós dels catalans" (PDF) (in Catalan). Centre d'Estudis d'Opinió (CEO): 86. B.17768-2013.
- ISOR researchers (2014). "El mapa de les minories religioses a Catalunya — Informe d'actualització sobre les confessions minoritàries a Catalunya" (PDF). ISOR — Investigacions en sociologia de la religió, Government of Catalonia. Archived from the original (PDF) on 27 September 2017.
