= Olesa =

Olesa may refer to:

- Olesa de Bonesvalls, town in the comarca of Alt Penedès
- Olesa de Montserrat, municipality in the comarca of Baix Llobregat
