= Sakya Tashi Ling =

Buddhist monastery in Garraf, Catalonia, Spain

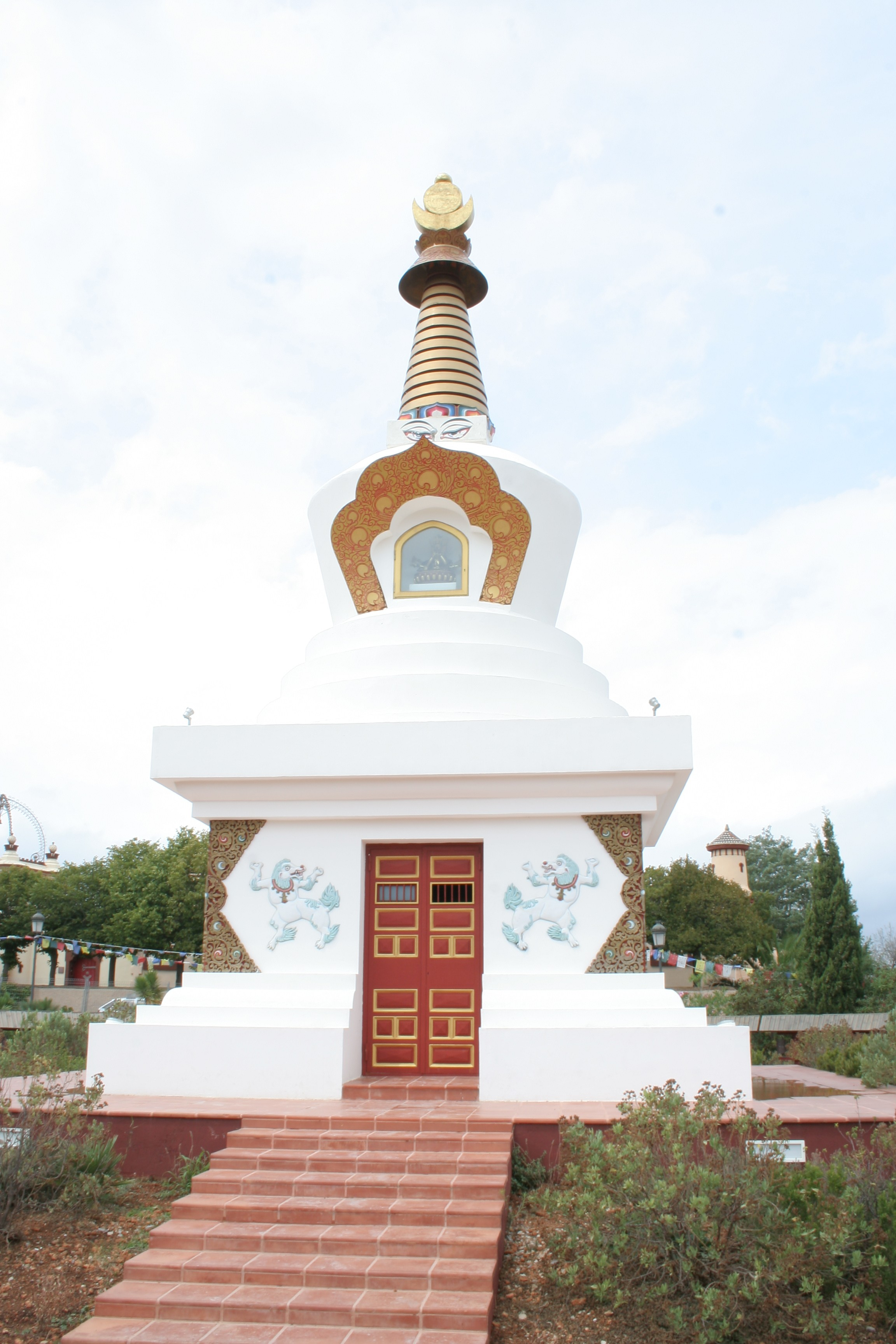

- Location within Province of Barcelona Location within Spain
- Interactive map of Sakya Tashi Ling

Monastery information
- Established: July 1996

Site
- Location: Garraf, Barcelona, Catalonia
- Country: Spain
- Coordinates: 41°17′22″N 1°51′12″E

Sakya Tashi Ling (Tibetan: ས་སྐྱ་བཀྲ་ཤིས་གླིང་, Wylie: Sa-skya Bkra-shis Gling) is a monastery belonging to one of four Buddhist schools from Tibet, the Sakyapa tradition. It is an ancient order that follows the Tibetan spiritual leader and ancient king Sakya Trizin. The monastery is ruled by Lama Jamyang Tashi Dorje. It was built in 1905 by a family of "indians" (Catalan immigrants who became wealthy in the Americas), called the Palau Novella which passed into the hands of the Buddhist community, Sakya Tashi Ling. They restored the building and installed a museum inside. It was re-established in July 1996, in the municipality of Olivella in the comarca of Garraf, Barcelona, Catalonia, Spain.

Ten years after its foundation, the community moved into the Plana Novella palace, deep inside the Garraf Natural Park, 40 minutes away from Barcelona. It is not the first Buddhist monastery in Catalonia. The first one is Kagyu Samye Dzong, founded in 1977.
