= Castell d'Eramprunyà =

Castle in Gavà, Catalonia, Spain

Eramprunyà Castle Bien de Interés Cultural
- Castell d'Eramprunyà
- Gavà, Province of Barcelona, Spain
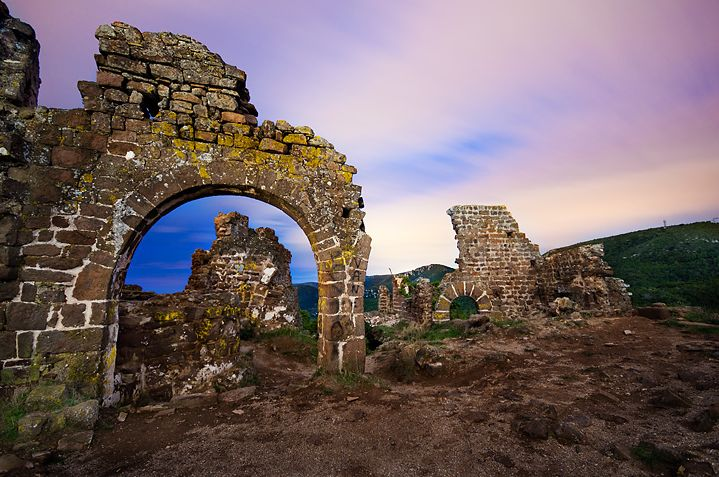
- Ruins of the castle

Site information
- Type: Castle

Location
- Coordinates: 41.3140°N 1.9572°E

Site history
- Built: c. 10th century. Designated as a BIC on November 8, 1988.

The Eramprunyà Castle (in Catalan: Castell d'Eramprunyà) is located in the municipality of Gavà in the Baix Llobregat comarca of Catalonia, Spain.

== History ==
The castle served as the administrative center of a medieval territory known as the Eramprunyà Castle Term, which once encompassed the modern municipalities of Gavà, Begues, Castelldefels, Sant Climent de Llobregat, Viladecans, and part of Sant Boi de Llobregat.

Constructed as part of the defensive frontier between Al-Andalus and the Carolingian Empire, the castle also functioned as a headquarter for political, economic, and military control between the Garraf and Llobregat regions. It was originally owned by the Counts of Barcelona. In the 14th century, it was acquired by the March family, known for their knights and poets. During the Remensa Wars of the 15th century, the castle sustained significant damage. Despite this, various families held the castle and the Eramprunyà barony until the late 19th century, when it was purchased by Manuel Girona i Agrafel.

== Description ==
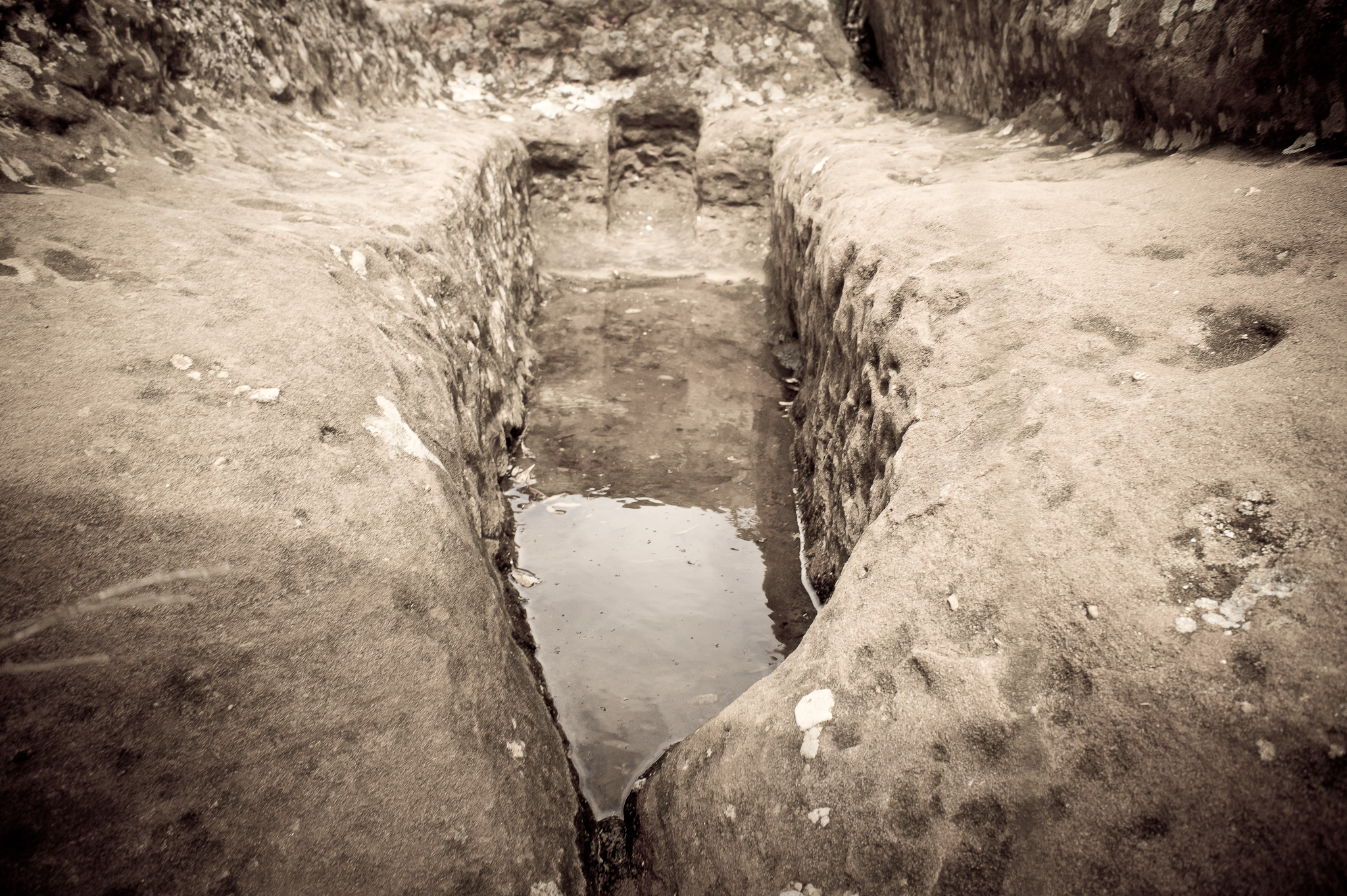
Detail of one of the anthropomorphic tombs at the castle.

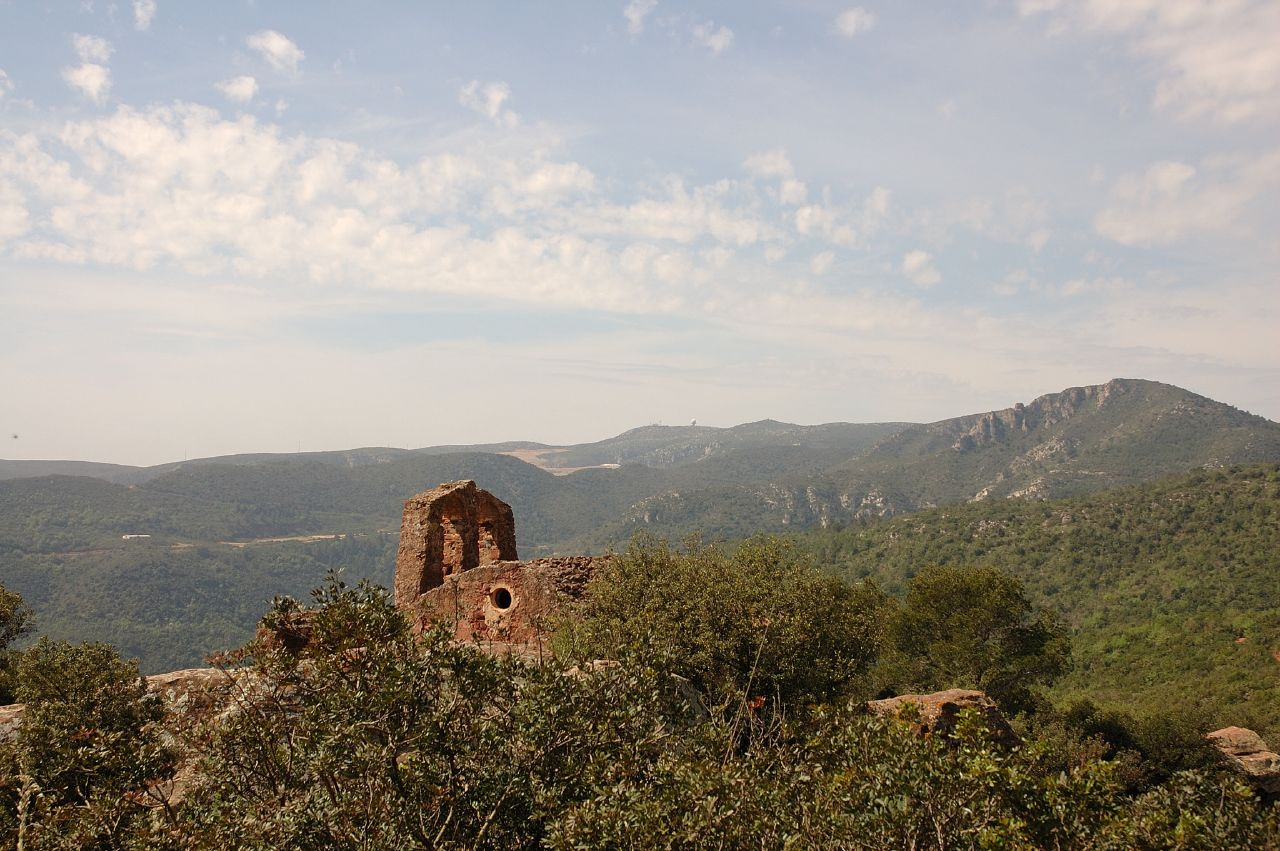
Chapel of Sant Miquel d'Eramprunyà.

The ruins of Eramprunyà Castle sit atop a mountain flanked by cliffs, offering panoramic views of the Llobregat Delta and parts of the Garraf. The complex comprises three fortified enclosures: the upper or sovereign enclosure at 402 meters (1,319 feet) altitude, housing the ruins of a Gothic castle-palace; the lower (jussà) enclosure at 392 meters (1,286 feet), containing the Romanesque-style Chapel of Sant Miquel d'Eramprunyà (though modified over time); and the outer enclosure at 319 meters (1,047 feet), where significant portions of the ancient defensive wall remain.

The sovereign enclosure, surrounded by walls up to 50 cm (20 inches) thick and constructed with small ashlar stones, was accessed via a stone bridge (now replaced by a wooden walkway). The bastion guarding the entrance features a 90 cm (35-inch) thick southern wall. The castle is first documented in 957.

The Chapel of Sant Miquel d'Eramprunyà consists of two architectural styles: a Romanesque apse and presbytery from the 12th century, and a Renaissance nave, choir, and portal added in 1509. Surrounding the chapel are anthropomorphic tombs and a rock inscription attributed to Jaume March I, lord of Eramprunyà, from the 14th century.

== See also ==
- List of Bienes de Interés Cultural in the Province of Barcelona
- List of castles in Spain
