= Castell Vell de Rosanes =

10th-century castle in Catalonia, Spain

Coordinates: 41°27′04″N 1°55′10″E

Castellví Castle
- Castell Vell de Rosanes
- Castellví de Rosanes, Province of Barcelona
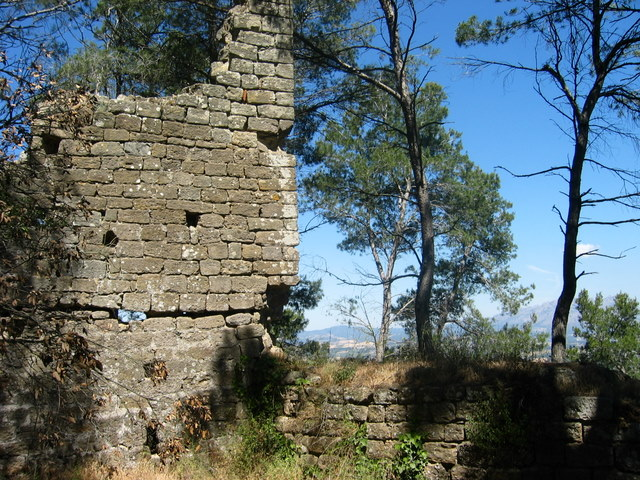

Site information
- Type: Castle

Castellví Castle, also known as the Old Castle of Rosanes (in Catalan: Castell Vell de Rosanes), is a castle located in Castellví de Rosanes in the Baix Llobregat comarca of Catalonia, Spain.

== History ==
The earliest documented reference to the castle dates to 963, when it was recorded as Castrum vetula (Old Castle). A document from the Sant Cugat Monastery confirms land ownership and names Gilelmus as the castle’s lord. At that time, the castles and lands of Castellví de Rosanes and Castellví de la Marca belonged to the same family, known as Castellví or Castellvell, which held significant influence in the comital court and the city of Barcelona.

The name Rosanes derives from the original surname Rodanes, also an early name for the nearby Eramprunyá Castle. The name Castellvell evolved into Castellví, a toponym reflected in both Castellví de Rosanes and Castellví de la Marca. The designation “Old” (vetula) has several theories: it may distinguish the castle from the later-built Rosanes Castle (or Pairet Castle) nearby, refer to Roman foundations beneath the site, or indicate rebuilding after the castle’s destruction by Almanzor in 985. Today, it is also known as Santiago Castle.

Despite its historical significance and archaeological value, Castellví Castle is undergoing severe degradation.

The Castellví barony once encompassed the modern municipalities of Abrera, Castellbisbal, Castellví de Rosanes, Martorell, Sant Andreu de la Barca, Sant Esteve Sesrovires, and Olesa de Montserrat (by 1076). Its origins are tied to the fortification of this region, particularly intense in the late 9th century and early 10th century. During this period, castles such as Masquefa, Gelida, and Subirats emerged in historical records, reflecting a reorganization of the territory that laid the groundwork for early medieval administration and the later process of feudalization.

== Location ==
Situated at an altitude of 369 meters (1,211 feet), Castellví Castle occupies a strategic position overlooking the corridor of the Penedès depression and controlling passage along the Llobregat River toward Barcelona. Its vantage point offers clear views of other castles in the Penedès region, with the smaller Pairet and Rocafort castles, built later, located nearby.

== Santiago Chapel ==
The Santiago Chapel, located in the castle’s basement, is a simple structure with a rectangular nave and a semicircular apse. The apse exterior features Lombard-style blind arches, and the chapel has a lateral entrance with a semicircular arch. A doorway near the nave’s foot, likely added in the 17th or 18th century, is more recent. The chapel includes two windows on the southern side and one in the apse’s center. Currently abandoned, it serves only as a storage space.

== See also ==
- List of Bienes de Interés Cultural in the Province of Barcelona

== Bibliography ==
- Català Roca, Pere (1967–1979). Els castells catalans (in Catalan). Vol. 1. Barcelona: Dalmau. ISBN 978-84-232-0290-4.
