= La Morella =

Spanish mountain

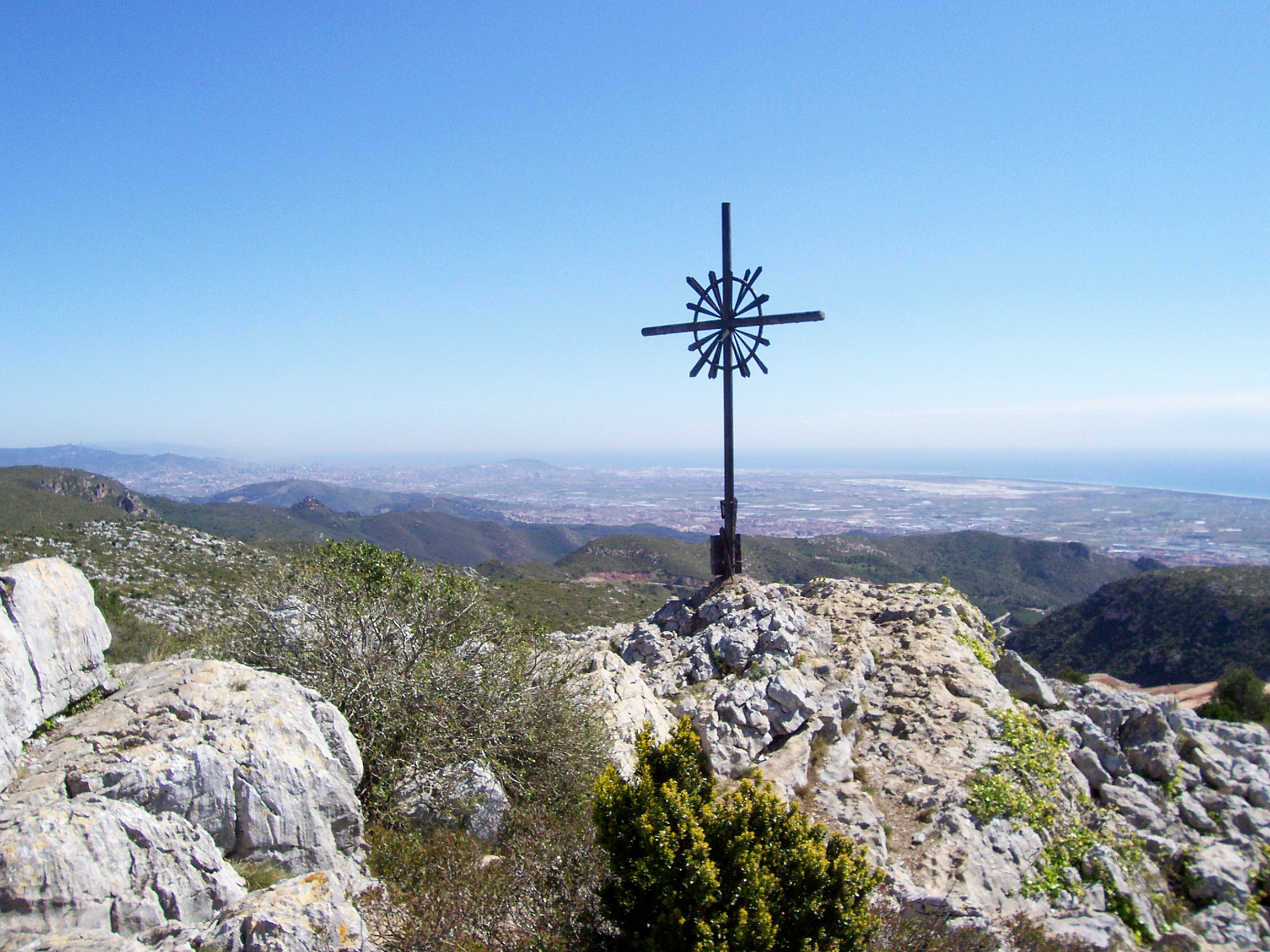
- Cross on La Morella summit

Highest point
- Elevation: 593 m (1,946 ft)
- Listing: Mountains of Catalonia
- Coordinates: 41°17′47.7″N 1°54′55.8″E

Geography
- Location within Catalonia Location within Spain
- Country: Spain
- Community: Catalonia
- County: Garraf
- Parent range: Garraf Massif (Catalan Coastal Range)

Geology
- Mountain type: Karstic

Climbing
- First ascent: Unknown
- Easiest route: From Castelldefels

La Morella or Morella is a mountain located in Begues municipality, Catalonia, Spain. It has an elevation of 593 metres above sea level.

It is the second highest point of the Garraf Massif, Catalan Coastal Range.

== The Morella wind ==
'Morella' is also the name of a wind. Vent de Morella, llevant després d'ella (The wind from Morella is followed by wind from the east). In certain areas close to Barcelona 'Morella' refers to the southern wind coming from the area of this mountain, but in areas closer to Aragon, like Cervera, it refers to the wind coming from the area of the city of Morella, Al matí Morella i a la tarda Tramuntana (In the morning Morella wind and in the afternoon northern wind).
