= Massís de l'Ardenya =

Massif in the Costa Brava region, Catalonia, Spain

Ardenya Massif
- Massís de Cadiretes
- View from the highest point of the massif, Puig de les Cadiretes

Highest point
- Elevation: 518 m (1,699 ft)
- Coordinates: 41°45′0″N 2°55′0″E

Geography
- Location within Catalonia
- Location: Selva, Baix Empordà, Gironès; Catalonia
- Parent range: Catalan Coastal Range

Geology
- Mountain type: Granite

Climbing
- First ascent: Unknown
- Easiest route: La Bisbal d'Empordà

The Massís de l'Ardenya, also known as Massís de Cadiretes after the main range in the mountainous area, is a massif in the Costa Brava region, Catalonia, Spain.

The Ardenya Massif is part of the Catalan Coastal Range. The highest point is 519 m high Puig de les Cadiretes or Puig de Cadiretes. Other important summits are Montagut (505 m), Montllor (470 m), Ruïra (444 m), and Puig de les Cols (416 m).

== Geography ==
The Ardenya Massif is a quite compact mountainous terrain, granitic between the craggy portion near the sea and the forested plains to the west, the highest point of which is Puig de Cadiretes (519 metres). The mountain ranges run broadly in a north-east / south-west direction and consist mostly of granite rock.

The ranges meet the sea between Sant Feliu de Guixols and Lloret de Mar, running westwards far as Caldes de Malavella. Most mountains are covered in occasionally dense forests of cork oak, holm oak, pine and Mediterranean shrub. The valleys are irrigated by seasonal mountain streams subject to the typically Mediterranean climate. However, the nature of the terrain favours up welling of water throughout the year, along with humidity and precipitation caused by the screen effect of the mountains before the marine winds. The botanic species, as well as the fauna show some Eurosiberian and Atlantic influences.

== Protected area ==
The l'Ardenya-Cadiretes massif is a natural area that occupies almost the whole of Tossa de Mar municipality and part of Sant Feliu, Santa Cristina d'Aro, Llagostera, Vidreres, Caldes de Malavella and Lloret de Mar. A particularly rugged section of the coast, more than six kilometres in length, is also a protected area.

== Subranges ==
The Cadiretes Massif is the main range of the Ardenya Massif. Other ranges are the L'Ardenya Massif proper, Carcaixells d'en Dalmau, Muntanyes de Llobatera, Muntanya d'en Bonet, Serra de les Comes and Serra d'Aiguafina.

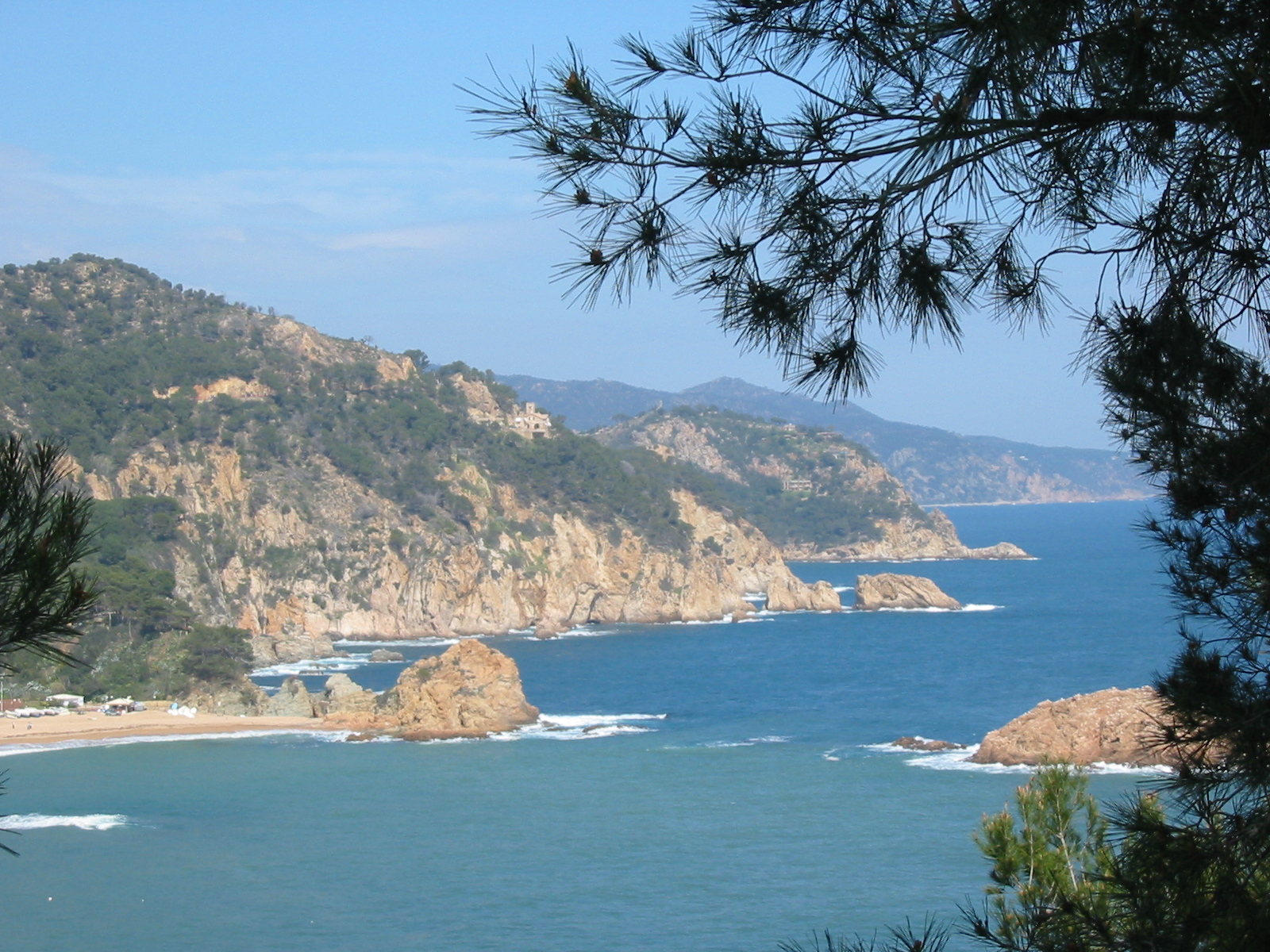
The rugged shores where the mountains meet the Mediterranean Sea.

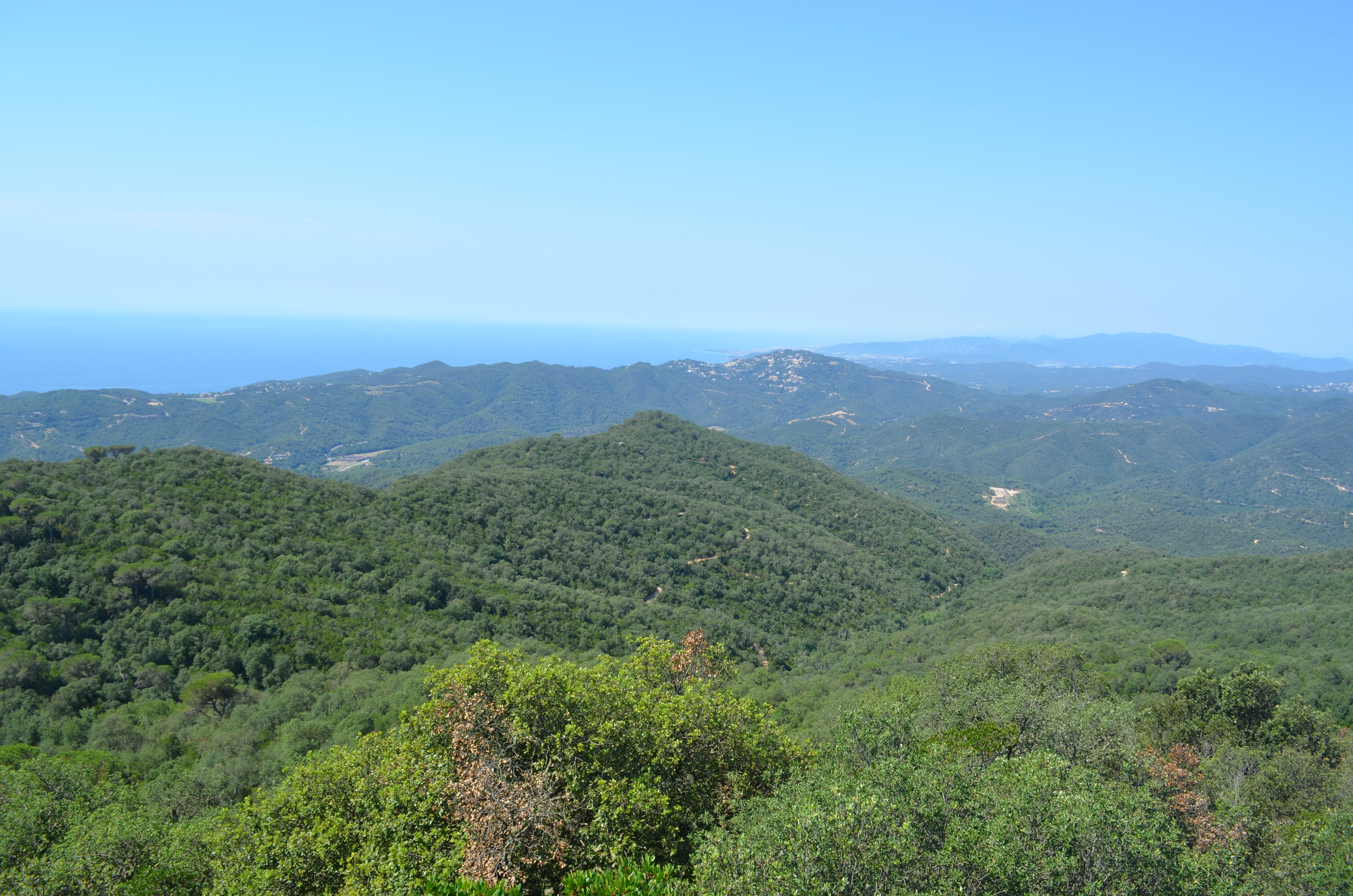
View of the 470 m high Montllor Petit.

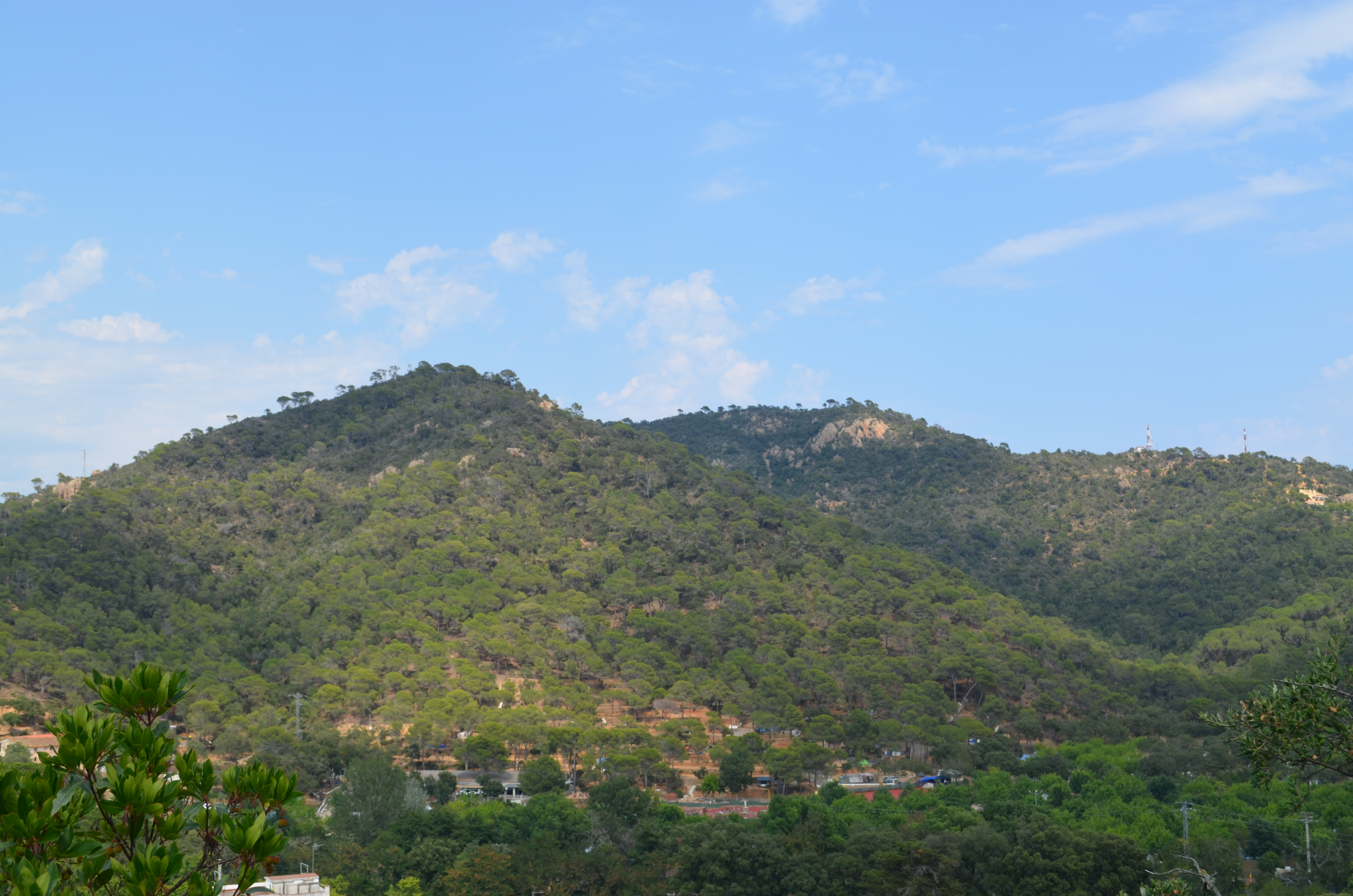
View of the Puig Nau above Tossa de Mar.

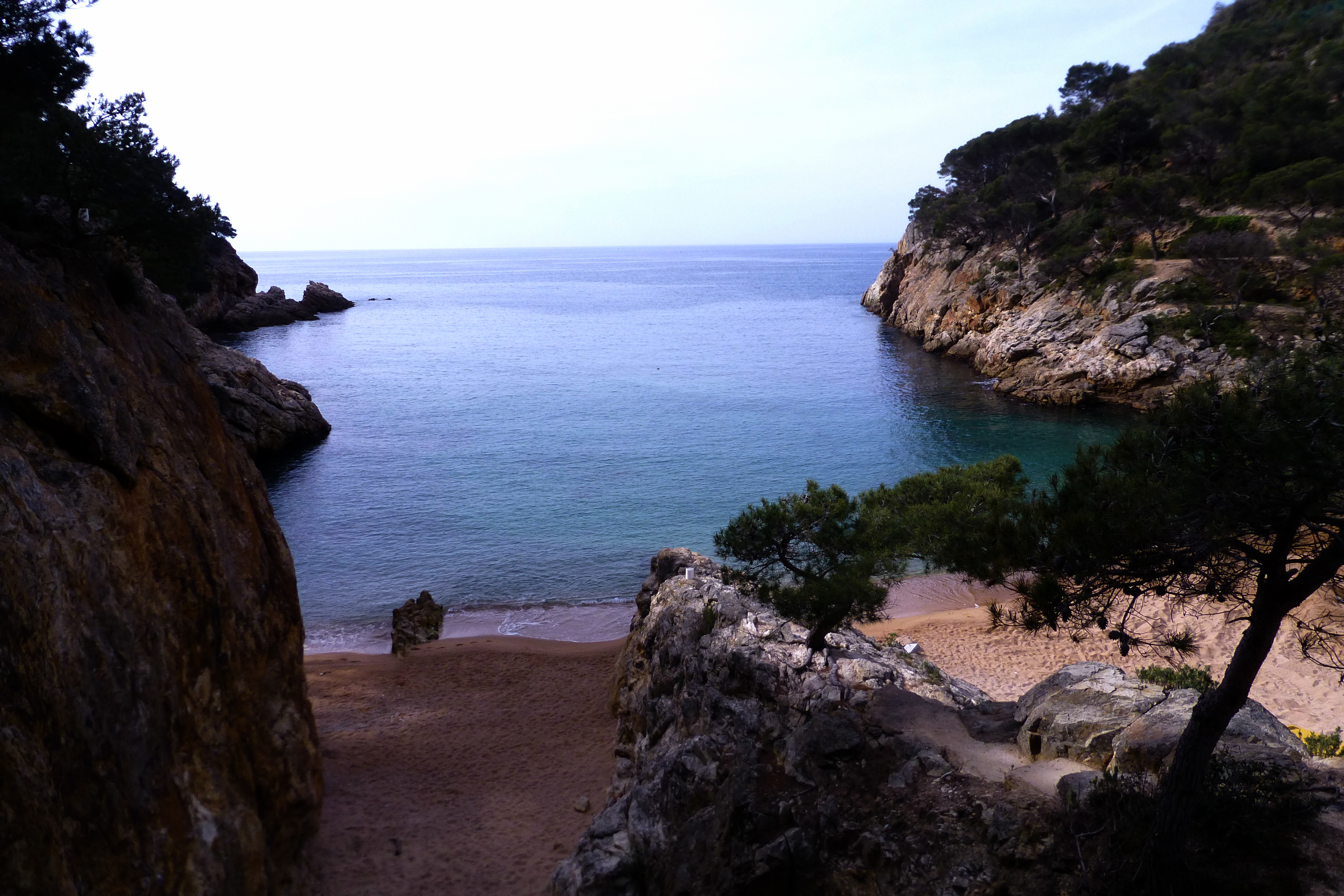
View of the Cala Pola.

== See also ==
- Costa Brava
