= Vallcarca, Sitges =

Abandoned coastal settlement in Garraf Massif, Catalonia, Spain

Coordinates: 41°14′N 1°52′E

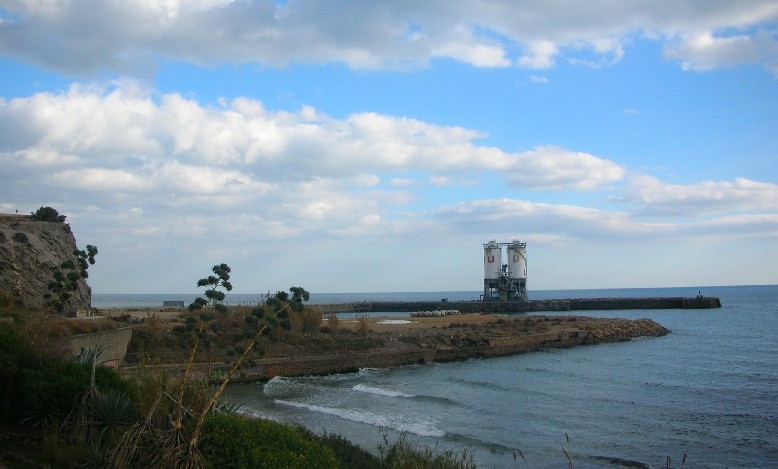
View of Vallcarca harbor

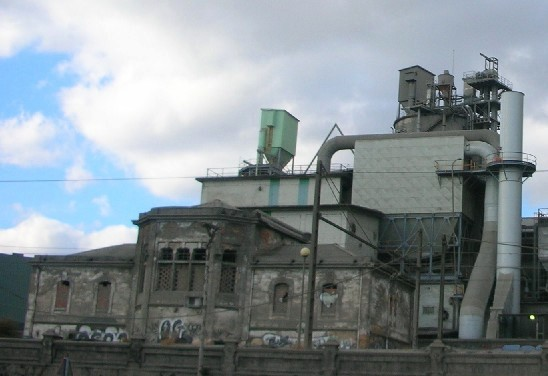
Vallcarca; abandoned railway station.

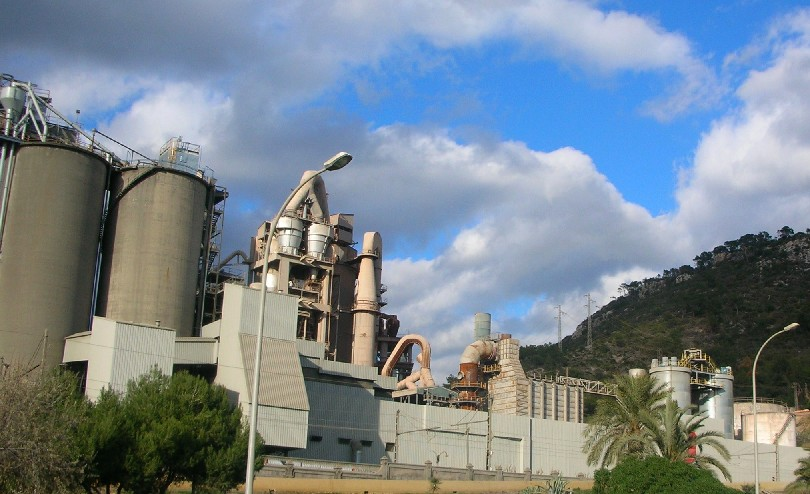
View of the cement factory.

Vallcarca is an abandoned coastal settlement in the Garraf Massif, Catalonia, Spain. It is administered by the Sitges municipality.

Although most of the area is surrounded by the Garraf Natural Park, a highly-polluting cement factory near the abandoned railroad station is still active exploiting the nearby quarries for cement production.

== History ==
Vallcarca was originally settled by a small group of workers at the Fradera cement plant and nearby quarries. The seaport was built in 1913 to ship the plant's products. Merchant ships carried cement across the Mediterranean Sea to the Balearic Islands and other places in the Iberian Peninsula's Mediterranean coast. Some return trips brought coal from mines in Pola de Laviana, also owned by Fradera. Susqueda and Sau dams and some buildings in the University of Barcelona were built using Vallcarca's cement.

In 1937, during the Spanish Civil War, aircraft belonging to the Francoist expeditionary air forces bombed Vallcarca. At that time it was an important military target owing to the cement plant and its harbor which connected the town with Mallorca.

The town housed workers in the Vallcarca industrial and port facilities, as well as from the Renfe train station which was the only means of transport for the workers and their families. There was a problem with the cement related pollution which covered the whole area in thick white dust. The cement company imported machinery from Germany to remove the dust from the air, but the machinery soon broke down. Subsequently, in the second half of the 20th century, many of the younger inhabitants of the town refused to work in the near-slavery conditions of Vallcarca and looked for work in nearby Sitges and beyond.

Today the Uniland company administers Vallcarca port. The train station was closed in 1994 and the old workers' houses are abandoned.

Vallcarca port was particularly active during the expansion of the Barcelona harbor. Twelve million tons of rock from the Garraf Massif were used for the project.

Some people visit Vallcarca during the summer, as its beach is still in a pristine state, but the leftover dust from the quarries during windy days can be unpleasant. The port is used exclusively for industrial purposes, as all the workers come from Sitges or elsewhere.
