= Olesa de Bonesvalls =

- Municipality
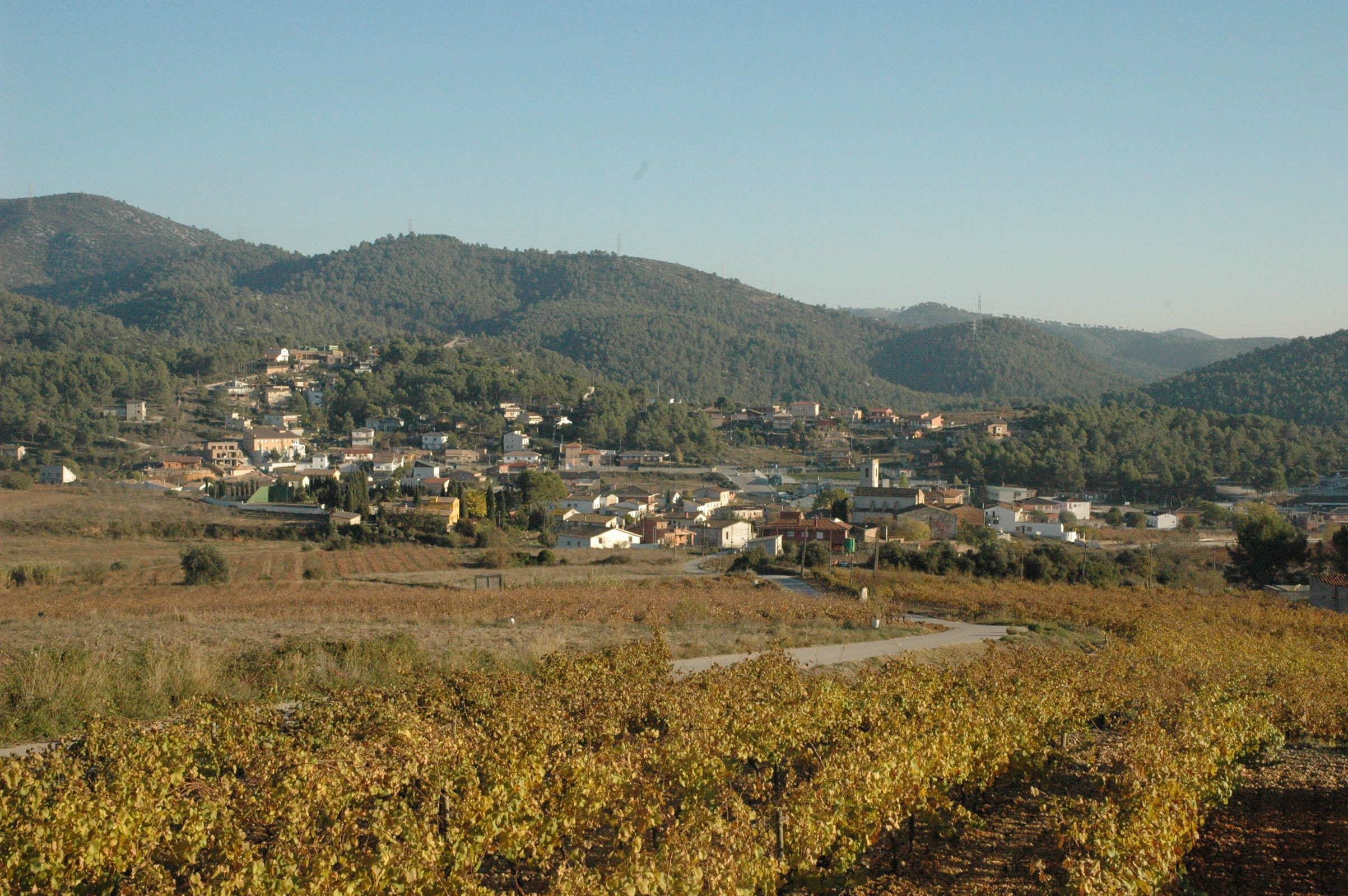

- Flag Coat of arms

- Location in Catalonia Olesa de Bonesvalls (Spain)
- Coordinates: 41°21′N 1°51′E
- Country: Spain
- Community: Catalonia
- Province: Barcelona
- Comarca: Alt Penedès

Government
  - Mayor: Josep Ma. Tillo Bages (2015)

Area
  - Total: 30.8 km^{2} (11.9 sq mi)
- Elevation: 265 m (869 ft)

Population (2025-01-01)
  - Total: 2,135
  - Density: 69.3/km^{2} (180/sq mi)
- Demonym(s): Olesà, olesana
- Website: www.olesadebonesvalls.net

Olesa de Bonesvalls (Catalan pronunciation: [uˈlɛzə ðə ˌβɔnəzˈβaʎs]) is a village and municipality in the Alt Penedès comarca in Catalonia, Spain. Until 1990 it was included in Garraf comarca.

It is located in the Garraf natural park, and includes its highest peak Montau, at 653m. The land is stony karst with many caves, notably "Avenc de l'Esquerrà" at 348 m, the deepest in Spain.

Its most notable building is Hospital de Cervelló, a fortified hostel complex for travellers dating from 1262, which has remained in good condition.

Its economy is based mainly around agriculture, predominantly vineyards and orchards, and small local industry.

Its population was 1,735 in 2014. The municipality is traversed by the road between the towns of Avinyonet del Penedès and Gavà.

== History ==
In 1262 Olesa de Bonesvalls hosted a two-floor hospital whose architecture reproduced the Italian infirmaries of Fossanova, Viterbo and Casamari. Olesa was one of the oldest Spanish hospitals, along with Coll de Balaguer and Vich.

== Demography ==
1900	1930	1950	1970	1986	2014
643	513	389	372	329	1735
