= Can Sunyer del Palau =

Residential area in Catalonia, Spain

Coordinates: 41.458514°N 1.941619°E

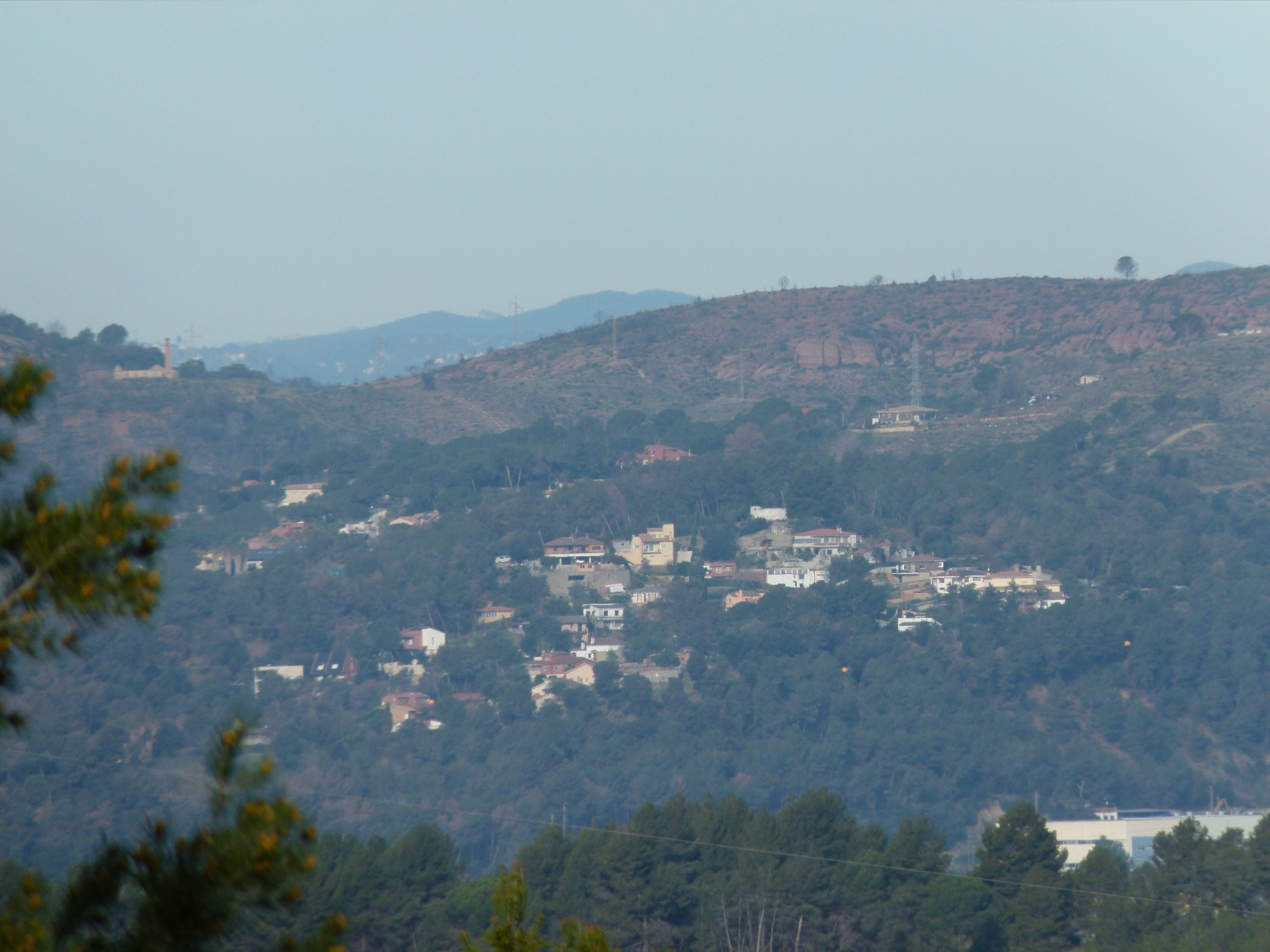
Can Sunyer del Palau

Can Sunyer del Palau is a residential area within the hills of the municipality of the Catalan town Castellví de Rosanes (Spain). It counted 434 inhabitants in 2005.
