= Castellví de Rosanes =

- Municipality
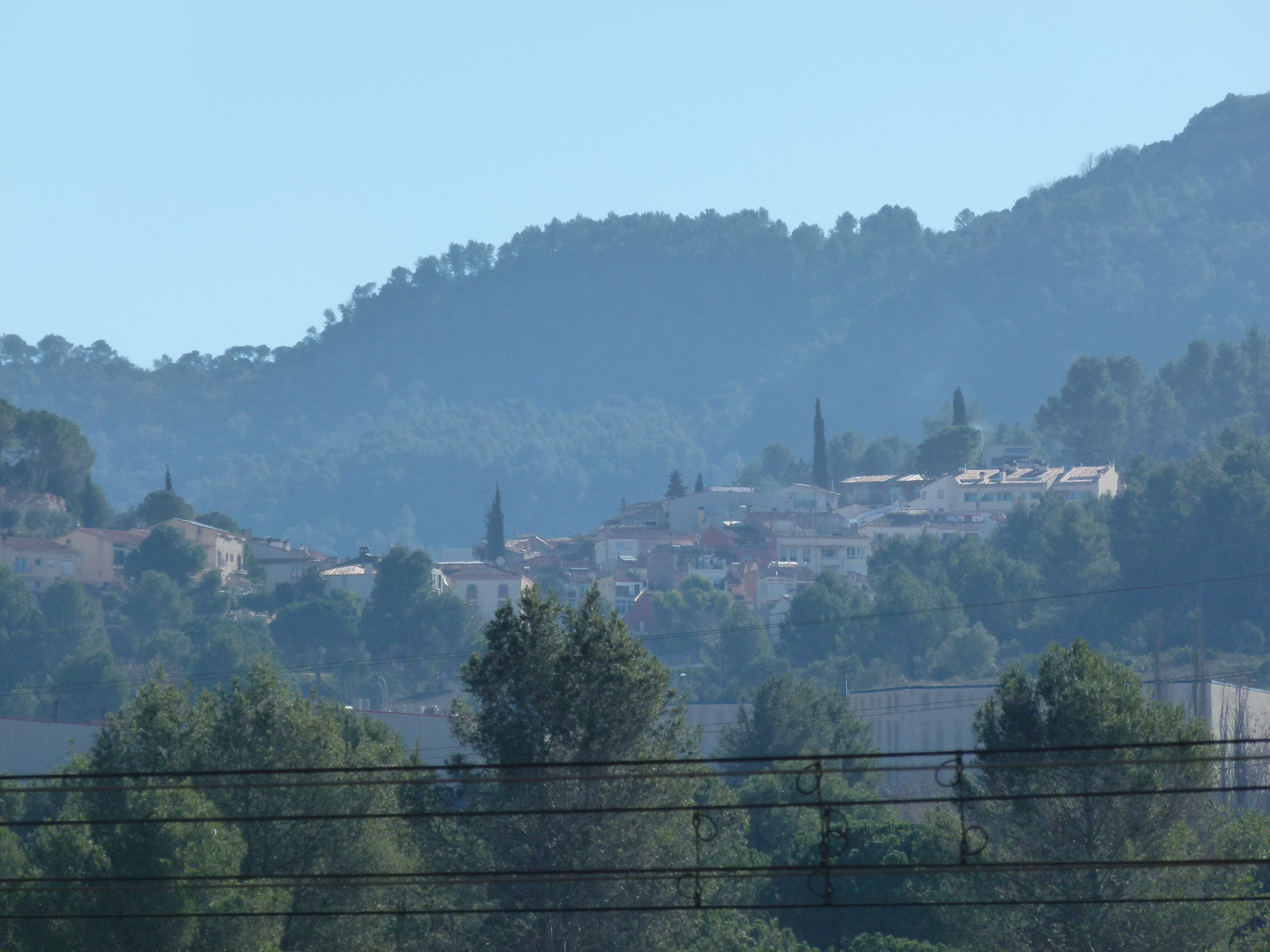
- Castellví de Rosanes

- Coat of arms

- Location in the Province of Barcelona Location in Catalonia Location in Spain
- Coordinates: 41°27′01″N 1°53′58″E
- Country: Spain
- Community: Catalonia
- Province: Barcelona
- Comarca: Baix Llobregat

Government
  - Mayor: Joan Carles Almirall Sánchez (2015)

Area
  - Total: 16.4 km^{2} (6.3 sq mi)

Population (2025-01-01)
  - Total: 2,171
  - Density: 132/km^{2} (343/sq mi)
- Website: www.castellviderosanes.cat

Castellví de Rosanes (Old Catalan for 'Old Castle of Rosanes'; Catalan pronunciation: [kəsˌteʎˈβi ðə ruˈzanəs]) is a municipality in the comarca of the Baix Llobregat, in the province of Barcelona, Catalonia, Spain. As of 2016, the municipality had 1,807 inhabitants and was 16.4 km^{2}, which includes the neighbourhoods of Els Àngels, Can Sunyer del Palau, Miralles, El Taió and Valldaina. Castellví de Rosanes is located between Martorell and Gelida, which ones are bigger cities both connected with Renfe.

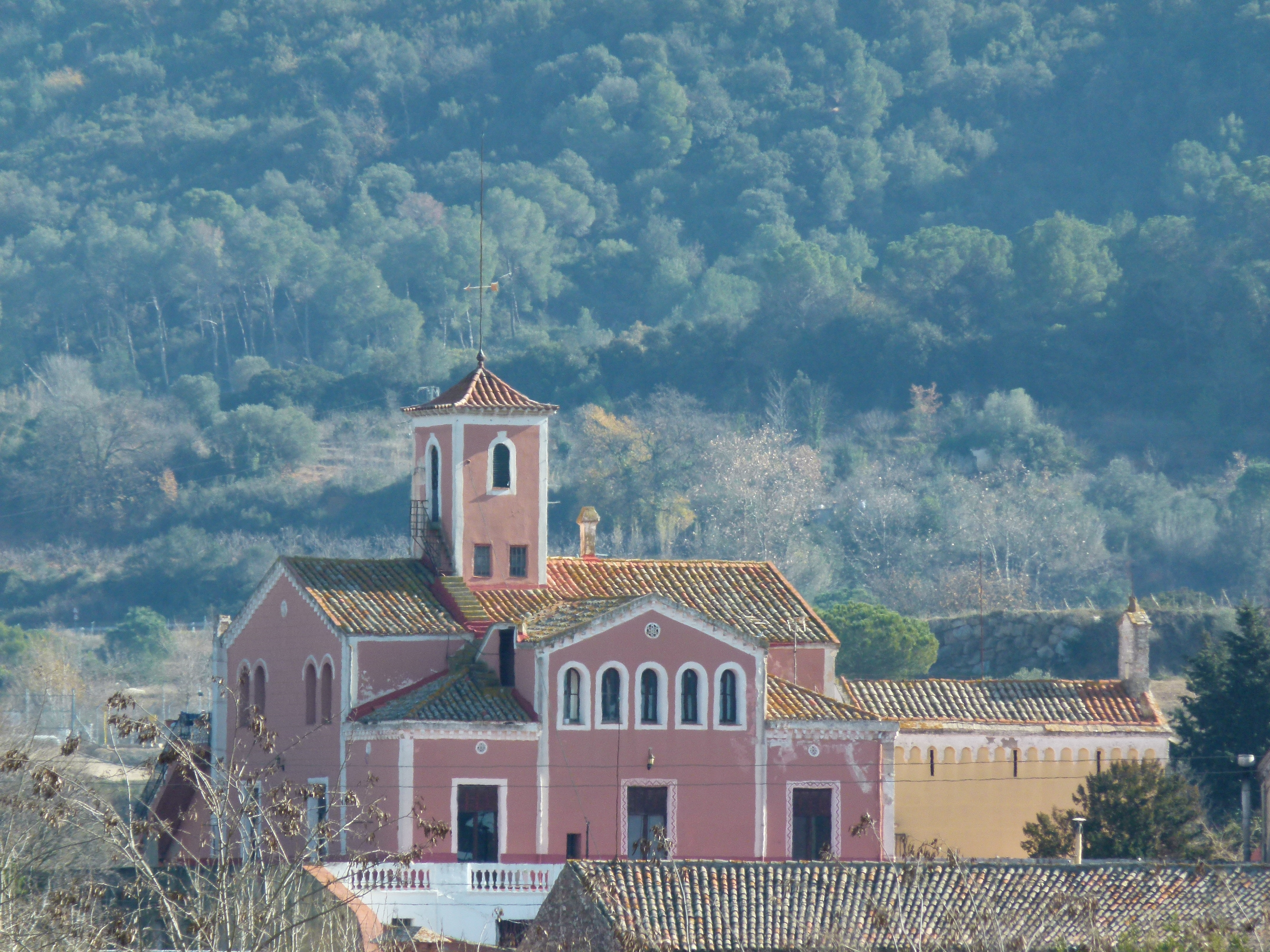
Ca n'Abat, Castellví

== See also ==
- Castell Vell de Rosanes
