= Diari de Vilanova =

- Type: Weekly newspaper
- Founder(s): Josep Pers Ricard
- Founded: 1 August 1850 (as Diaro de Villanueva)
- Language: Catalan
- Headquarters: Vilanova i la Geltrú
- Website: diaridevilanova.cat

Diari de Vilanova (DV) is a weekly newspaper published in Garraf, Catalonia, as well as a news website. It is sold in Garraf, Barcelona, Vilafranca del Penedès, and Baix Penedès. The newspaper sells approximately 7,500 copies a week and has 1,680 subscribers.

It was founded in Vilanova i la Geltrú on 1 August 1850 by Josep Pers Ricard, as a small daily newspaper named Diario de Villanueva, published in Spanish. In 1920 it became weekly, but was only published irregularly during the Spanish Civil War of the late 1930s and its aftermath when newspapers were repressed in Francoist Spain. In 1942 it received permission to resume publishing, and in 1976, during the transition to democracy, it changed to its current Catalan name. In 2015, experiencing declining circulation and profitability, the newspaper was bought by Edicions Comarca 17, changed its name to DV, and launched a new website.
