= Religion in Barcelona =

Religion in Barcelona
1. Catholicism (53.2%)
2. Atheist (21.8%)
3. Indifferent/Non-believer (9.5%)
4. Agnostic (9.7%)
5. Other denominations and religions (3.9%)
6. Did not answer (1.9%)

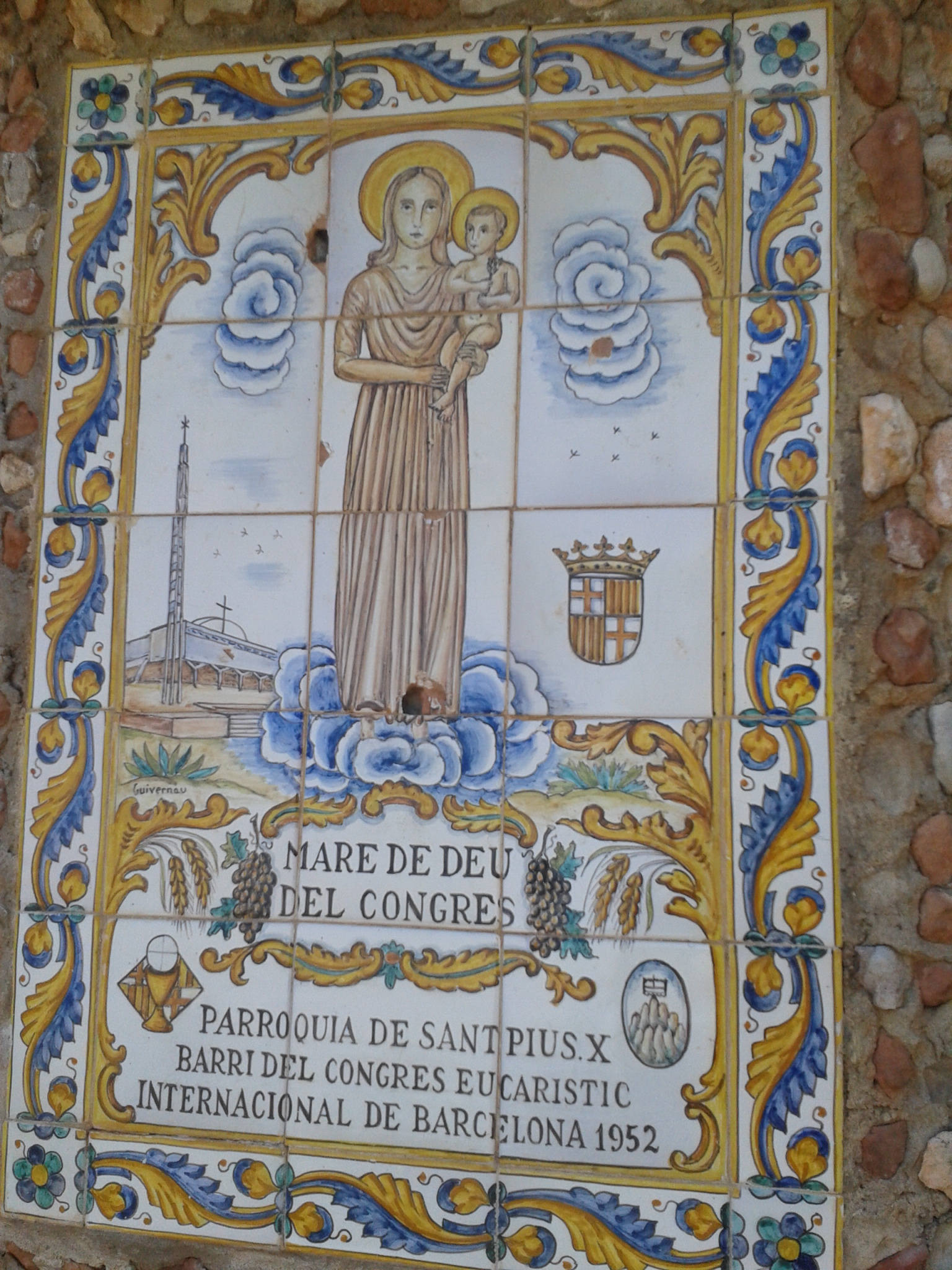
Decorated tiles in Camí dels Degotalls, Montserrat mountain, Catalonia.

The most widely practiced religion in Barcelona is Catholic Christianity but secularization is strong, in line with the Spanish and other Western European trends. After Christianity, Islam is the second largest religion. The city also has the largest Jewish community in Spain, with an estimated 3,500 Jewish residents.

== Catholicism ==
In 2011, data from a survey of religious practices showed that 49.5% of Barcelona's residents identified themselves as Catholic. This number dropped to 45% within the demographic of young people between the ages of 14 - 25.

In 2019, a survey (data size of 587 respondents) by Centro de Investigaciones Sociológicas showed that 53.2% of residents in Barcelona identified themselves as Catholic (9.9% practising Catholics, 43.3% non-practising Catholics).

== Judaism ==
There are an estimated 3,500 Jewish residents in Barcelona.

== Islam ==
In 2014, 322,698 people in the province of Barcelona identified as Muslims, including 217,405 immigrants and 105,293 Spanish citizens.

=== Muslim pupils in schools of Barcelona ===
The province of Barcelona has more than 70,000 pupils from Muslim background and more than 350,000 from a Christian background. In Barcelona, 90% of students that identify as Muslim do not have religious classes and that 90% of teachers of Islamic religion are unemployed. Just over 55% of Muslims in Barcelona identify as non-practising.

=== Mosques in Barcelona ===
There are 26 Muslim places of worship in Barcelona. Barcelona endorses model oratories around the city, a formula implemented by the socialist governments that the Socialists' Party of Catalonia defends. In Barcelona, there were 126 oratories in 2015 compared to 71 in 2004, showing considerable growth.

== See also ==
- Religion in Catalonia
- Religion in Spain
