= Cubelles =

- Municipality
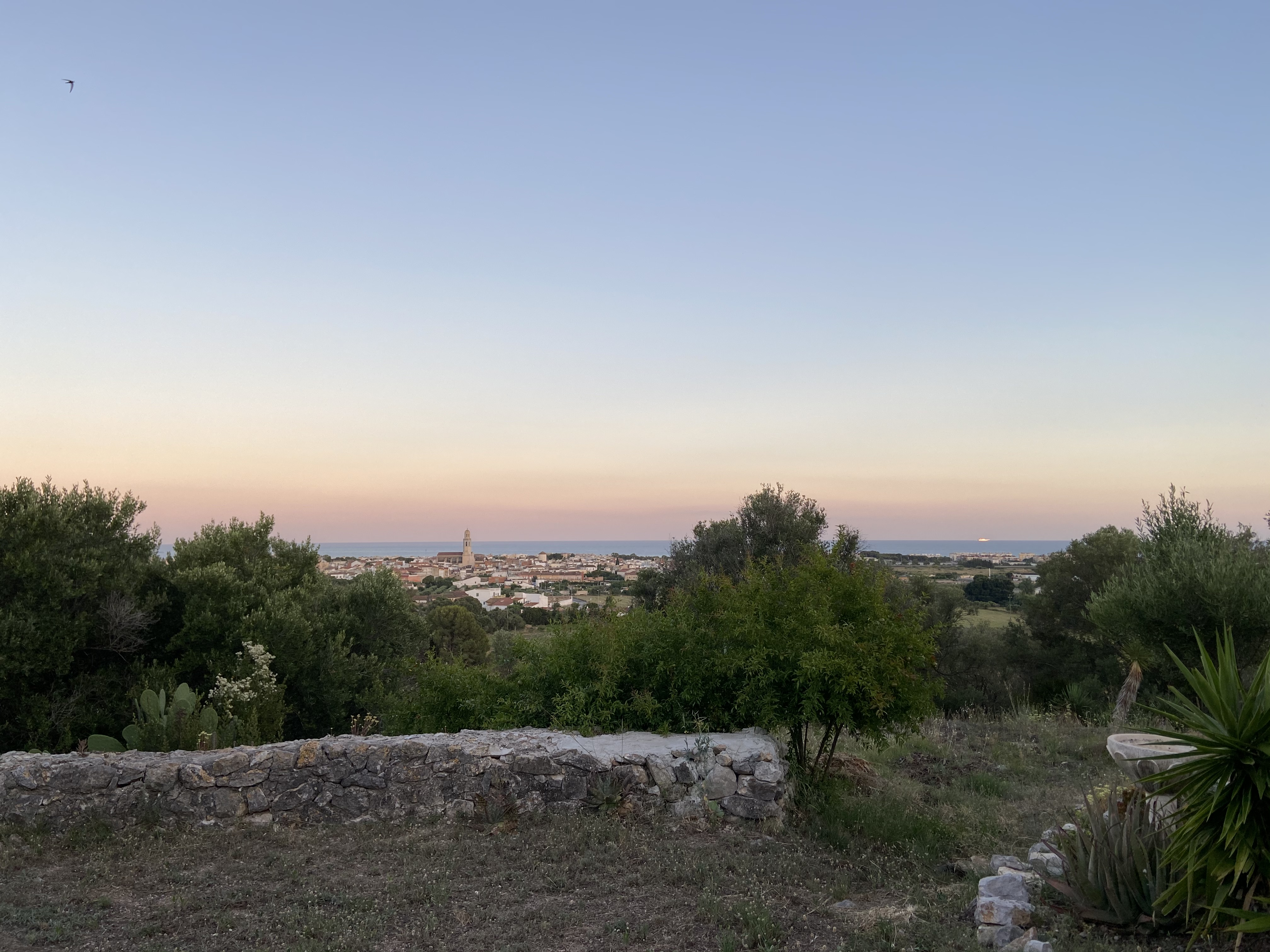
- Cubelles, 2020

- Flag Coat of arms

- Location in Catalonia Cubelles (Spain)
- Coordinates: 41°12′26″N 1°40′26.4″E
- Country: Spain
- Community: Catalonia
- Province: Barcelona
- Comarca: Garraf

Government
  - Mayor: Rosa Montserrat Fonoll Ventura (2015)

Area
  - Total: 13.5 km^{2} (5.2 sq mi)
- Elevation: 12 m (39 ft)

Population (2025-01-01)
  - Total: 17,673
  - Density: 1,310/km^{2} (3,390/sq mi)
- Postal code: 08880
- Website: www.cubelles.cat

Cubelles (Catalan pronunciation: [kuˈβeʎəs]) is a municipality in Catalonia, in the province of Barcelona, Spain. It is situated in the comarca of Garraf. It has a population of 17,648 (2025).

== Culture ==
A 2005 film by the Spanish director Paco Plaza, "Cuento de navidad" (The Christmas Tale), part of the film series Películas para no dormir (Films to Keep You Awake), was set in the town.
