= La Plana Novella =

Buddhist monastery

Coordinates: 41°17′24″N 1°51′31″E

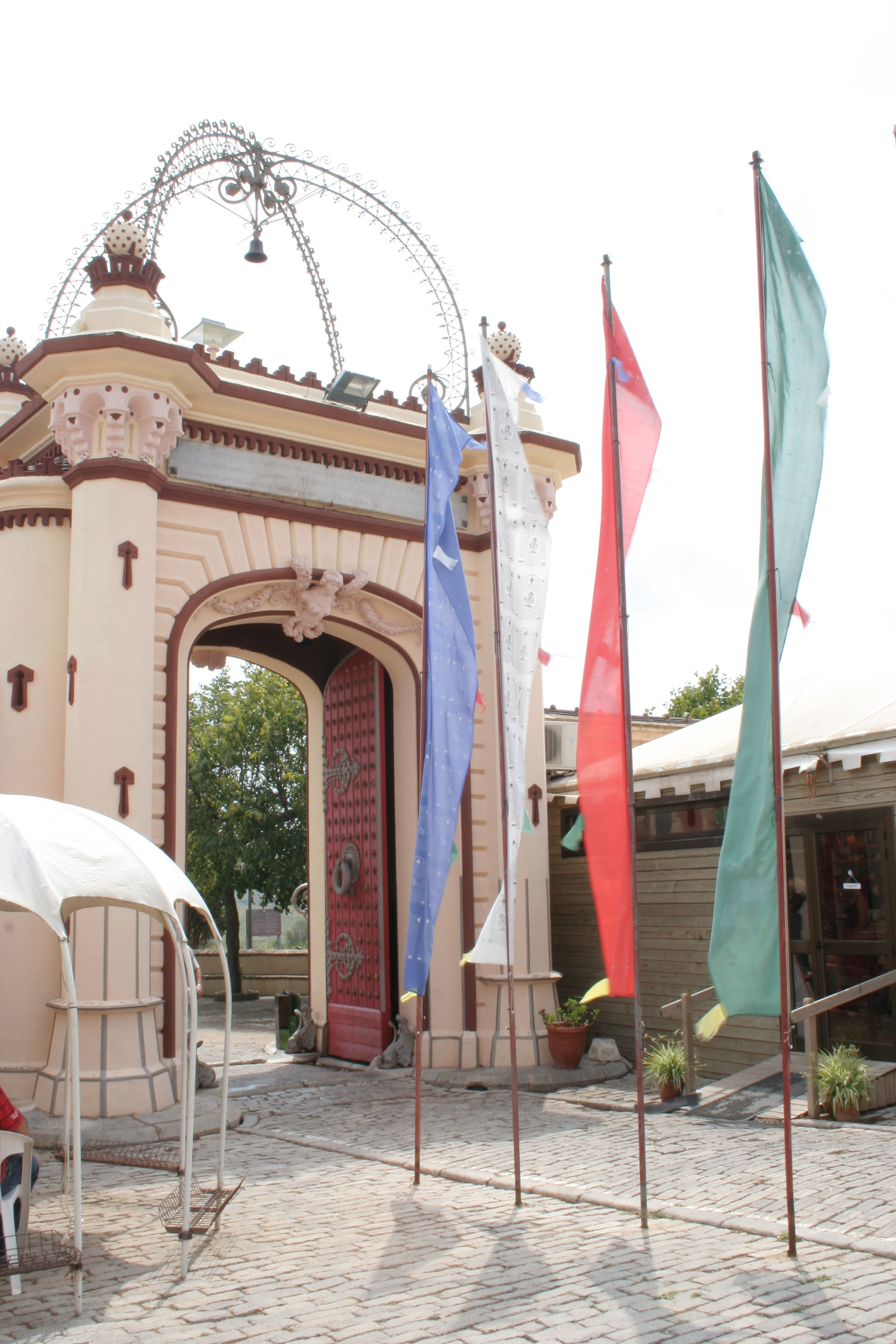
The entrance to the Buddhist monastery

Plana Novella (Catalan: La Plana Novella) is an old country estate and village located on a small plain in the middle of the Garraf Massif National Park, about three kilometers to the east of Jafra and within the municipal boundary of the town of Olivella, Spain. It is notable for being in an almost uninhabited rural area, despite being about half an hour's drive from Barcelona. It is also the location of a Tibetan Buddhist retreat.

== History ==
In 1885, the estate was acquired by Pere Domenech i Grau who built a large mansion, Palau Novella (Novella Palace), on it. Ten years later he went bankrupt and the estate was taken over by the Spanish government and reclassified as an agricultural colony.

The architectural style of the mansion is eclectic. It can be described as a "castle of props", as if it were the set of a theatre. The most original stylistic building of la Plana Novella is the courtyard in the Gaudi style, but one of the most characteristic and eye-catching elements is the lavatory, known as "the throne".

Rural depopulation has left many farmhouses in the area deserted, and the Park is almost uninhabited. However the area has seen a recent growth in second homes, and tourism is growing in importance in the village.

Since its foundation in 1996, the Sakya Tashi Ling Tibetan Buddhist monastery and community has been located in Plana Novella.
