= Catalan Coastal Range =

System of mountain ranges in Spain

Coordinates: 41°40′50″N 02°33′20″E

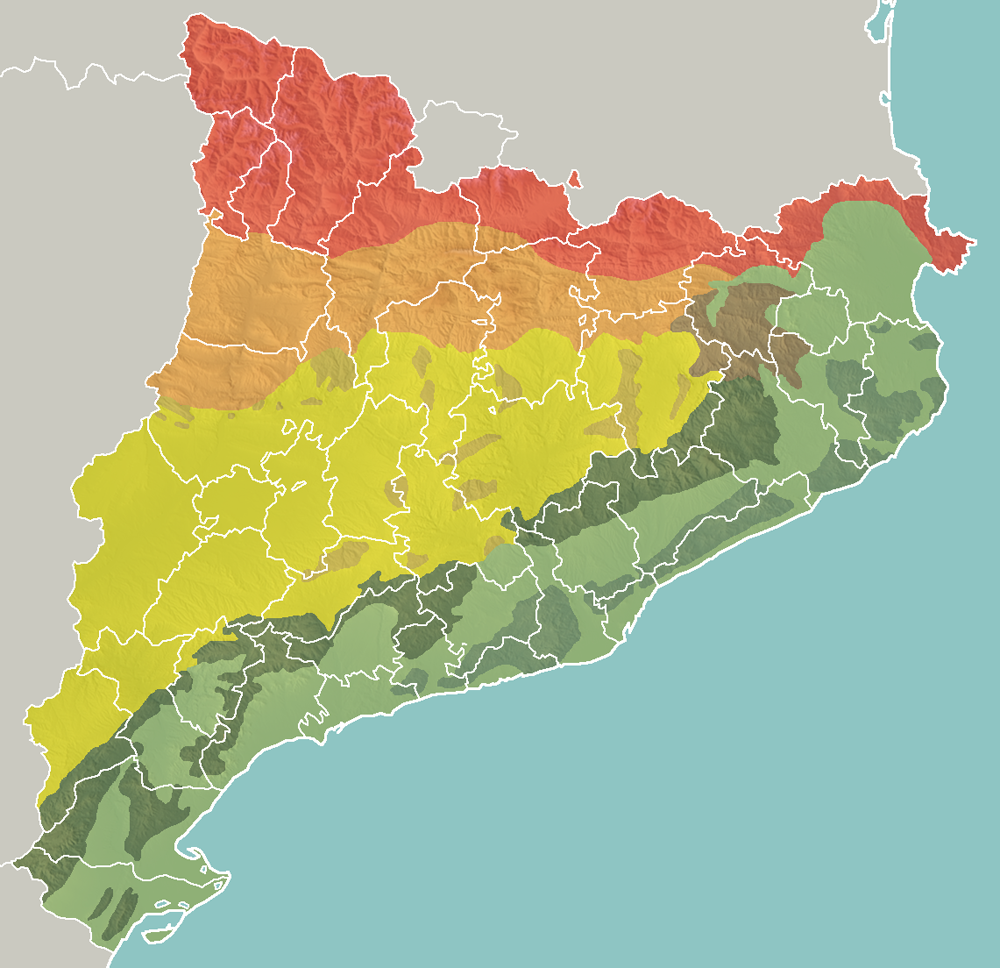
Geomorphologic map of Catalonia: Pyrenees; Pre-Pyrenees; Catalan Central Depression; Smaller mountain ranges of the Central Depression; Catalan Transversal Range; Catalan Pre-Coastal Range; Catalan Coastal Range; Catalan Coastal Depression and other coastal and pre-coastal plains

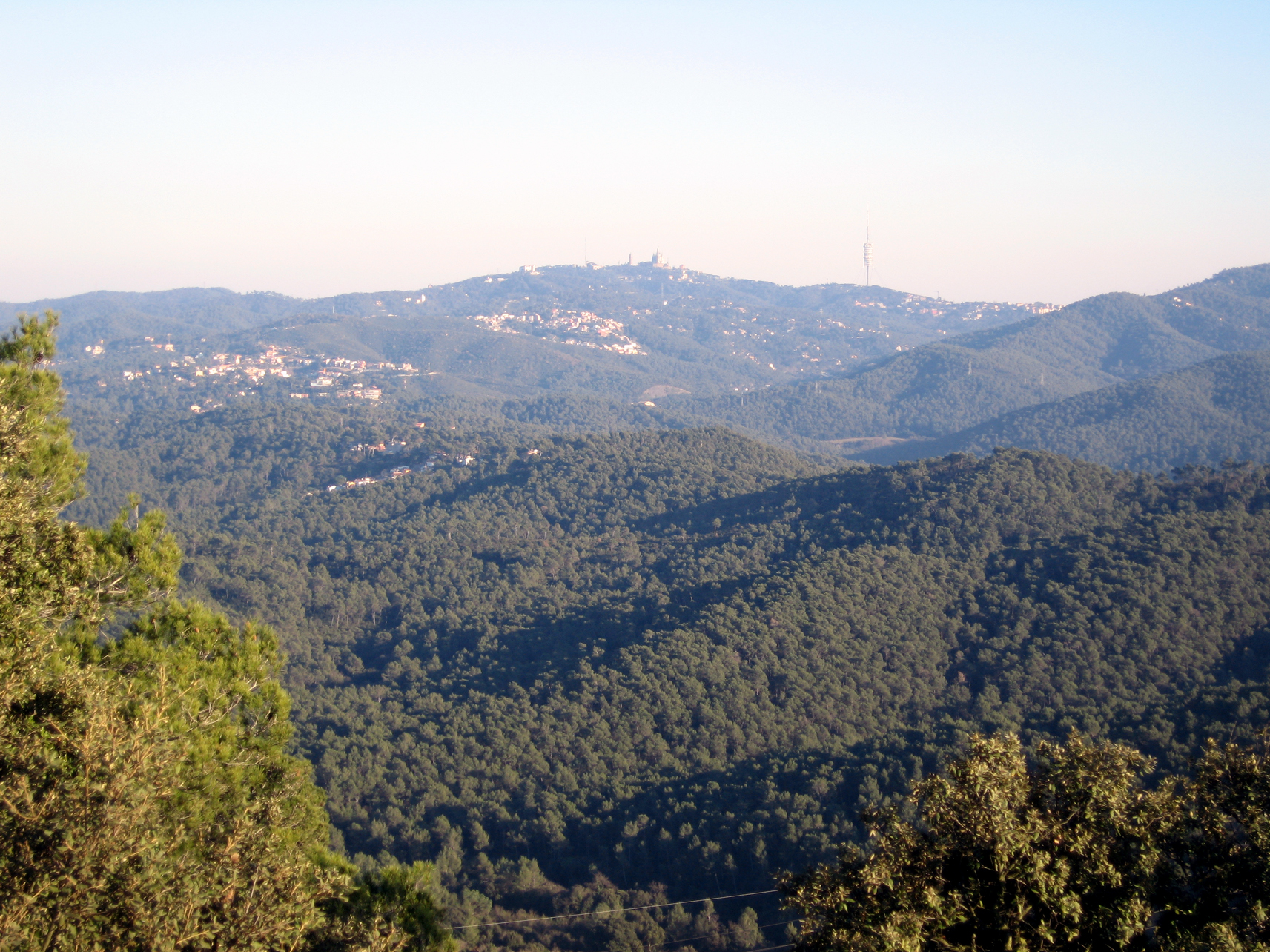
Serra de Collserola, seen from Puig Madrona towards Tibidabo

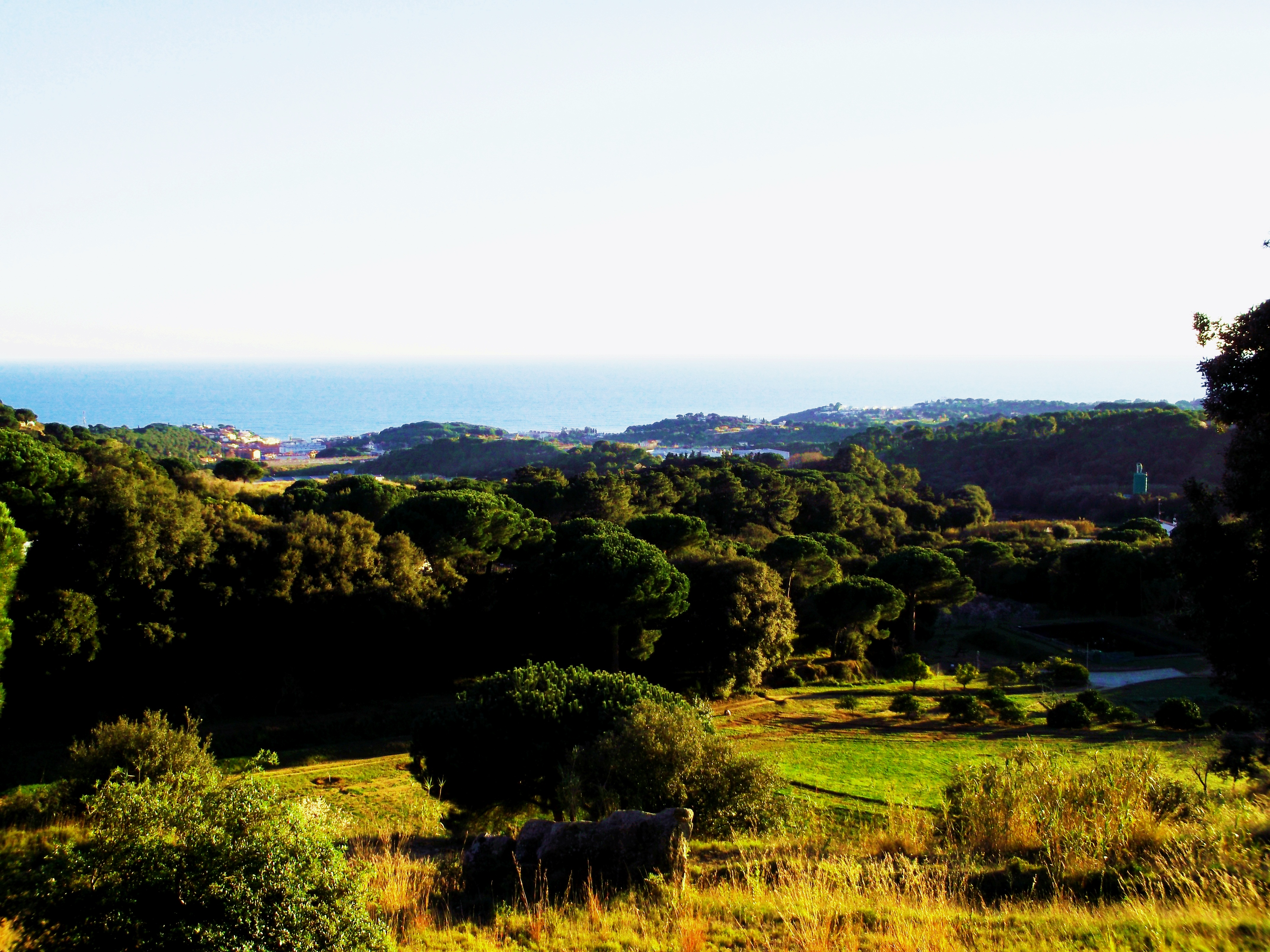
Canet de Mar

The Catalan Coastal Range (Catalan: Serralada Litoral Catalana, IPA: [sərəˈlaðə lituˈɾal kətəˈlanə]) is a system of mountain ranges running parallel to the Mediterranean Sea coast in Catalonia, Spain. It is part of the Catalan Mediterranean System. Its main axis runs between the Foix River and the Roses Gulf and the average altitude is around 500 m. The highest point is 763 m at the Montnegre.

== Mountain ranges ==
From North to South:

- Montgrí
- Gavarres
- Massís de l'Ardenya
- Serra de Marina
- Montnegre Massif
- Serra del Corredor
- Serra de Sant Mateu
- Serra de la Conreria
- Serra de Collserola
- Massís del Garraf

Further south there are certain coastal mountain ranges like los Dedalts, Moles del Taix and Serra de la Mar in the Tivissa-Vandellòs Mountains and the Serra del Montsià that are included in the Catalan Pre-Coastal Range owing to the geological continuity with that range despite their seaside location.

== Ecology ==
There are a few protected areas in the Catalan Coastal Range, like Parc Natural del Montnegre i el Corredor, Parc de Collserola and Parc Natural del Garraf. At the same time though there are several areas subject to severe land degradation, owing mainly to stone quarrying, rubbish dumps and urban sprawl.

== See also ==
- Tibidabo
