= Begues =

- Municipality
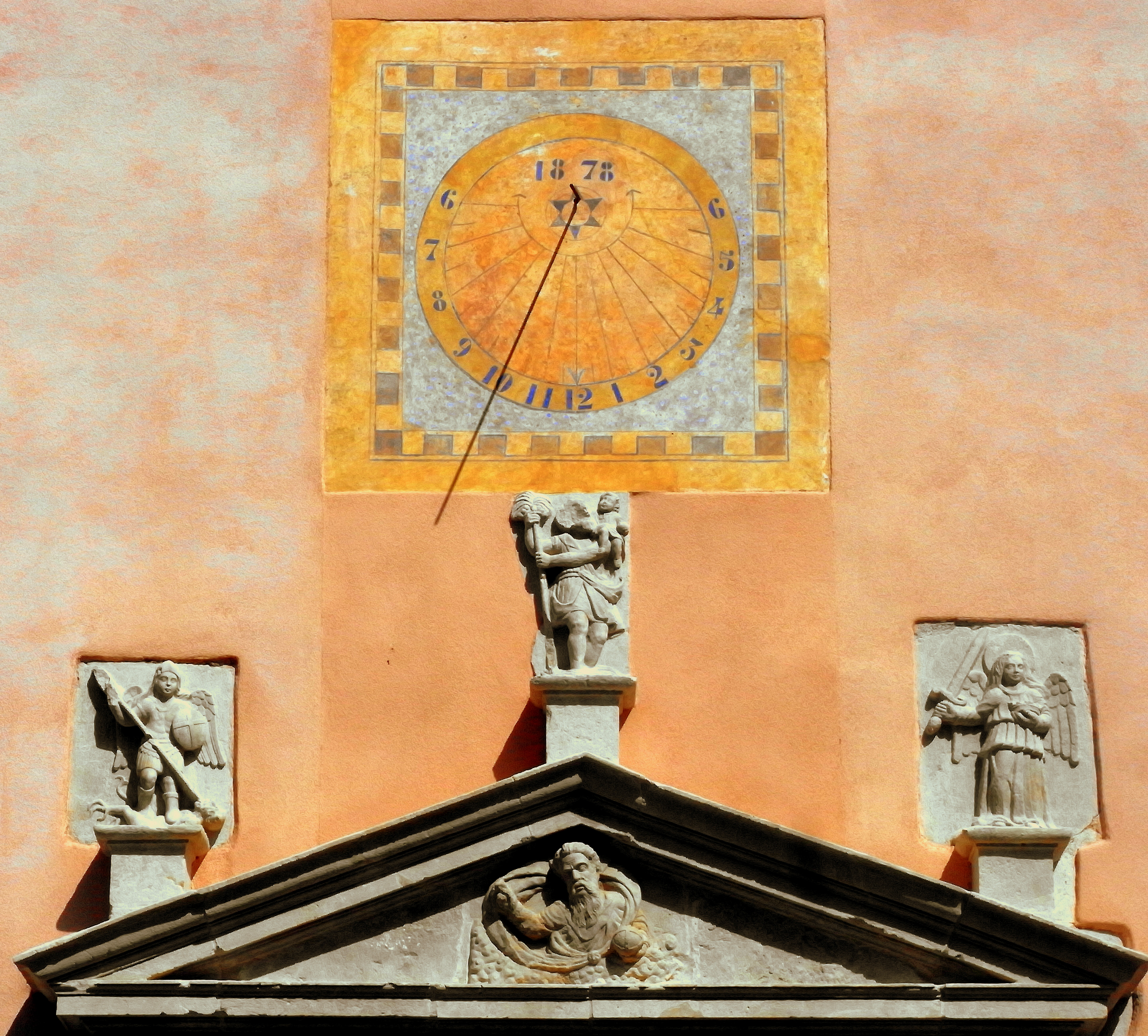
- Detail of the door of the church of St. Christopher, Begues

- Flag Coat of arms

- Location in Catalonia Begues (Spain)
- Coordinates: 41.334°N 1.922°E
- Country: Spain
- Community: Catalonia
- Province: Barcelona
- Comarca: Baix Llobregat

Government
  - Mayor: Mercè Esteve Pi (2015)

Area
  - Total: 50.4 km^{2} (19.5 sq mi)
- Elevation: 399 m (1,309 ft)

Population (2025-01-01)
  - Total: 7,561
  - Density: 150/km^{2} (389/sq mi)
- Demonym(s): Beguetà, beguetana
- Website: begues.cat

Begues (Catalan pronunciation: [ˈbeɣəs]) is a municipality in the comarca of Baix Llobregat in Catalonia, Spain. It is situated in the south-west of the comarca, and its municipal territory covers most of the Garraf massif including the peaks of el Montau (658 m) and La Morella (594 m).

Begues is an important tourist centre, and it is connected with Avinyonet del Penedès and with Gavà by a local road.

== Demography ==
1900	1930	1950	1970	1986	2020
1077	1003	968	1403	1534	7300
