= Garraf =

Coordinates: 41°19′N 1°49′E

- Comarca
- Country: Spain
- Autonomous community: Catalonia
- Region: Penedès
- Province: Barcelona
- Capital: Vilanova i la Geltrú
- Municipalities: List: Canyelles, Cubelles, Olivella, Sant Pere de Ribes, Sitges, Vilanova i la Geltrú

Government
  - Body: Garraf Comarcal Council
  - President: Mònica Gallardo (Junts) (2023-2024); TBD (PSC) (2024-2027)

Area
  - Total: 185.3 km^{2} (71.5 sq mi)

Population (2009)
  - Total: 143,066
  - Density: 772.1/km^{2} (2,000/sq mi)
- Demonym
- Time zone: UTC+1 (CET)
  - Summer (DST): UTC+2 (CEST)
- Largest municipality: Vilanova i la Geltrú

Garraf (Catalan pronunciation: [ɡəˈraf]), is a comarca (county) in the Penedès region in Catalonia, Spain. It is named after the Garraf Massif. The capital is the city of Vilanova i la Geltrú.

The GR 92 long-distance footpath, which roughly follows the length of the Mediterranean coast of Spain, has a staging point at Garraf. Stage 21 links northwards to Bruguers, a distance of 15.6 kilometres (9.7 mi), whilst stage 22 links southwards to Vilanova i la Geltrú, a distance of 22.0 kilometres (13.7 mi).

== Municipalities ==
Municipality	Population (2026)	Area km^{2}
Canyelles	5,494	14.23
Cubelles	17,648	13.49
Olivella	4,473	38.75
Sant Pere de Ribes	32,613	40.80
Sitges	32,690	43.85
Vilanova i la Geltrú	71,305	33.99
• Total: 6	164,223	185.11

== See also ==
- Diari de Vilanova
