= Garraf Massif =

Mountain range

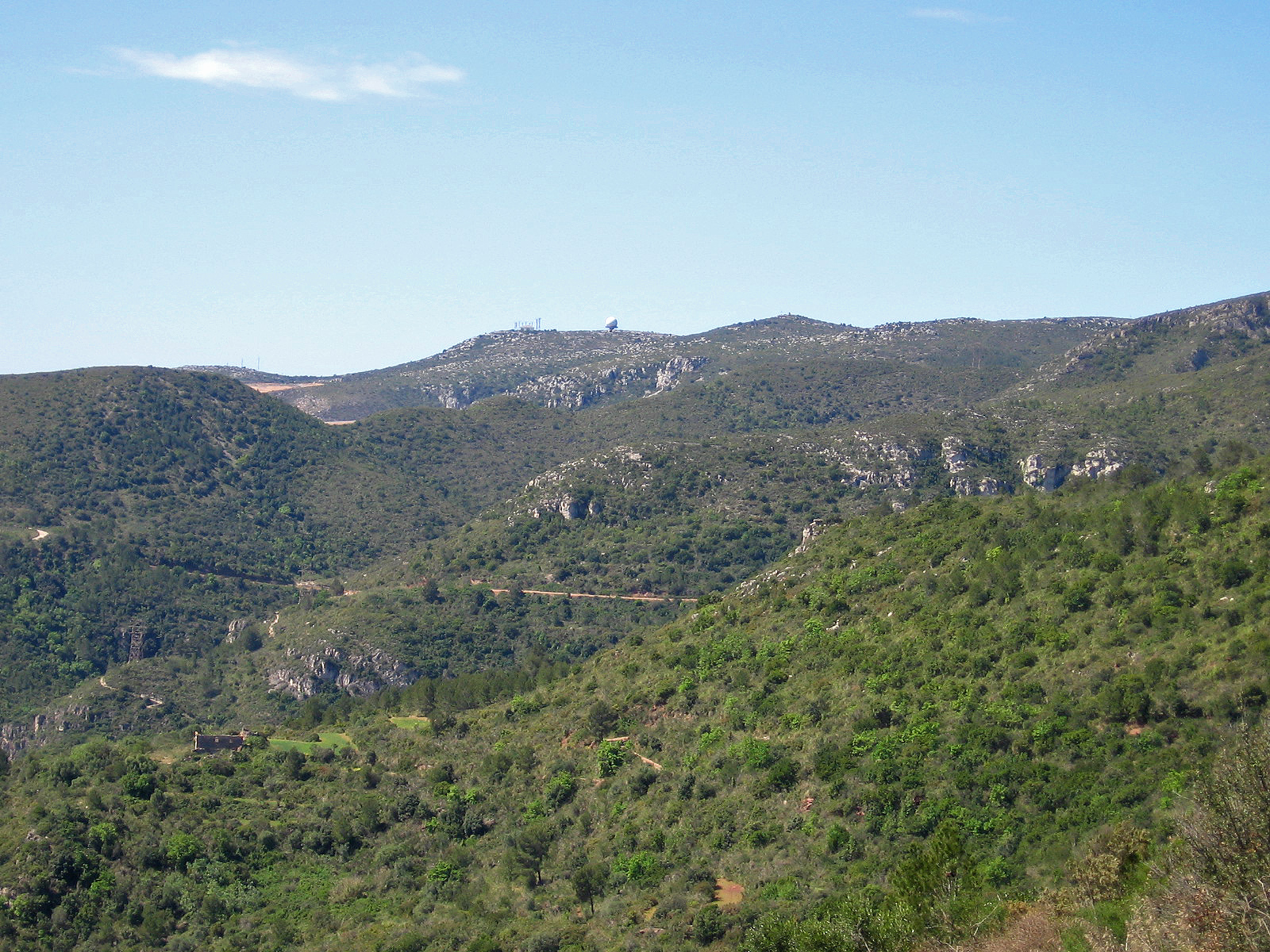

Highest point
- Elevation: 657.1 m (2,156 ft)
- Coordinates: 41°17′29″N 01°52′30″E

Geography
- Location within Province of Barcelona Location within Catalonia Location within Spain
- Location: Garraf, Catalonia
- Parent range: Catalan Coastal Range

Geology
- Mountain type: Karstic

Climbing
- First ascent: Unknown
- Easiest route: From Sitges or Castelldefels

The Garraf Massif (Catalan: Massís del Garraf, IPA: [məˈsiz ðəl ɣəˈraf]) is a mountain range of the Catalan Coastal Range, Catalonia, Spain. Its cliffs reach the Mediterranean waters. Its highest point on the coastal side is La Morella, 593 metres above sea level and further inland rises the higher, although less conspicuous, Montau (657 m).

== Geography ==
The Garraf Massif gives its name to the Garraf comarca, as well as to the little seashore village of Garraf. It is located south of Barcelona, between the coastal towns of Castelldefels and Sitges. highways C-31 and C-32, as well as the Renfe Barcelona-Valencia railway line go through the shoreline side of the Garraf Massif. The small town of Olivella, Plana Novella with its Buddhist monastery, as well as the abandoned village of Jafra are located in the middle of the massif, in the Natural Park area.

This coastal calcareous mountain range is sparsely wooded, and has many rocky denuded areas. The main vegetation is maquis shrubland and the Mediterranean Fan Palm is an endemic species of these mountains. It has over 400 karstic shafts and caves, including La Falconera, a very large cave with an underground lake that is now heavily polluted.

== Ecology ==
Despite having been declared a Protected Area by the Catalan Government, there are many seriously degraded areas throughout the massif. These include quarries and vast rubbish dumps that are very active and keep degrading the mountains and polluting their karstic underground lakes and rivers. Over 23 million tons of garbage have accumulated in the Vall d'en Joan landfill alone.

Urbanization has covered different zones of the range, especially in locations close to Sitges, as well as on the Castelldefels side. There the mountain sides are covered with mostly bungalows or small houses, especially in the seafront areas.

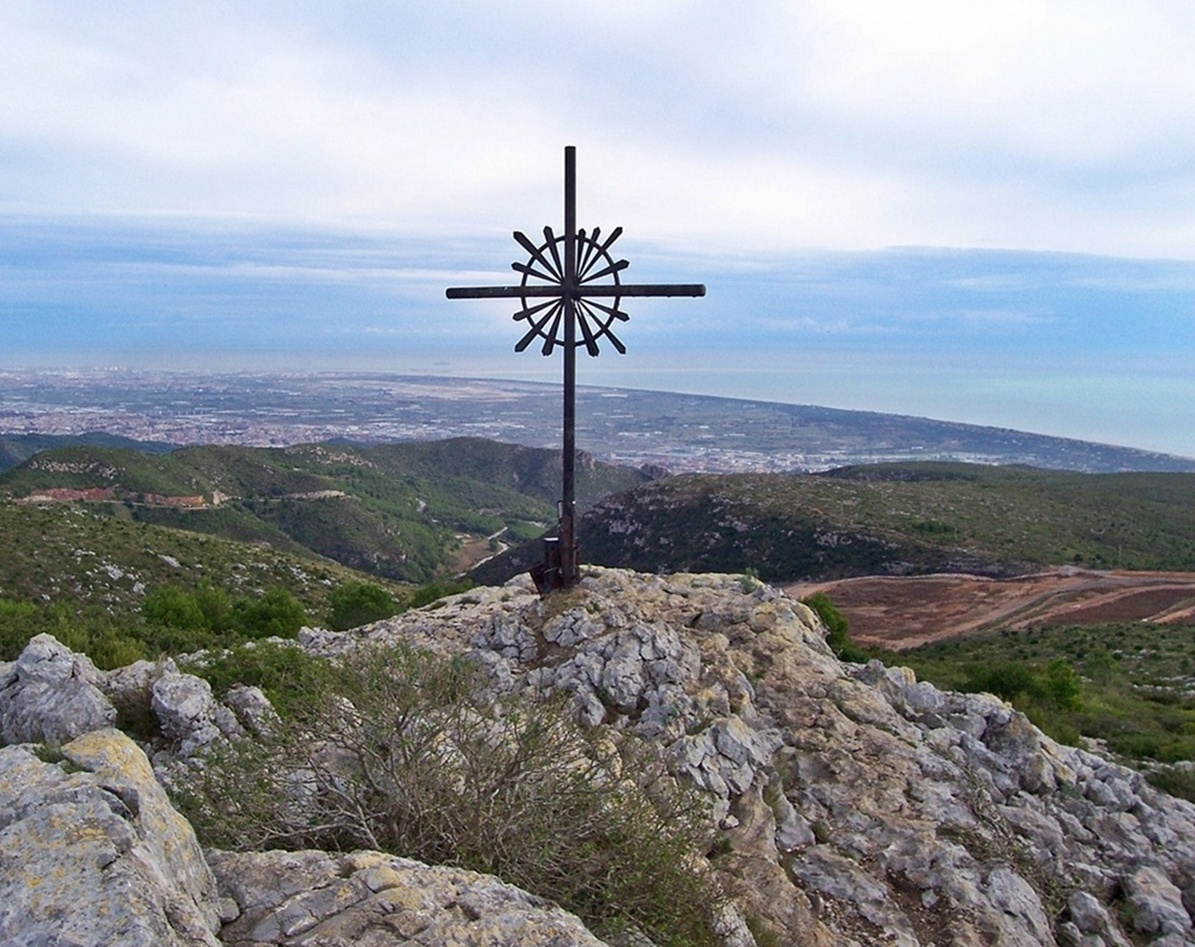
View from La Morella, the highest peak in the Garraf Massif.

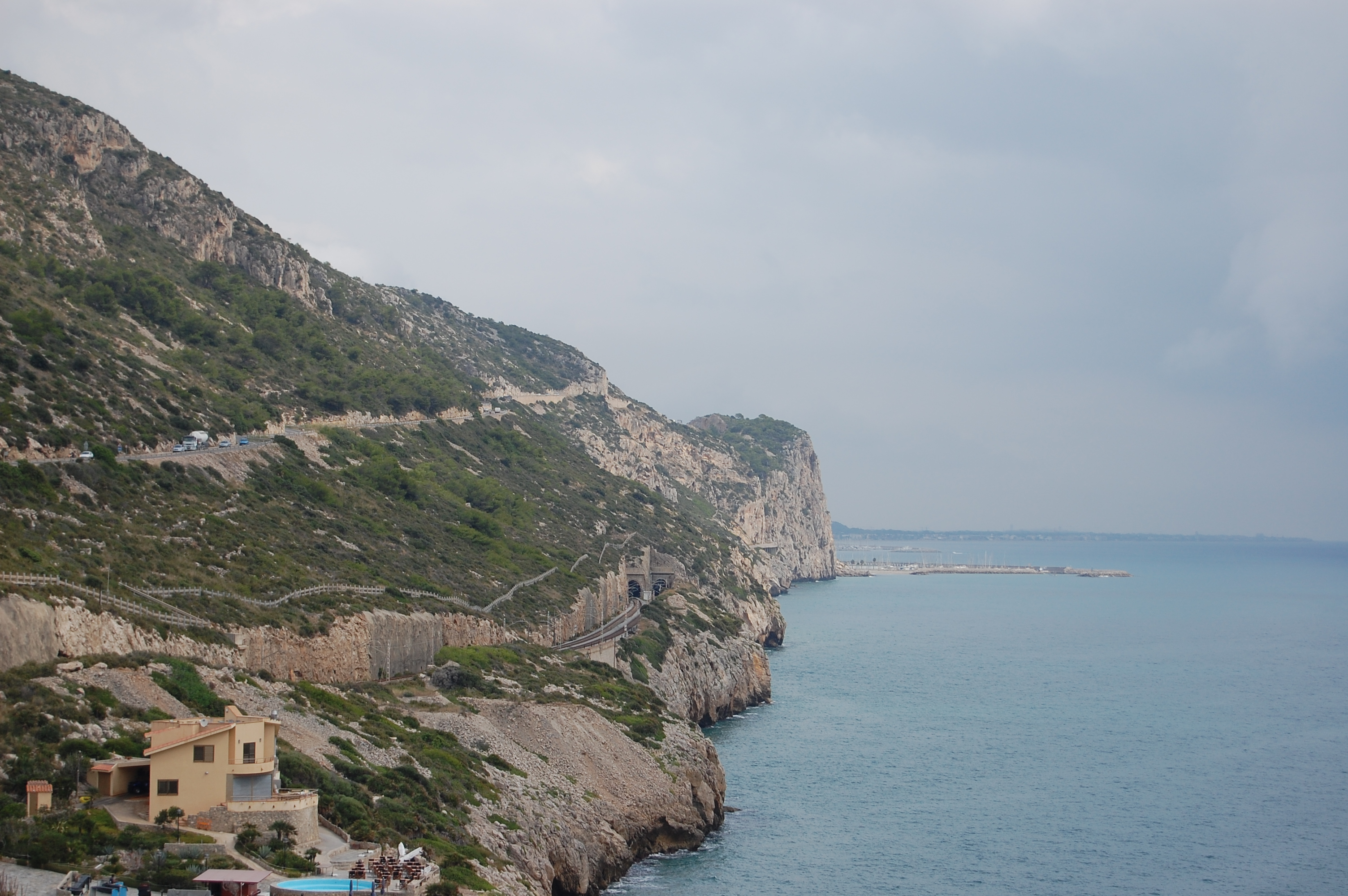
Massís del Garraf shoreline cliffs near Sitges

== See also ==
- Garraf, a seaside village
- Vallcarca, a limestone quarry complex with a now abandoned settlement in the Garraf Massif
- Olèrdola
- Plana Novella
- Catalan Coastal Range
- Mountains of Catalonia

== Bibliography ==
- Estanislau Vayreda, "Catàleg de la flòrula de la Mare de Déu del Mont", Treballs de la Institució Catalana d'Història Natural, 1919–1920, pp. 360–442.
