= Sant Llorenç del Munt i l'Obac Natural Park =

National Park in Spain

- Sant Llorenç del Munt i l'Obac Natural Park
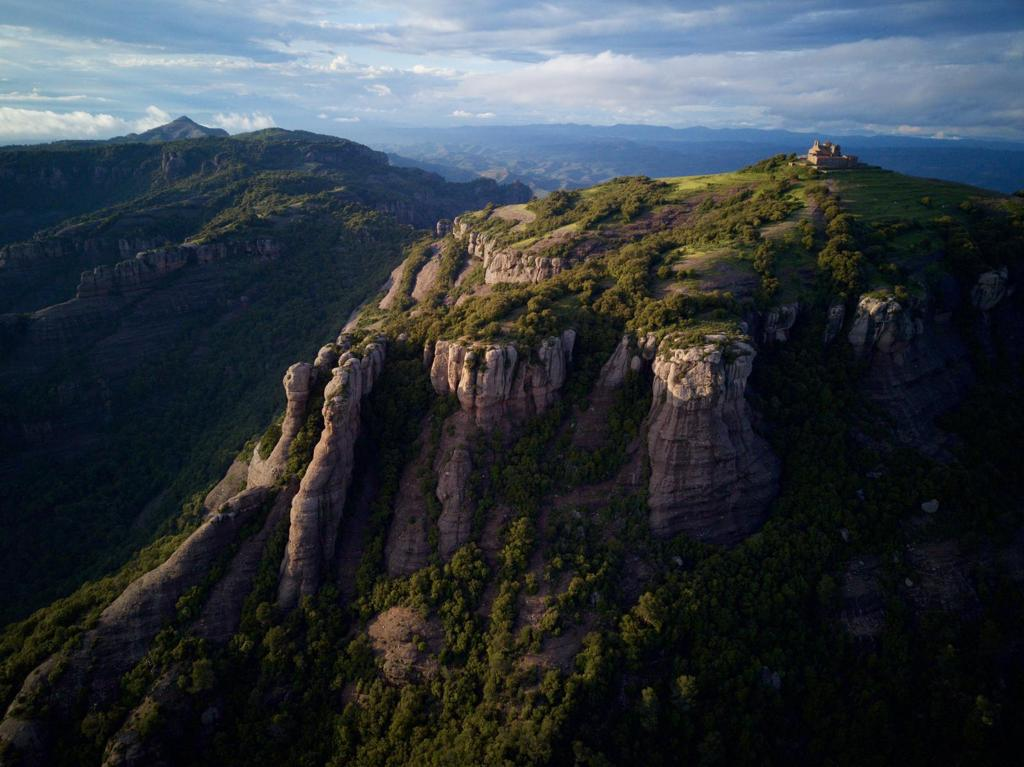
- Aerial view of Sant Llorenç del Munt.
- Range: Serra de l'Obac (Bages)
- Age: July 1972
- Operator: Bages (Catalonia), Vallès Occidental (Catalonia), Moianès (Catalonia) and province of Barcelona (Catalonia).

Area
  - Total: 300 ha (740 acres)

The Sant Llorenç del Munt i l'Obac Natural Park is made up of the Sant Llorenç del Munt massif and the Obac mountain range. It has a protected area of 13,694 hectares distributed between the regions of Bages, Vallès Occidental and Moianès. Its main peaks are Montcau (which is 1,056.7 metres (3,467 ft) tall), and La Mola (1,101.9 metres (3,615 ft) tall), where the Romanesque monastery of Sant Llorenç del Munt is located, along with other structures such as lime kilns.

The Park is part of the Network of Natural Parks managed by the Barcelona Provincial Council. The scenic, biological and cultural interest of the Sant Llorenç del Munt massif and the Serra de l'Obac justified its creation as a protected area, to promote the rational use of the territory and make possible the orderly use of its resources. At the same time, the park responds to the demand for equipment and facilities for recreation and education in the natural environment.

The first development plan for the park was made in July 1972. A new special plan was approved in 1982 in order to stop the disproportionate growth of the surrounding housing estates. Finally, in 1987 it was declared a natural park by a decree of the Generalitat de Catalunya. In 1998, the special plan was modified to extend 4,055 hectares to the current 13,694. The creation of the park was made possible through the persistent advocacy and defense efforts of citizen organizations over time.

In August 2003, a large forest fire damaged the north-eastern part of the park, in the area of the municipalities of Granera, Monistrol de Calders, Mura and Sant Llorenç Savall, where the fire started.

== Geology and climate ==
natural rock formations in the park

The park includes two massifs, the Sant Llorenç del Munt, which culminates in the aforementioned peaks of La Mola and Montcau, with more than a thousand meters each, and the Serra de l'Obac, not so high; its highest peaks are Castellsapera (939.3 m), Turó del Castellar (931 m) and Turó de Tres Creus (929.7 m). Both mountain ranges are separated to the south by the Arenes stream (a tributary of the Rubí stream) and to the north by the Estenalles torrent. The central point of the park is the Coll d'Estenalles (870.4 m), where there is an information center.

The orography of this entire area is very steep, full of cliffs and channels, with torrents and streams in all directions. Geologically, conglomerates predominate, forming a relief similar to the neighboring massif of Montserrat.

=== Climate ===
It has a subhumid Mediterranean climate. For this reason, the main forest that develops there is the holm oak forest and pine forests, although there are important oak forests, such as that of Les Teixoneres or that of Sot de la Bóta.

== Vegetation ==
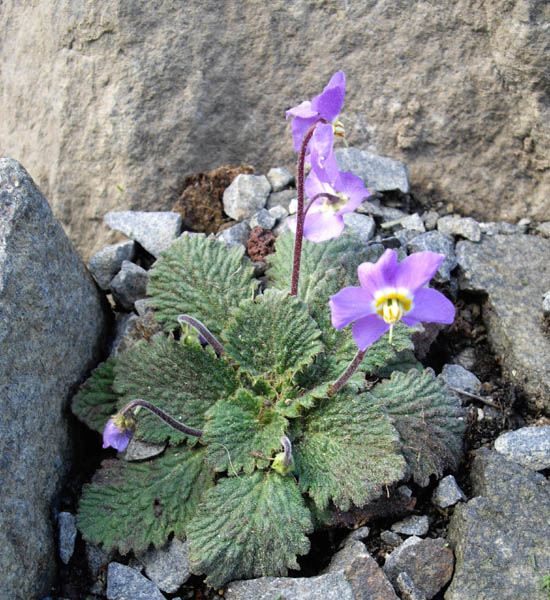
Ramonda myconi, popularly called bone ear; living fossil of the Cenozoic

The base of the massif is occupied by Scots forests, very resistant to water scarcity and reaching up to 600 meters in altitude. These pine forests, for the most part, are the result of human transformation of the primitive forest and in many areas appear mixed with holm oaks, and Mediterranean shrubs such as heather and strawberry tree. The holm oak forests constitute the characteristic and most widespread vegetation of the natural park, which above 800 meters is enriched with species typical of humid places such as mountain ash, boxwood, and oak, which forms some very interesting forests, such as the Teixoneres or the Soto de la Bota. In the shadiest channels, patches occupied by hazel trees appear, where plants native to the Central European region take root, constituting the southernmost strongholds of their distribution.

In the rocky outcrops and on the cliffs grow several plants of great interest, adapted to extreme conditions. Typical of places with little soil and facing north are the living fossil called the bone ear, the endemic queen's crown, the common polypodium, or the bellflower. In the rocky outcrops of the Solana, the aromatic thyme, the Onosma tricerosperma, the San Bruno lily, the tulip, or the small narcissus, are abundant in spring. Among the perennial plants, some with fleshy leaves, adapted to drought, such as the stonecrop, the wild lettuce, and the bunnies.
