= Coll d'Estenalles =

Mountain Pass

- Pass
- The visitor center located in the pass.
- Interactive map of Coll d'Estenalles
- Coordinates: 41.670496°N 1.994937°E
- Location: Parc Natural de Sant Llorenç del Munt i l'Obac
- Range: Sant Llorenç del Munt i l'Obac massif

Dimensions

The Coll d'Estenalles is a pass that joins the two main ridges of the Sant Llorenç del Munt i l'Obac massif from east to west, and the Sant Llorenç del Munt and the Serra de l'Obac, which run from north to south. It has an elevation of 870.4 metres (2,856 ft), and is located in the municipality of Mura, in the Bages region.

It is within the boundary of the Sant Llorenç del Munt i l'Obac Natural Park, in a fairly central location. It is home to the Coll d'Estenalles Information Centre, which is also located in the pass.

It is an important crossing point for municipalities in the north of the Vallès Occidental such as Matadepera or Terrassa, as well as municipalities in the east of Bages such as Mura, Talamanca or El Pont de Vilomara and Rocafort. It is also a place of passage for various routes and trails and is the starting point for some itineraries in the natural park.

== Location ==
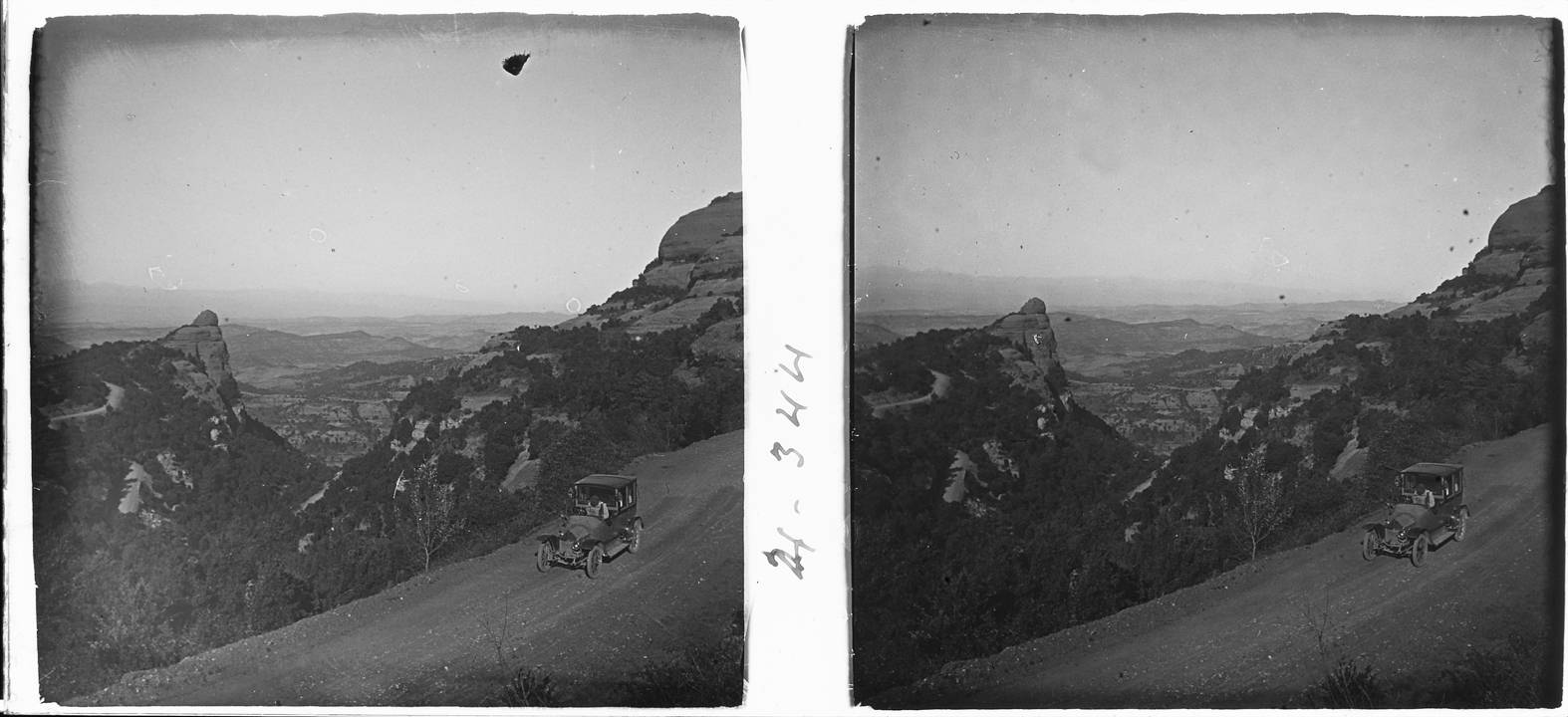
1916 photograph by Josep Salvany i Blanch from the Coll d'Estenalles

The Coll d'Estenalles is at the junction of the ridge of Sant Llorenç del Munt and the Serra de l'Obac. On the east side of the pass, it joins Sant Llorenç del Munt through the southwest buttress of Montcau (1,056 m), whose summit is almost 1 kilometre (0.62 mi) away. On the west side, the pass joins the summit of Muronell (922.5 m), located in the Serra de la Mata at just over 200 kilometres (120 mi), which is a secondary mountain range of the Serra de l'Obac.

The pass acts as a divider between the hydrographic basins of the Mura stream and the Arenes stream, which end up flowing into the Llobregat. On the northern slope of the pass, there is the Clot d'Estenalles, a narrow and deep valley that goes in a north-south direction and through which the Torrent d'Estenalles descends, which flows into the Nespres stream, and where the vertical walls of the monoliths of La Falconera and Els Cortins stand out. On the southern slope, there is the head of the Les Arenes stream, which runs through a wider valley with a more progressive slope, and which becomes part of the Rubí stream in the village of Les Fonts, located south of Terrassa.

== Transportation ==
The pass is the highest point of the BV-1221 road, which passes at 14.8 kilometres (9.2 mi) and goes from south to north from Terrassa (in the Vallès Occidental) to Navarcles (in the Bages). At km 14.6, 200 metres from the Coll d'Estenalles Information Centre, there is a parking area. From the pass there is a forest track of about 800 m that leads to the Mas de la Mata, which is currently the Office of the Natural Park of Sant Llorenç del Munt i l'Obac.

It is one of the places of passage of the GR 5 long-distance trail, which goes from Sitges (in the Garraf) to Canet de Mar (in the Maresme) passing through the Pre-Coastal Mountain Range, and is the beginning of the local SL C-54 trail, which goes to the summit of La Mola (1,103 m) and shares a section of 1, 5 km with the GR 5 to the Coll d'Eres. It is also a crossing point on the "Els 3 monts" hiking route on the stage from Sant Llorenç Savall to Mura.
