= Arenes stream =

Stream in Valles Occidental, Spain

- the river

Details
- Location: Vallès Occidental, Àmbit metropolità de Barcelona, Catalonia, Spain
- Length: 8.1 miles
- No. of terminals: 1

The Arenes stream (Catalan: Riera de les Arenes) is a long stream that flows down the Vallès Occidental for about 13 km (8.1 mi), and has a basin of 30 km^{2} (12 mi^{2}). It rises on the southern slope of the Coll d'Estenalles (870.4 m), below Montcau, in the Sierra de Sant Llorenç del Munt, in the municipality of Mura. It passes through Matadepera where Font de la Riba joins with this. Then, it passes through Terrassa and Les Fonts. Here it converges with the Palau stream and then becomes the Rubí stream, which ends up in the Llobregat.

== 1962 disaster ==
In 1962, the Vallès floods caused an overflow of the stream, the hot air chimney that rose in a cold air mass, triggered peak flows greater than 1000 l/m2. This caused large destruction and named victims in urban areas of Terrassa and Rubí.
