= Ripoll (river) =

River in Catalonia, Spain

Coordinates: 41°41′17.36″N 2°3′23.79″E

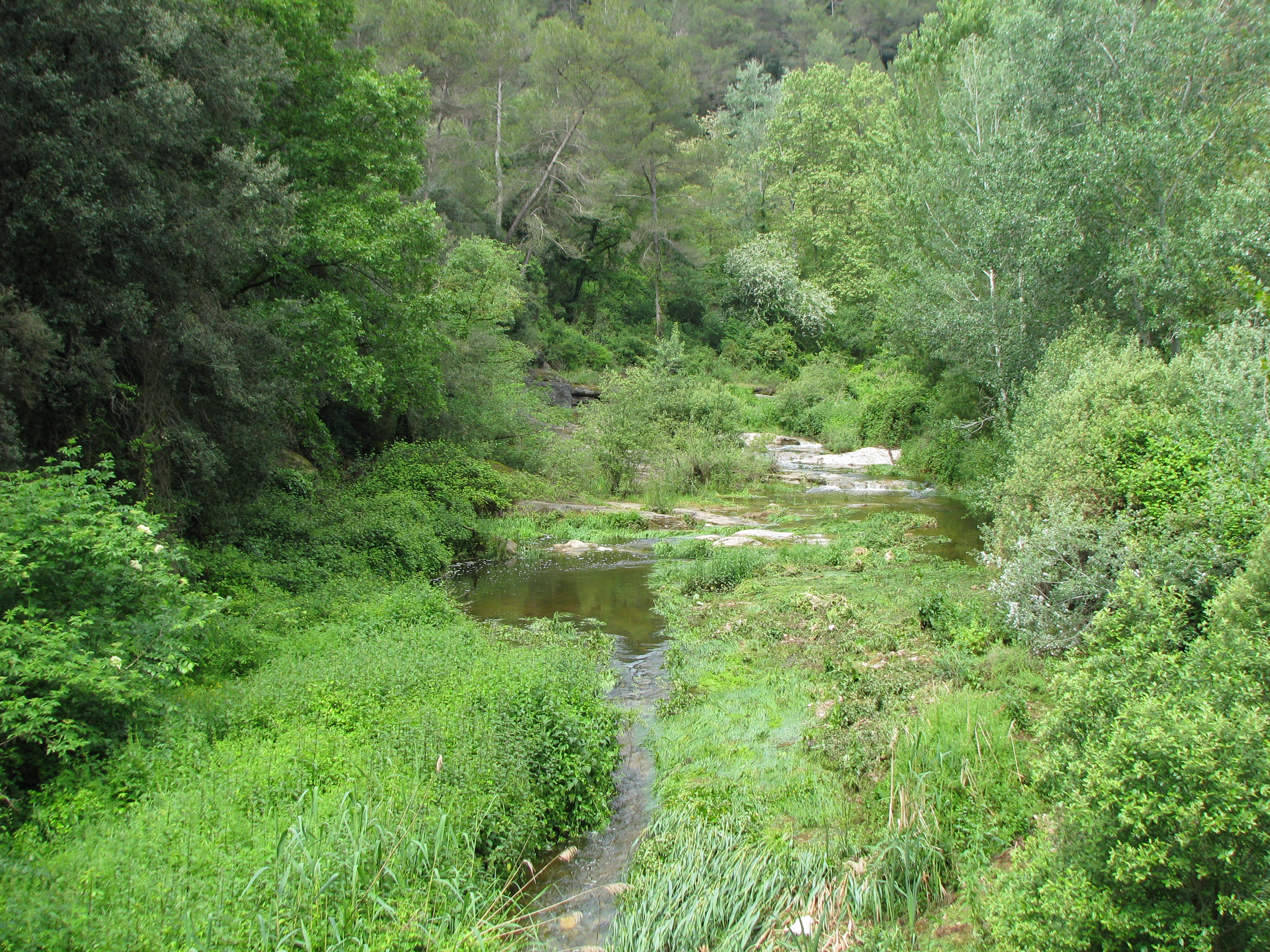
- The Ripoll in Les Arenes, Castellar del Vallès.

Location
- Country: Spain
- Region: Catalonia
- Cities: Sant Llorenç Savall, Castellar del Vallès, Sabadell, Barberà del Vallès, Ripollet, Montcada i Reixac

Physical characteristics
- Source: Serra de Granera
  - location: Granera, Catalonia, Spain
  - elevation: 640 m (2,100 ft)
- Length: 39.5 km (24.5 mi)
- Discharge
  - location: Montcada i Reixac

The Ripoll (Catalan: [riˈpoʎ], Spanish: [riˈpol]) is a river in the comarca of Vallès Occidental, Catalonia, Spain. It covers the vast majority of the shire, crossing it from north to south, and flows into the river Besòs, near Barcelona.

== Geography ==
The source of the river is located in the Serra de Granera, at 640 metres (2,100 ft) of elevation, and it discharges in Montcada i Reixac, at 35.5 metres (116 ft). It has a length of 39.5 kilometres (24.5 mi), with a total of 181.5 kilometres (112.8 mi), once its tributaries are included. It covers the vast majority of the comarca of Vallès Occidental, passing through the municipalities of Sant Llorenç Savall, Castellar del Vallès, Sabadell, Barberà del Vallès, Ripollet and Montcada i Reixac. Throughout the comarca, it crosses alluvial clay terrains, which erodes easily, causing the river to carve a deep path into the soil.

== History ==
Throughout its history, the river was used by the inhabitants of the surrounding area for irrigation. Irrigation has been in place from at least the mid-10th century, when priests of Sant Llorenç built an irrigation system that is still used to work the orchards along the riverside and mills to produce flour.

As modernization also reached the area, most of the mills were reconverted to produce paper. However, by the 18th century, the production of paper had ceased to be a dominant industry along the river.

During the 19th century, the mills of the riverside were reconverted again, this time into textile factories, which lasted until the late 20th century. Due to the dyes and chemicals used in the textile industry, the water of the river became heavily polluted.

More recently, because of the Catalan textile crisis, most of the factories were abandoned or reconverted for other uses, lessening the strain on the river's water quality. Recently, there have been initiatives to recover the Ripoll for community recreation, by restoring the river, which had deteriorated due not only to industrial pollution but also to the shanty towns made by immigrants who came to work in the mills from Southern Spain during the 1960s.

== 1962 disaster ==
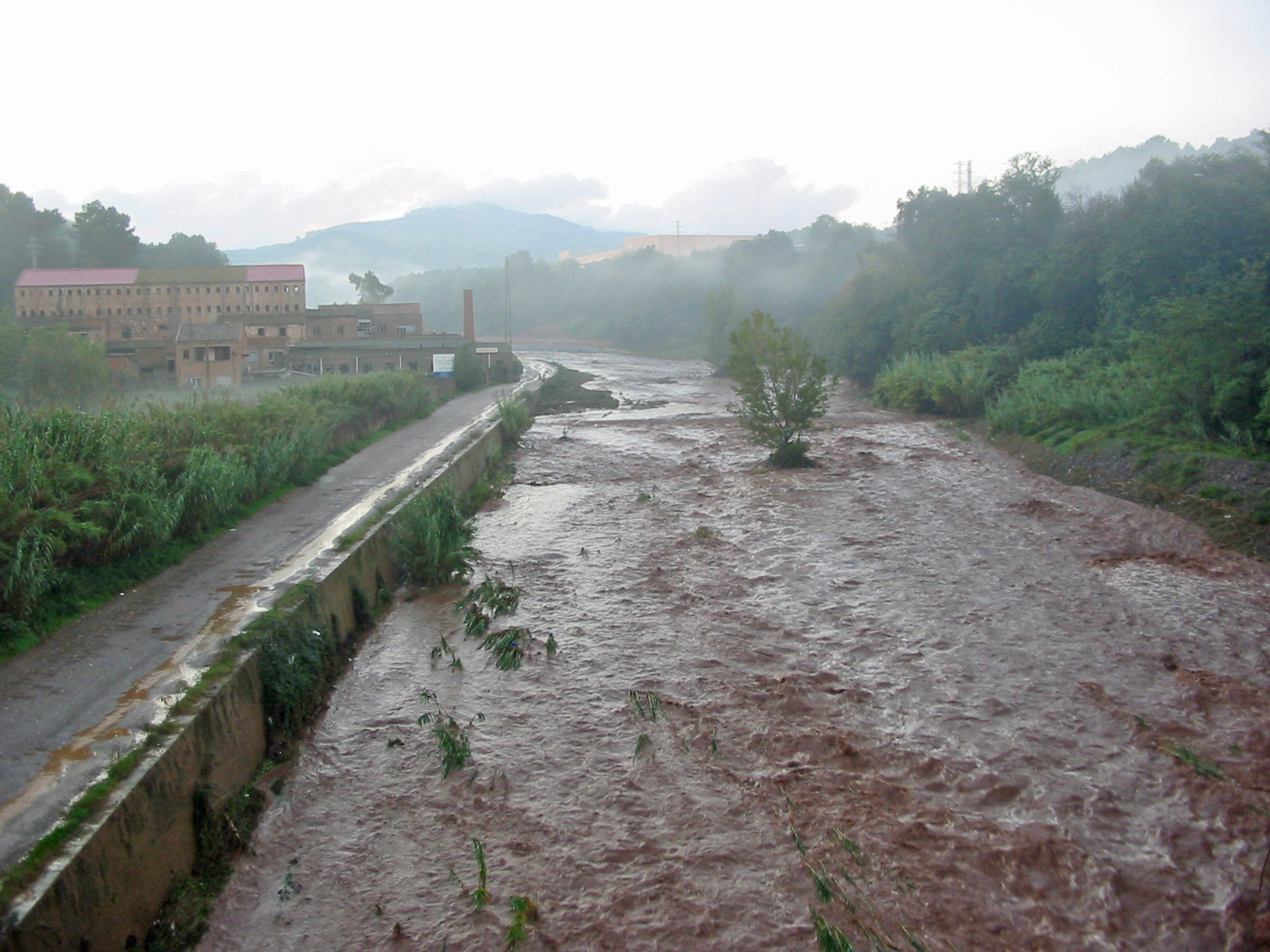
The Ripoll in Sabadell during a flood, very common in spring, when the Mediterranean climate suffers torrential rains.

In 1962, the Vallès Occidental suffered a period of strong floods followed by winds that devastated the shire and caused hundreds of deaths. The immigrants from southern Spain who were extremely poor and had settled in the riverside suffered the worst consequences.

== See also ==
- List of rivers of Catalonia
