= Badia del Vallès =

Town and municipality in Barcelona, Spain

- Municipality
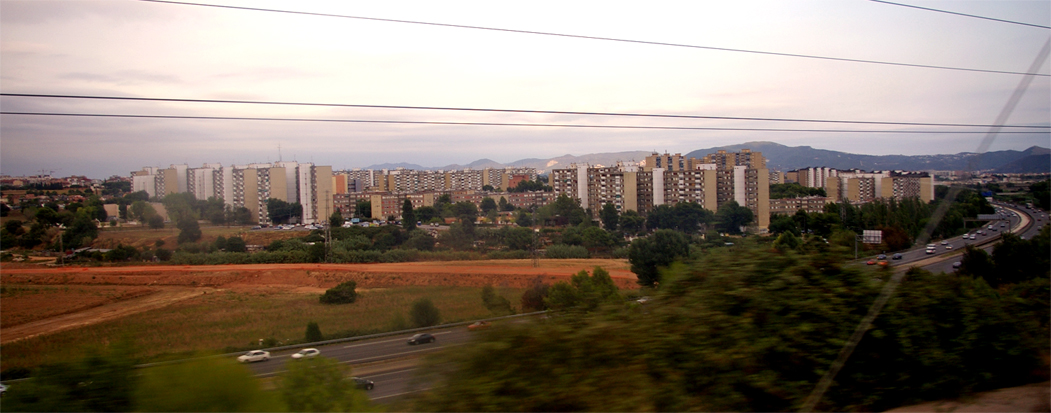

- Flag Coat of arms

- Location in Catalonia Badia del Vallès (Spain)
- Coordinates: 41°30′29″N 2°6′50″E
- Country: Spain
- Comarca: Vallès Occidental

Government
  - Mayor: Eva Menor Cantador (2015)

Area
  - Total: 0.9 km^{2} (0.35 sq mi)

Population (2025-01-01)
  - Total: 13,060
  - Density: 15,000/km^{2} (38,000/sq mi)
- Website: badiadelvalles.cat

Badia del Vallès (Catalan pronunciation: [bəˈðiə ðəl βəˈʎɛs]) is a town and municipality in the province of Barcelona and autonomous community of Catalonia, Spain.

== History ==
The township has its beginnings in the 1960s by a government plan aimed at creating a residential area on the outskirts of the towns of Barberà del Vallès and Cerdanyola del Vallès made up of 11,054 homes and all services relating thereto. In 1970 the first phase began with the construction of the first 4,156 homes, 98 premises and internal development.

Before the start of the construction of Phase 2, the Ministry of Public Works completed the construction of the Barcelona-Terrassa motorway and the third belt, occupying three quarters of the land prescribed for the second phase, on which only 1,216 new homes and 38 premises could be built. The works were finished in 1973 but the city was not inaugurated, under the then Prince Juan Carlos, until 1975. On April 14, 1994, the municipality of Badia del Vallès was established for the first time, separated from Barberà del Vallès and Cerdanyola del Vallès and the Commonwealth of these two populations became extinct.

== Population ==
The municipality covers an area of 0.92 square kilometres (0.36 sq mi) and the population in 2014 was 13,553. Badia del Vallès consists of a single nucleus or body population.

== Symbols ==
Badia del Vallès is a young city (incorporated in 1994 with land segregated from Barberà del Vallès and Cerdanyola del Vallès) formed in the 1970s mostly with people who emigrated south of the Iberian Peninsula. Thus the swallow was chosen as the symbol of migration, while the colors of each partition represent the two original municipalities (gold for Barberà and sinople for Cerdanyola).

=== Flag ===
Badia del Vallès uses an heraldic flag which follows the same pattern as its shield, and is defined as an "Oblong flag of proportions two high by three long, two-tone yellow and green vertical stripes, with the black swallow with the white chest of the shield, height 5/7 of the cloth, centered in the middle of the partition."
