= Gabriel Mora =

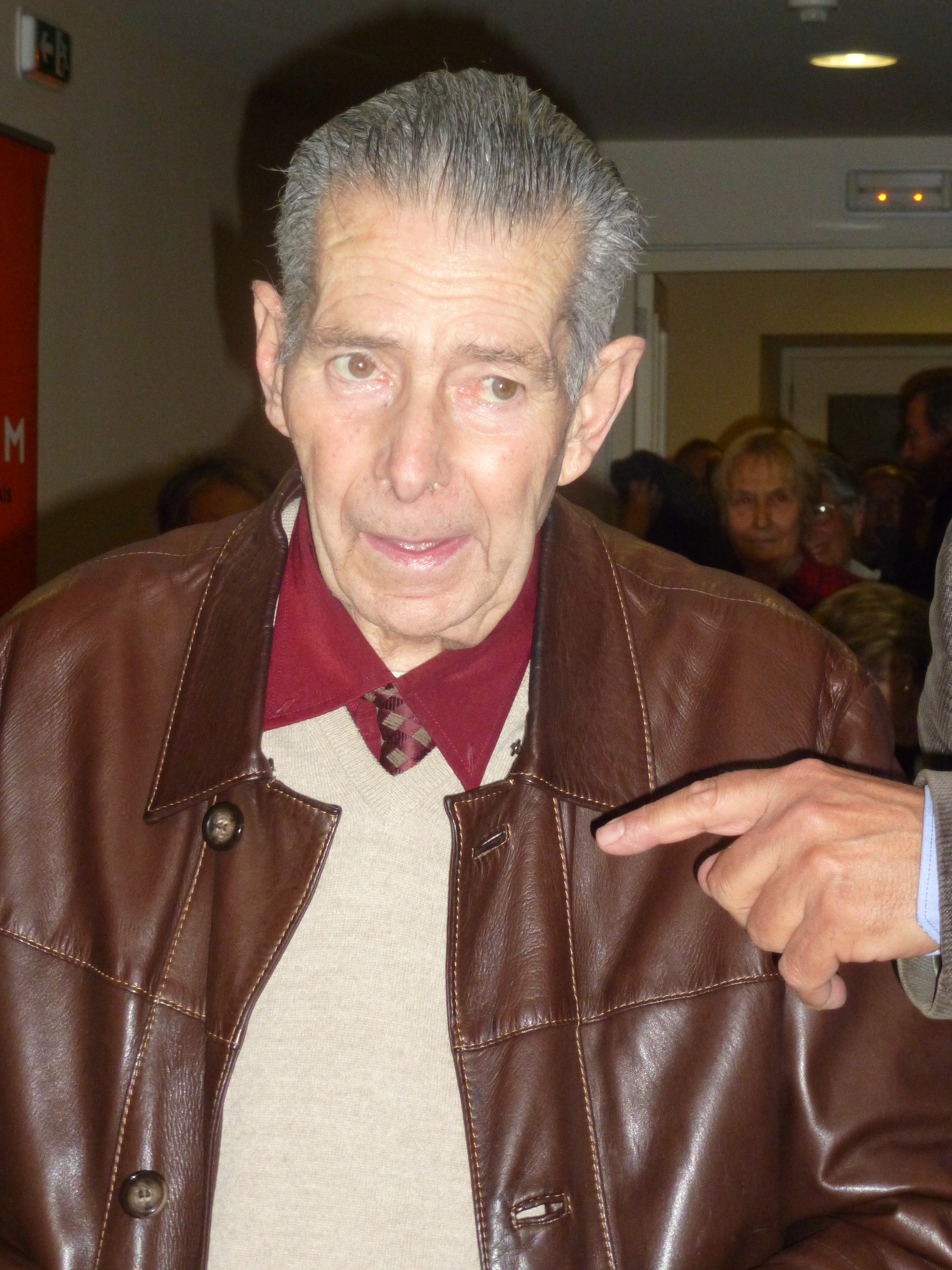
Gabriel Mora

Gabriel Mora i Arana (born 13 September 1925, Castellar del Vallès – died 25 November 2014, Manresa) was a Catalan writer, mechanic and seller, nominated in 1975 and 1990 to Mestre en Gai Saber. He was very active in the Esperantist movement.

== Prizes ==
- Ciutat de Barcelona de poesia, 1971: Amb la mà esquerra
- Vila de Perpinyà, 1972: Roses a Psique
- Vila de Vallirana-Josep M. López Picó de poesia, 1975: Cercant aurores
- Flor Natural als Jocs Florals de Barcelona, 1977: Plenitud intacta
- Ciutat de Reus de poesia, 1985: Renou de mites
- Ciutat d'Olot-Guerau de Liost de poesia i prosa poètica, 1989: Innovació dels orígens
- Viola d'Or i Argent als Jocs Florals de Barcelona, 1990: Procés obert

== Works ==
- El poemari "Gènesi" a l'obra Tharrats, obra gràfica 1957-1990 (B: Parsifal, 1990)
- "Calidoscopi de sol i de celístia". Manresa: Obra Cultural de la Caixa de Manresa, 1980
- "Foc d'arrels". 1983. ISBN 84-300-8853-9.
- "Renou de mites". Barcelona: Edicions del Mall, 1986.
- "Innovació dels orígens". Barcelona: Columna, 1990. ISBN 84-7809-147-5.
