= Blanquer =

Blanquer is a surname. Notable people with the surname include:

- Jean-Michel Blanquer (born 1964), French politician, the Minister of Education
- Joan Blanquer i Penedès (1912–2002), Spanish filmmaker and scriptwriter
- Rafael Blanquer (born 1945), Spanish long jumper
