= Monestir de Sant Llorenç del Munt =

Coordinates: 41°38′28.38″N 02°01′4.98″E

Sant Llorenç del Munt Monastery
- Monestir de Sant Llorenç del Munt (Catalan)
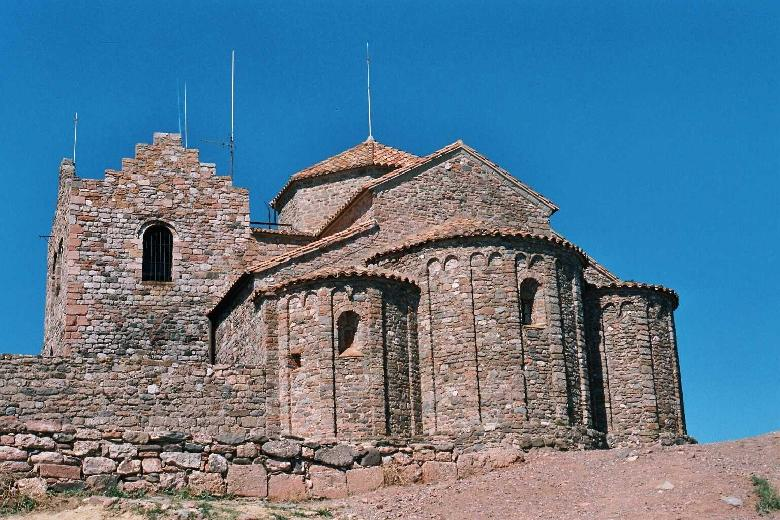
- Monestir de Sant Llorenç del Munt

- Location within Catalonia
- Location: Matadepera, Barcelona, Catalonia, Spain

Site notes
- Architectural style: Romanesque

Spanish Cultural Heritage
- Official name: Monestir de Sant Llorenç del Munt
- Type: Non-movable
- Criteria: Monument
- Designated: 3 June 1931
- Reference no.: RI-51-0000445

Sant Llorenç del Munt is a Benedictine monastery in Matadepera, Vallès Occidental, Catalonia, Spain. It is situated on top of La Mola, the summit of the rocky mountain massif, Sant Llorenç del Munt, within Parc Natural de Sant Llorenç del Munt i l'Obac. It was declared a Bien de Interés Cultural landmark in 1931.

== History ==
The first record that indicates there was a religious community here governed by an abbot corresponds to the year 986. In 1014, the word monastery appeared in a document associated with Count Ramon Borrell and his wife regarding a land swap with the abbey of San Llorenç. There is mention in 1018 regarding an abbot at Sant Llorenç del Munt.

During this time period, the area was invaded several times by the Saracens, but there is no record of any attacks against buildings that were in the top of Sant Llorenç del Munt. Construction of the Romanesque building which currently stands began in 1045 and was consecrated in 1064 by the Bishop and the Counts of Barcelona. Its decline began the early 12th century, although it continued to be inhabited by a Benedictine monk until 1608. By 1637, there was no evidence of a priest in charge of the monastery, and it was later known to abandoned. On March 30, 1809, the troops of Napoleon's army destroyed what was left of the monastery, even desecrating the abbots' graves.

== Architecture and fittings ==
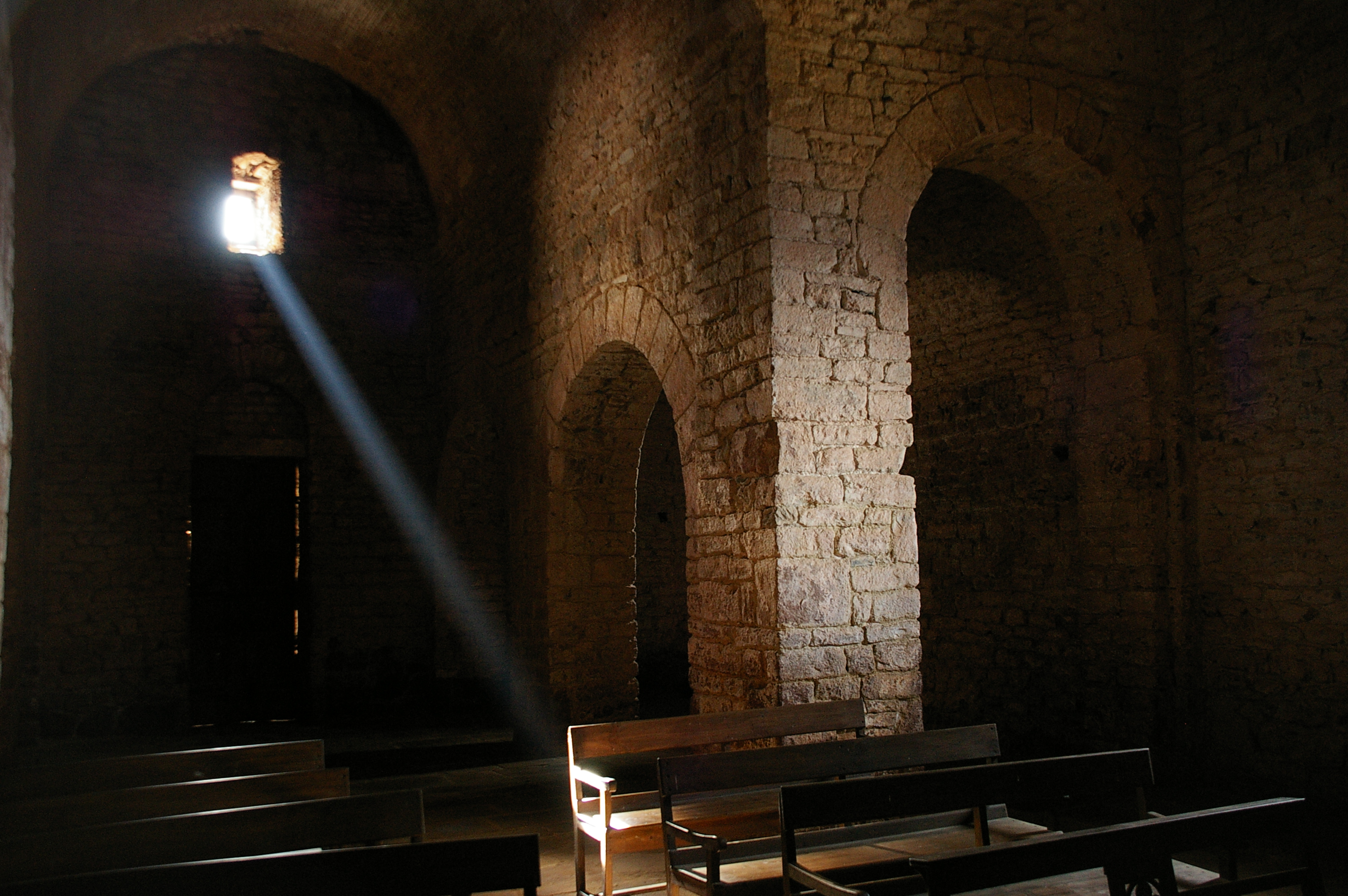
Interior view

The current building, constructed between the late 19th century and mid-20th centuries, respects the original structure built in the mid-11th century. It is a good example of the religious Catalan Romanesque style, one of the few existing monasteries of this time. The structure of the church has not undergone any change that alter its original design. It is an exact replica, but half the size of the Monastery of Sant Cugat, which promoted Sant Llorenç del Munt construction. The church has three naves and a bell tower raised with local stones, characterized as being of modest size, redness and unpolished. It has a transept in the center holding the dome on arches. The door is small.

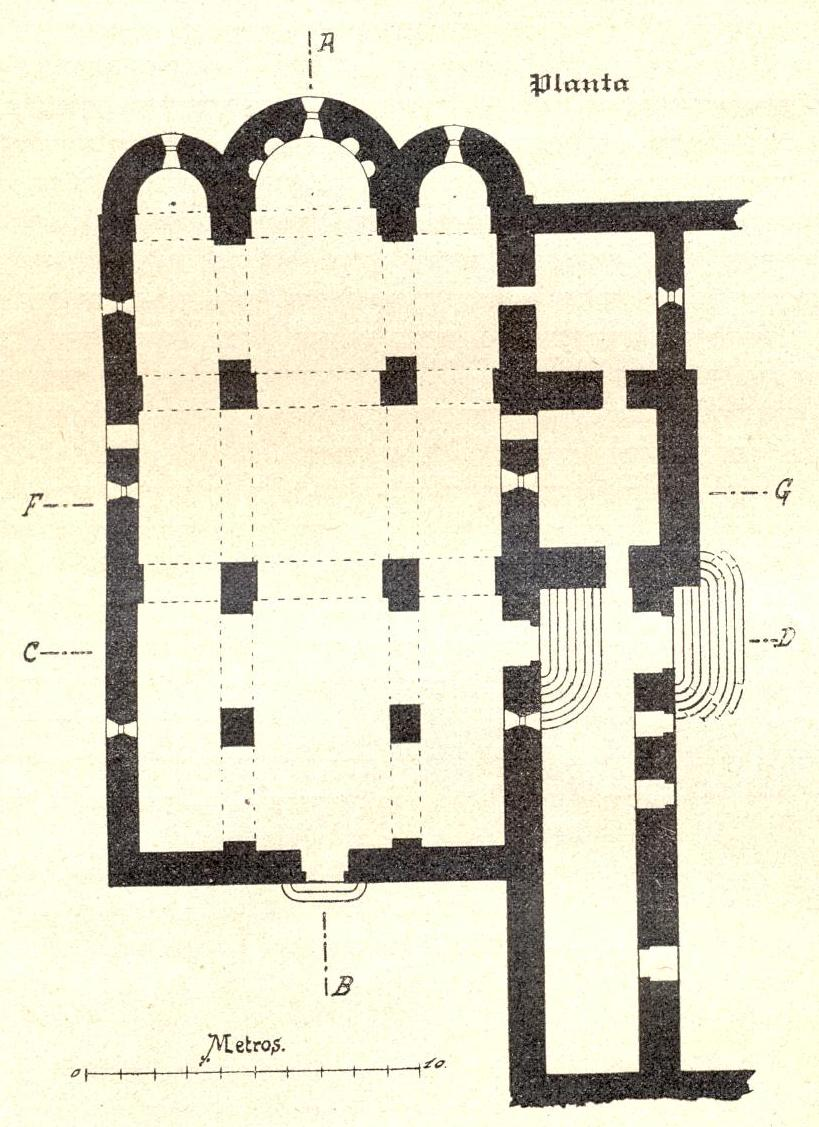

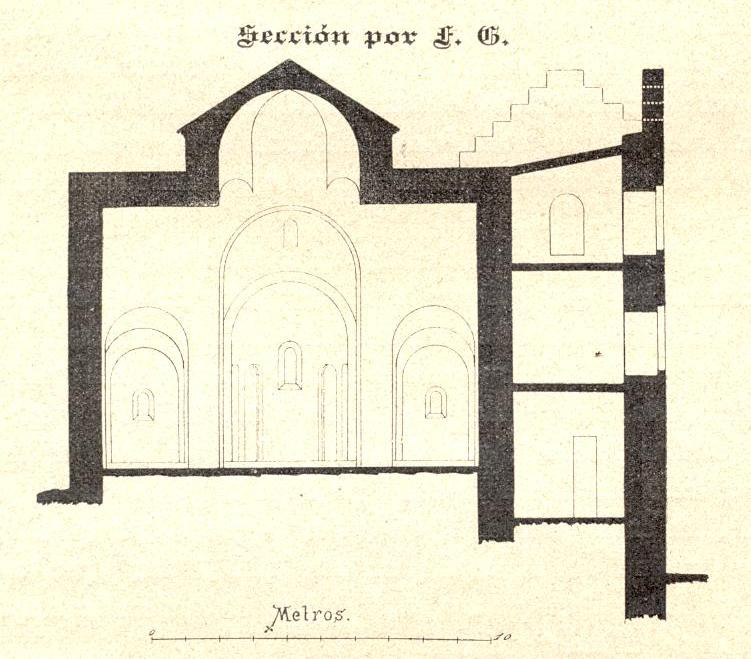

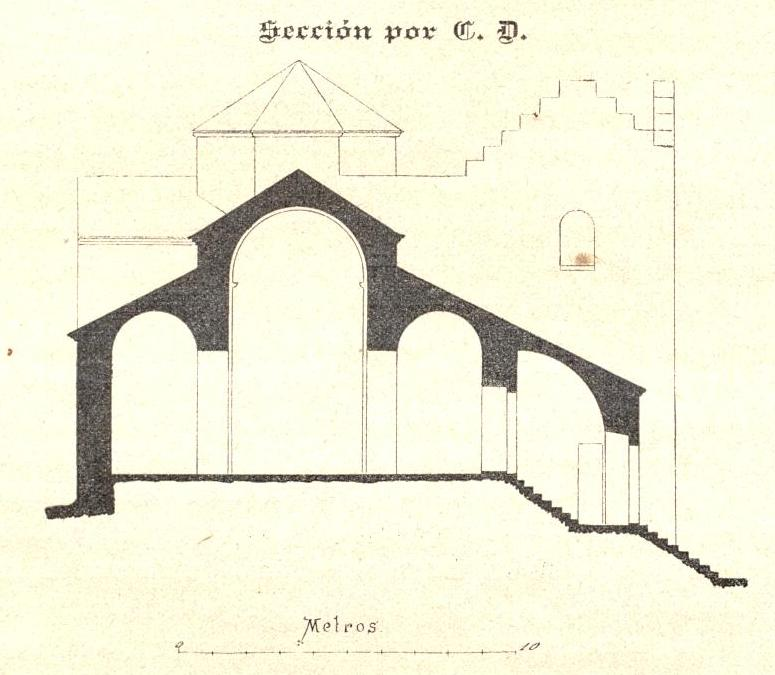

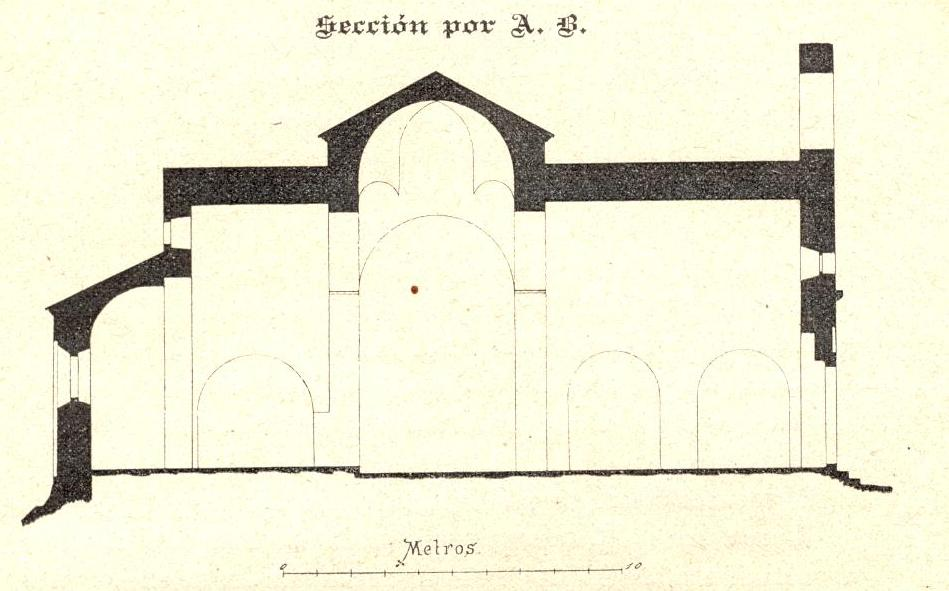
