= José Eduardo González Navas =

Spanish politician (born 1951)

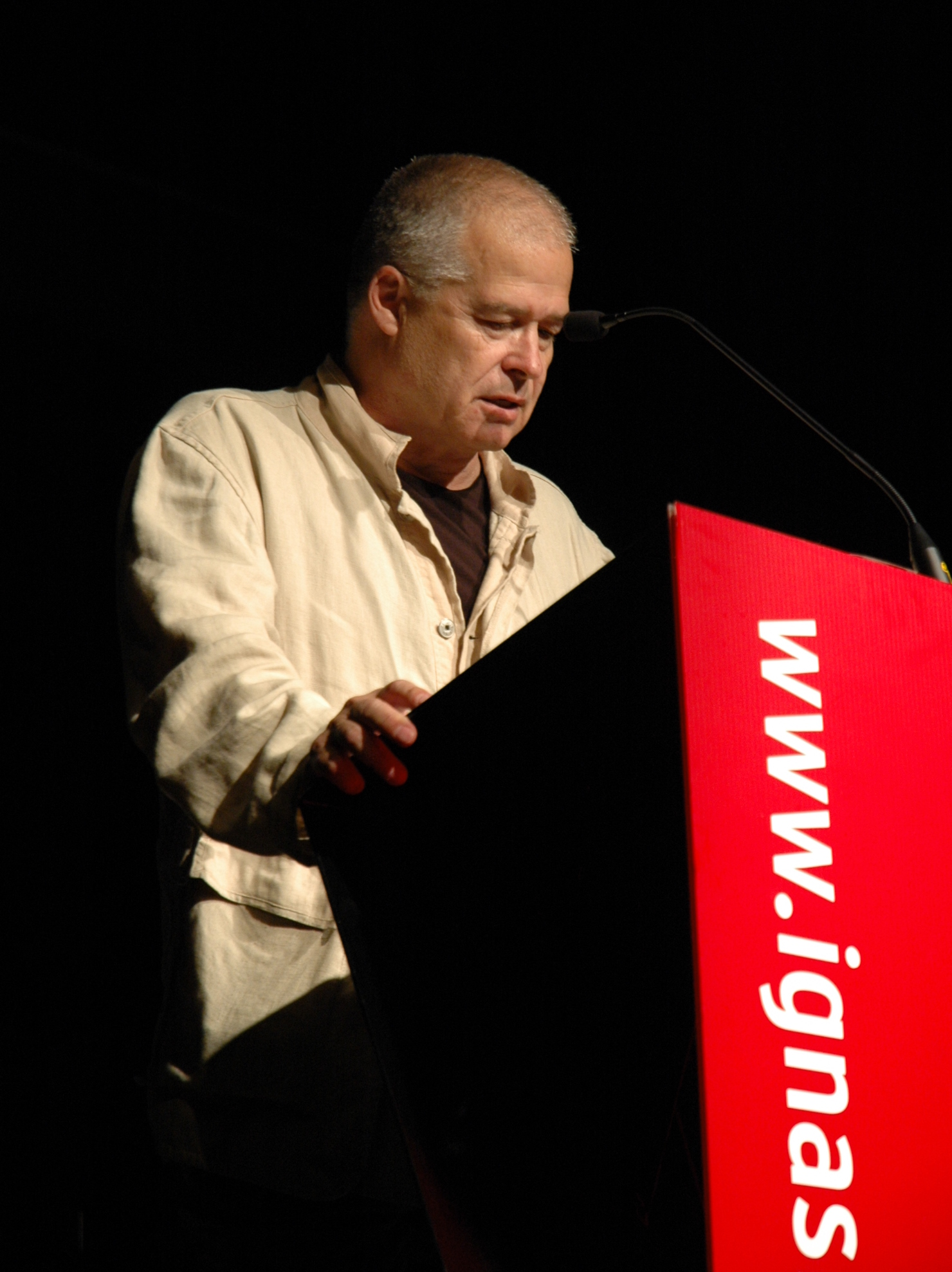
José Eduardo González Navas

José Eduardo González Navas known as Pepe Gonzalez (born 14 April 1951, Íllora, Granada, Spain) is a Spanish politician, established in Catalonia since 1965. In 1972 he won the poetry prize of Olot City. He graduated in economics from the Autonomous University of Barcelona, and now is socialist councilor at Castellar del Vallès.

Affiliated with the UGT union and the Catalan Federation of the Spanish Socialist Workers' Party (PSOE) since 1974, played a crucial role in the unification of Catalan socialism during the founding congress of the Partit dels Socialistes de Catalunya (PSC). After the unification occupied different roles at different party organs. He was elected Member of Parliament of Catalonia during the elections in Catalonia in 1980 and 1984. During his position as deputy was one of the speakers of the first law about Catalan and the law about school councils.

In 2003 he was elected councilor for the PSC at Castellar del Vallès in the opposition. With the victory Ignasi Giménez Renom passed in 2007 to occupy positions within the government team, a situation that would be repeated in 2011, after the socialist victory by an absolute majority in this village.
