= Santa Perpètua de Mogoda =

Santa Perpètua Santa Perpètua de Mogoda (Catalan)
- Municipality
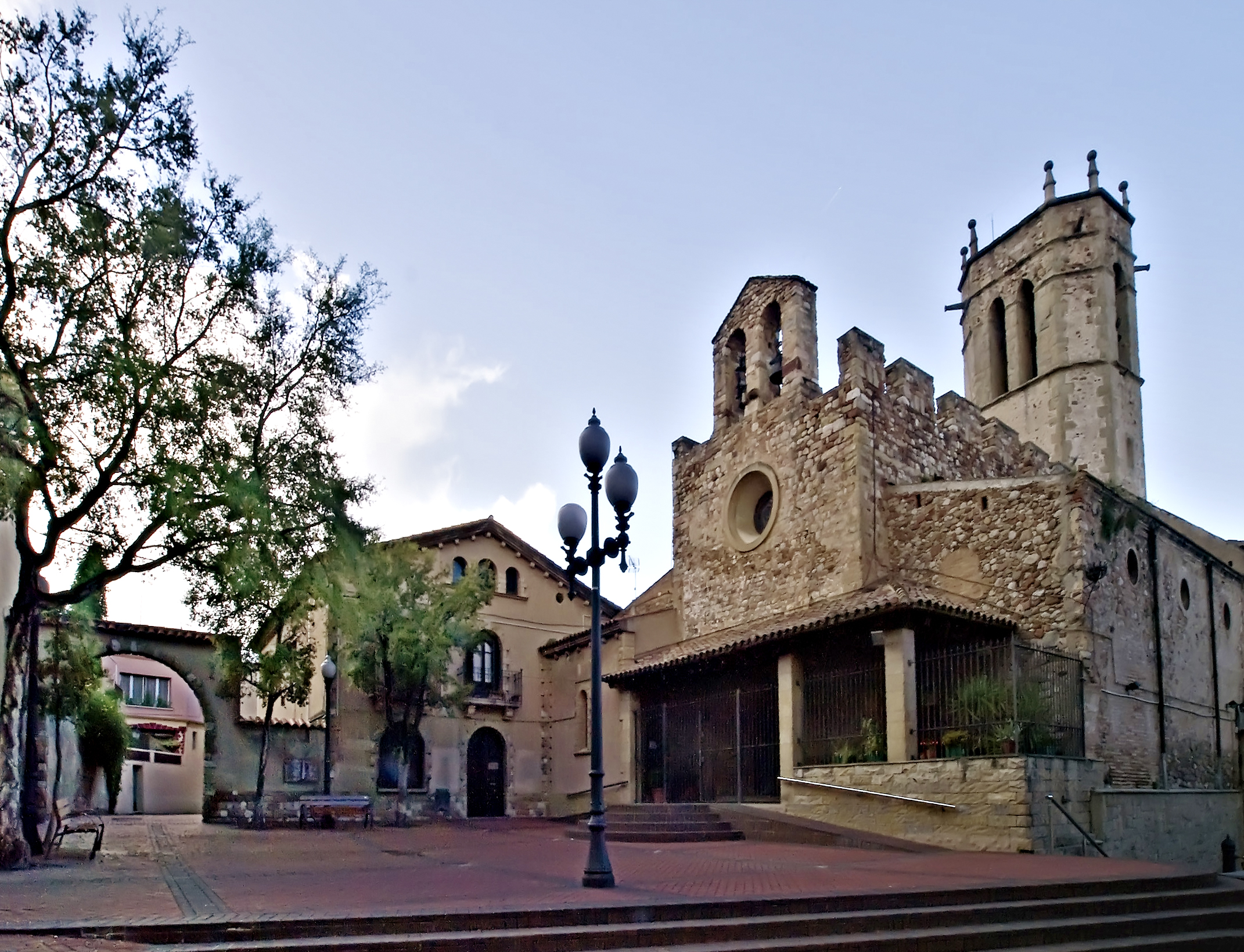

- Flag Coat of arms

- Location in the Province of Barcelona Location in Catalonia Location in Spain
- Coordinates: 41°32′15″N 2°10′55″E
- Country: Spain
- Autonomous community: Catalonia
- Province: Barcelona
- Comarca: Vallès Occidental

Government
  - Mayor: Juan Carlos Mingueza

Area
  - Total: 15.8 km^{2} (6.1 sq mi)
- Elevation: 74 m (243 ft)

Population (2025-01-01)
  - Total: 26,130
  - Density: 1,650/km^{2} (4,280/sq mi)
- Demonym: Perpetuenc
- Postal code: 08130
- Website: staperpetua.cat

Santa Perpètua de Mogoda (Catalan pronunciation: [ˌsantə pərˈpɛtuə ðə muˈɣɔðə]) is a municipality (comarca) of Vallès Occidental in Catalonia.
