= Ripollet =

- Municipality
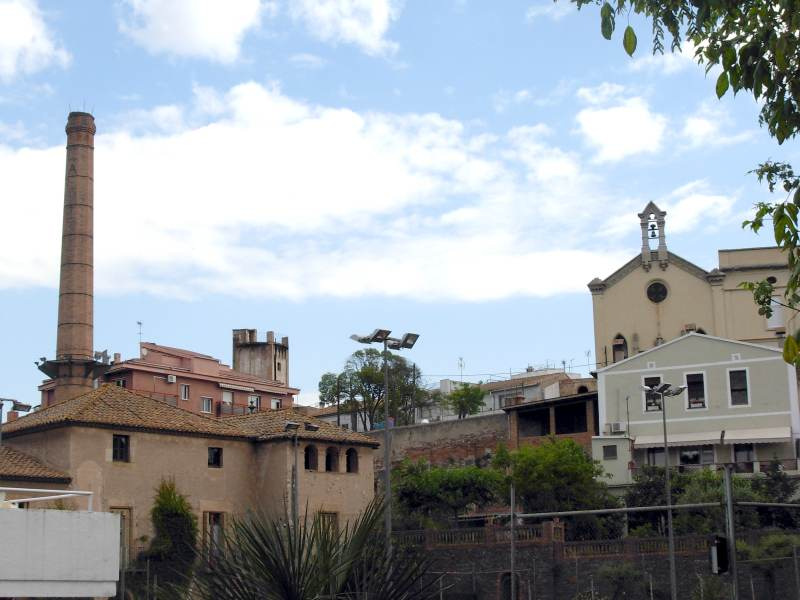

- Flag Coat of arms

- Location in Catalonia Ripollet (Spain)
- Coordinates: 41.497°N 2.154°E
- Country: Spain
- Community: Catalonia
- Province: Barcelona
- Comarca: Vallès Occidental

Government
  - Mayor: José Maria Osuna López (2015)

Area
  - Total: 4.3 km^{2} (1.7 sq mi)
- Elevation: 36 m (118 ft)

Population (2025-01-01)
  - Total: 39,897
  - Density: 9,300/km^{2} (24,000/sq mi)
- Website: ripollet.cat

Ripollet (Catalan pronunciation: [ripuˈʎɛt]) is a municipality in the comarca of the Vallès Occidental in Catalonia, Spain. It is situated on the left bank of the Ripoll river. The town is served by the AP-7, C-58 and C-33 highways, the N-150 road and a Renfe railway line.

== Demography ==
1900	1930	1950	1970	1986	2020
1501	3324	3736	n/a	25,833	39,179
