= Viladecavalls =

- Municipality
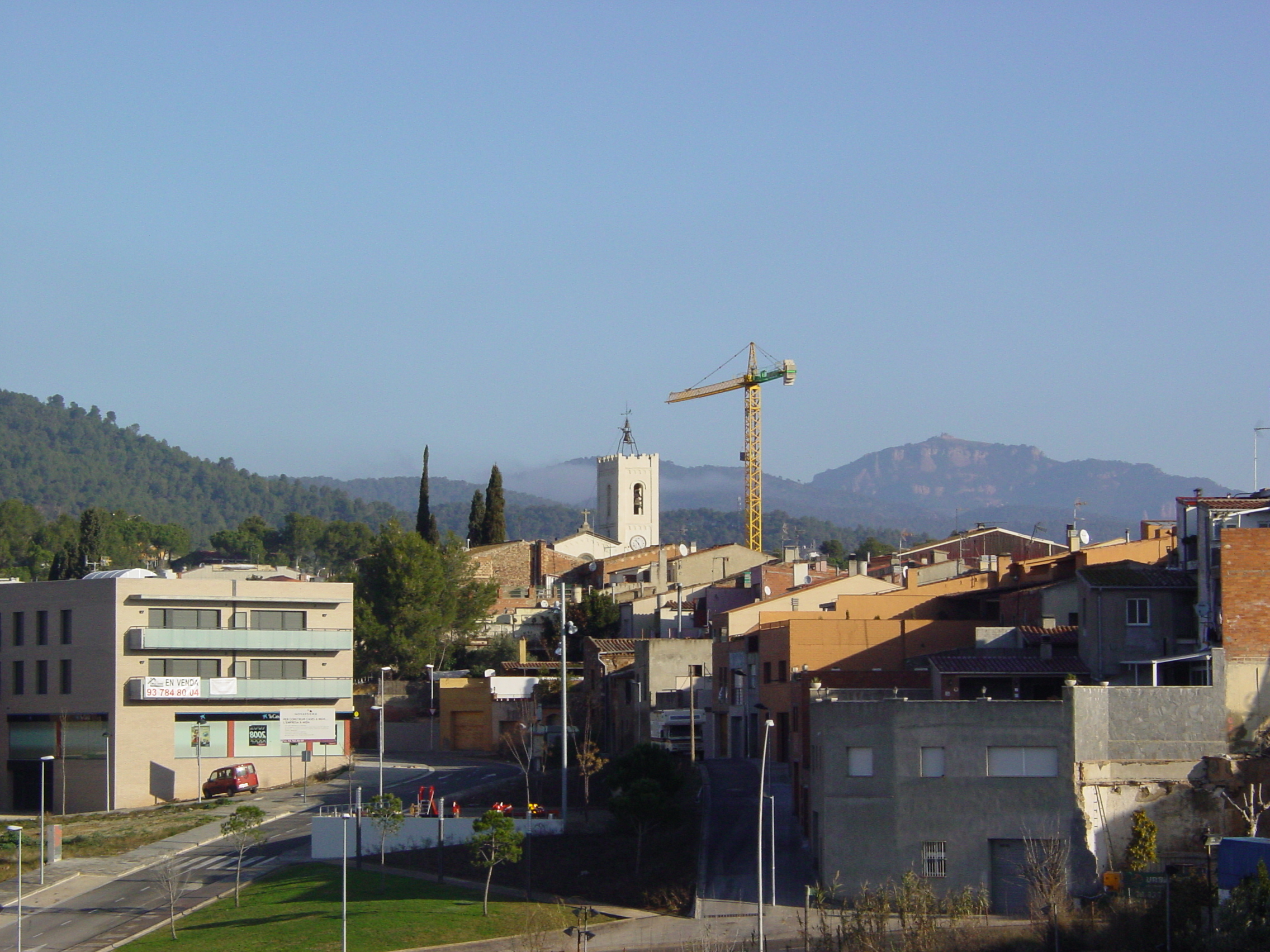
- Viladecavalls

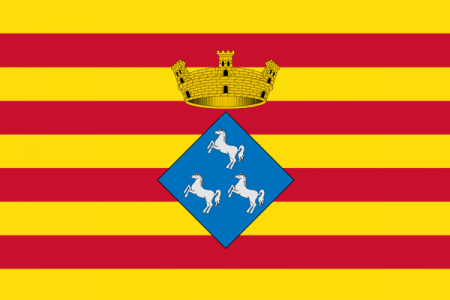
- Flag Coat of arms

- Location in Catalonia Viladecavalls (Spain)
- Coordinates: 41°33′28″N 1°57′21″E
- Country: Spain
- Autonomous community: Catalonia
- Province: Barcelona
- Comarca: Vallès Occidental

Government
  - Mayor: Cesca Berenguer Priego (2015)

Area
  - Total: 20.1 km^{2} (7.8 sq mi)
- Elevation: 274 m (899 ft)

Population (2025-01-01)
  - Total: 7,817
  - Density: 389/km^{2} (1,010/sq mi)
- Demonym: Vilacavallenc
- Postal code: 08232
- Website: www.viladecavalls.cat

Viladecavalls (Catalan pronunciation: [ˌbiləðəkəˈβaʎs]) is a municipality in the comarca of the Vallès Occidental in Catalonia, north-eastern Spain.
