= Polinyà =

- Municipality
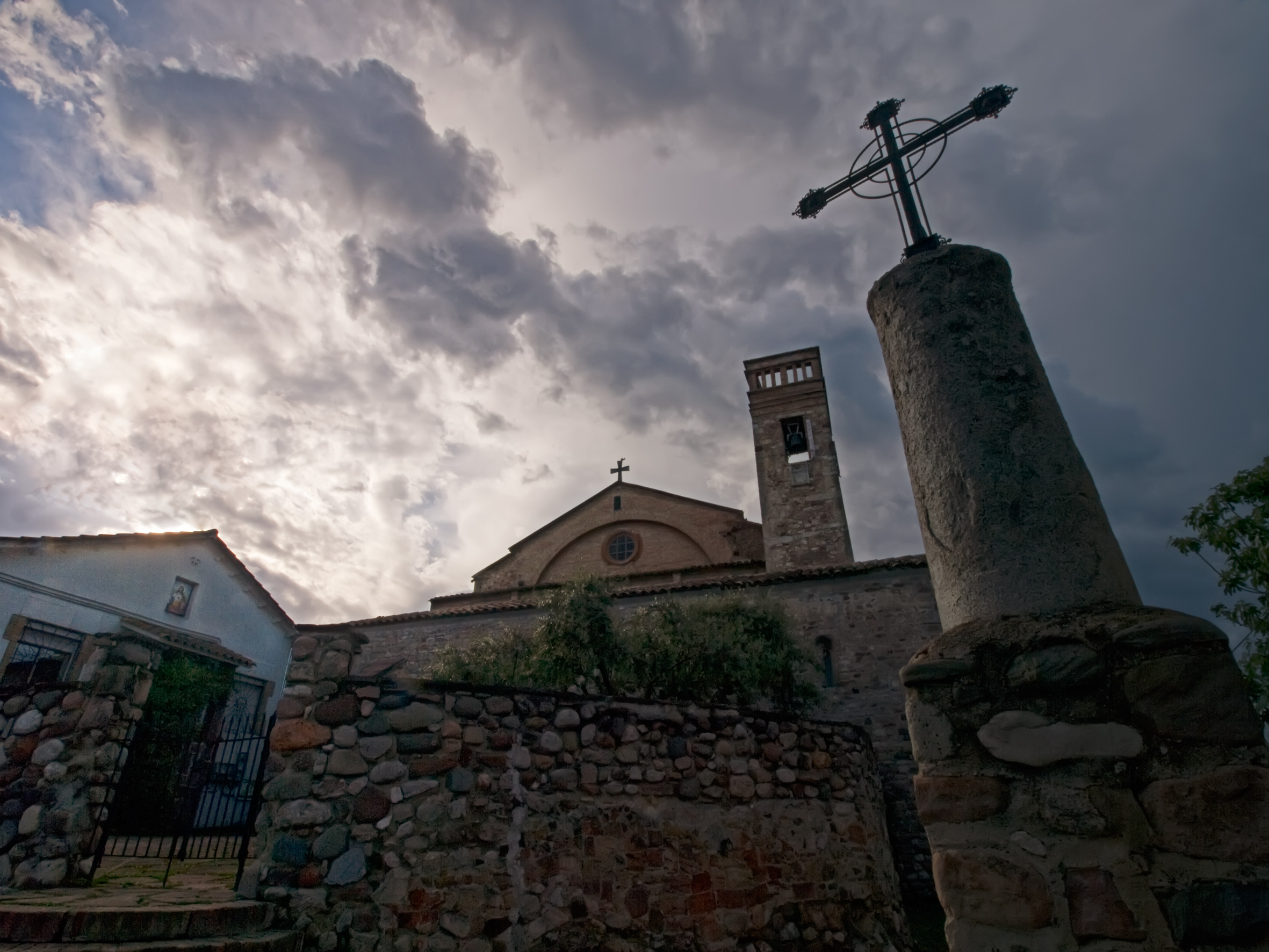
- Holy Saviour church

- Flag Coat of arms

- Location in Catalonia Polinyà (Spain)
- Coordinates: 41.558°N 2.158°E
- Country: Spain
- Community: Catalonia
- Province: Barcelona
- Comarca: Vallès Occidental

Government
  - Mayor: Javier Silva Pérez (2015)

Area
  - Total: 8.8 km^{2} (3.4 sq mi)

Population (2025-01-01)
  - Total: 8,581
  - Density: 980/km^{2} (2,500/sq mi)
- Website: polinya.cat

Polinyà (Catalan pronunciation: [puliˈɲa]) is a municipality in the province of Barcelona and autonomous community of Catalonia, Spain. The municipality covers an area of 8.8 square kilometres (3.4 sq mi) and the population in 2014 was 8,238.
