= Castellar del Vallès =

- Municipality
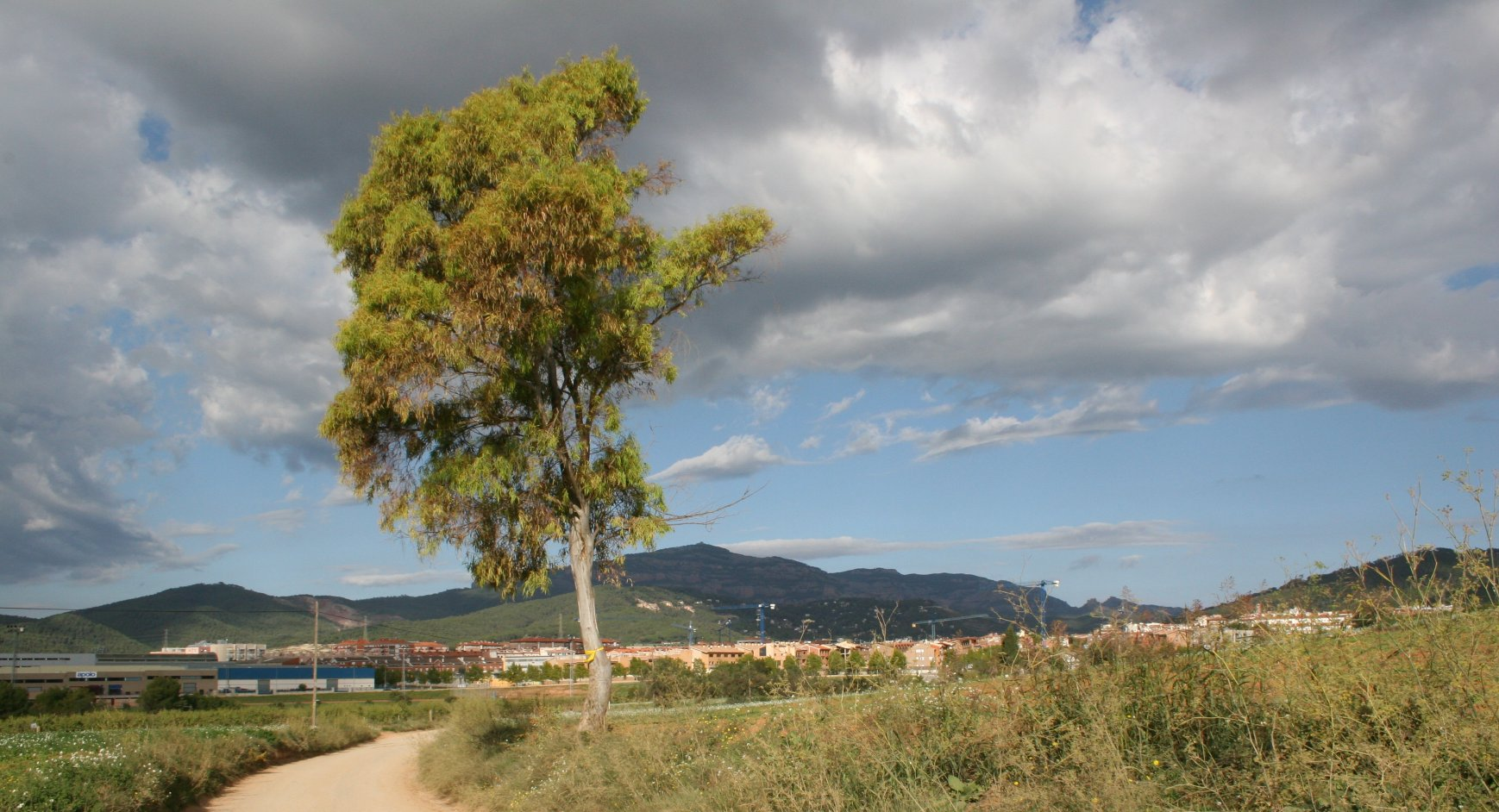
- Castellar del Valles and Sant Llorenç del Munt

- Flag Coat of arms

- Location in Barcelona province Castellar del Vallès (Spain)
- Coordinates: 41°37′3″N 2°5′17″E
- Country: Spain
- Autonomous community: Catalonia
- Province: Barcelona
- Comarca: Vallès Occidental
- Judicial district: Sabadell

Government
  - mayor: Ignasi Giménez Renom (2015) (PSC)

Area
  - Total: 44.9 km^{2} (17.3 sq mi)
- Elevation: 331 m (1,086 ft)

Population (2025-01-01)
  - Total: 25,422
  - Density: 566/km^{2} (1,470/sq mi)
- Demonym(s): Castellarenc, castellarenca
- Time zone: UTC+1 (CET)
  - Summer (DST): UTC+2 (CEST)
- Postal code: 08211
- Website: www.castellarvalles.cat

Castellar del Vallès (Catalan pronunciation: [kəstəˈʎa ðəl βəˈʎɛs]) is a Spanish municipality of Catalonia in the comarca of Vallès Occidental. It is located 7 km from Sabadell and 11 km from Terrassa, the comarca's two capitals. Other villages near Castellar del Vallès are Sant Llorenç Savall, Matadepera and Sentmenat.

== History ==
The first evidence of human presence dates to 7000 BCE, although there is evidence of agricultural activity in the Neolithic, around 5000 BCE. The continuation of human presence is confirmed by twentieth one of funereal urns dated in the 7th century BCE, which were located in the Plan of La Bruguera, in the municipal term with formed posterity, for a small necropolis of the age of the iron.

In 2005, the remodelling of the centre of Castellar revealed archaeological finds that confirm the presence of a city of late Roman period, with funereal remains and others related with agricultural activity in the 4th and 5th centuries, later substituted by a Visigothic settlement in the 6th to 13th centuries.

A part of the original village of Castellar Vell, excavated between 1995 and 2001, dates to the Carolingian period. A cemetery was located here, with 250 burials of the 11th, 12th and 13th centuries.

The people of the village have been traditionally tied to the marquises of Castellar, who now live in Barcelona.

From 1968 to 2006 there were 181 forest fires or attempts at fires, affecting an area of 470.8 hectares. The largest fire during this period took place in July 1983, and burned 75 hectares in the Old Shoemaker region. There have been 23 fires in the last 10 years, affecting 5.7 hectares; these are much smaller than the great forest fire of Sant Llorenç de Savall in August 2003, where 2,953.85 hectares burned.

The largest snowfalls in this area came in 1962 and 2001, and there was an historic flood in September 1962, which damaged the Tolrà factory in Can Barba, the bridge over the Brunet and farmland near the Ripoll river.

== Economy ==
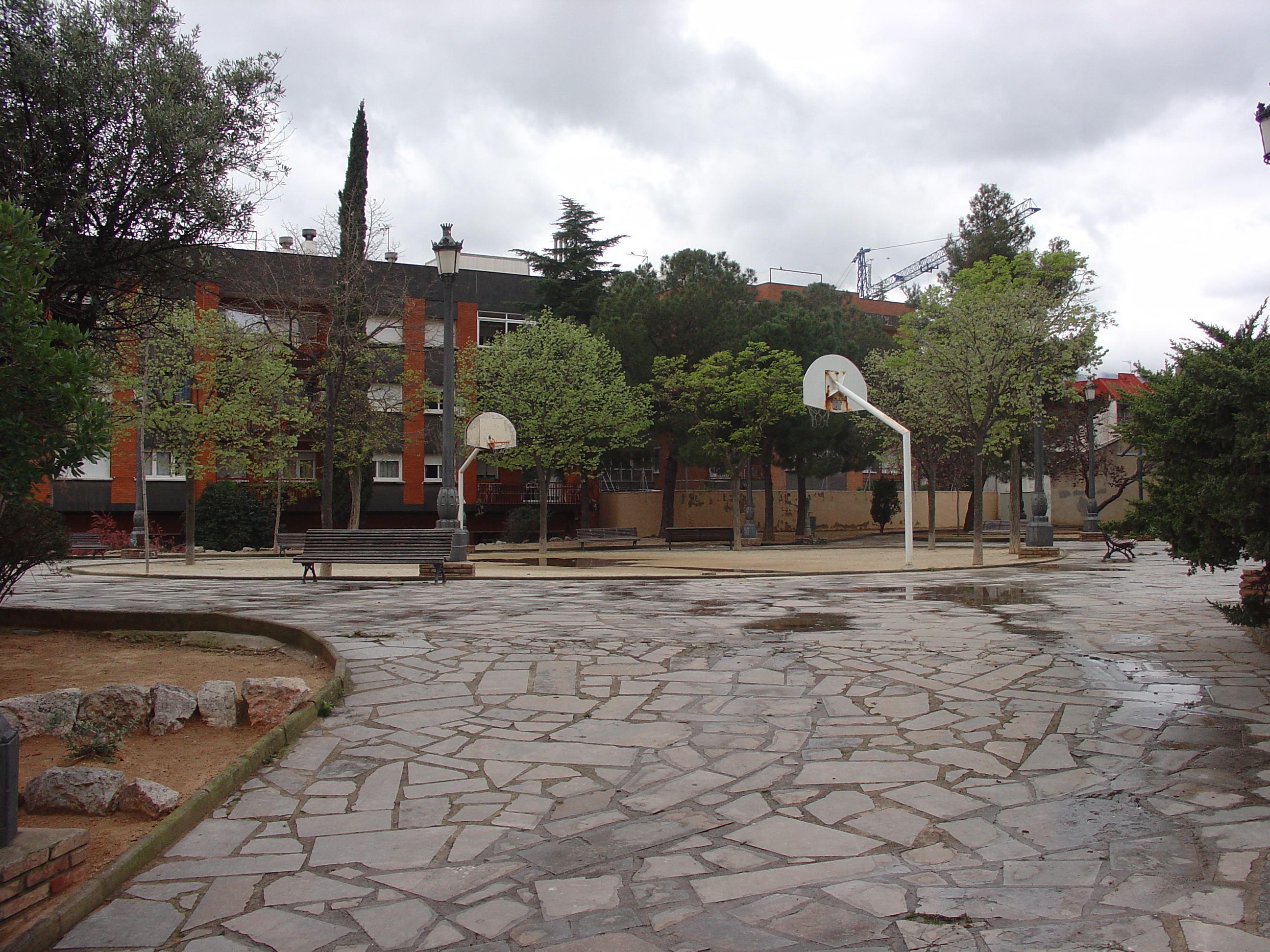
La Plaça Llibertat (Freedom Square)

Traditionally the main economical source of Castellar del Vallès has been agriculture. It is based on typical Mediterranean crops (wine, olives, wheat, dried fruit and nuts) complemented by products of the vegetable garden. Linen and hemp have been grown on the banks of the Ripoll river since the Middle Ages.

From the 19th century an unstoppable process of industrialization being profitable exploited the power of the Ripoll river, first manufacturing wool, then cotton and continuing until the 20th century as industrial development kept on converting agricultural land into built-up areas or industrial estates, leaving agriculture as a residual economical activity. An increasingly important tertiary sector has converted the economy of Castellar into that typical of a post-industrial society.

The industrial development of Castellar del Vallès has been a lot joined to that of the textile company Tolrà, for the number of jobs as well as for the contributions of patronage of this family to the seat|town. The town counts on two industrial estates in where 5,000 persons (highlighting the companies of the sector metallurgical and of the wood) work. Another important sector is that of the services.

== Transport ==
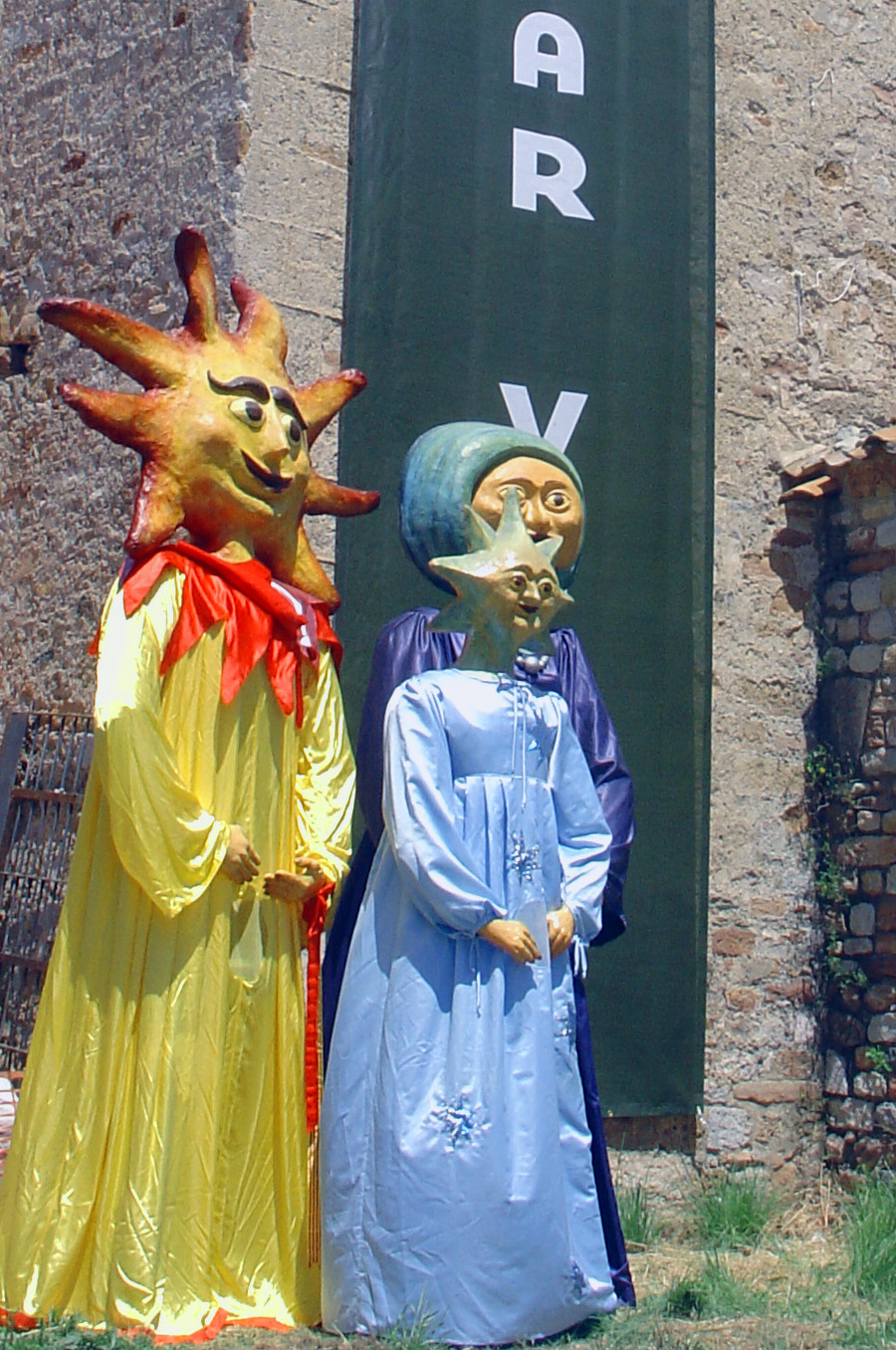
The Castellar's Giants called Sol (Sun) and Lluna (Moon) and their daughter Estel (Star)

Castellar has two main roads, the C-1415a, which joins the town to Sentmenat and Matadepera, and the B124, which connects Sabadell and Sant Llorenç Savall. At the moment there are two bus routes which serve the town, to Sagalés and Sarbus.

== Politics ==
Castellar del Vallès had a mayor of the Convergence and Union coalition (CiU) until 2007, even though a coalition between the Socialists' Party of Catalonia (PSC) and the Unified Socialist Party of Catalonia had won the first local elections since the re-establishment of democracy. During the 1999-2003 legislature and in spite of an absolute majority, Lluís Maria Corominas i Díaz arrived at a pact with the Republican Left of Catalonia (ERC) and PSC. The CIU party still governs, despite its loss of majority in the elections of 2003.

== Sport clubs ==
- Club Bàsquet Castellar (Basketball)
- Club Patinatge de Castellar del Vallès (Skate Rolling)
- Club Atlètic Castellar (Athletics)
- Club Tennis Castellar del Vallès (Tennis)
- Unió Esportiva Castellar (Soccer)
- Club Hoquei Castellar (Rolling Hockey)
- Futbol Sala Castellar (Indoor Soccer)

== Village schools ==
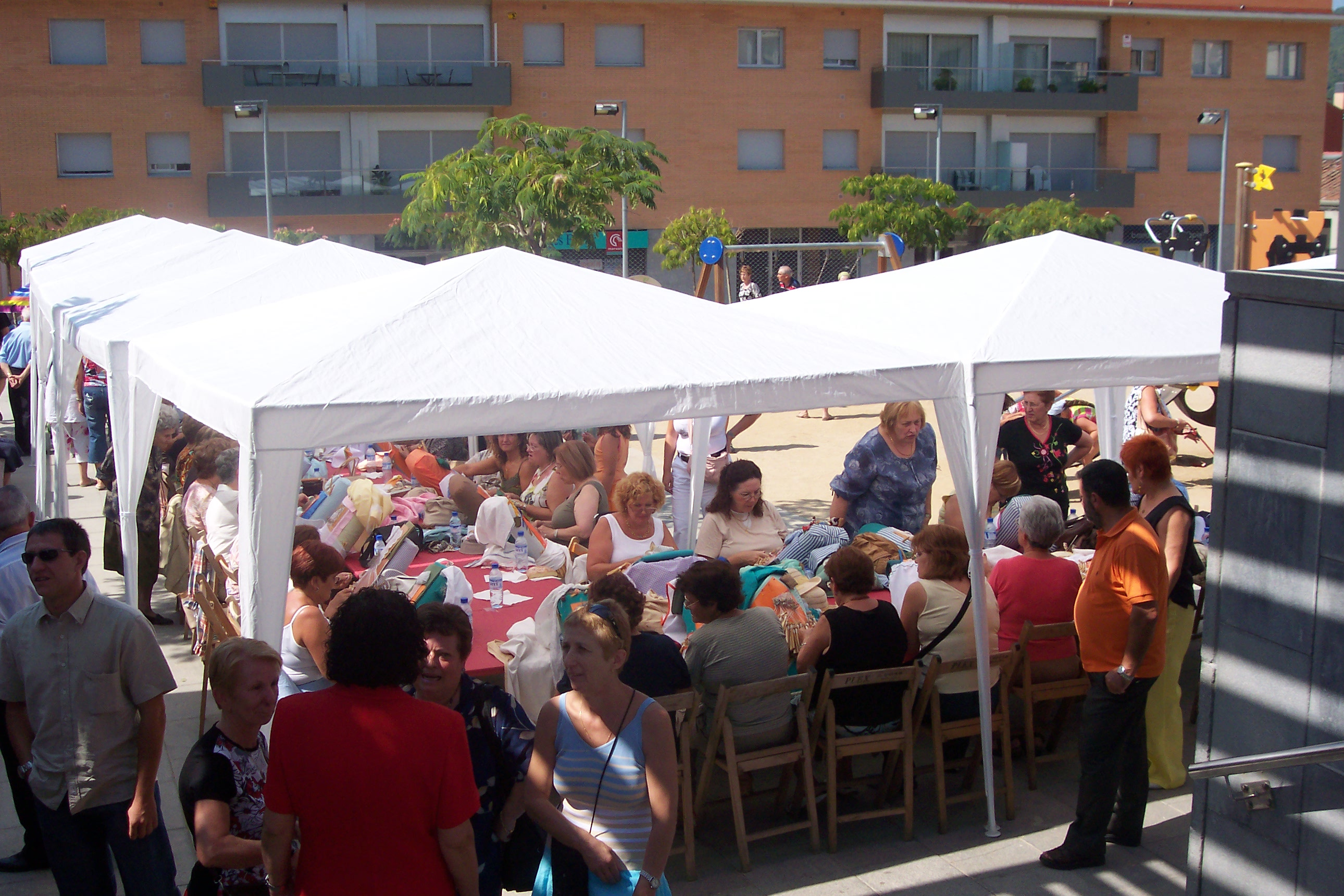
2007 Encounter of Lacemakers

- CEIP Sant Esteve
- CEIP Mestre Plà
- CEIP Emili Carles
- CEIP El Casal
- CEIP Bonavista
- CEIP Joan Blanquer
- CEIP El Sol i la Lluna
- CEIP La Immaculada
- IES Castellar
- IES Puig de la Creu

== Companies ==
- CELO
- DigiProces

== Notable people ==
- Daniel Pedrosa: World Champion of Motorcycle(250cc,125cc).
- José Eduardo González Navas: Catalan politician.
- Gemma Modinos: neuropsychologist.
- Joan Blanquer i Penedès: Catalan filmmaker.
