= Gemma Modinos =

Spanish neuropsychologist

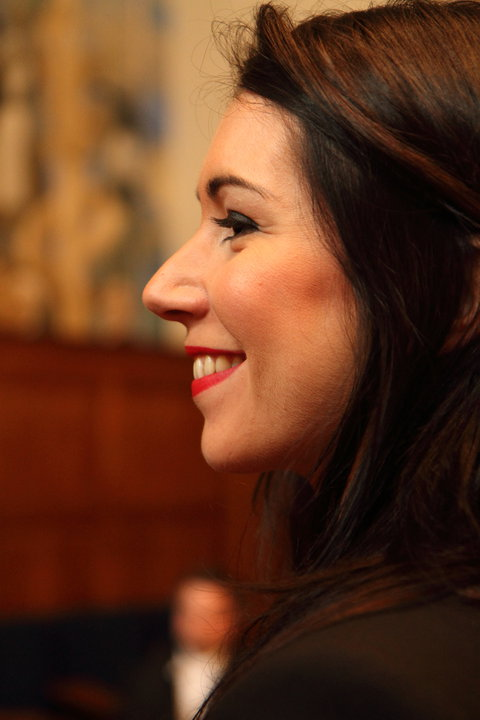
- Born: 1980 (age 45–46); Castellar del Vallès (Barcelona, Spain)
- Awards: 2023 SIRS Research Excellence Award 2020 BAP Senior Non-Clinical Psychopharmacology Award 2019 SIRS Rising Star Award
- Scientific career
- Fields: neuroscience and mental health
- Workplaces: King's College London (professor, group leader)

Gemma Modinos, born 1980 in Castellar del Vallès, is a Catalan, Spanish and British neuropsychologist. She works as a Professor of Neuroscience & Mental Health at the Institute of Psychiatry, Psychology and Neuroscience of King's College London. She was a Wellcome Trust & The Royal Society Sir Henry Dale Fellow (2017-2023) and is a Group leader at the MRC Centre for Neurodevelopmental Disorders at King's College London. She was 2020-2022 Chair of the Young Academy of Europe, where she directed European efforts to optimise science policy from a youthful perspective; and 2020-2022 Junior Member of the Executive Board of the Schizophrenia International Research Society. She is known for her work revealing the role of emotion-related brain systems and the neurotransmitters GABA and glutamate in the development of psychosis, and investigating how targeting these mechanisms may help design new therapeutic strategies.

== Early life ==
She earned a BSc in Psychology at the Autonomous University of Barcelona, followed by an MSc in Applied Neurosciences at the University of Barcelona (Catalonia, Spain) while she worked as clinical neuropsychologist at Fundació ACE. She then moved to the Netherlands to do a PhD in Neuroscience at the University of Groningen. She performed her post-doctoral training at the Department of Psychosis Studies at the Institute of Psychiatry, Psychology and Neuroscience (IoPPN), King's College London.

== Career ==
In 2013, Modinos received a Brain & Behavior Research Foundation Young Investigator Award to examine the relationship between functional MRI activation during emotion processing and glutamate levels in healthy people with high schizotypy. In 2016, she was awarded a King's Prize Fellowship and a Wellcome Trust & The Royal Society Sir Henry Dale Fellowship, allowing her to open her own lab at IoPPN. In 2018 she founded and is since chair of the worldwide neuroimaging consortium ENIGMA Schizotypy. Since 2024 she is a Professor of Neuroscience & Mental Health in the Department of Psychological Medicine at the IoPPN. Modinos was elected Member of the Academia Europaea in 2024.

== Top 5 publications ==
- Modinos et al. (2020) Association of Adverse Outcomes With Emotion Processing and Its Neural Substrate in Individuals at Clinical High Risk for Psychosis. JAMA Psychiatry. 2020;77(2):190-200.
- Modinos et al. (2018) Prefrontal GABA levels, hippocampal resting perfusion and the risk of psychosis. Neuropsychopharmacology. 2018;43:2652–2659.
- Modinos et al. (2017) Corticolimbic hyper-response to emotion and glutamatergic function in people with high schizotypy: a multimodal fMRI-MRS study. Translational Psychiatry. 2017;7:e1083.
- Modinos, Paul Allen, Anthony A. Grace, Philip McGuire (2015) Translating the MAM Model of Psychosis to Humans. Trends in Neurosciences. 2015;38(3):129-138.
- Modinos, Johan Ormel, André Aleman (2010). Individual differences in dispositional mindfulness and brain activity involved in reappraisal of emotion. Social Cognitive and Affective Neuroscience, 5(4);369-377.
