= Serra de Granera =

Mountain range in Spain

Coordinates: 41°44′18″N 2°03′49″E

La Serra de Granera, with respect to the homonymous term

The Serra de Granera (Catalan pronunciation: [ˈsɛrə ðə ɣɾəˈneɾə]) is a mountain range located between the Vallès Occidental and Vallès Oriental comarcas in Catalonia, Spain.
