= Ullastrell =

- Municipality
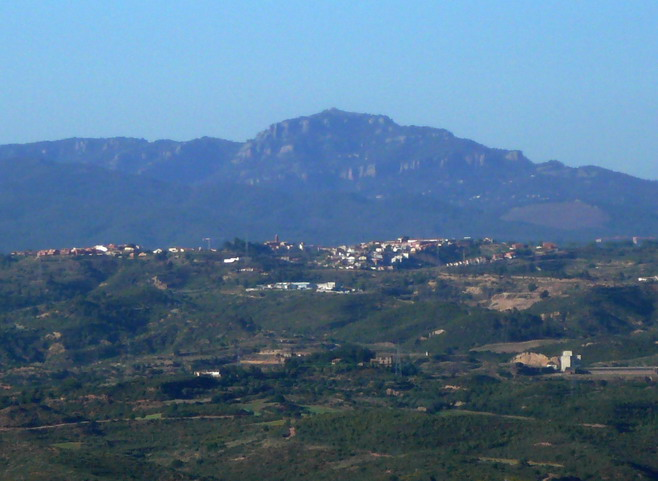
- Ullastrell

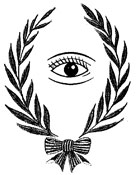
- Coat of arms

- Location in Catalonia Ullastrell (Spain)
- Coordinates: 41°32′N 1°57′E
- Country: Spain
- Community: Catalonia
- Province: Barcelona
- Comarca: Vallès Occidental

Government
  - Mayor: Joan Ballbè Herrero (2015)

Area
  - Total: 7.3 km^{2} (2.8 sq mi)

Population (2025-01-01)
  - Total: 2,171
  - Density: 300/km^{2} (770/sq mi)
- Website: www.ullastrell.cat

Ullastrell (Catalan pronunciation: [uʎəsˈtɾeʎ]) is a village in the province of Barcelona and autonomous community of Catalonia, Spain. The population in 2014 was 2,056.
