= Riera de Rubí =

A stream in Vallès Occidental

Rubí stream
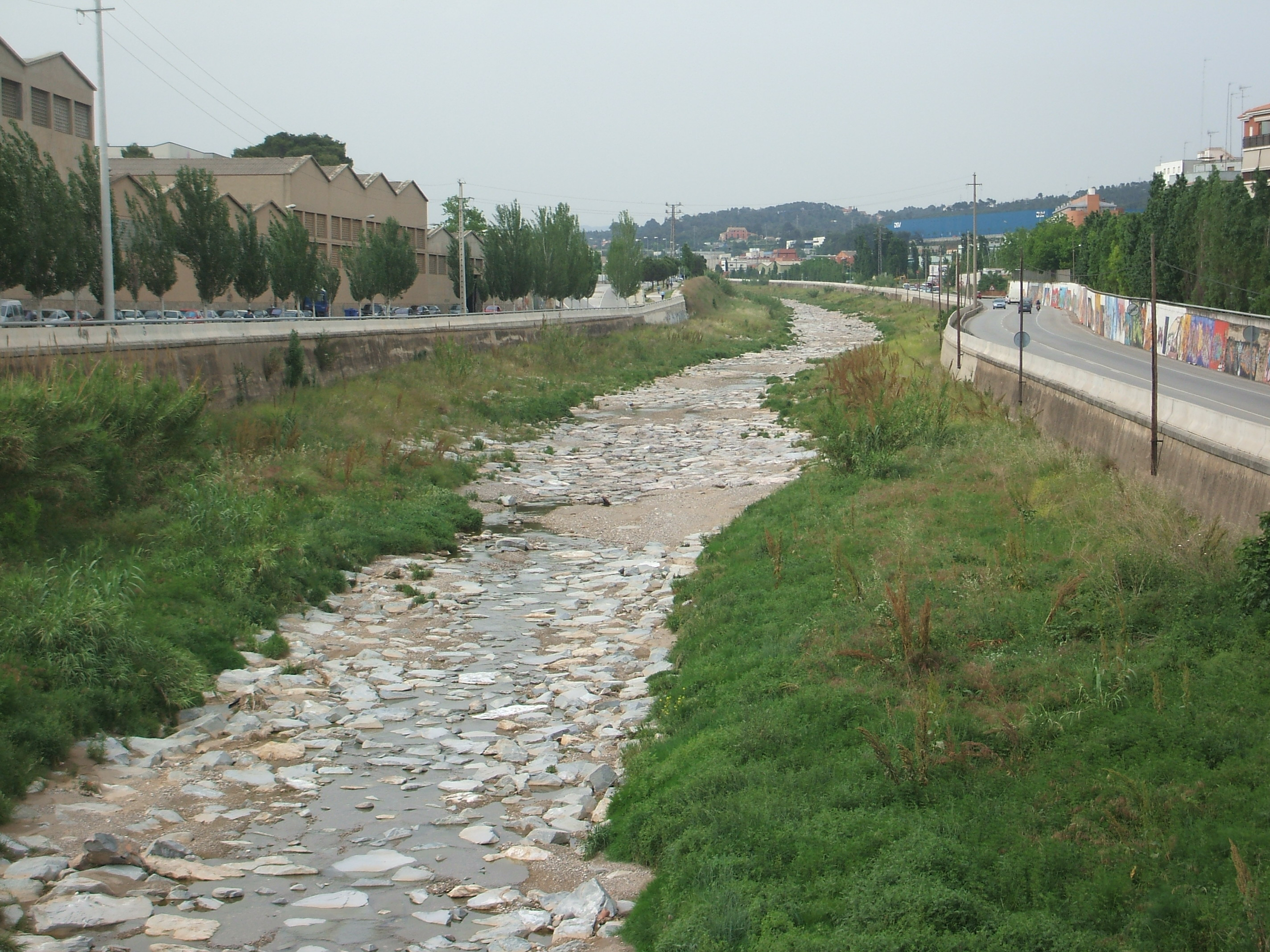
- The stream nearby the city of Rubi

Details
- Location: Vallès Occidental
- Coordinates: 41° 27′ 46.48″ N, 2° 0′ 35.14″ E 41.46291, 2.00976
- Length: 13.5 km

The Rubí stream (Spanish: Riera de Rubí) is a watercourse in the Vallès Occidental that passes through Rubí. It is a tributary, on the left,of the Llobregat, a river into which it drains near the Papiol, in the Baix Llobregat.

== Route ==
It originates when the Arenes stream receives the Palau stream on the right a little above Les Fonts, in the municipality of Terrassa, and in the municipality of Rubí it reaches several torrents from the northern mountains, including those of Can Balasc and Can Canyadell, which delimit the limit of the municipality with Castellbisbal, and those of Can Tallafigueres, Can Xercavins, Can Pi de la Serra, Sant Muç, Can Ramoneda and Can Solà. On the south bank there is the torrent dels Alous and the torrent de Can Ferran, which mark the border between Sant Cugat del Vallès and Rubí.

== History ==
In 1860 the first stone bridge was built in Rubí, with three eyes, to connect the village with the farmland and farmhouses located in the fields on the other side of the stream, and after expropriating several lands, in 1884 the course of the stream was diverted to the west to be able to incorporate the lands of the Parellada del Castell de Rubí into the village, and in 1897, on the initiative of the Ribas brothers, a suspension bridge was built. On September 25, 1962, the flooding of the waters from the Arenes stream due to very intense rains caused catastrophic effects as it passed through the Vallès, with more than 700 deaths. The stream had diverted the water from causing destruction.
