= Sentmenat =

- Municipality
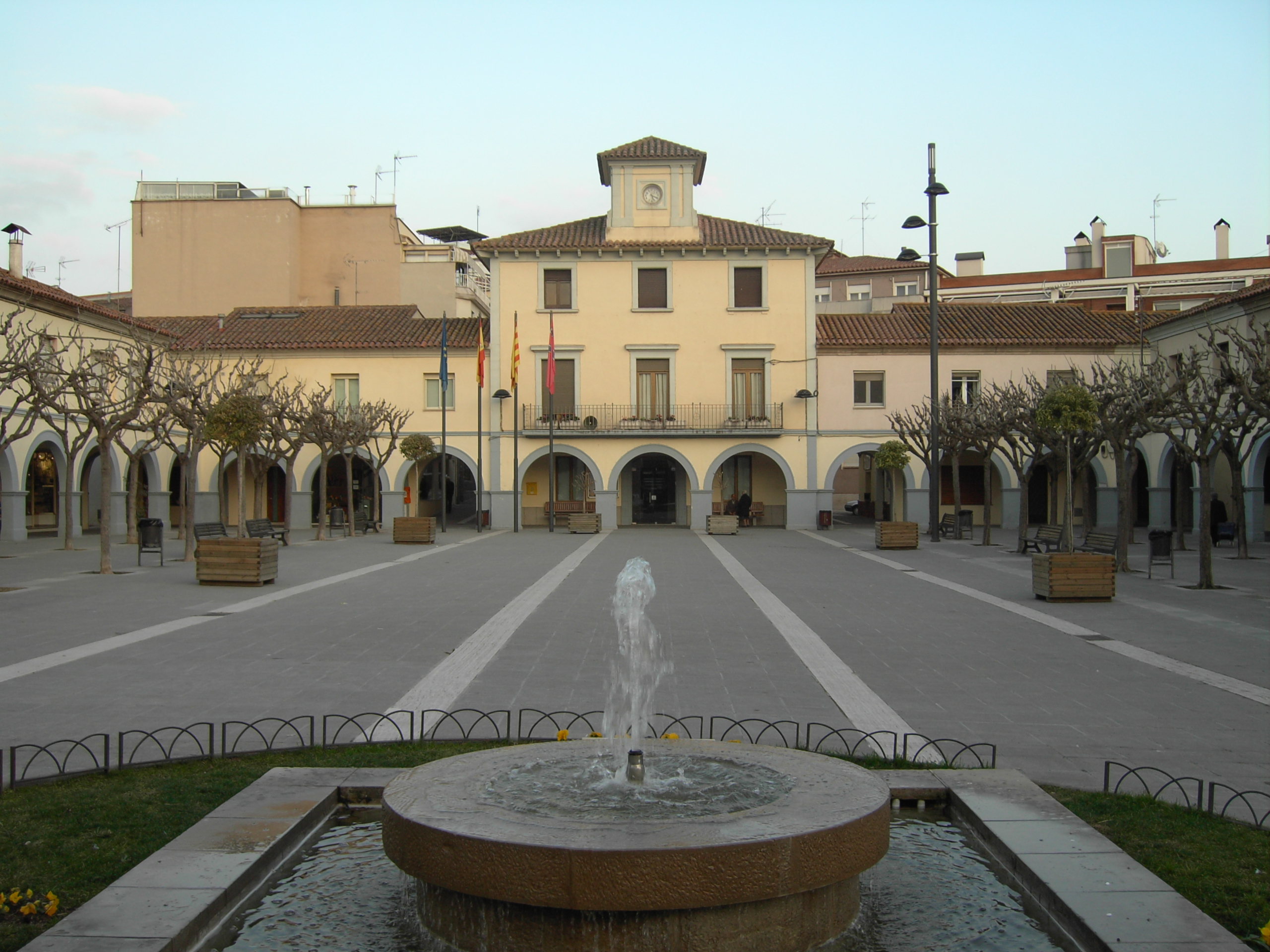

- Flag Coat of arms

- Location in Catalonia Sentmenat (Spain)
- Coordinates: 41°36′33″N 2°8′13″E
- Country: Spain
- Autonomous community: Catalonia
- Province: Barcelona
- Comarca: Vallès Occidental

Government
  - Mayor: Marc Verneda Urbano (2015)

Area
  - Total: 28.8 km^{2} (11.1 sq mi)
- Elevation: 213 m (699 ft)

Population (2025-01-01)
  - Total: 9,548
  - Density: 332/km^{2} (859/sq mi)
- Demonym(s): Sentmenatencs (ca); Sentmenatense (es)
- Postal code: 08181
- Website: sentmenat.cat

Sentmenat (Catalan pronunciation: [səmːəˈnat]) is a municipality in the comarca of the Vallès Occidental in Catalonia.
