= Barberà del Vallès =

- Municipality
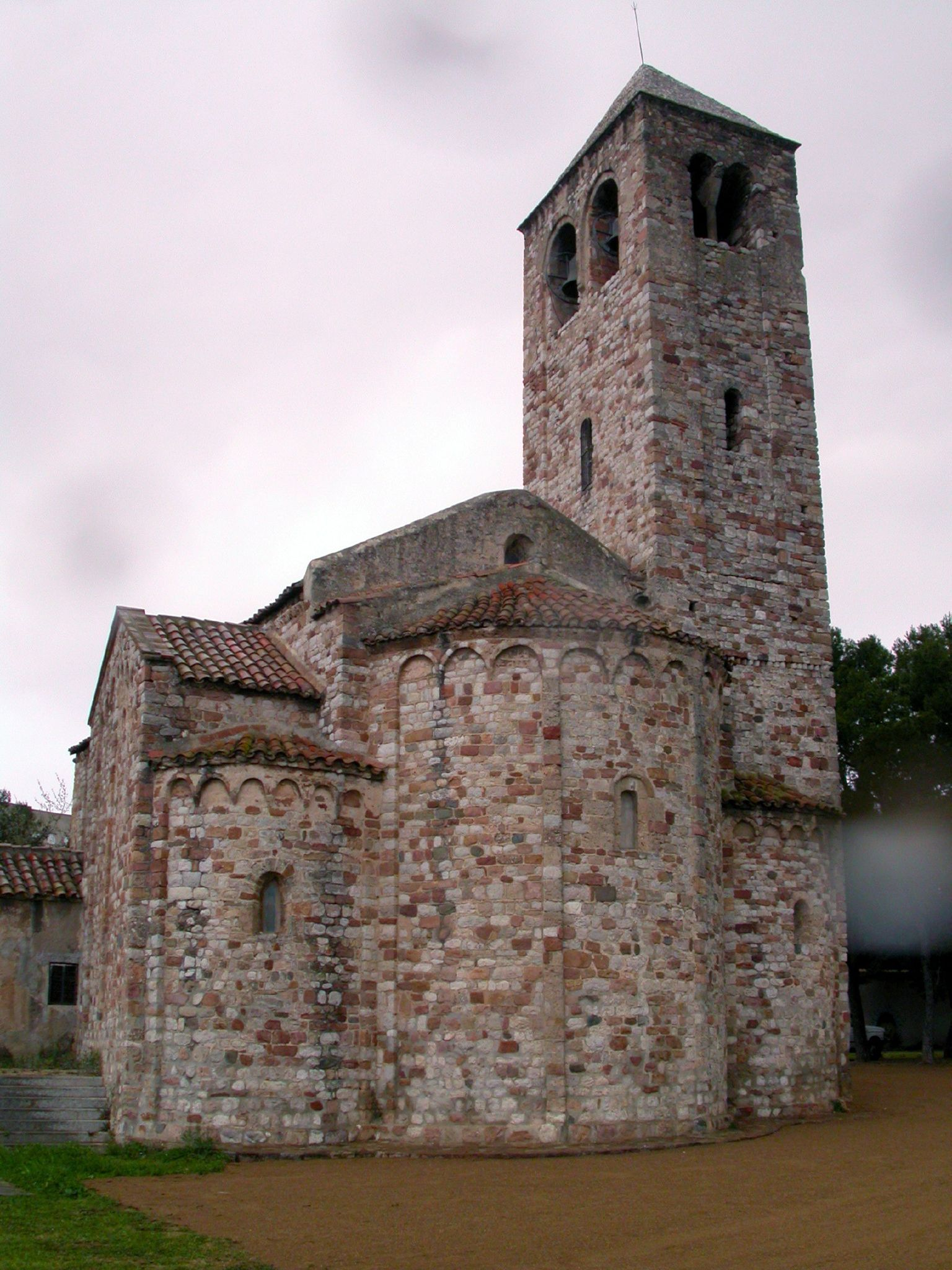
- Church of Santa Maria de Barberà

- Flag Coat of arms

- Location in Catalonia Barberà del Vallès (Spain)
- Coordinates: 41°30′59″N 2°07′28″E
- Country: Spain
- Community: Catalonia
- Province: Barcelona
- Comarca: Vallès Occidental

Government
  - Mayor: Xavier Garcés (2019)

Area
  - Total: 8.3 km^{2} (3.2 sq mi)
- Elevation: 146 m (479 ft)

Population (2025-01-01)
  - Total: 33,987
  - Density: 4,100/km^{2} (11,000/sq mi)
- Demonym: Barberenc
- Postal code: 08210
- Website: www.bdv.cat

Barberà del Vallès (Catalan pronunciation: [bəɾβəˈɾa ðəl βəˈʎɛs]) is a municipality in the comarca of the Vallès Occidental, in Catalonia, Spain. It is situated in the valley of the Ripoll river to the south of Sabadell, about 17 kilometers from Barcelona. It is integrated in the Metropolitan Area of Barcelona.

== Present ==
Barberà del Vallès is a city of more than 30,000 people. In the industrial field, it is one of the main cities of the region of Western Valley (Vallés Occidental), with a clear division between the urban and industrial area. The population of the city, enlarged by the internal migration movements in the Spain of the sixties, is varied and promotes cultural and folkloric associations. This can be seen in the April Fair (Feria de Abril), held until the 1980s in Barberà del Vallès, until economic reasons moved it to other locations in the Barcelona metropolitan area.

Barbera in 1985 celebrated its millennium, which coincided with the opening of the Millennium Square in the vicinity of La Romànica, with balconies to Ripoll river and its riverside park.

== Demography ==
Years	1900	1930	1960	1970	1990	1995	2010	2015
Population	780	1638	2.662	8378	31370	24.682	31.688	32.545

== Notable people ==
- Agus Medina (born 1994), professional footballer
