= Joan Blanquer i Penedès =

Joan Blanquer
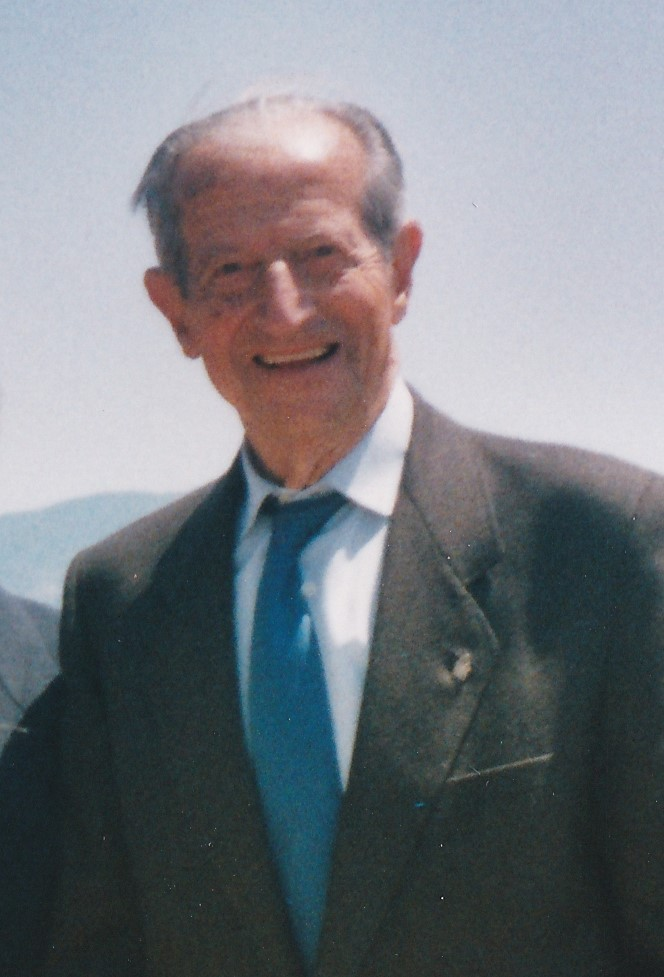
- Born: Joan Blanquer i Penedès; 1912; Castellar del Vallès, Spain
- Occupation(s): Film director Screenwriter

Joan Blanquer i Panadès (1912 in Castellar del Vallès, Spain – 2002 in Sabadell, Spain) was an administrative officer by trade and a filmmaker, scriptwriter, and Catalan teacher. He published several award-winning scripts for amateur films in the magazine Otro cine, published in Barcelona. He worked for the advancement of Catalan in multiple activities at cultural institutions: staged readings of contemporary plays, lectures, research into the lives of local historical characters, Catalan courses, and so on.
