= Mura, Spain =

Mura
- Municipality
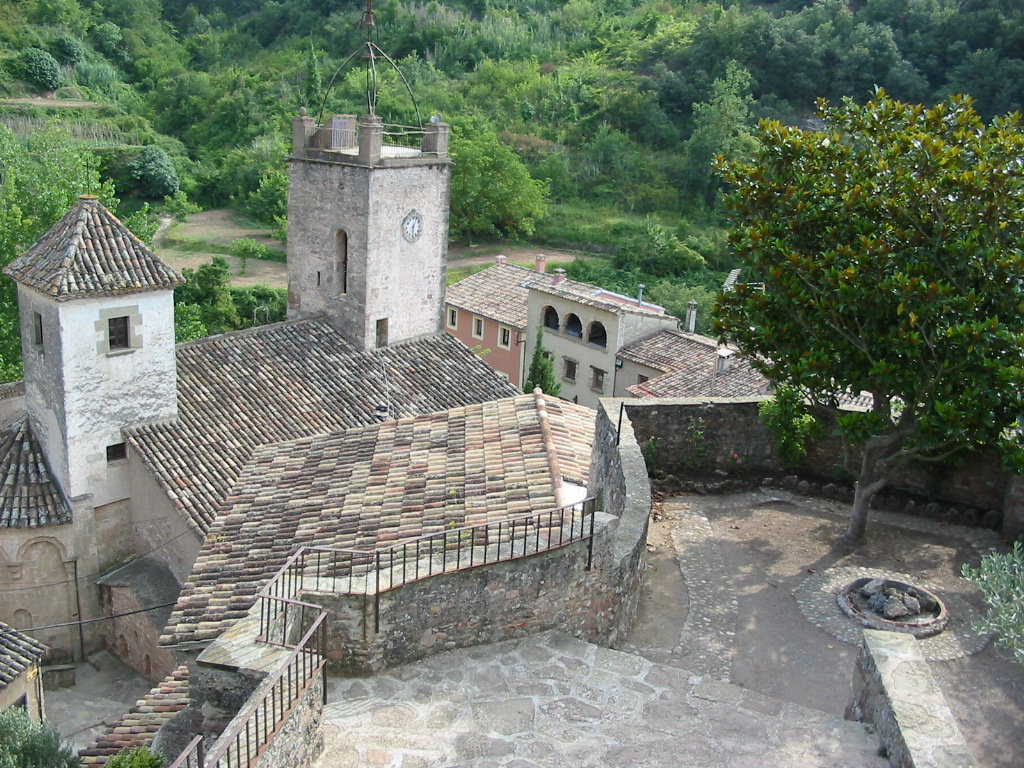
- Saint Martin's church

- Flag Coat of arms

- Location in Catalonia Mura (Spain)
- Coordinates: 41°42′N 1°59′E
- Country: Spain
- Community: Catalonia
- Province: Barcelona
- Comarca: Bages

Government
  - Mayor: Martí Perich Singla (2015)

Area
  - Total: 47.8 km^{2} (18.5 sq mi)

Population (2025-01-01)
  - Total: 235
  - Density: 4.92/km^{2} (12.7/sq mi)
- Website: www.mura.cat

Mura (Catalan pronunciation: [ˈmuɾə]) is a municipality in the province of Barcelona and autonomous community of Catalonia, Spain. The municipality covers an area of 47.78 square kilometres (18.45 sq mi) and the population in 2014 was 211.
