= Ignasi Giménez Renom =

Spanish mayor

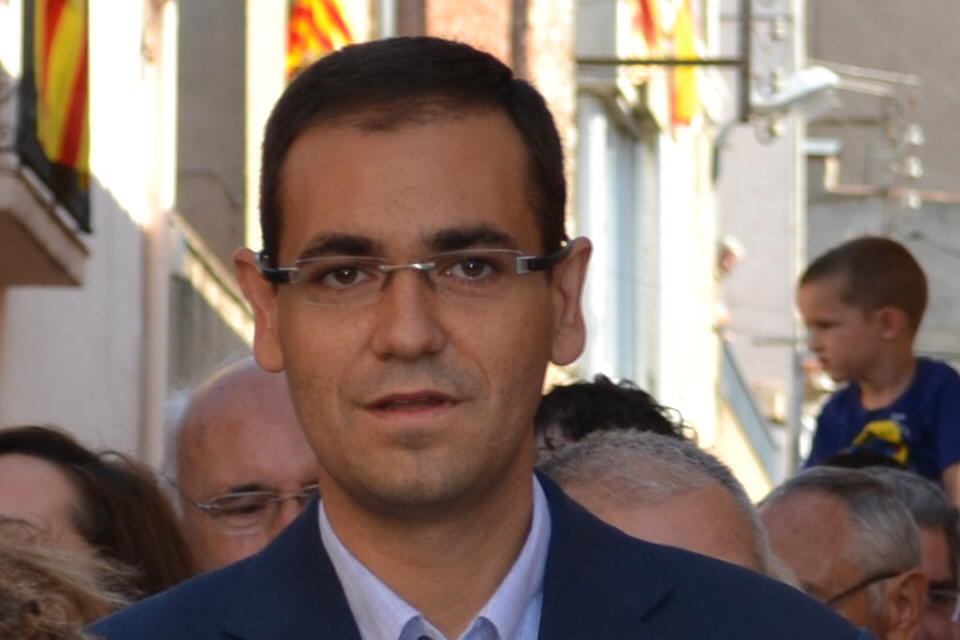

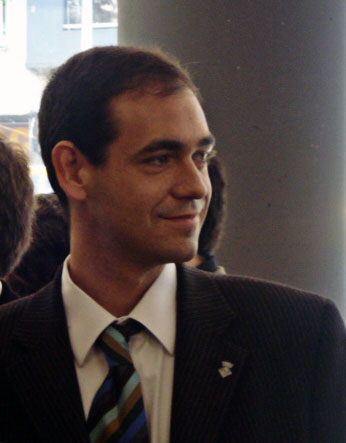

Ignasi Giménez Renom (Castellar del Vallès, October 29, 1979) was the mayor of Castellar del Vallès from 2007 and president of the Consell Comarcal del Vallès Occidental from 2015 until his resignation from the position in December 2024.

He holds a degree in philosophy from the UAB and has worked as a journalist at Ràdio Barcelona.

At the end of 2000, he joined the Socialist Party of Catalonia, and in the municipal elections of 2003, he became a councilor for Castellar del Vallès representing this political party. In late October 2004, he was elected first secretary of the local group, and in 2005, he was chosen as the mayoral candidate for the municipal elections of May 2007, heading the PSC list that included former Parliament of Catalonia deputy Pepe Gonzàlez in the third position.

On May 27, 2007, the PSC-PM became the most voted political force, with 41.25% of the votes and 10 councilors. On June 16, 2007, Ignasi Giménez became the sixth mayor of Castellar del Vallès since the restoration of democracy, leading a single-party government of the Socialists. During his term, his government launched L'Actual de Castellar del Vallès, completed the controversial works on Plaça Major, secured a positive decision from the Government of Catalonia for the arrival of the Catalan Railways to the town, established a sister-city relationship with Carcassonne, among other accomplishments.

On February 12, 2011, Giménez was selected to lead the Socialist candidacy for mayor of Castellar del Vallès in the 2011 municipal elections, which he won by absolute majority, obtaining 50.14% of the votes and 13 councilors, becoming the mayor with the most support since the restoration of democracy in Castellar del Vallès. On July 15, 2011, he was elected provincial deputy of the Barcelona Provincial Council.

In the following term, Giménez was re-elected as mayor of Castellar del Vallès and president of the Consell Comarcal del Vallès Occidental, roles he held until his resignation in December 2024.
