= Sant Llorenç del Munt =

Mountain in Spain

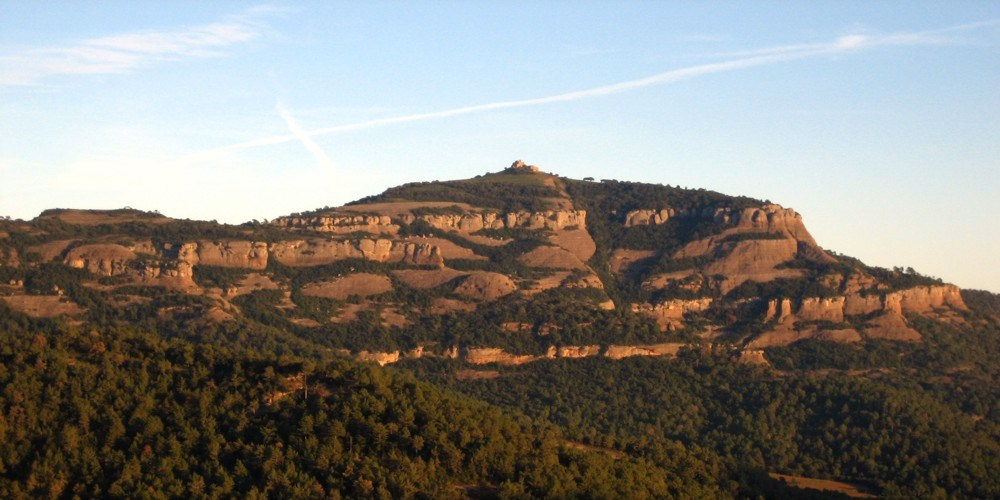
- La Mola with the monastery on top

Highest point
- Elevation: 1,104 m (3,622 ft)
- Coordinates: 41°38′29″N 02°01′05″E

Geography
- Location: Bages, Vallès Occidental, Catalonia
- Parent range: Catalan Pre-Coastal Range

Geology
- Mountain type: Conglomerate

Climbing
- First ascent: Unknown
- Easiest route: Camí dels Monjos from Sant Cugat del Vallès

Sant Llorenç del Munt is a largely rocky mountain massif in central Catalonia, Spain. The highest summit, where the Monestir de Sant Llorenç del Munt is located, has an elevation of 1,104.2 metres (3,623 ft) above sea level and is known as La Mola. Montcau 1,056.8 metres (3,467 ft) is another important peak of the massif. On the massif, there is a protected area under the name Parc Natural de Sant Llorenç del Munt i l'Obac.

== See also ==
- Mountains of Catalonia
- Catalan symbols
