= Montcau =

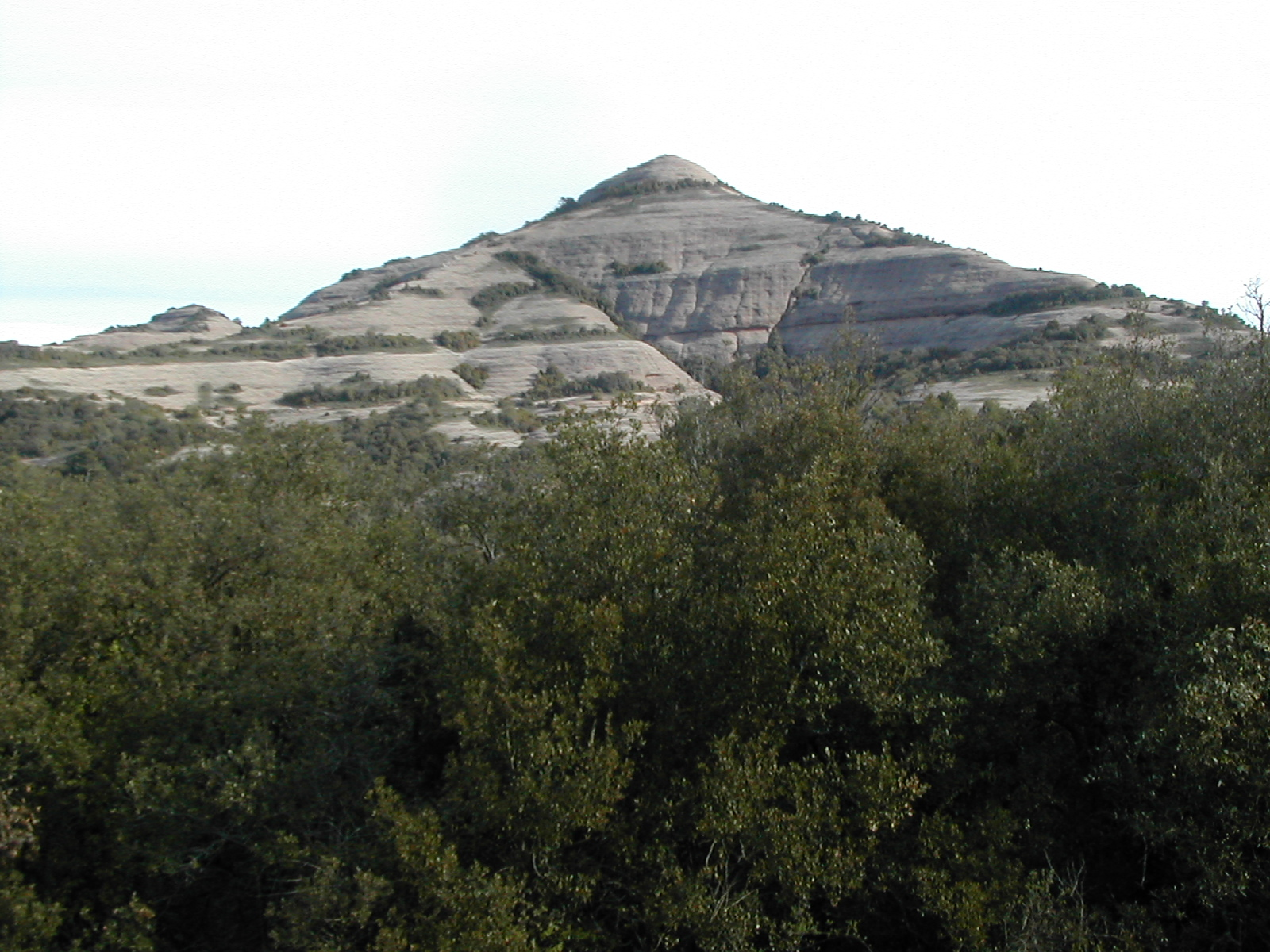

Highest point
- Elevation: 1,056 m (3,465 ft)
- Listing: Mountains in Catalonia
- Coordinates: 41°40′30″N 2°00′17″E

Geography
- Location within Spain
- Location: Bages, Vallès Occidental, Catalonia
- Parent range: Sant Llorenç del Munt

Geology
- Mountain type: Conglomerate

Climbing
- First ascent: Unknown
- Easiest route: From Coll d'Estenalles through Coll d'Estella and Coll d'Eres

Montcau is a mountain of Catalonia, Spain. It has an elevation of 1,056 metres (3,465 ft) above sea level. This mountain is part of the Sant Llorenç del Munt massif. It is accessible from Terrassa, Navarcles or Sant Llorenç Savall.

== See also ==
- Catalan Pre-Coastal Range
