= Vallès Occidental =

Coordinates: 41°33′50″N 2°02′23″E

- Comarca
- Country: Spain
- Autonomous community: Catalonia
- Province: Barcelona
- Region: Àmbit metropolità de Barcelona
- Capital: Sabadell and Terrassa
- Municipalities: List: Badia del Vallès, Barberà del Vallès, Castellar del Vallès, Castellbisbal, Cerdanyola del Vallès, Gallifa, Matadepera, Montcada i Reixac, Palau-solità i Plegamans, Polinyà, Rellinars, Ripollet, Rubí, Sabadell, Sant Cugat del Vallès, Sant Llorenç Savall, Sant Quirze del Vallès, Santa Perpètua de Mogoda, Sentmenat, Terrassa, Ullastrell, Vacarisses, Viladecavalls

Government
  - Body: Vallès Occidental Comarcal Council
  - President: Xavier Garcés (PSC) (2024–present)

Area
  - Total: 583.1 km^{2} (225.1 sq mi)

Population (2014)
  - Total: 899,532
  - Density: 1,543/km^{2} (3,996/sq mi)
- Demonym
- Time zone: UTC+1 (CET)
  - Summer (DST): UTC+2 (CEST)
- Largest municipality: Terrassa
- Website: www.ccvoc.cat

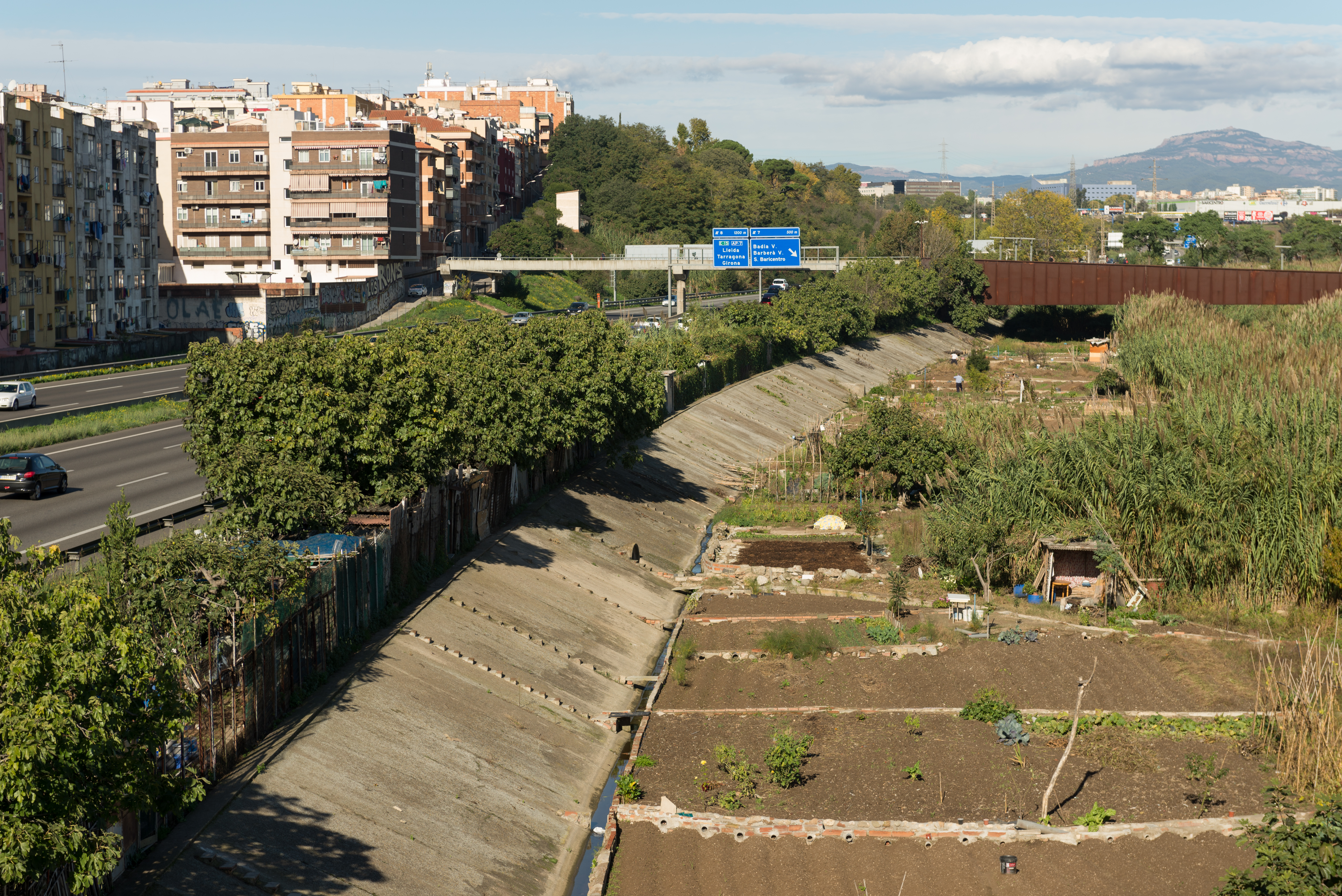
Riu Ripoll

Vallès Occidental (Catalan: [bəˈʎɛz uksiðənˈtal], Spanish: [baˈʎes oɣθiðenˈtal]) is a comarca (county) in the Barcelona region in Catalonia, Spain. It has two capitals, Sabadell and Terrassa. Along with Vallès Oriental, it forms the historical Vallès region.

== Physical geography ==
Vallès Occidental borders the comarques of Bages (to the north), Vallès Oriental (to the north and east), Baix Llobregat (to the west), and Barcelonès (to the south). It centers on the Catalan prelittoral depression, limited to the west by the River Llobregat and to the east by the River Caldes. The northern part of the comarca is mountainous. From west to east, it contains part of the Obac range (924m altitude at Castellsapera); the massifs of Sant Llorenç de Munt (1095m at La Mola and 1053m at Montcau) and Puig de la Creu (664m); and the Sant Sadurní (954m) and Farell cliffs (789m). At the south of the comarca is the Collserola range (512m), which forms part of the Catalan Littoral. Between these various ranges is the valley that gives its name to the comarca. The valley actually composes two separate watersheds, the basins of the Llobregat and Besòs.

The Llobregat watershed lies to the west of the axis that runs from Obac to Tibidabo (culminating point of the Collserola range), passing through Matadepera, Sant Quirze del Vallès, Bellaterra, and Sant Cugat del Vallès. Tributaries of the Llobregat include the Canyamssos, the Rubí and the Vallvidrera. East of that axis, the watershed of the Besòs includes the rivers Ripoll and Caldes, (the latter forming the eastern border of the comarca).

=== Major natural parks ===
- Parc Natural de Sant Llorenç de Munt i Serra de l'Obac
- Parc de Collserola

=== Hiking trails ===
Vallès Occidental has several notable official hiking trails, known as "senders de gran recorregut".

- GR-6: Barcelona – Montserrat (Classic route to Montserrat).
- GR-96: Barcelona – Montserrat (Roman road to Montserrat).
- GR-97: Abrera – Sant Celoni (From the Llobregat to the Tordera).
- GR-173: Circumnavigation of Vallès Occidental.

== Human and economic geography ==
Industry is concentrated in the south, coinciding with the flattest land in the comarca. The principal industrial cities are the co-capitals Sabadell and Terrassa, as well as Rubí and Cerdanyola del Vallès. The most important industries are textiles, mechanical engineering, metallurgy, machinery, electrical equipment, construction, chemicals, paper, and the processing of food products. An industrial crisis at the end of the 1970s and the beginning of the 1980s led to a greater importance for the commercial and service sectors, especially computer-related work.

The north remains primarily rural. Many of the residences there now function as second homes.

=== Municipalities ===
Municipality	Population (2025)	Area km^{2}
Badia del Vallès	13.058	0.9
Barberà del Vallès	34.031	8.3
Castellar del Vallès	25.395	44.9
Castellbisbal	13.058	31.0
Cerdanyola del Vallès	58.264	30.6
Gallifa	171	16.3
Matadepera	9.808	25.4
Montcada i Reixac	37.446	23.5
Palau-solità i Plegamans	15.584	14.9
Polinyà	8.572	8.8
Rellinars	928	17.8
Ripollet	39.773	4.3
Rubí	82.825	32.3
Sabadell	224.589	37.8
Sant Cugat del Vallès	97.959	48.2
Sant Llorenç Savall	2.591	41.1
Sant Quirze del Vallès	20.175	14.1
Santa Perpètua de Mogoda	26.101	15.8
Sentmenat	9.528	28.8
Terrassa	232.676	70.2
Ullastrell	2.170	7.3
Vacarisses	7.710	40.7
Viladecavalls	7.816	20.1
• Total: 23	970.228	583.1

=== Transportation ===
Much of Catalonia's transportation network passes through Vallès Occidental, with roads, railroads, etc. crossing the valley in various directions.

==== Motorways ====
- AP-7 crosses Vallès in an east-west direction. Heading west, it connects Vallès with Tarragona, València and the southern part of the Iberian Peninsula, similarly to the A-2/AP-2 (which connects Barcelona, Lleida, and Zaragoza). Heading east, it connects Vallès with the province of Girona and with France.
- C-58 crosses the comarca south to north, connecting Barcelona with Manresa by wy of Montcada i Reixac, Ripollet, Cerdanyola del Vallès, Sabadell, and Terrassa.
- Manresa, Terrassa, and Barcelona are also connected by C-16 or the Vallvidrera Tunnels, by way of Sant Cugat del Vallès and Rubí.
- C-33 connects Montcada i Reixac and Mollet del Vallès, connecting the northern part of Barcelona with autopista AP-7 to the northeast.

==== Highways ====
- N-150, the principal highway of the comarca, crosses south to north, connecting Barcelona to Terrassa by way of Montcada i Reixac, Ripollet, Cerdanyola del Vallès, Barberà del Vallès, and Sabadell. Beyond Terrassa, various carreteres comarcals complete the comarca's network:
- C-1413 starts at Molins de Rei, connects to the N-II and N-340 and the motorway A-2, and passes through Rubí, Sabadell, and Sentmenat before connecting finally to the N-152 at the heights of Centelles.
- C-1415 connects Vilafranca del Penedès (N-340), Sant Sadurní d'Anoia, and Martorell (A-7, N-II) to Granollers and Mataró (N-II, A-19) passing through Terrassa, Matadepera, Castellar del Vallès, and Sentmenat.
- C-155 connects Sabadell to Granollers, passing through Polinyà and Palau de Plegamans.

==== Railroads ====
Both railroad companies that operate in Catalonia have lines in Vallès Occidental. Renfe's Barcelona-Lleida line passes through Manresa. The Ferrocarrils de la Generalitat de Catalunya have the "Metro del Vallès", connecting Barcelona to Sabadell and Terrassa.

==== Airports ====
Most air traffic for Vallès Occidental comes through Prat airport in neighboring Baix Llobregat. Sabadell Airport is used for sport flying, as a base for firemen, and for air freight.

== Politics and government ==
=== Comarcal council ===
Councilors in the Comarcal Council of Vallès Occidental since 1987
Key to parties CUP ICV ICV–EUiA–EPM BComú–E (ENTESA) En Comú–ECG ECG–C ERC Independent TxT PSC JxCat Junts CiU Cs PP Vox
Election	Distribution	President
1987	11 / 14 / 13 / 1	Antoni Farrés i Sabater (PSUC)
1991	8 / 1 / 15 / 14 / 1	Oriol Civil (PSC)
1991	8 / 1 / 15 / 14 / 1	Carles Ferré (PSC)
1995	10 / 2 / 12 / 11 / 4	Carles Ferré (PSC)
1999	1 / 6 / 2 / 16 / 10 / 4	Carles Ferré (PSC) (1999-2001)
1999	1 / 6 / 2 / 16 / 10 / 4	Teresa Padrós (PSC) (2001-2003)
2003	5 / 5 / 17 / 8 / 4	Josep Vilaró (PSC)
2007	5 / 4 / 1 / 16 / 9 / 4	Antoni Rebolleda (PSC)
2011	5 / 3 / 1 / 13 / 11 / 6	Pepita Pedraza (PSC)
2015	5 / 6 / 7 / 9 / 6 / 4 / 2	Ignasi Giménez (PSC)
2019	2 / 3 / 10 / 2 / 12 / 5 / 4 / 1	Ignasi Giménez (PSC)
2023	2 / 3 / 7 / 2 / 14 / 5 / 3 / 3	Ignasi Giménez (PSC) (2023–2024)
2023	2 / 3 / 7 / 2 / 14 / 5 / 3 / 3	Xavier Garcés (PSC) (2024–)
