= Cerdanya =

Natural and historical region in Western Europe

Coordinates: 42°26′48″N 1°57′10″E

Cerdanya Cerdaña (Spanish) Cerdagne (French) La Cerdanya
- Natural region and Comarca
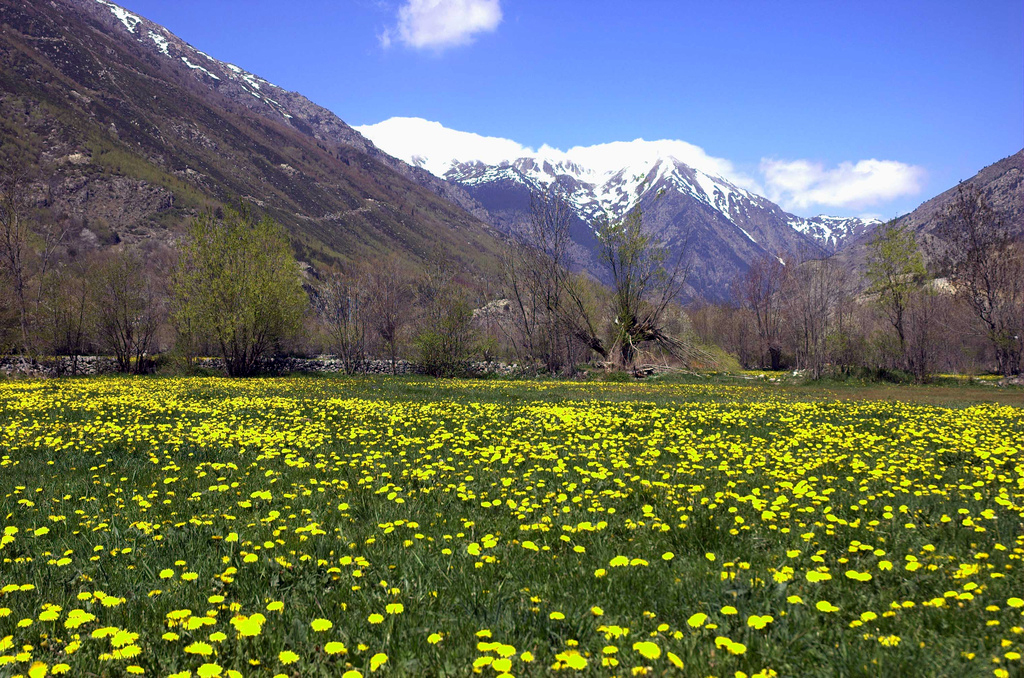
- Spring landscape of the Cerdanya in Llívia.

- Flag Traditional Coat of Arms

- Map showing Upper Cerdanya and Lower Cerdanya
- Country(s): France; Spain
- Subdivisions: Occitanie; Catalonia
- Provinces: Pyrénées-Orientales; Province of Girona; Province of Lleida
- Comarques: Cerdanya; Upper Cerdanya (no official status)

Area
  - Total: 1,086.07 km^{2} (419.33 sq mi)
- Elevation: 1,100 m (3,600 ft)

Population (2001)
  - Total: 26,500
  - Density: 24.4/km^{2} (63.2/sq mi)

Cerdanya (Catalan pronunciation: [səɾˈðaɲə]; Spanish: Cerdaña, Spanish: [θeɾˈðaɲa]; French: Cerdagne, pronounced [sɛʁdaɲ]; Occitan: Cerdanha) or often La Cerdanya is a natural comarca and historical region of the eastern Pyrenees divided between France and Spain. Historically it was one of the counties of Catalonia.

Cerdanya has a land area of 1,086.07 km^{2} (419 sq mi), divided almost evenly between Spain (50.3%) and France (49.7%). In 2001 its population was approximately 26,500, of whom 53% lived on Spanish territory. Its population density is 24 residents per km^{2} (63 per sq. mile). The only urban area in Cerdanya is the cross-border urban area of Puigcerdà-Bourg-Madame, which contained 10,900 inhabitants in 2001.

The area enjoys a high annual amount of sunshine – around 3,000 hours per year. For this reason, pioneering large-scale solar power projects have been built in several locations in French Cerdagne, including Font-Romeu-Odeillo-Via, the Themis plant near Targassonne, and Mont-Louis Solar Furnace in Mont-Louis.

== History ==
=== Antiquity ===
The first inhabitants of Cerdanya probably spoke a language related to the old Basque language and to Aquitanian. Many place names testify to this.

In the first millennium BC came the Iberians from the south. In Cerdanya they probably mixed with the native inhabitants, and the resulting people were known as the Kerretes, from the native word ker or kar, meaning rock, related to old Basque karri (modern Basque harri), stone.

The Kerretes were of Iberian, non-Indo-European origin, and Iberians occupied positions at the top of the Kerrete society.

The main oppidum of the Kerretes, commanding the whole country, was called Kere and was built on the hill above the modern-day village of Llívia (a Spanish exclave in French territory). Later the Kerretes came under Roman rule, and the Romans renamed the oppidum Julia Lybica, with a significant number of Roman citizens settling there. During the Roman Empire, the area of Cerdanya was a pagus known as pagus Liviensis (a name derived from its capital Julia Lybica), part of the province of Hispania Tarraconensis. The pagus Liviensis was itself divided in two: the eastern part around Julia Lybica was known as Cerretania Julia, while the western part was known as Cerretania Augusta. The name Cerdanya comes from Cerretania, itself coming from the old name of the inhabitants, the Kerretes. As for Julia Lybica, the name evolved into Julia Livia and then Llívia.

The Kerretes seem to have kept their old language until very late, probably as late as the 8th or 9th century. Romanization in the area was extremely slow, even though eventually the native language gave way, and the people in Cerdanya ended up speaking Catalan, a language derived from Latin. At the end of the Roman Empire, Julia Lybica entered a period of decadence, and lost much of its importance. It is around this time that the town of La Seu d'Urgell (in Catalonia, but outside of Cerdanya) started to replace Julia Lybica as the main center of population in that area of northern Catalonia, and in the 6th century when the diocese (bishopric) of Urgell was founded, Cerdanya was inside its limits.

=== Middle Ages ===
Devastated by the Vandals and other Germanic tribes, Cerdanya was part of the Visigothic kingdom of Toulouse and later Toledo, until eventually it was conquered by the Muslims. After Muslim expansion was halted by Odo the Great in the Battle of Toulouse (721), the Berber commander Uthman ibn Naissa established a small realm in Cerdanya and allied with Odo, so that the Aquitanian leader could secure his south-eastern borders. However, Uthman ibn Naissa came next under Umayyad attack and the Berber lord was defeated, opening the way to Abdul Rahman Al Ghafiqi's expedition into Aquitaine. During Abd al-Rahman I's military campaign across the Ebro region (781), the Cordovan commander received the submission of Ibn Belaskut, or Galindo Belascotenes, in Cerdanya. Under Carolingian pressure, Cerdanya became a Frankish vassal about 785.

County of Cerdanya

The county of Cerdanya has its origin in the Spanish Marches established by Charlemagne. In the 9th century, Cerdanya was one of the lordships united in the person of the counts of Barcelona, who were also counts of Girona, Narbonne, and Urgell. Wilfred the Hairy (count 870–897) had three sons and established the youngest, Miron (died 927), as Count of Cerdanya, a sovereign state.

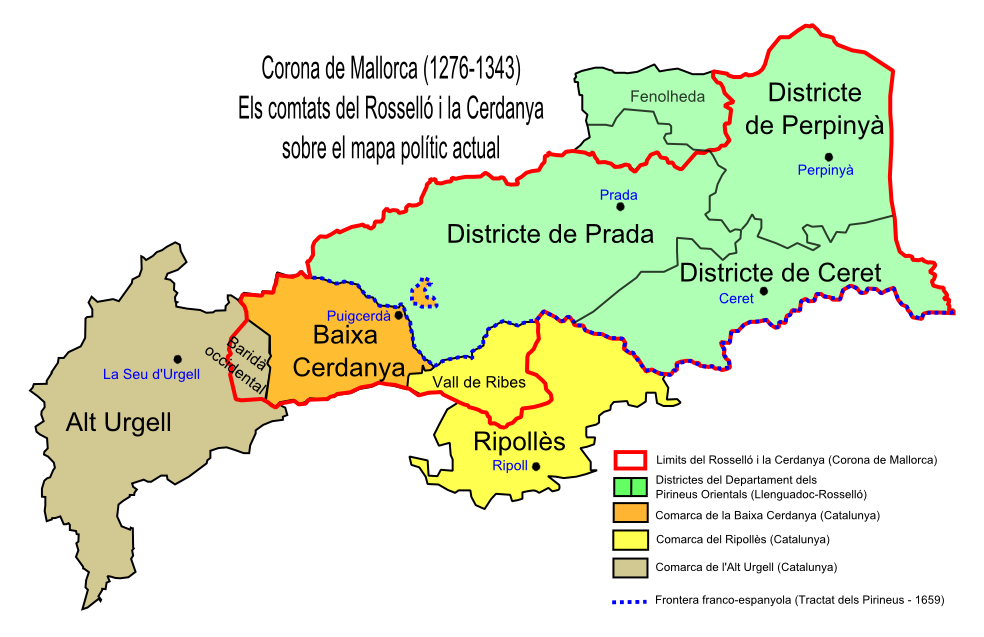
The ancient counties of Rosselló and Cerdanya on a present-day political map

The sovereign county of Cerdanya bordered the county of Urgell, the county of Barcelona, the county of Besalú, the county of Roussillon, and the county of Razès. The county of Cerdanya was made up of Cerdanya proper with the addition of other areas which it managed to acquire over time through inheritance, such as Capcir and Conflent. Thus, the county of Cerdanya was actually quite an important county. The counts of Cerdanya were great patrons of abbeys, most famously Saint-Michel de Cuxa (Catalan: Sant Miquel de Cuixà), dating back to the 10th century and located in Conflent, and Saint-Martin-du-Canigou (Catalan: Sant Martí del Canigó), dedicated by Count Guifred of Cerdanya in 1009.

However, the line of the counts died out in 1117 and the county was inherited by the counts of Barcelona, later to become kings of Aragon.

=== Modern times ===
The modern natural comarca of Cerdanya in Catalonia and Pyrénées-Orientales.

The coat of arms of the comarca of Lower Cerdanya in Catalonia, which is also donned on its administrative Comarcal Council emblem.

Cerdanya proper was split between Spain and France by the Treaty of the Pyrenees of 1659, with the north of Cerdanya becoming French, while the south of Cerdanya remained Spanish. The counties of Rosselló, Capcir, and Conflent also became French at that time.

Today, the Spanish side of Cerdanya is a Catalan comarca known as Baixa Cerdanya (i.e. "Lower Cerdanya"), and whose capital is Puigcerdà. Puigcerdà was already the capital of Cerdanya before the division of 1659, having replaced Hix in 1178 as capital of Cerdanya. Hix, the place where the counts of Cerdanya resided, is now a village inside the commune of Bourg-Madame on the French side of the border. Hix had itself replaced Llívia, which was the ancient capital of Cerdanya in Antiquity. At the Treaty of the Pyrenees it was decided that Llívia would remain Spanish (allegedly because the treaty stipulated that only villages were to be ceded to France, and Llívia was considered a city and not a village, due to its status as the ancient capital of Cerdanya), so Llívia is now an enclave of Spain inside French territory.

The French side of Cerdanya is part of the département of Pyrénées-Orientales and has no particular status. People in France refer to it as Cerdagne française (that is, "French Cerdanya"), or just Cerdagne, while people on the Spanish side refer to it as Alta Cerdanya ("Upper Cerdanya"). Its main towns are Bourg-Madame and the ski resort of Font-Romeu.

Despite the split between France and Spain, ties remain between families on both sides of the border, with frequent travel from one country to the other. During World War I, Cerdanya has been the place of an important smuggling trade in which horses and mules went from French to Spanish Cerdanya, before being sold to the French army and going back to France through Le Perthus.

== Municipalities ==
=== French side ===
Known as French Cerdagne (Catalan: Alta Cerdanya), it is part of the French department of Pyrénées-Orientales, which itself is part of the Occitanie region. It has no special administrative self-government status apart from that of the department, thus solely being a physiographic region within the department.

- Angoustrine-Villeneuve-des-Escaldes (Catalan: Angostrina)
- Bolquère (Catalan: Bolquera)
- Bourg-Madame (Catalan: La Guingueta d’Ix)
- Dorres
- Égat (Catalan Èguet)
- Enveitg (Catalan Enveig)
- Err (Catalan Er)
- Estavar
- Eyne (Catalan Eina)
- Font-Romeu-Odeillo-Via (Catalan Font-Romeu or Odelló i Vià)
- La Cabanasse (Catalan La Cabanassa)
- Latour-de-Carol (Catalan La Tor de Querol)
- Llo
- Mont-Louis (Catalan Montlluís)
- Nahuja (Catalan Naüja)
- Osséja (Catalan Osseja)
- Palau-de-Cerdagne (Catalan Palau de Cerdanya)
- Planès (Catalan Planès)
- Porta
- Porté-Puymorens (Catalan Portè)
- Saillagouse (Catalan Sallagosa)
- Saint-Pierre-dels-Forcats (Catalan Sant Pere dels Forcats)
- Sainte-Léocadie (Catalan Santa Llocaia)
- Targassonne (Catalan Targasona)
- Ur
- Valcebollère (Catalan: Vallsabollera)

=== Spanish side ===
Known as Baixa Cerdanya. Unlike its French counterpart, it does constitute its own administrative division inside the autonomous community of Catalonia as a comarca or county, with its own self-ruling institutions known as the Comarcal Council of Cerdanya, inside the already self-ruling autonomous Catalonia. All municipalities of Baixa Cerdanya are part of the Catalan region of Alt Pirineu, this one itself divided between the Spanish provinces of Lleida and Girona.

Municipality	Population (2014)	Area km^{2}
Alp	1,661	44.3
Bellver de Cerdanya	2,075	98.2
Bolvir	373	10.3
Das	220	14.6
Fontanals de Cerdanya	443	28.6
Ger	432	33.4
Guils de Cerdanya	536	22.0
Isòvol	301	10.8
Lles de Cerdanya	260	102.8
Llívia	1,536	12.9
Meranges	94	37.3
Montellà i Martinet	623	55.0
Prats i Sansor	248	6.6
Prullans	209	21.2
Puigcerdà	8,761	18.9
Riu de Cerdanya	106	12.3
Urús	185	17.4
Total (17)	18,063	546.6

== Economy ==
Like neighboring areas of the Pyrenees, Cerdanya relies on tourism to provide strong support for the economy. Spas, skiing, and hiking are long-established attractions. In addition the Yellow Train is a major tourist attraction.

La Cerdanya is best known amongst Barcelona locals and tourists for its skiing. "Masella" ski resort, located close to Urus and Alp, opened on January 3 and, due to the mountain's orientation to the North, offers one the longest skiing season in the Pyrenees. The ski station today boasts of 62 slopes with 15 ski lifts, and since 2013, has nocturnal skiing. Physically adjacent to Masella, though requiring a different ski pass, is "La Molina" with 68 ski slopes. Due to La Cerdanya's close proximity to Andorra and France, its residents also enjoy skiing in "Font Romeu," "Formigueres," "Les Angles," and "Grandvalira."

== Notable people ==
- Dr. José Baselga, oncologist
