= Serra de Moixeró =

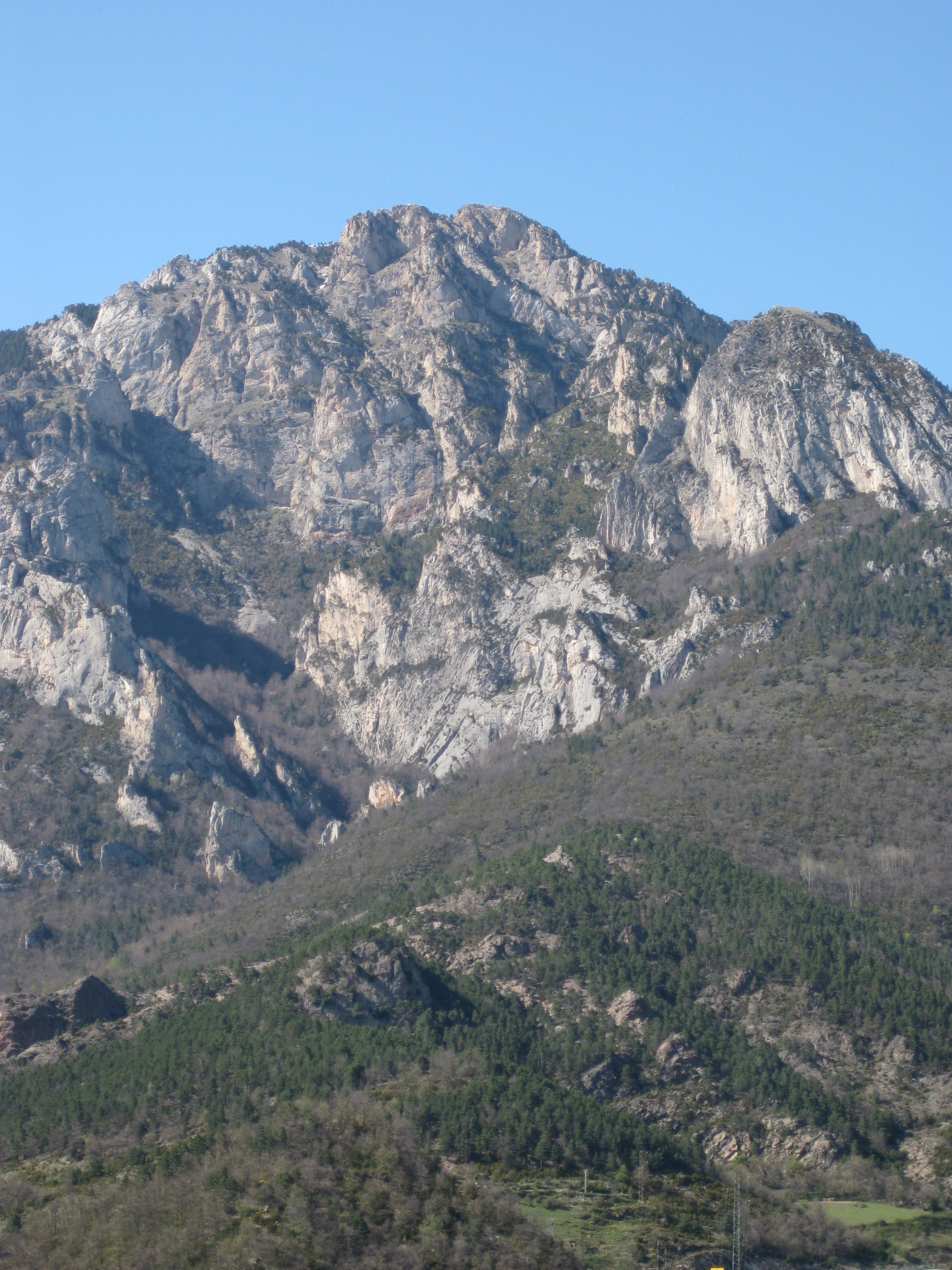
- Penyes Altes de Moixeró mountain

Highest point
- Peak: Penyes Altes de Moixeró
- Elevation: 2,276 m (7,467 ft)
- Coordinates: 42°18′05.62″N 1°51′23.18″E

Geography
- Location within Pyrenees
- Country: Spain
- Province: Barcelona, Catalonia
- Parent range: Pre-Pyrenees, central/eastern zone

Geology
- Orogeny: Alpine orogeny
- Rock age: Jurassic
- Rock type: Limestone

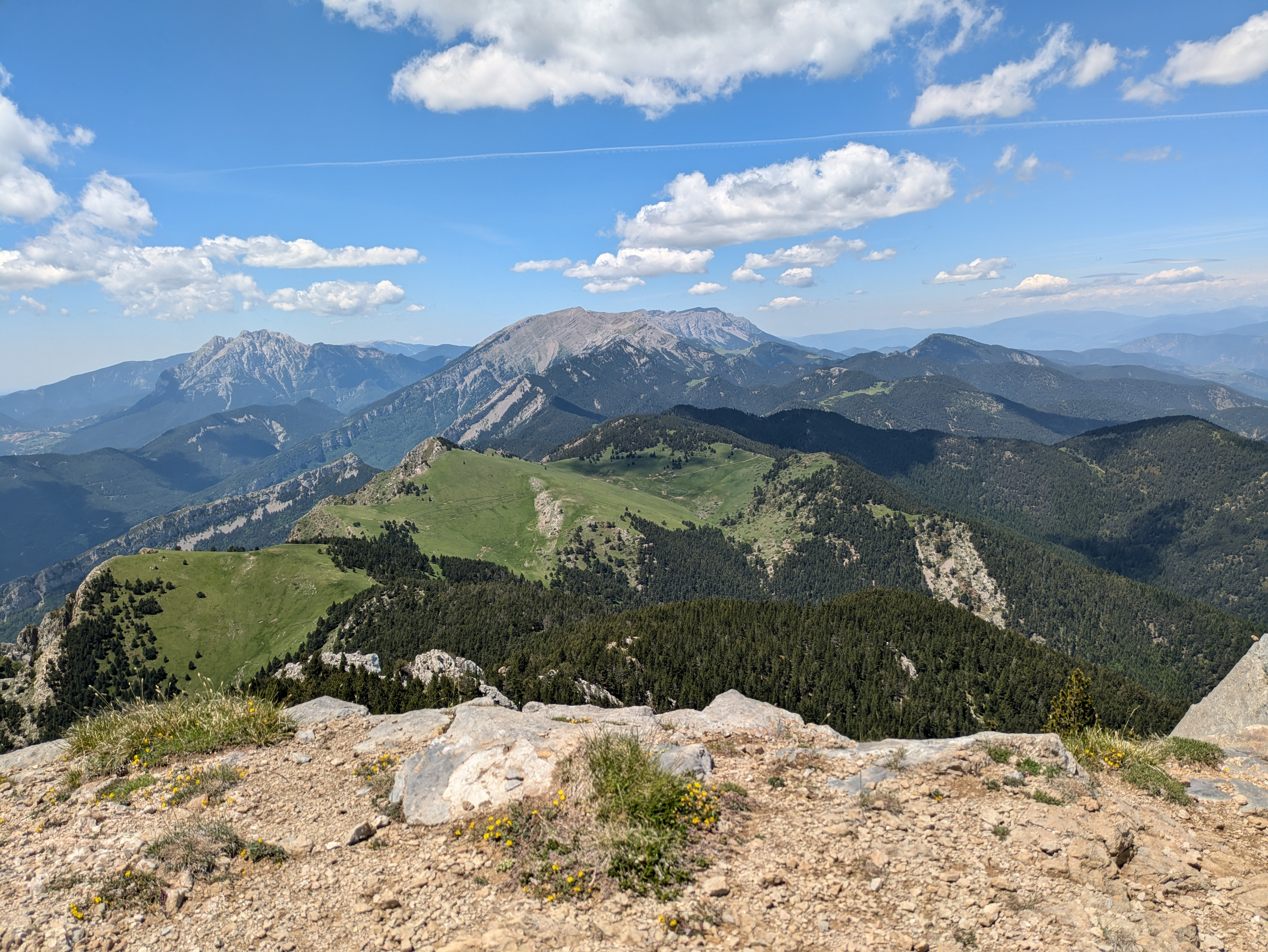
Serra de Moixeró, seen from Penyes Altes de Moixeró. In the distance (centre): Comabona.

The Serra de Moixeró is a mountain range running across the north of Catalonia (Spain), part of the Pre-Pyrenees. Along with the adjacent Serra del Cadí, Pedraforca and parts of Tosa d'Alp and Puigllançada, it forms part of the Cadí-Moixeró Natural Park, established in 1983.

The Serra de Moixeró is often confused as a part of the Serra del Cadí, despite the fact that these two ranges are separated by the Tancalaporta pass. The confusion is widespread enough that Cadí Tunnel, which connects Cerdanya with the rest of Catalonia beneath the Serra de Moixeró, was erroneously named for the adjacent range.

== Geography ==
Since Moixeró is considered older than the Cadí range (it formed during the Variscan orogeny of the Paleozoic era), it is considered the start of the "axial" Pyrenees, beginning at the Pass of Pendís (1,760 m). From there, it continues to Tosa d'Alp and Puigllançada, to beyond the Pas of Toses. Along with the adjacent ranges, it divides the watersheds of the Llobregat and Segre rivers.

The range's most significant peaks are the Turó de Pratagre (2,012 m), Moixeró (2,078 m), the plateau of Moixeró (2,063 m), the Penyes Altes de Moixeró (2,276 m), the Serrat de la Miquela (2,161 m), Soquetes (2,181 m), and the pass of Jou (2,000 m), near the foothills of Tosa d'Alp. The northern slopes of the ridge descend gradually to the plain of Cerdanya, with numerous streams descending the slopes.

The southern slopes of the Serra de Moixeró are located in Berguedà, and are drained by the Gréixer stream, a tributary of the Bastareny. This river cuts perpendicularly to the range, which has created a series of descending plateaus parallel to the east–west direction of the ridge. Uniquely, around the Gréixer, the principal stone is variegated effusive rhyolite; in most of the rest of the range, Devonian limestone are found at peaks while carboniferous schist is more plentiful at lower elevations and to the east.

== Climate and vegetation ==
At lower elevations, the most common flora on Moixeró includes red pine and fir, with small scattered stands of beech. After 1,800 metres black pine becomes more common, and after 2,000 metres, the ridges are mostly covered with mountain meadows or simply whitish rocks, depending on the local climate.
