= Guils Fontanera =

Ski resort

- Interactive map of Guils Fontanera
- Nearest city: Guils de Cerdanya, Catalonia
- Coordinates: 42°27′36″N 1°50′24″E
- Top elevation: 2,080
- Base elevation: 1,905
- Trails: Nordic skiing Black circuit: 1 km Red circuit : 14 km Blue circuit: 7 km Green circuit: 7 km Racquets circuit: 12 km Skating circuit:8 km
- Website: www.guils.com

Guils Fontanera is a Catalan ski resort in the northern area of the municipality of Guils de Cerdanya, for Nordic skiing. Surrounded by a large forest of black pine, is situated on the northern side of Puigcerdà. It borders the municipalities of La Tor de Querol, Porta and Ger.

The resort opened in 1992. Altogether has 29 km of cross-country ski runs located between elevations of 1,905 and 2,080 m. They are divided according to difficulty:

- Green circuit: 7 km
- Blue circuit: 7 km
- Red circuit: 14 km
- Black circuit: 1 km
- Skating circuit: 8 km
- Snowshoeing circuit: 12 km

At the highest point, the circuit ends in the municipal boundary of Ger, but doing ski mountaineering is possible to reach the Mountain hut of la Feixa and the Malniu lake.
