= Cereja =

- Village
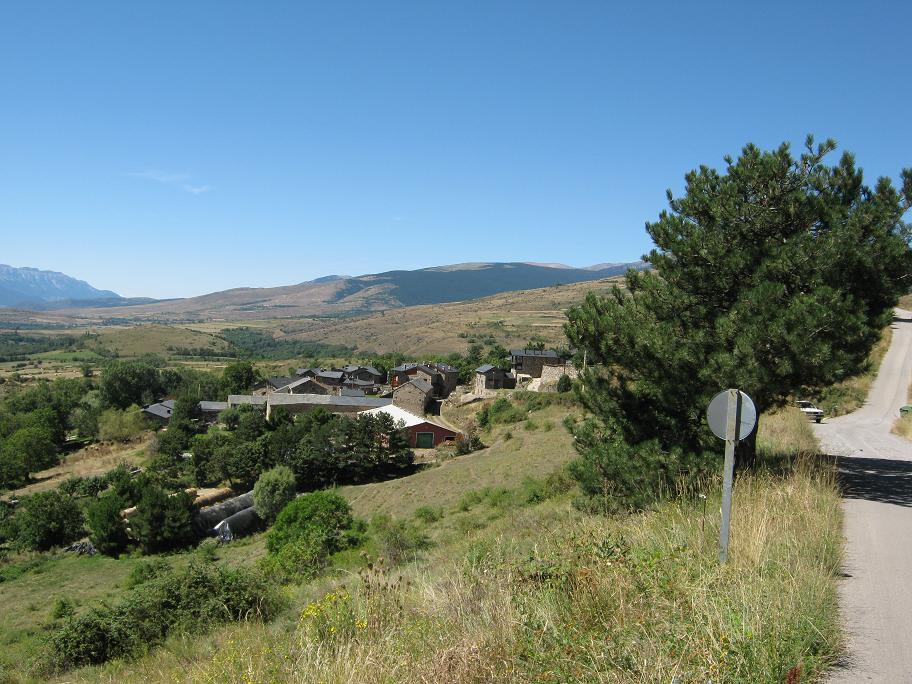

- Location in Catalonia
- Coordinates: 42°27′52″N 1°58′51″E
- Country: Spain
- Autonomous community: Catalonia
- Province: Girona
- Comarca: Cerdanya
- Judicial district: Puigcerdà
- Elevation: 1,354 m (4,442 ft)

Population (2014)
  - Total: 24
- Demonym(s): cerejà, cerejana
- Time zone: UTC+1 (CET)
  - Summer (DST): UTC+2 (CEST)

Cereja (Catalan pronunciation: [səˈɾɛʒə]) is a village in the exclave of Llívia in the comarca of Cerdanya, province of Girona, Catalonia, Spain. The small village is placed at the bottom of Puig del Tudó, near the ditch of Angostrina, to the northwest of the Llívia nucleus.
