= Church of Santa Maria, All =

Catholic parish church in Catalonia

- Santa Maria d'All
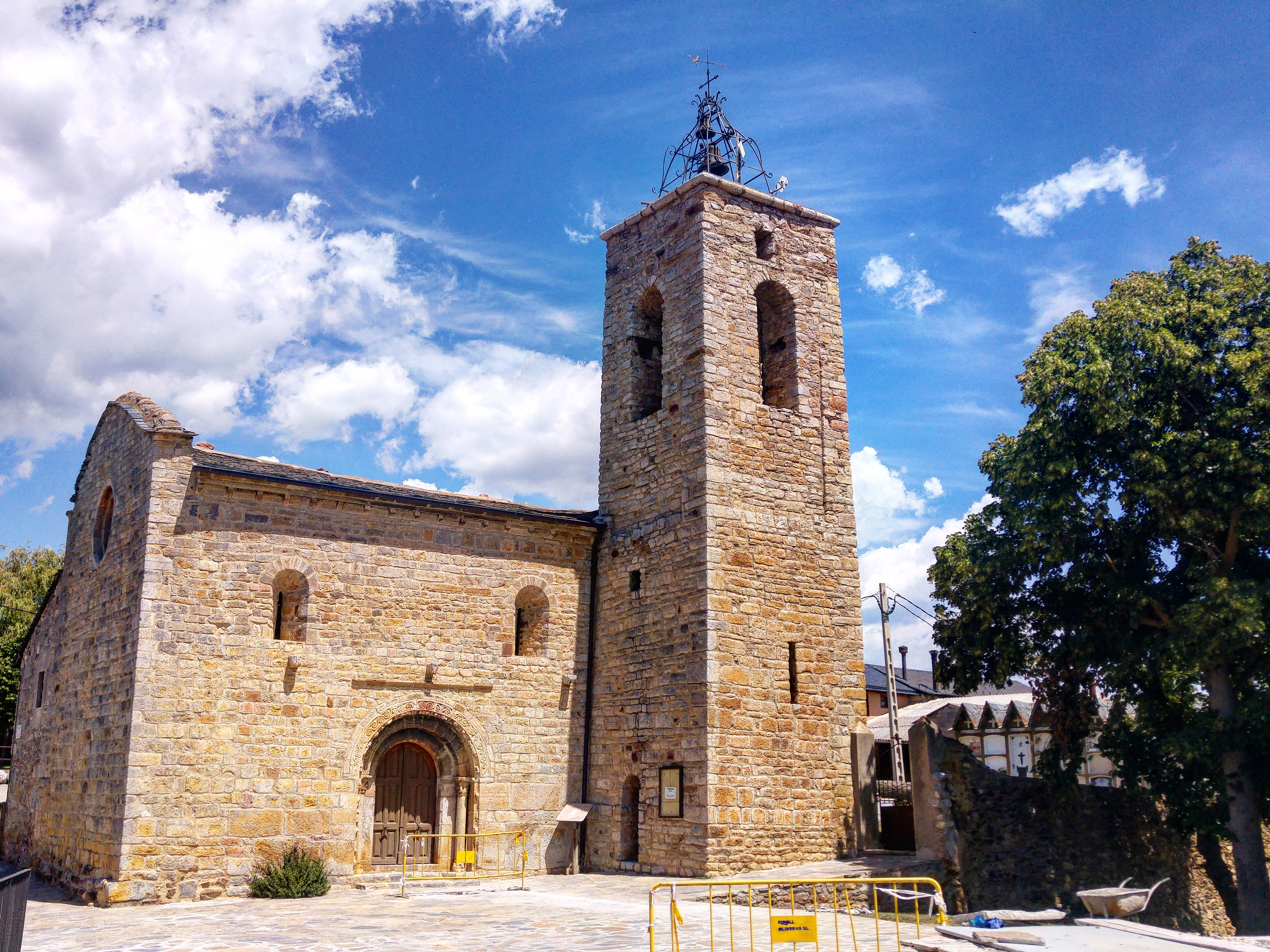

Religion
- Affiliation: Catholic Church

Location
- Country: Spain

Architecture
- Style: Romanesque
- Completed: bef. 839

The Church of Santa Maria (Catalan: Santa Maria d'All, French: Église Sainte-Marie d'All) is a Catholic church located in All, a village in the Spanish municipality of Isòvol in Cerdanya, a comarca in northern Catalonia.

== History ==
Santa Maria is first mentioned in the Act of Consecration of the Cathedral of Urgell in 839. The church belongs to the parish of All. Two polychrome Romanesque images from the church, which are known as "the Majesty" and "the Virgin of All" and date from the end of the twelfth or early thirteenth century, are preserved in the National Art Museum of Catalonia.

== Architecture ==
The church, built of ashlar with a very irregular masonry (opus incertum), consists of a single nave, side chapels on the north of the building, a semicircular apse and a square bell tower located to the south of the building.

The southern side is adorned with a door which is considered to be among the most beautiful in Cerdanya, alongside those of Guils de Cerdanya, Llo, Saga, Olopte and Vià.

The door is framed by a pair of columns with carved capitals portraying orans, or praying figures. It is topped by an archivolt with three arches. Two of these arches are decorated with geometric patterns. The outer arch has a bevel decorated with representations of figures.

The southern side also has two corbels: one, which is the head of an animal, is located above the door, and the other one, a human face, is under one of the windows.
