= Núria Cadenes =

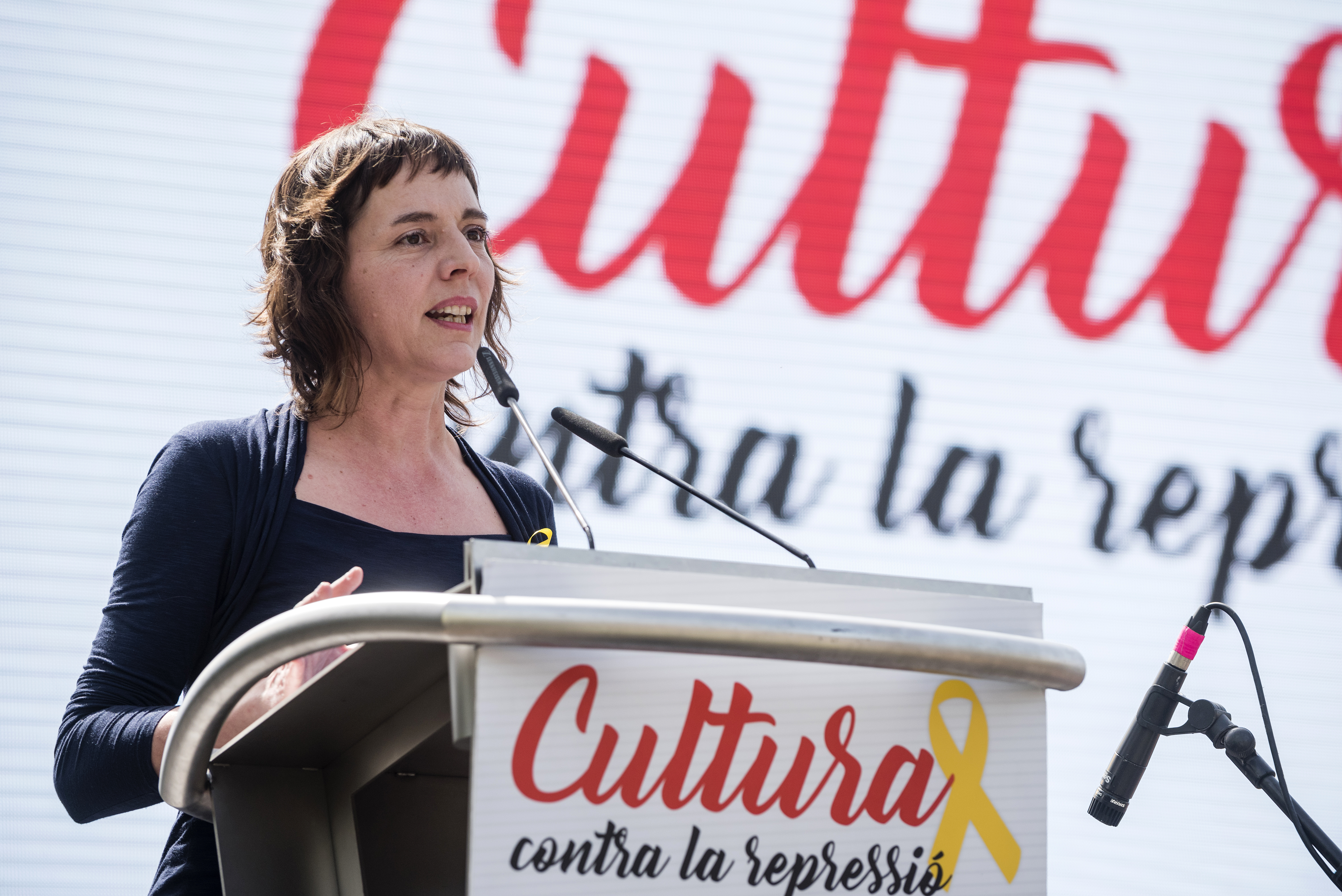
- Núria Cadenes
- Born: Núria Cadenes i Alabèrnia; 1970 (age 55–56); Barcelona
- Occupations: Writer and activist
- Notable work: Guillem

Núria Cadenes i Alabèrnia (Barcelona, 18 February 1970) is a Catalan journalist, writer and pro-independence activist.

== Biography ==
Born on 18 February 1970 in the Turó de la Peira neighbourhood, Núria Cadenes is the daughter of Teresa Alabèrnia i Domènech and Josep Maria Cadenes. Her mother's family is from Meranges, Ger and Palamós. During her youth she studied at the Heura School, which was secular and Catalanist. Later, she participated in the Catalan student movement of the late 1980s and was the founder of the pro-independence youth organisation Maulets.

On the morning of 9 September 1988, when she was 18 years old, she was arrested in Barcelona near the Barcelona Officers' Residence in the company of three other people for her alleged participation in a foiled attack on Terra Lliure. In October 1990, she was tried by the National Court, along with Jordi Petit i Ferrer, Jaume Palou i Guijarro and Guillem Godó i Blasco, for her alleged participation in the Terra Lliure attack attempt against the Spanish Army officers' residence in Barcelona on 9 September 1988, which was foiled by the police. All of them denied before the court that they belonged to the armed organization and had participated in the aforementioned action, as well as the illegal possession of weapons with the aggravating circumstance of having erased their serial numbers.

After the appeal, the Supreme Court in its ruling of January 30, 1992 decided to acquit her of the charge of belonging to an armed gang due to lack of evidence, but upheld the rest of the charges. Although she was arrested without carrying weapons or explosives, the court considered conclusive the statements of the other defendants that linked her to her participation in the attempted placement of an explosive device, with illicit possession of weapons, at the officers' residence in Barcelona on September 9. She was sentenced to six years in prison and two in juvenile prison.

In October 1992 she was released after serving four years in various Spanish prisons. After being released she returned to Barcelona, where she studied history at the University of Barcelona and worked as a translator. Later, she moved to the city of Valencia, where she worked for the magazine El Temps and Acció Cultural del País Valencià.

In 2006, Palou and Godó exonerated Cadenes of having participated in the attack, claiming that she did not belong to Terra Lliure and that she had never participated in any of its actions.

She was a founding member of the youth organization Maulets and a militant of the Socialist Party of National Liberation (PSAN). In the 1992 elections to the Parliament of Catalonia, she ran second on the list for the Barcelona demarcation for Catalunya Lliure, which did not obtain representation.

In the 2010 elections to the Parliament of Catalonia, she closed the candidacy for the Girona demarcation of the electoral coalition Solidaritat Catalana per la Independència (SI) representing PSAN. On the other hand, at the first National Congress of SI, held on February 23, 2011 in Manresa, she was elected national secretary for Training and Support for Members of the pro-independence party, and at the second, held in Vic on January 26, 2013, she was elected president.

== Awards ==
- 2010 – Premi de la Crítica dels Escriptors Valencians, for AZ
- 2016 – Premi Crims de Tinta, for Tota la veritat
- 2021 – Premi Lletra d'Or, for Guillem
- 2020 – València Negra, for Guillem
- 2025 – Premi Proa de Novel·la, for Qui salva una vida

== Literary works ==
- Cartes de la presó. València: Eliseu Climent, 1990. ISBN 978-84-7502-275-8
- El cel de les oques. Barcelona: Columna, 1999. ISBN 978-84-8300-712-9
- Memòries de presó (1988–1992). València: Eliseu Climent, 1994. ISBN 978-84-7502-423-3
- L'Ovidi. València: Eliseu Climent, 2002. ISBN 978-84-7502-649-7 (on Ovidi Montllor)
- Vine al sud! Guia lúdica del País Valencià. Barcelona: Columna, 2008. ISBN 978-84-664-0934-6
- AZ. València: Eliseu Climent, 2009 ISBN 978-84-750-2829-3 (26 short stories)
- El banquer. Barcelona: Edicions de 1984, 2013. ISBN 978-84-15835-07-3
- Tota la veritat. Barcelona: La Magrana, 2016. ISBN 9788482648019.
- Secundaris. Comanegra, 2018) ISBN 9788417188535
- Guillem. Barcelona: Amsterdam, 2020. ISBN 9788417918194 (on Guillem Agulló)
- Temps obert. Barcelona: Comanegra. 2022. ISBN 978-84-18857-77-5.
- Tiberi Cèsar. Barcelona: Proa. 2023. ISBN 9788419657336.
- En carn i ossos. Barcelona: Ara Llibres. 2025. ISBN 9788411731416.
- Qui salva una vida. Barcelona: Proa, 2025. ISBN 9788410488601
