= Penyes Altes de Moixeró =

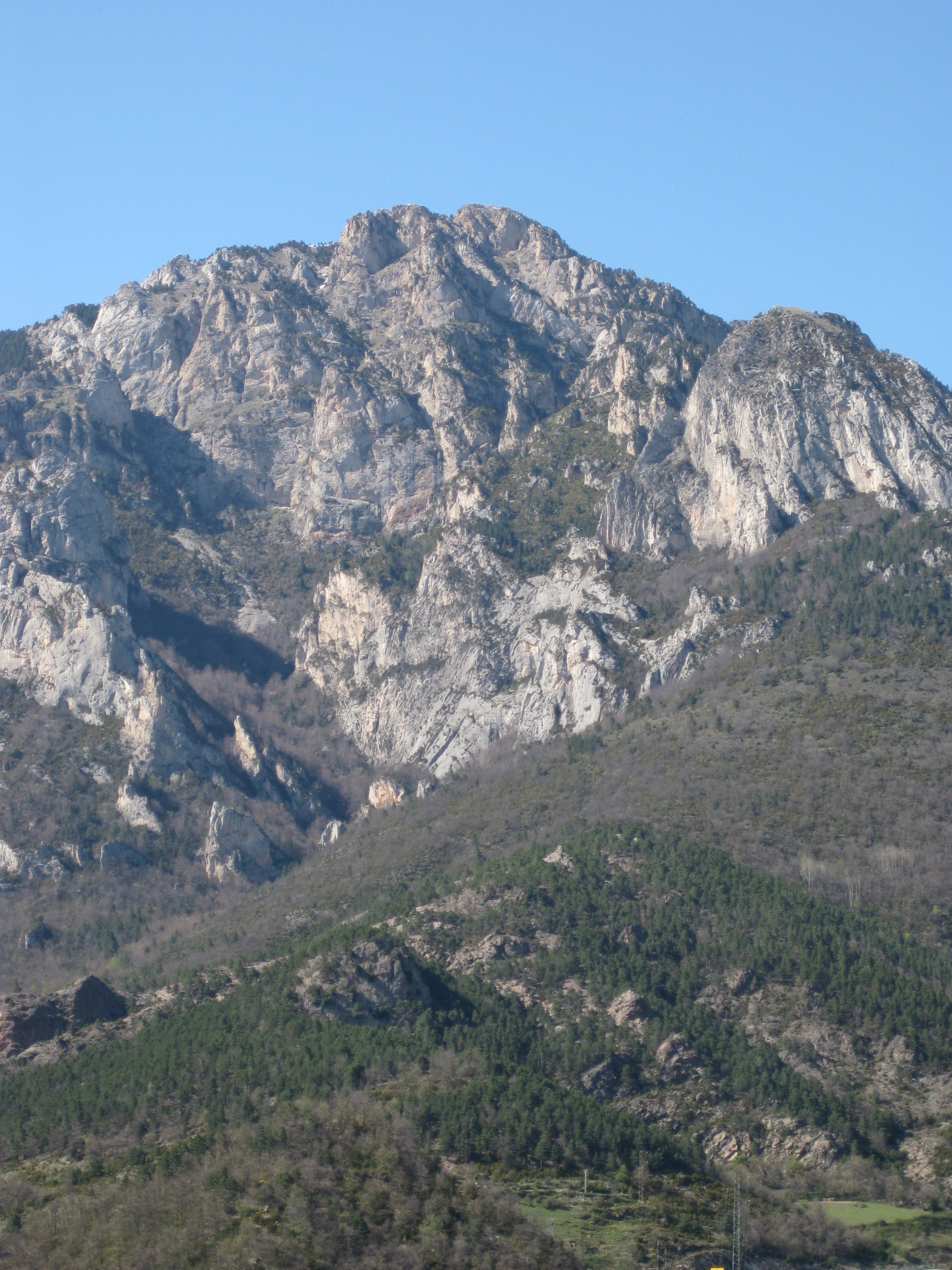

Highest point
- Elevation: 2,276 m (7,467 ft)
- Coordinates: 42°18′23″N 01°50′33″E

Geography
- Location within Spain
- Location: Catalonia, Spain
- Parent range: Serra de Moixeró

Penyes Altes de Moixeró is a mountain of Catalonia, Spain. It has an elevation of 2,276 metres (7,467 ft) above sea level.

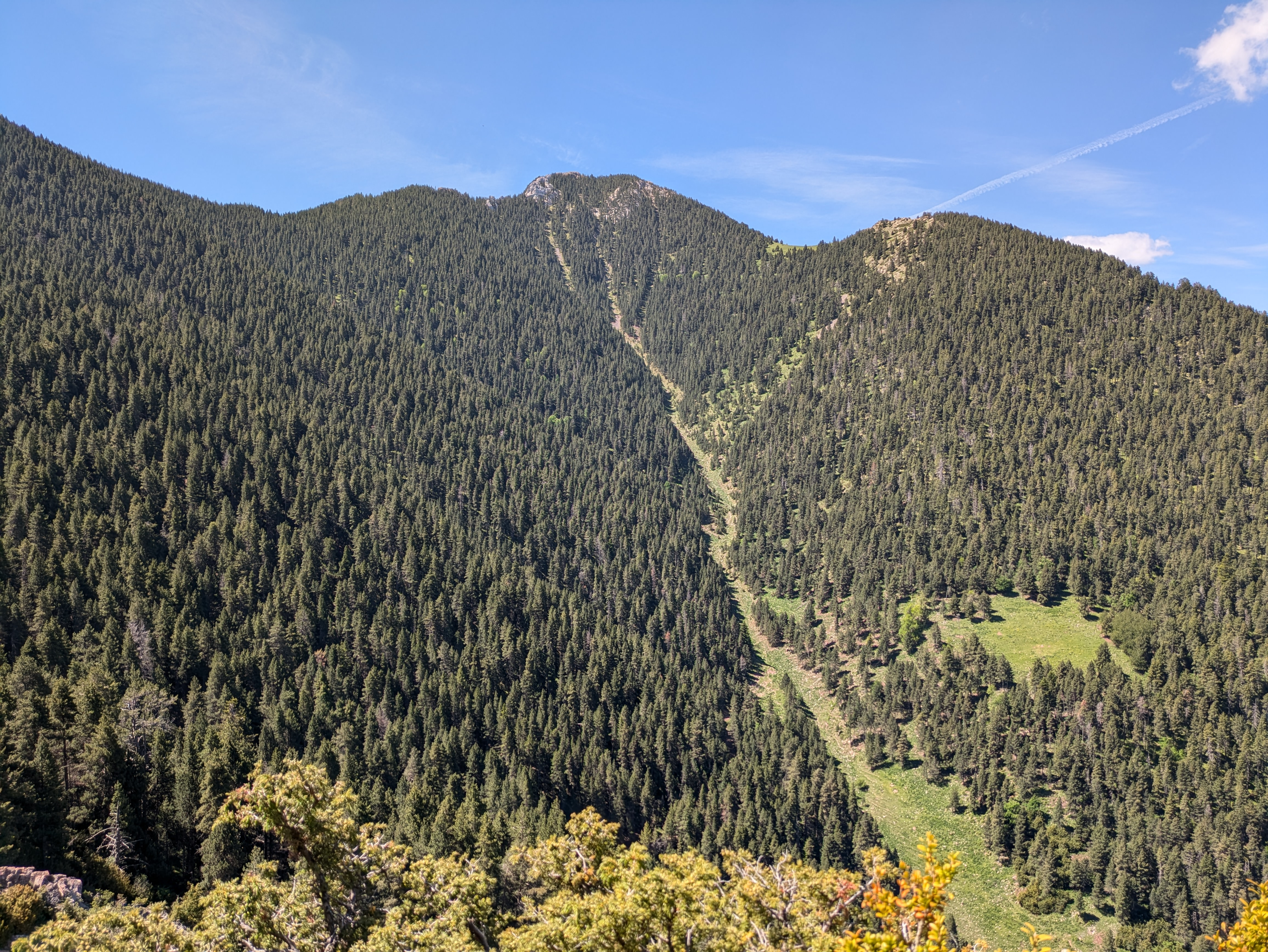
Penyes Altes de Moixeró, north side.

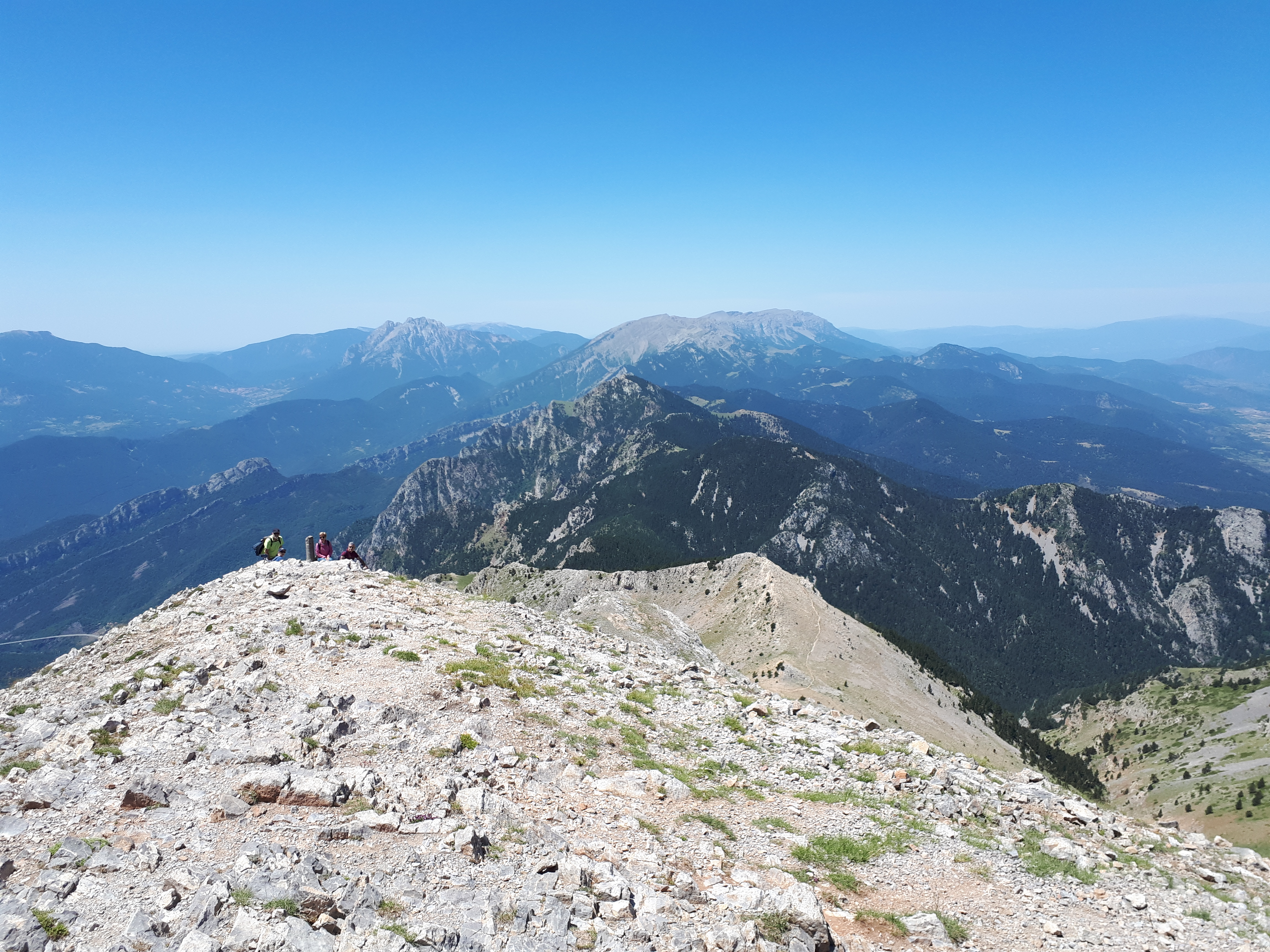
Penyes Altes de Moixeró from la Tosa d'Alp.

== See also ==
- Mountains of Catalonia
