= Tosa d'Alp =

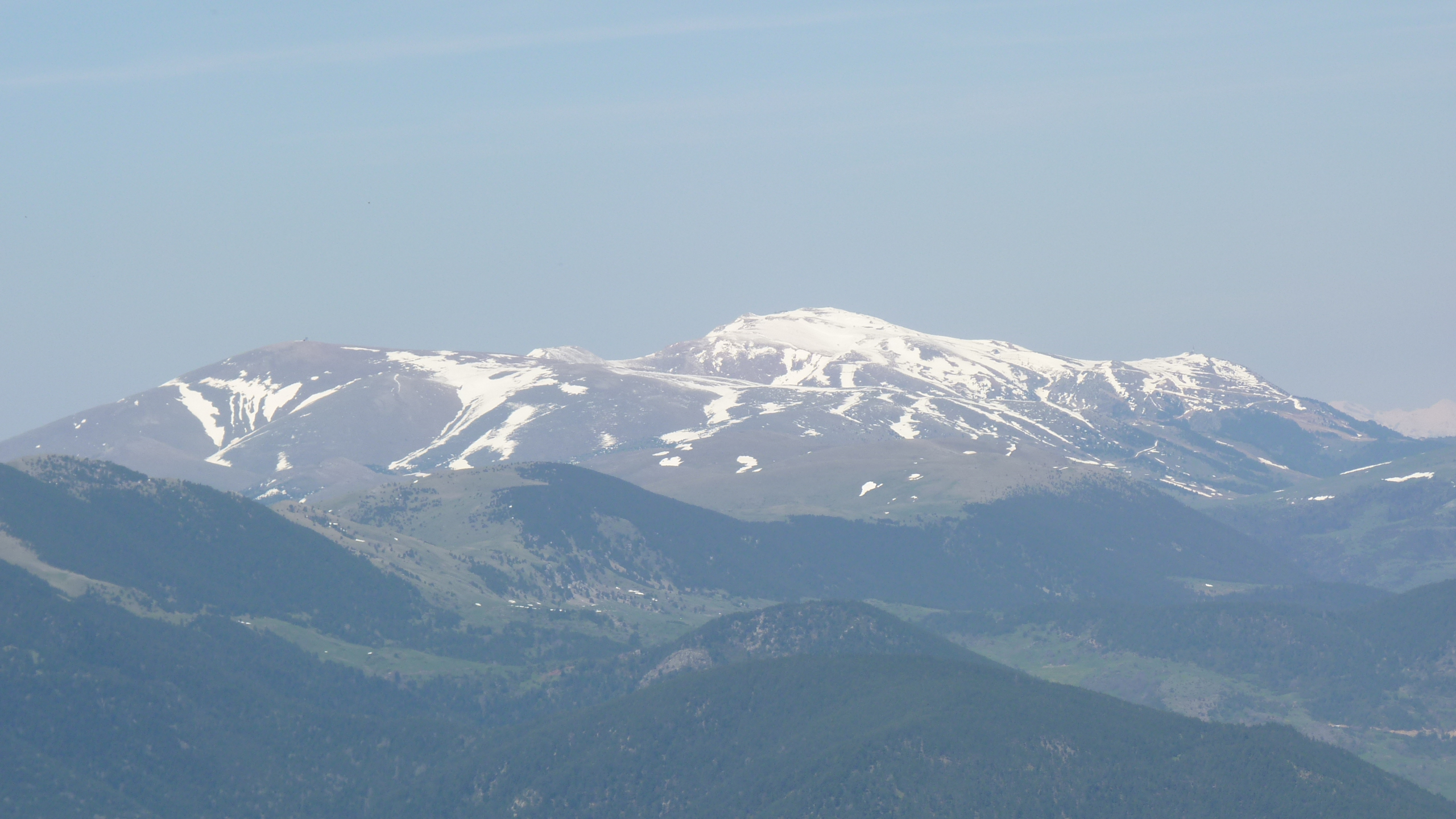

Highest point
- Elevation: 2,537 m (8,323 ft)
- Listing: List of mountains in Catalonia
- Coordinates: 42°19′18.02″N 1°53′37.75″E

Naming
- Language of name: Catalan

Geography
- Location: Baixa Cerdanya
- Parent range: Pyrenees

Climbing
- Easiest route: Climb

Tosa d'Alp or La Tosa is a 2,537-metre-high (8,323 ft) mountain in Baixa Cerdanya in the Spanish Pyrenees. The Coll de Pal is a mountain pass that separates its eastern part from the Puigllançada. This mountain forms a quadripoint where the Alp, Urús, Das and Bagà municipal limits meet. There is a triangulation station (282081001) at the summit.

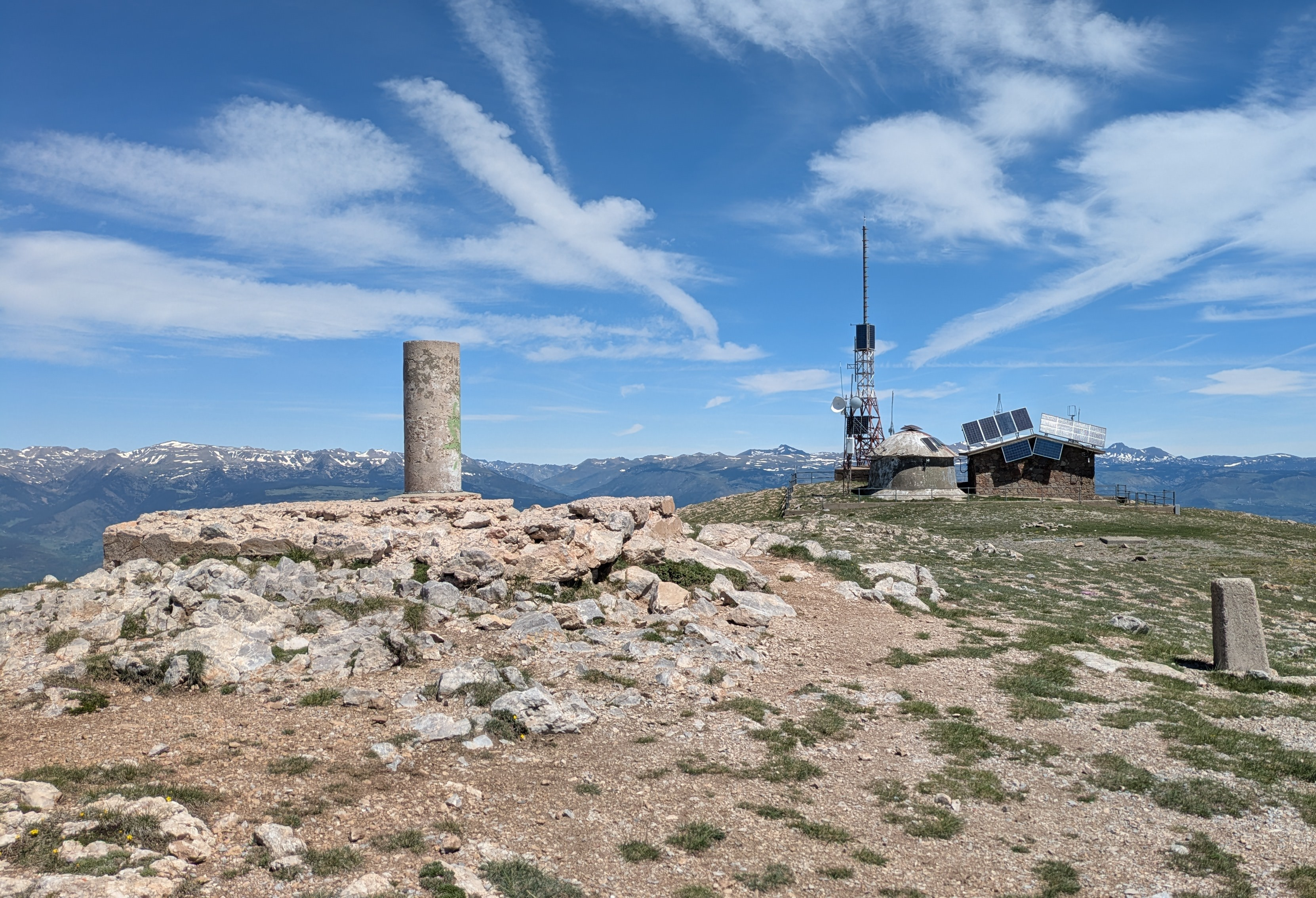
The summit.

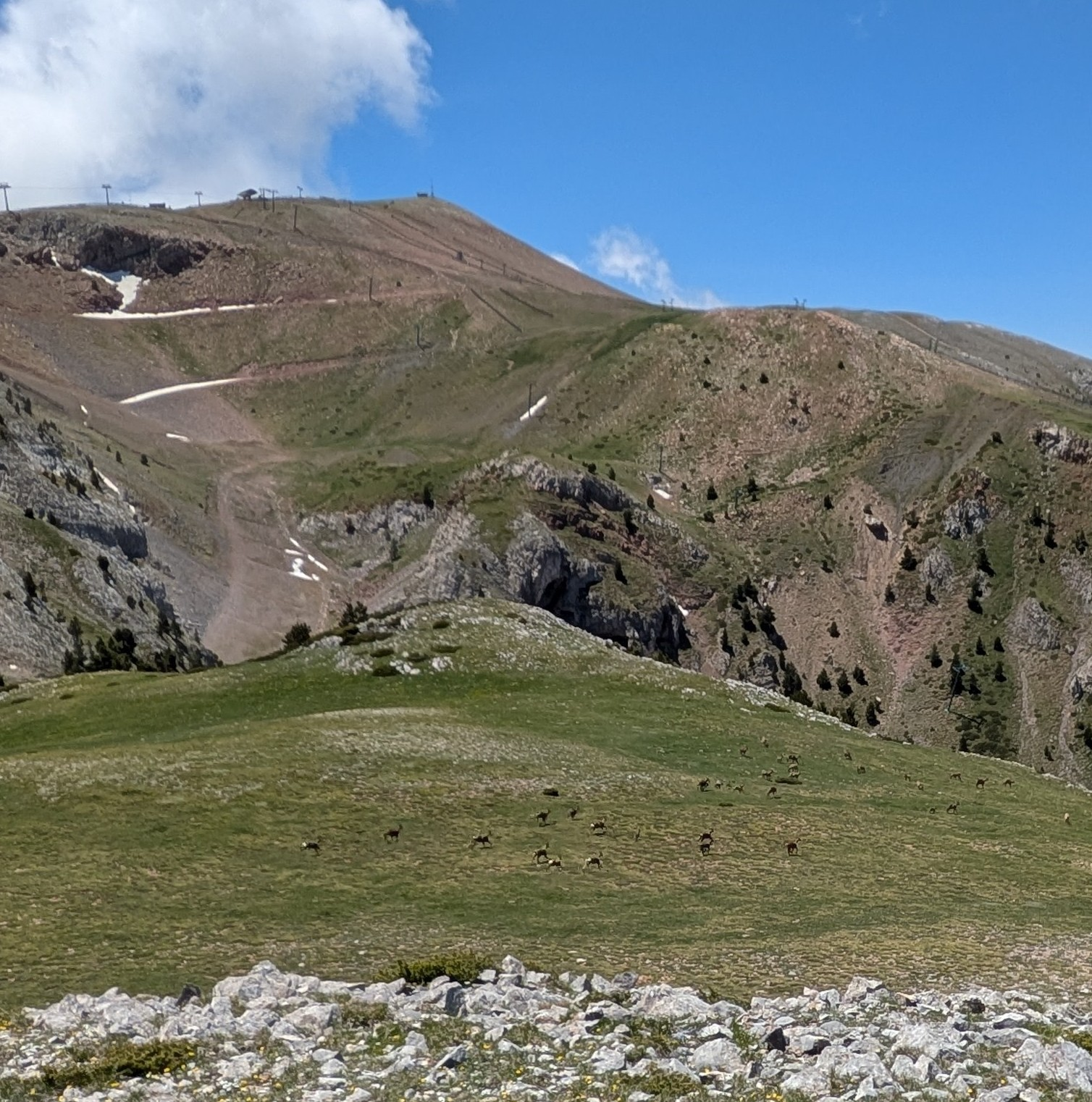
Pyrenean chamois (isards) on the mountain, at an altitude of 2300 metres.

Part of its slopes are home to the ski resort of Masella which is part of Alp 2500.
