= Prats i Sansor =

- Municipality
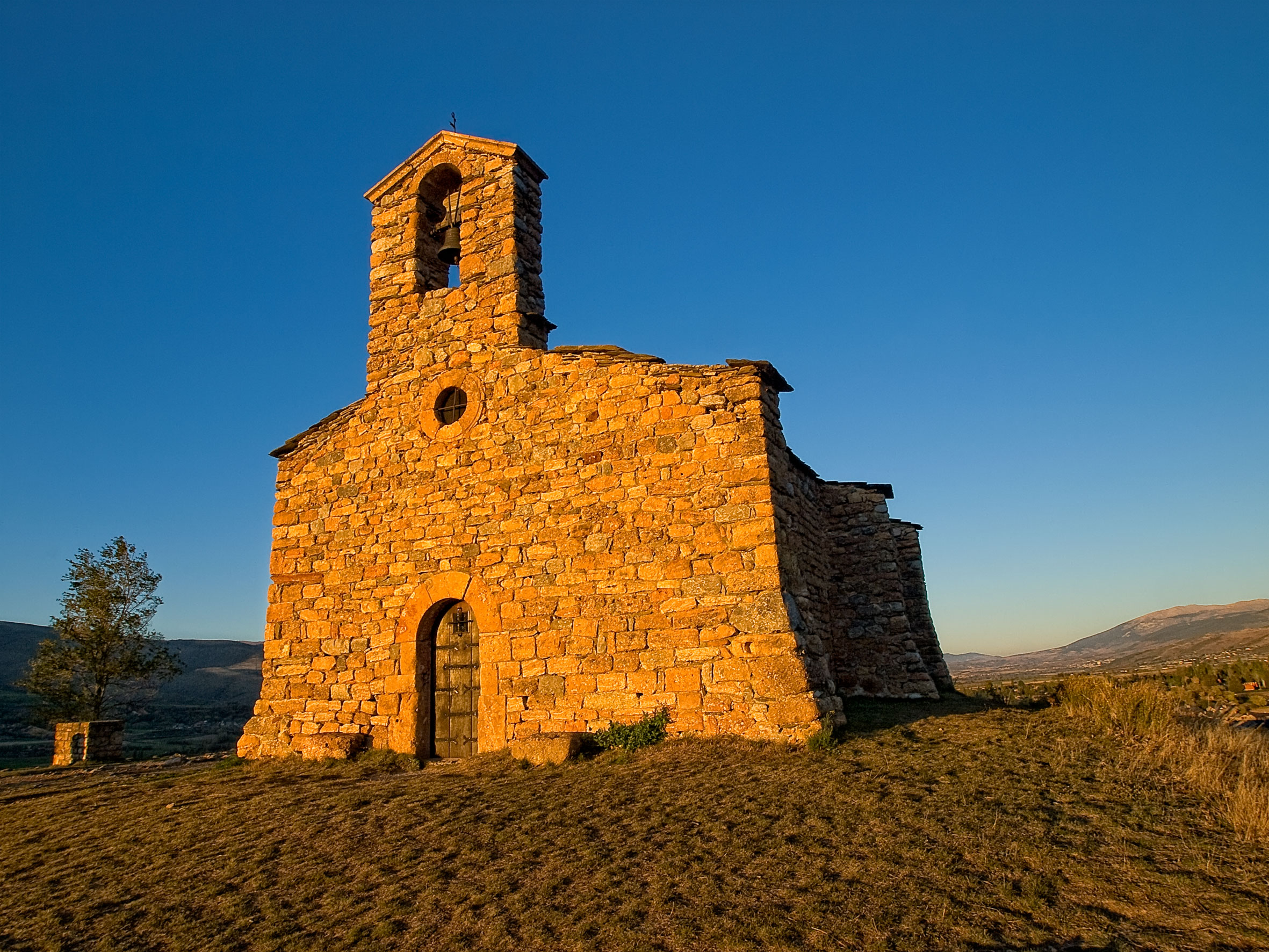

- Flag Coat of arms

- Location in Catalonia Prats i Sansor (Spain)
- Coordinates: 42°22′5″N 1°50′26″E
- Country: Spain
- Autonomous community: Catalonia
- Province: Lleida
- Comarca: Cerdanya

Government
  - Mayor: Jordi Rosell Ginesta (2015)

Area
  - Total: 6.6 km^{2} (2.5 sq mi)
- Elevation: 1,124 m (3,688 ft)

Population (2025-01-01)
  - Total: 252
  - Density: 38/km^{2} (99/sq mi)
- Demonym(s): Pratenc and Sansorenc
- Time zone: UTC+1 (CET)
  - Summer (DST): UTC+2 (CEST)
- Postal code: 25720
- Website: pratssansor.ddl.net

Prats i Sansor (Catalan pronunciation: [ˈpɾadz i sənˈso]) is a municipality in the comarca of Cerdanya, province of Lleida, Catalonia, Spain. It is composed by four villages, Prats, Sansor, Capdevila and El Pla. It has a population of 252 (register office, 2025).

Attractions include the Romanesque Sanctuary of Sant Salvador de Predalies.
