= Alp, Catalonia =

Alp
- Municipality
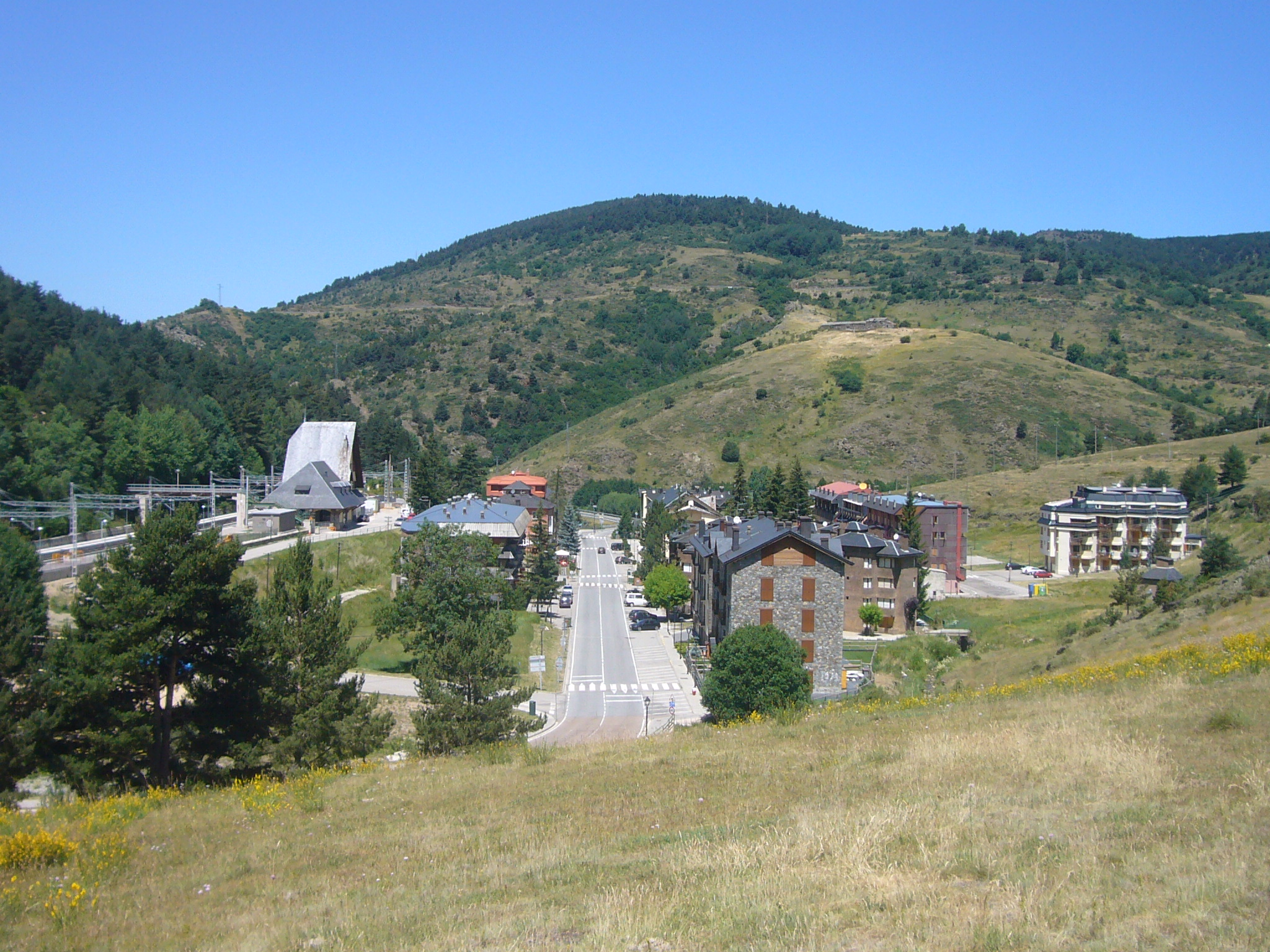

- Location of Alp in Baixa Cerdanya

- Location in Catalonia Alp (Spain)
- Coordinates: 42°22′31″N 1°53′19″E
- Country: Spain
- Autonomous community: Catalonia
- Province: Girona
- Comarca: Cerdanya

Government
  - mayor: Rani Abu Israel Awad (2026-)

Area
  - Total: 44.3 km^{2} (17.1 sq mi)
- Elevation: 1,158 m (3,799 ft)

Population (2025-01-01)
  - Total: 1,724
  - Density: 38.9/km^{2} (101/sq mi)
- Demonym: alpenc/a
- Time zone: UTC+1 (CET)
  - Summer (DST): UTC+2 (CEST)
- Postal code: 17538
- Website: www.alp2500.cat

Alp (Catalan pronunciation: [ˈalp]) is a town and municipality in the comarca of Cerdanya, Province of Girona, Catalonia, Spain. It has a population of 1,724 (register office, 2025).

Alp is home to the ski resort of La Molina.

== See also ==
- Alp 2500
- Tosa d'Alp
