= Jardin ethnobotanique d'Eyne =

Botanical garden in Languedoc-Roussillon, France

Coordinates: 42°28′29″N 2°04′59″E

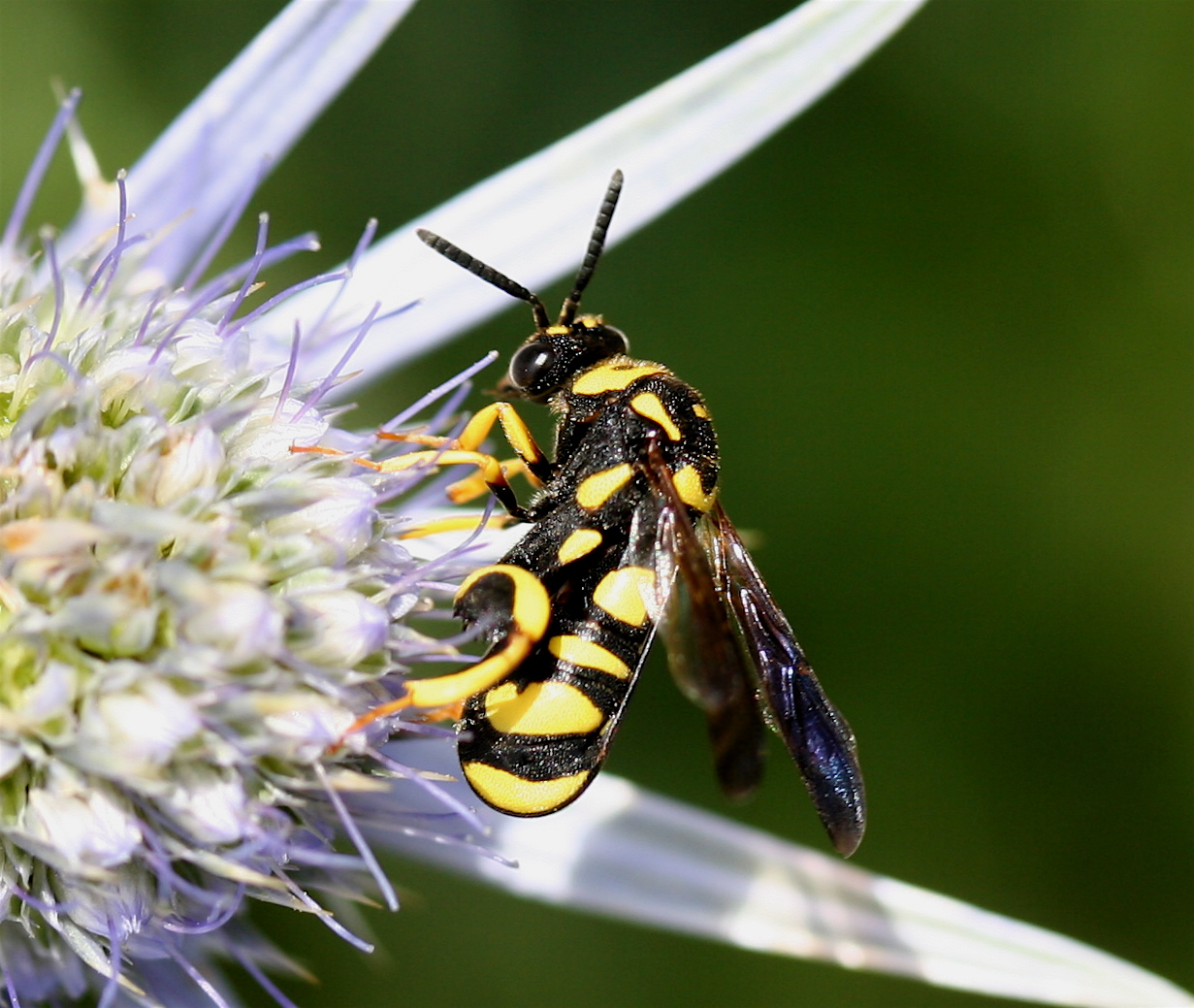

The Jardin ethnobotanique d'Eyne, also called the Jardin de la Vallée, is a botanical garden specializing in ethnobotany. It is located at the Maison de la Vallée, avinguda de Cerdanya, Eyne, Pyrénées-Orientales, Languedoc-Roussillon, France, and is open daily in the warmer months; an admission fee is charged.

Today's garden was created on the site of the farm's earlier vegetable garden. It now contains a representative collection of plants local to the Pyrenees, including trees, flowers, and useful plants, arranged in groupings according to the typical altitude at which the plants grow.

== See also ==
- List of botanical gardens in France
