= Montellà i Martinet =

- Municipality
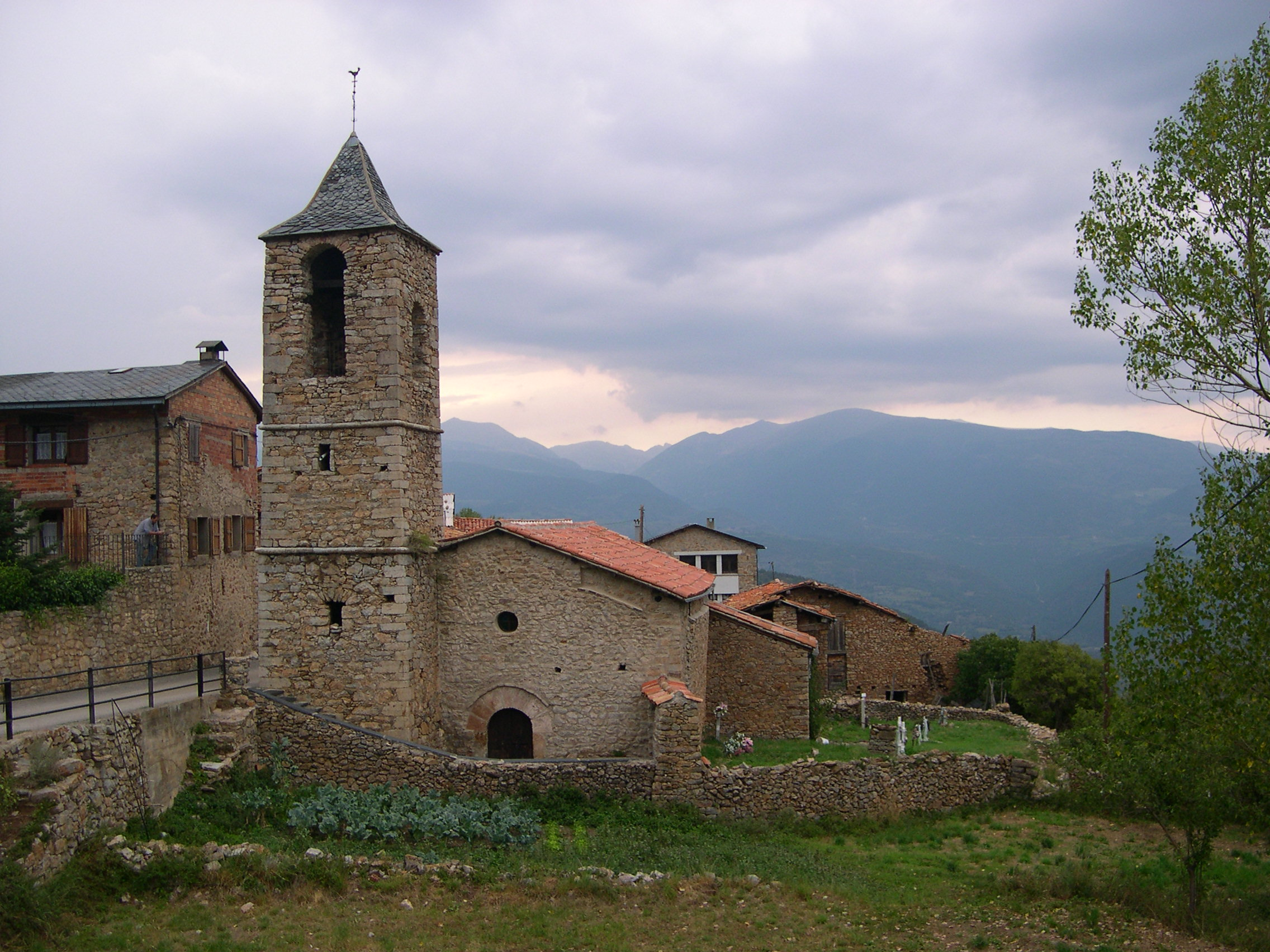
- Church and cemetery, Estana

- Flag Coat of arms

- Location in Catalonia Montellà i Martinet (Spain)
- Coordinates: 42°21′45″N 1°41′47″E
- Country: Spain
- Community: Catalonia
- Province: Lleida
- Comarca: Cerdanya

Government
  - Mayor: Josep Castells Farràs (2015)

Area
  - Total: 55.0 km^{2} (21.2 sq mi)

Population (2025-01-01)
  - Total: 598
  - Density: 10.9/km^{2} (28.2/sq mi)
- Website: montellamartinet.ddl.net

Montellà i Martinet (Catalan pronunciation: [muntəˈʎaj məɾtiˈnɛt]) is a municipality in the comarca of Cerdanya and autonomous community of Catalonia, Spain. It has a population of 598 (register office, 2025).
