= Das, Spain =

Das
- Municipality
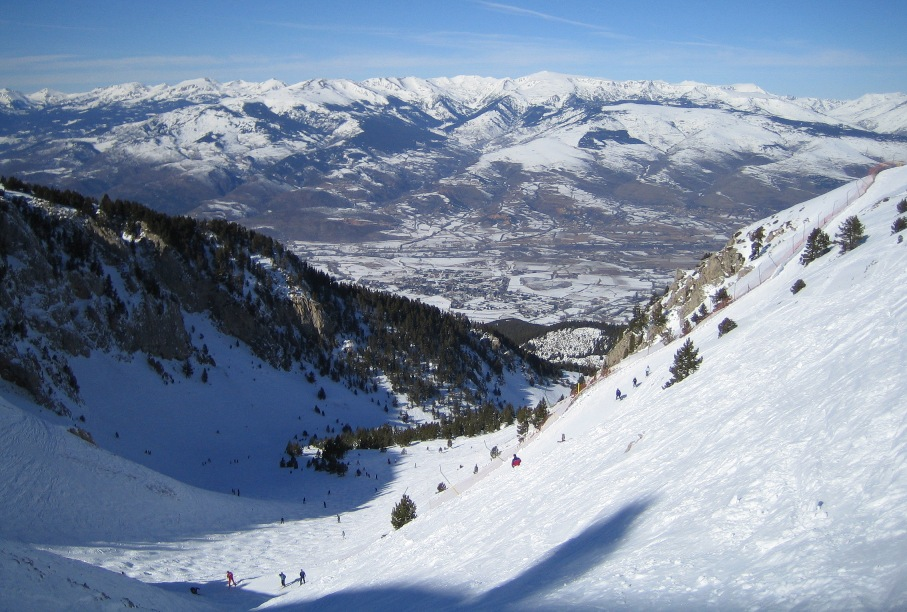
- Coma Oriola, Das

- Location of Das in Baixa Cerdanya

- Location in Catalonia Das (Spain)
- Coordinates: 42°21′48″N 1°52′16″E
- Country: Spain
- Autonomous community: Catalonia
- Province: Girona
- Comarca: Cerdanya

Government
  - mayor: Enric Laguarda Pons (2015)

Area
  - Total: 14.6 km^{2} (5.6 sq mi)
- Elevation: 1,219 m (3,999 ft)

Population (2025-01-01)
  - Total: 261
  - Density: 17.9/km^{2} (46.3/sq mi)
- Demonym: alpenc/a
- Time zone: UTC+1 (CET)
  - Summer (DST): UTC+2 (CEST)
- Postal code: 170617
- Website: www.das.cat

Das (Catalan pronunciation: [ˈdas]) is a town and municipality in the comarca of Cerdanya, Girona Province, Catalonia, Spain. It has a population of 261 (register office, 2025). It is located amidst the mountains of the Pyrenees.

== See also ==
- Tosa d'Alp
