= Eyne =

Eyne Eina
- Commune
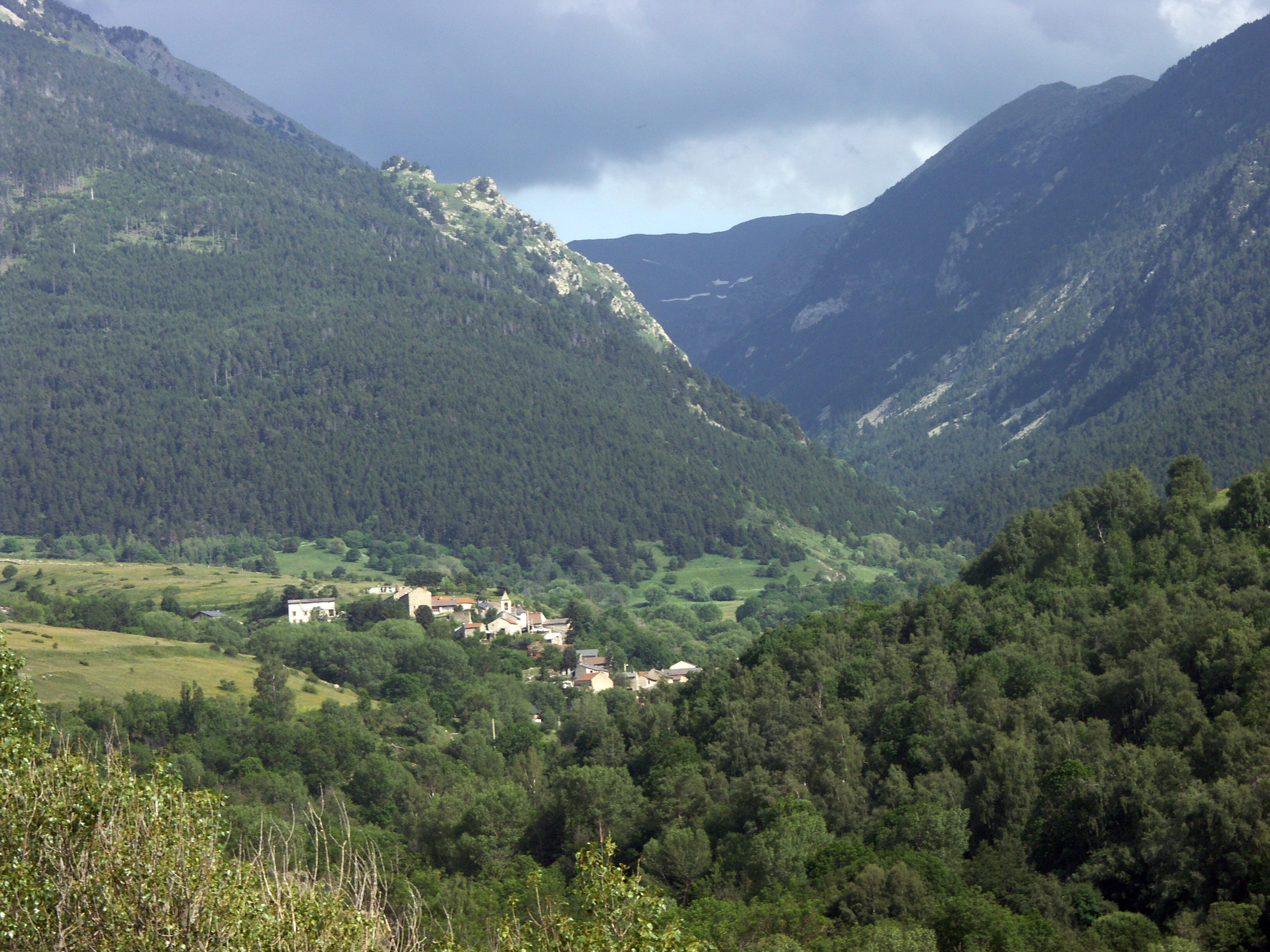
- The village and the valley of Eyne
- Location of Eyne
- Location within France Location within Occitanie
- Coordinates: 42°28′29″N 2°04′59″E
- Country: France
- Region: Occitania
- Department: Pyrénées-Orientales
- Arrondissement: Prades
- Canton: Les Pyrénées catalanes
- Intercommunality: Pyrénées catalanes

Government
  - Mayor (2020–2026): Alain Bousquet
- Area^{1}: 20.36 km^{2} (7.86 sq mi)
- Elevation: 1,500 m (4,900 ft)
- Highest elevation: 2,827 m (9,275 ft)
- Lowest elevation: 1,470 m (4,820 ft)
- Population (2023): 163
  - Density: 8.01/km^{2} (20.7/sq mi)
- Time zone: UTC+01:00 (CET)
  - Summer (DST): UTC+02:00 (CEST)
- INSEE/Postal code: 66075 /66800
- ^{1} French Land Register data, which excludes lakes, ponds, glaciers > 1 km^{2} (0.386 sq mi or 247 acres) and river estuaries.

Eyne (French pronunciation: [ɛjn]; Catalan: Eina) is a commune in the Pyrénées-Orientales department in southern France.

== Geography ==
=== Localization ===
Eyne is located in the canton of Les Pyrénées catalanes and in the arrondissement of Prades.

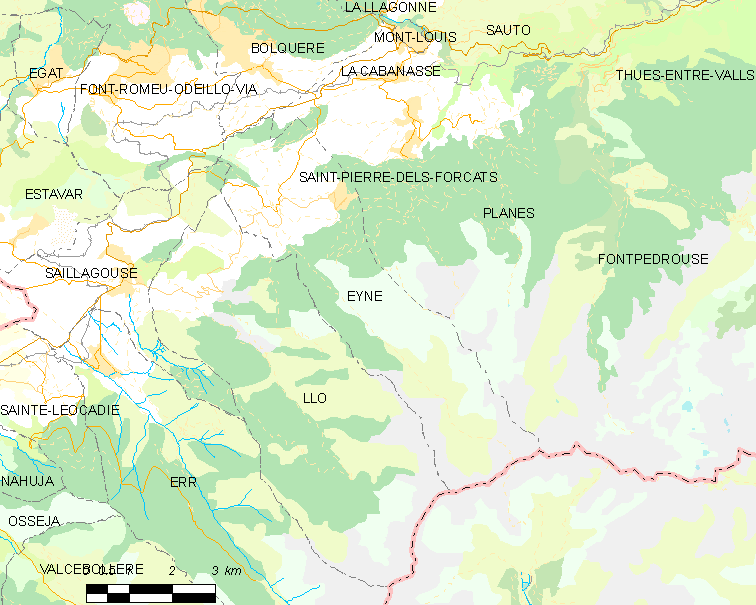
Map of Eyne and its surrounding communes

== Population ==
Historical population
Year	Pop.	±% p.a.
1968	38	—
1975	49	+3.70%
1982	50	+0.29%
1990	84	+6.70%
1999	127	+4.70%
2007	153	+2.36%
2012	128	−3.51%
2017	130	+0.31%
2023	163	+3.84%
Source: INSEE

== Sites of interest ==
- Jardin ethnobotanique d'Eyne

== See also ==
- Communes of the Pyrénées-Orientales department
