= Meranges =

- Municipality
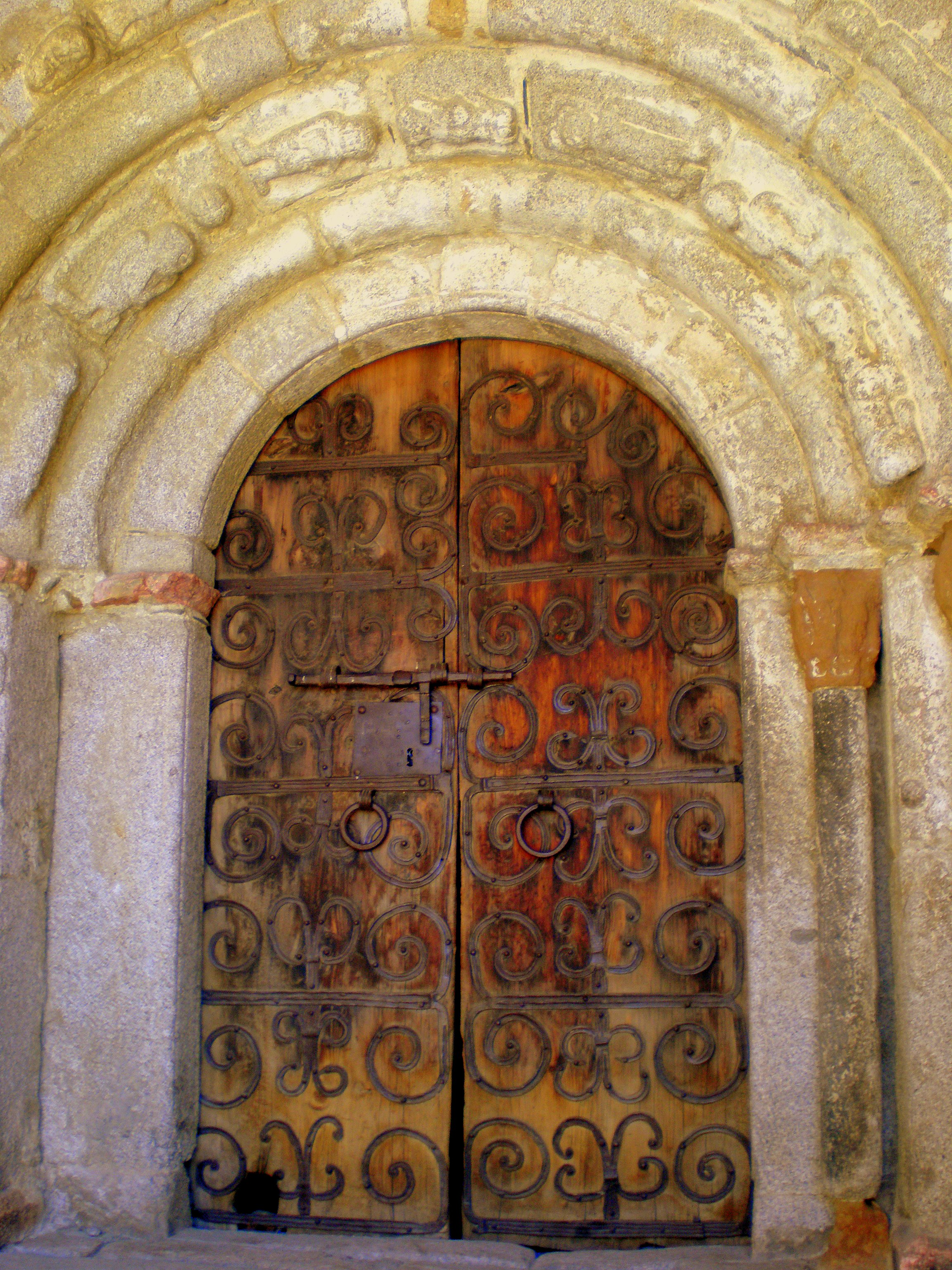
- Portal of the church of Sant Serni.

- Flag Coat of arms

- Location in Catalonia Meranges (Spain)
- Coordinates: 42°26′44″N 1°47′15″E
- Country: Spain
- Autonomous community: Catalonia
- Province: Girona
- Comarca: Cerdanya

Government
  - Mayor: Esteve Avellanet i Tarrés

Area
  - Total: 37.3 km^{2} (14.4 sq mi)
- Elevation: 1,539 m (5,049 ft)

Population (2025-01-01)
  - Total: 111
  - Density: 2.98/km^{2} (7.71/sq mi)
- Postal code: 17539
- Website: www.meranges.cat

Meranges (Catalan pronunciation: [məˈɾaɲʒəs]) is a village in the comarca of Cerdanya, province of Girona, Catalonia, north-eastern Spain. It has a population of 111 (register office, 2025).

Attractions include the Romanesque church of Sant Serni. It has a portal with sculpted archivolts.

The territory of the municipality rises to the Engorgs lakes and to Puig Pedrós (2 915 metres), one of the highest mountains in the eastern Pyrenees.

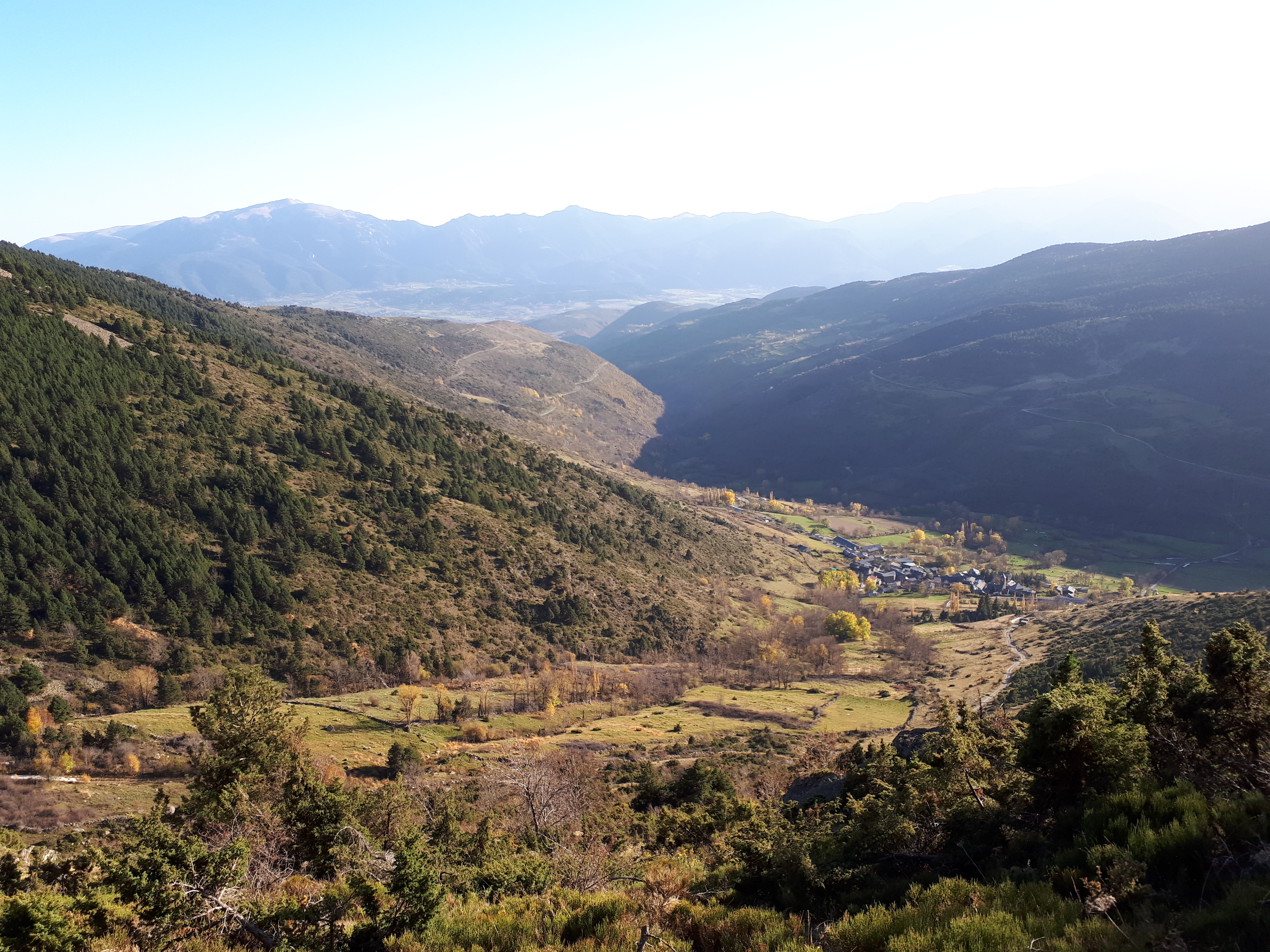
The village of Meranges, Vall Tova, Cerdagne.

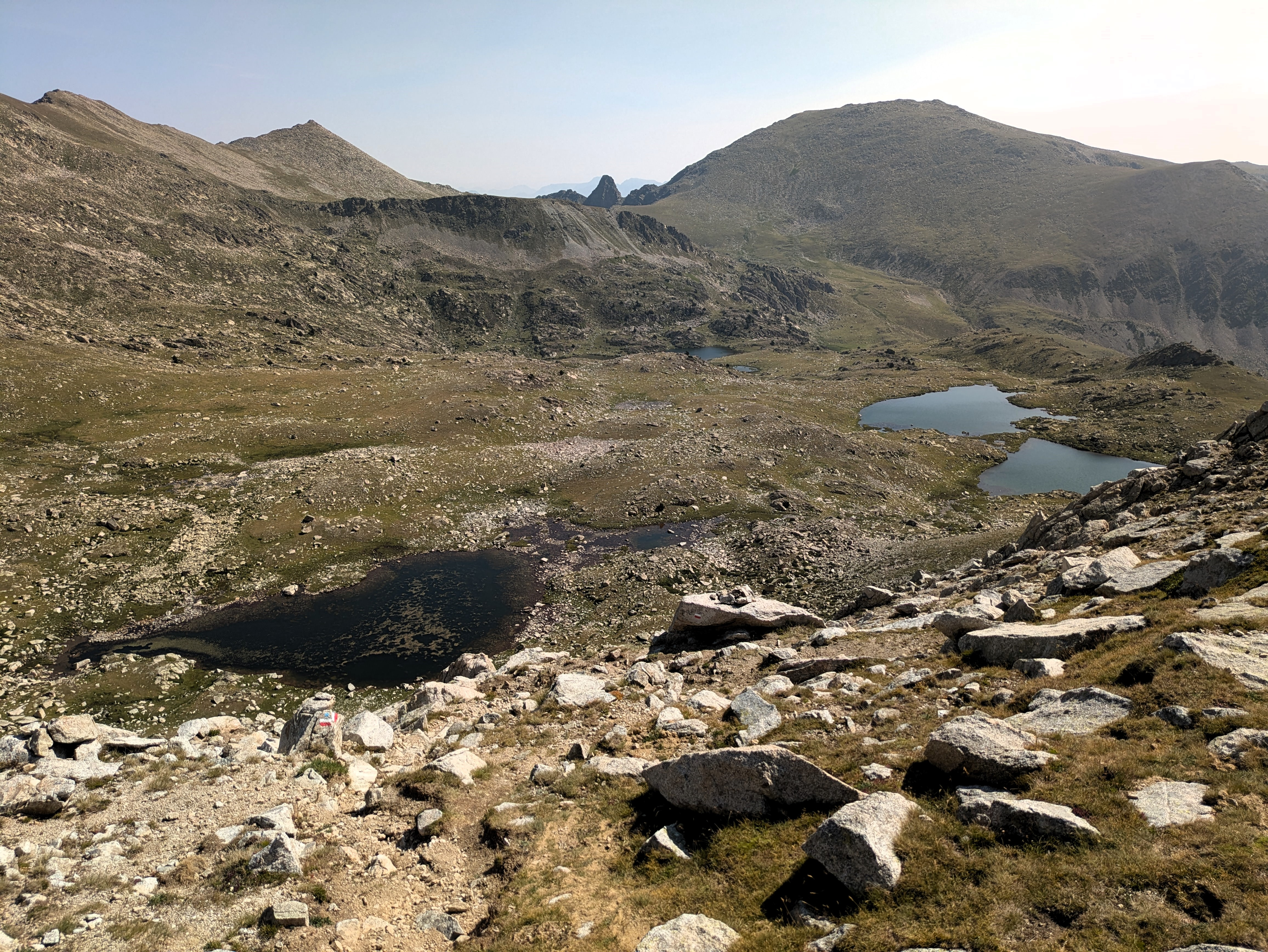
The Engorgs lakes and, beyond, Puig Pedrós.
