= Virgin from Ger =

12th century sculpture

- Artist: Anonymous
- Year: Second half of 12th century
- Type: Wood carving with polychrome in tempera and stucco reliefs
- Dimensions: 51.8 cm × 20.5 cm (20.4 in × 8.1 in)
- Location: Museu Nacional d'Art de Catalunya; Barcelona

The Virgin from Ger is a 12th century sculpture exhibited at the National Art Museum of Catalonia in Barcelona.

== Description ==
Carved images in wood were one of the basic elements of a Romanesque church and were located mainly around the altar. They were placed in prominent positions, but could also be used as reliquaries and sometimes took part in certain liturgical events such as processions.

The Virgin from Ger is one of the most important examples of wood carving from the twelfth century in Catalonia, on account of the type it represents as well as its brilliant technique. To these features must be added its good state of general preservation. Iconographically, it corresponds to the concept of Mary as the Sedes Sapientiae—that is, the seat of wisdom—and symbolises the Church. This is why the figure of the Child appears front-on and rigid, without any sign relating Him to Mary. It is worth pointing out the softness of Mary’s facial features and of the folds of the clothing.

From early twentieth-century photographs we know that this image was retouched and adapted for a new concept of the subject. The Child was moved and placed on Mary’s left knee. This fact is of great interest as it reminds us that some of these works were used outside the period when they were first created and were adapted to the new demands of religious worship and thought.
