= Comabona =

Mountain in Catalonia, Spain

Coordinates: 42°17′01″N 1°43′35″E

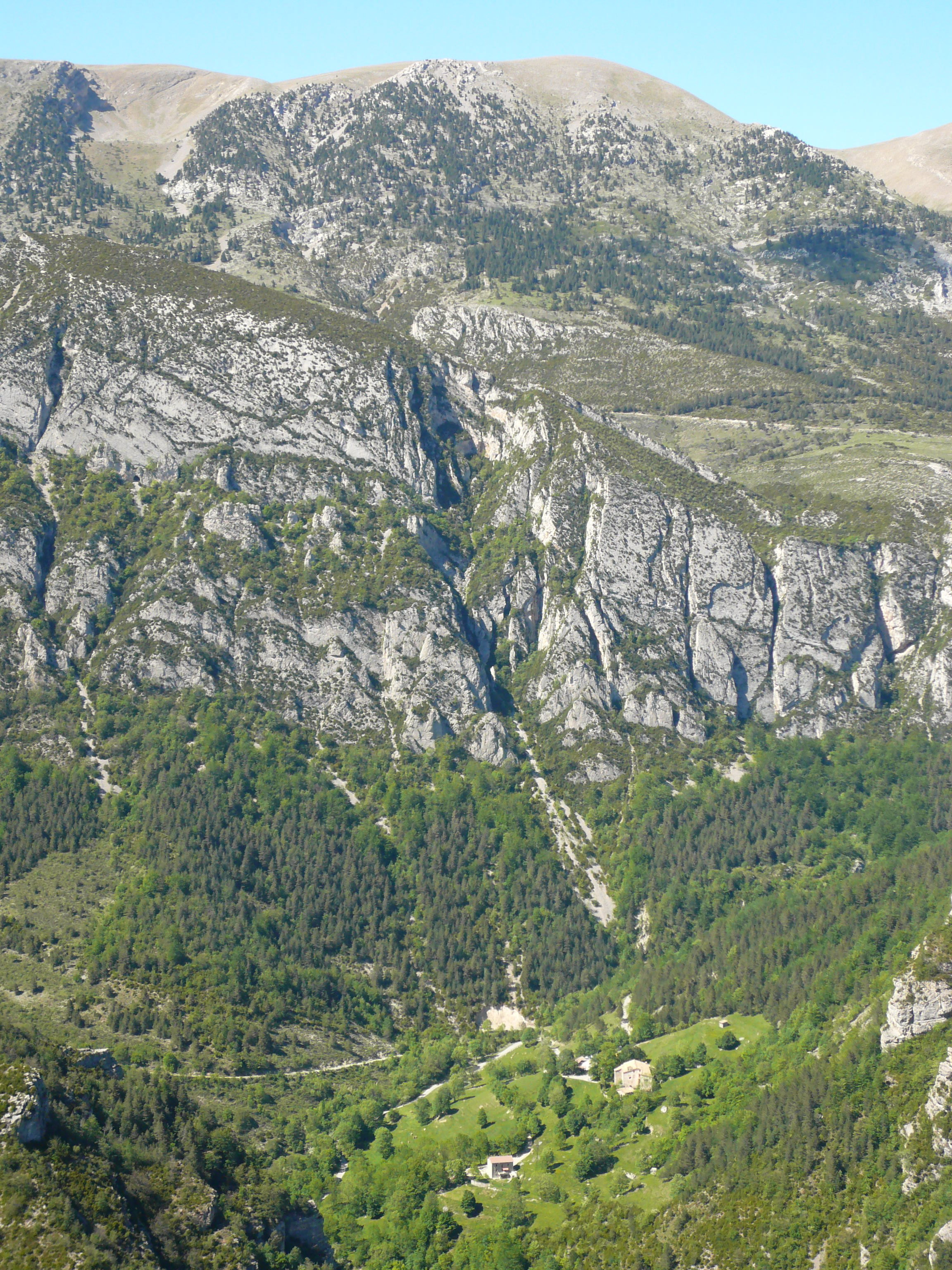
- Comabona and santuari del Gresolet in Saldes, Berguedà, Catalonia

Highest point
- Elevation: 2,547 m (8,356 ft)

Geography
- Location: Catalonia, Spain

Comabona is a mountain of Catalonia, Spain. It has an elevation of 2,547 metres above sea level.

== See also ==
- Mountains of Catalonia
