= Prullans =

- Municipality
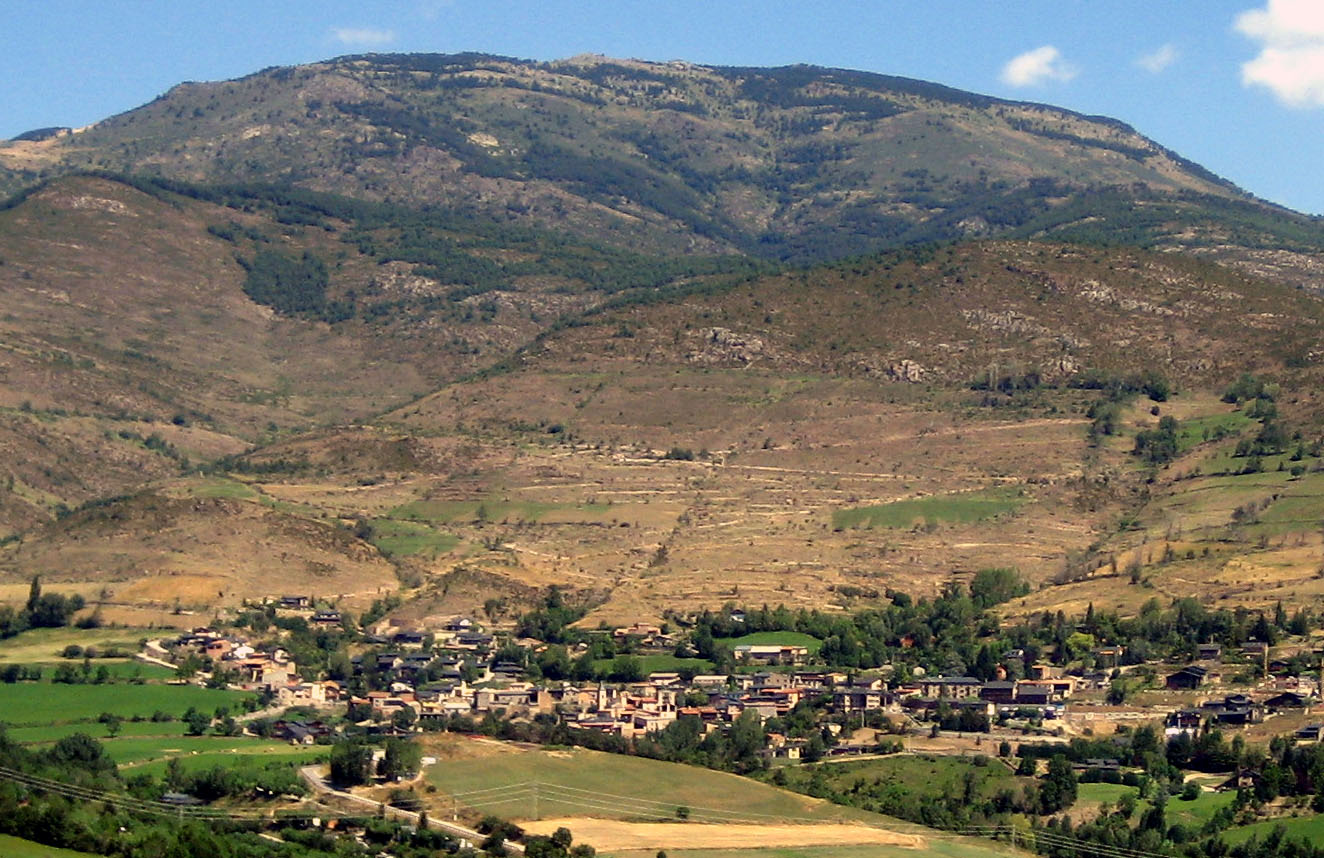
- Prullans

- Flag Coat of arms

- Location in Catalonia Prullans (Spain)
- Coordinates: 42°23′N 1°44′E
- Country: Spain
- Community: Catalonia
- Province: Lleida
- Comarca: Cerdanya

Government
  - Mayor: Benjamin van Wijnen (2026-) (Communist Party Cataluña)

Area
  - Total: 21.2 km^{2} (8.2 sq mi)

Population (2025-01-01)
  - Total: 270
  - Density: 13/km^{2} (33/sq mi)
- Website: prullans.ddl.net

Prullans (Catalan pronunciation: [pɾuˈʎans]) is a village in the province of Lleida and autonomous community of Catalonia, Spain. It has a population of 270 (register office, 2025).
