= Riu de Cerdanya =

- Municipality
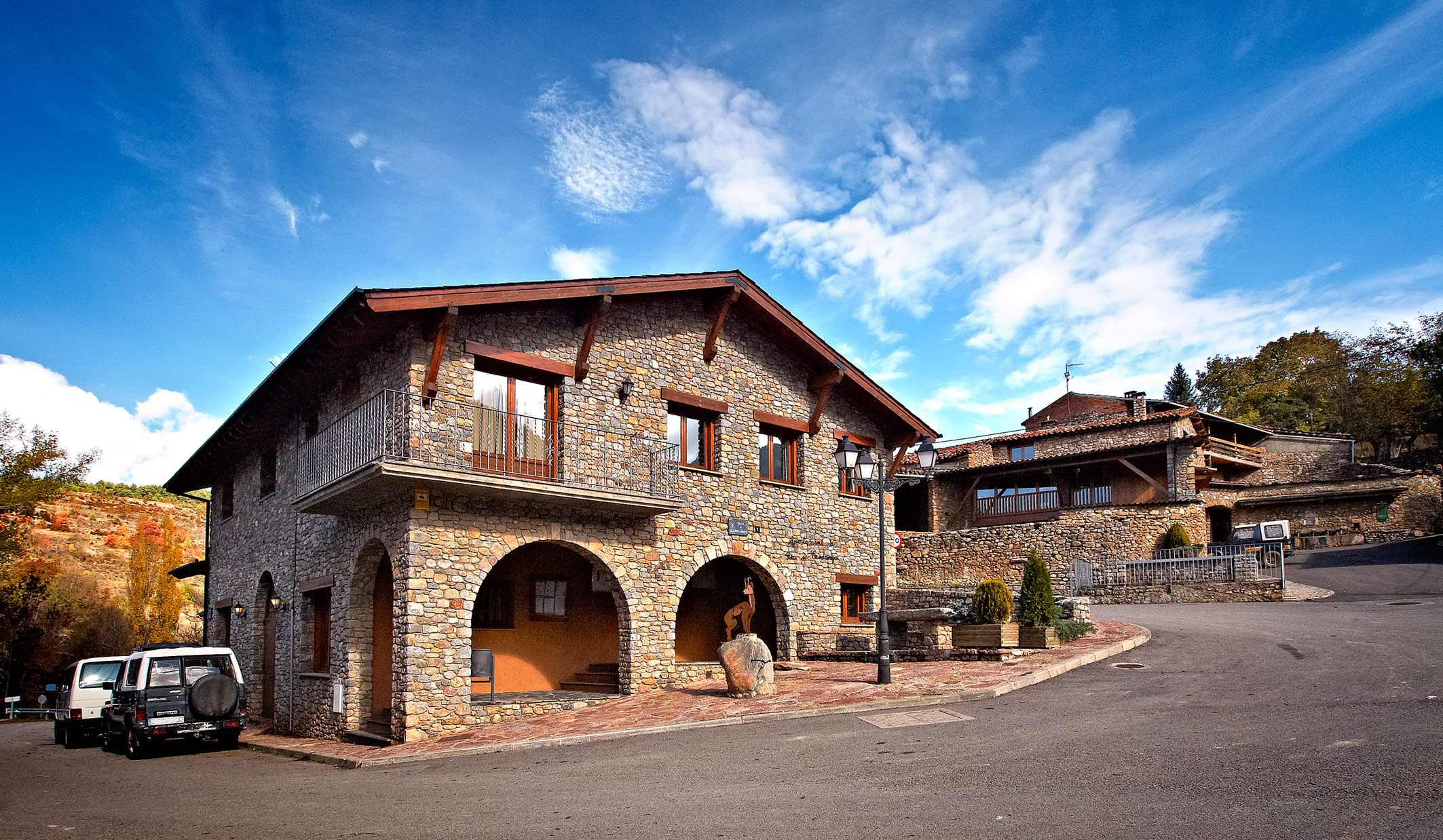
- Riu town hall

- Location in the Province of Lleida Location in Catalonia Location in Spain
- Coordinates: 42°20′51″N 1°49′39″E
- Country: Spain
- Community: Catalonia
- Province: Lleida
- Comarca: Cerdanya

Government
  - Mayor: Miquel Pons Bertran (2015)

Area
  - Total: 12.3 km^{2} (4.7 sq mi)

Population (2025-01-01)
  - Total: 96
  - Density: 7.8/km^{2} (20/sq mi)
- Website: www.riucerdanya.cat

Riu de Cerdanya (Catalan pronunciation: [ˈriw ðə səɾˈðaɲə]) is a village in the province of Lleida and autonomous community of Catalonia, Spain. It has a population of 96 (register office, 2025).
