= Isòvol =

- Municipality
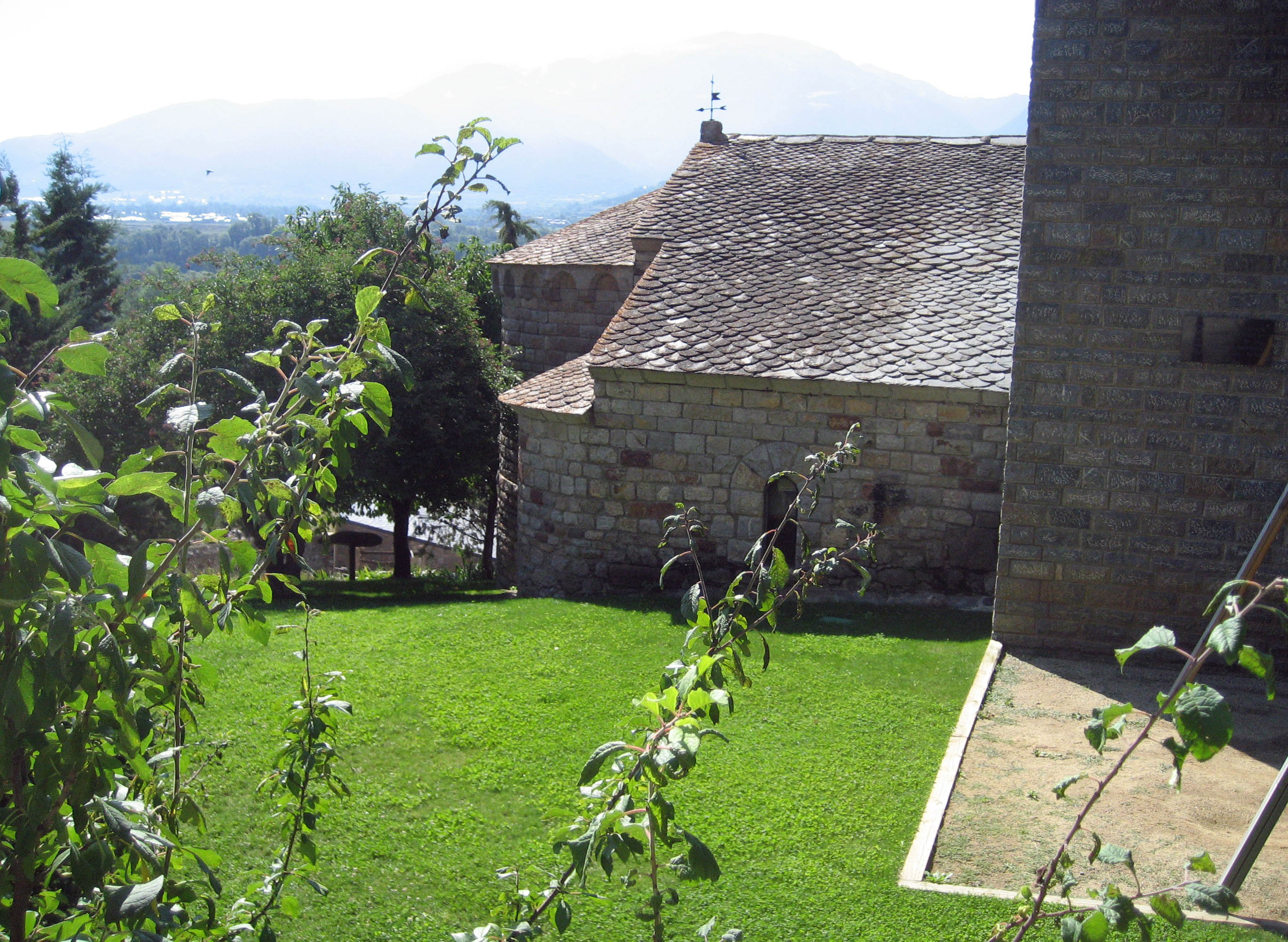
- St. Michael's church, Isòvol

- Flag Coat of arms

- Location in Catalonia Isòvol (Spain)
- Coordinates: 42°23′58″N 1°50′21″E
- Country: Spain
- Community: Catalonia
- Province: Girona
- Comarca: Cerdanya

Government
  - Mayor: Pere Oliu Casamitjana (2015)

Area
  - Total: 10.8 km^{2} (4.2 sq mi)

Population (2025-01-01)
  - Total: 314
  - Density: 29.1/km^{2} (75.3/sq mi)
- Website: www.isovol.cat

Isòvol (Catalan pronunciation: [iˈzɔβul]) is a municipality in the province of Girona and autonomous community of Catalonia, Spain. It has a population of 314 (register office, 2025).

== Religion ==
=== Churches ===
- Church of Santa Maria, All
