= Fontanals de Cerdanya =

- Municipality
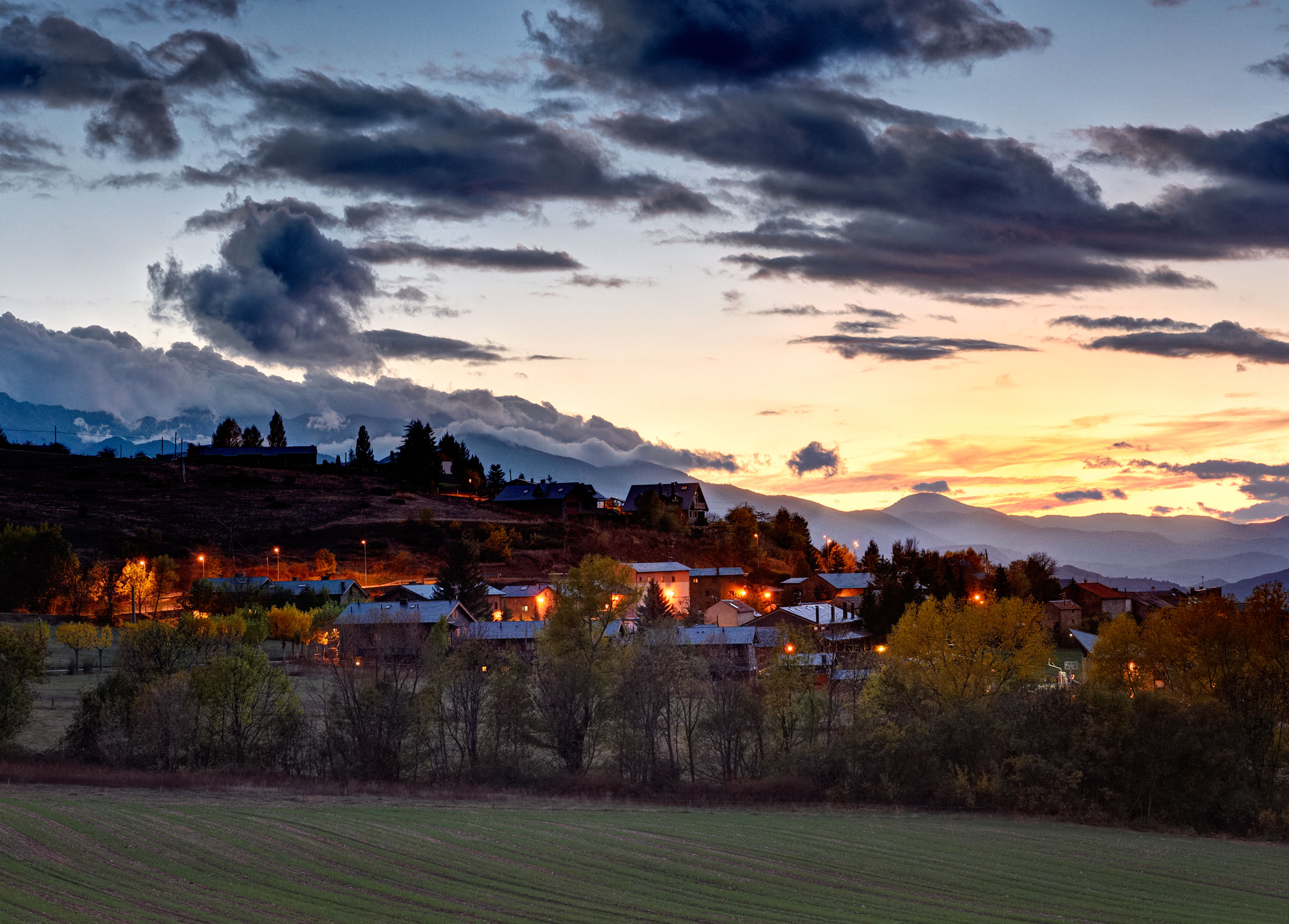

- Flag Coat of arms

- Location in Catalonia Fontanals de Cerdanya (Spain)
- Coordinates: 42.387°N 1.902°E
- Country: Spain
- Community: Catalonia
- Province: Girona
- Comarca: Cerdanya

Government
  - Mayor: Ramon Chia Gálvez (2015)

Area
  - Total: 28.6 km^{2} (11.0 sq mi)

Population (2025-01-01)
  - Total: 516
  - Density: 18.0/km^{2} (46.7/sq mi)
- Website: www.fontanals.cat

Fontanals de Cerdanya (Catalan pronunciation: [funtəˈnalz ðə səɾˈðaɲə]) is a village in the province of Girona and autonomous community of Catalonia, Spain. The municipality covers an area of 28.65 square kilometres (11.06 sq mi) and the population it has a population of 516 (register office, 2025).
