= Bolvir =

- Municipality
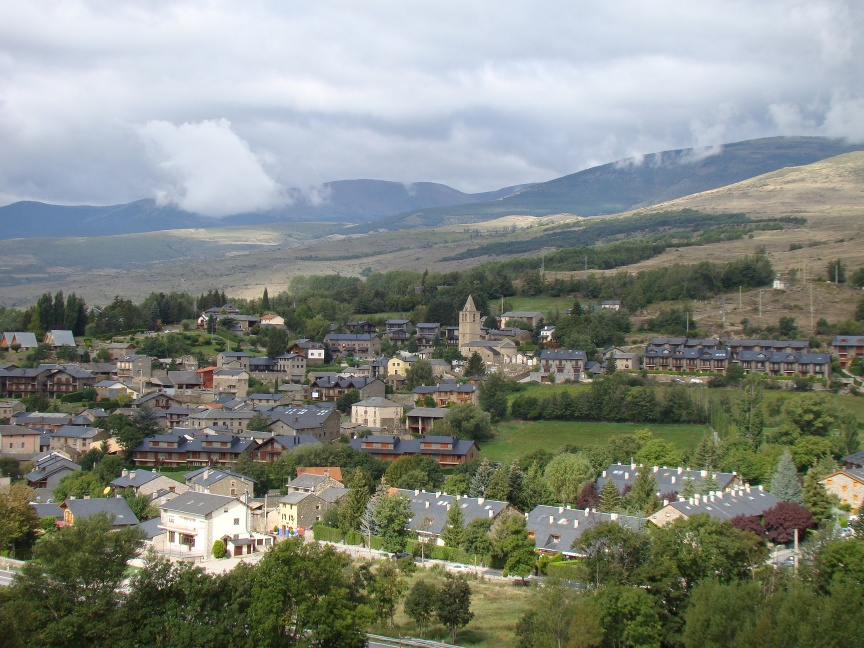

- Coat of arms

- Location in Catalonia Bolvir (Spain)
- Coordinates: 42°25′N 1°53′E
- Country: Spain
- Community: Catalonia
- Province: Girona
- Comarca: Cerdanya

Government
  - Mayor: Bartome Baque Muntane (2015)

Area
  - Total: 10.3 km^{2} (4.0 sq mi)

Population (2025-01-01)
  - Total: 493
  - Density: 47.9/km^{2} (124/sq mi)
- Website: www.bolvir.cat

Bolvir (Catalan pronunciation: [bulˈβi]) is a village in the province of Girona and autonomous community of Catalonia, Spain. The municipality covers an area of 10.34 square kilometres (3.99 sq mi) and it has a population of 493 (register office, 2025).
