= Urús =

- Municipality
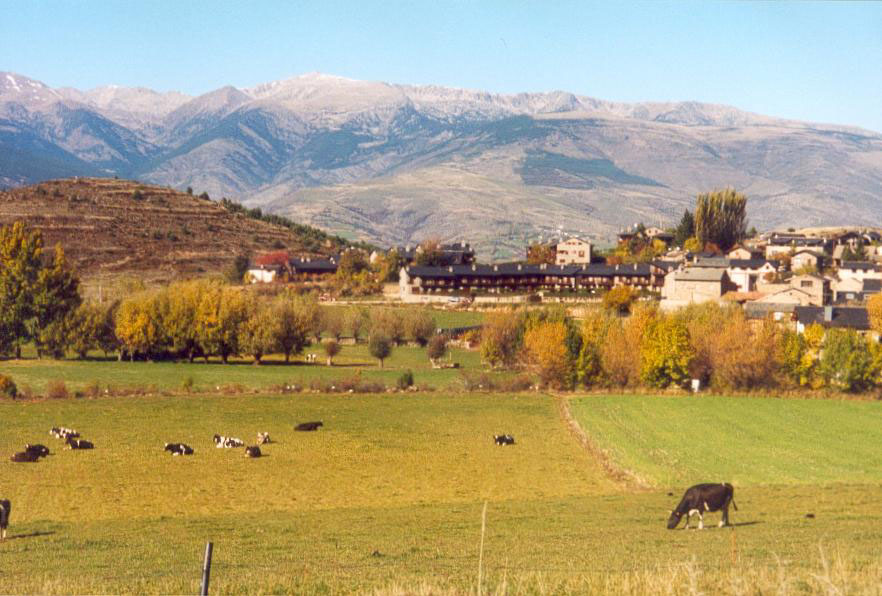
- Urús

- Coat of arms

- Location in Catalonia Urús (Spain)
- Coordinates: 42°21′9″N 1°51′12″E
- Country: Spain
- Community: Catalonia
- Province: Girona
- Comarca: Cerdanya

Government
  - Mayor: Miquel Tor Lliuret (2015)

Area
  - Total: 17.4 km^{2} (6.7 sq mi)

Population (2025-01-01)
  - Total: 201
  - Density: 11.6/km^{2} (29.9/sq mi)
- Website: www.urus.cat

Urús (Catalan pronunciation: [uˈɾus]; locally [ˈgɾus]) is a village in the province of Girona and autonomous community of Catalonia, Spain. It has a population of 201 (register office, 2025).
