= Guils de Cerdanya =

- Municipality
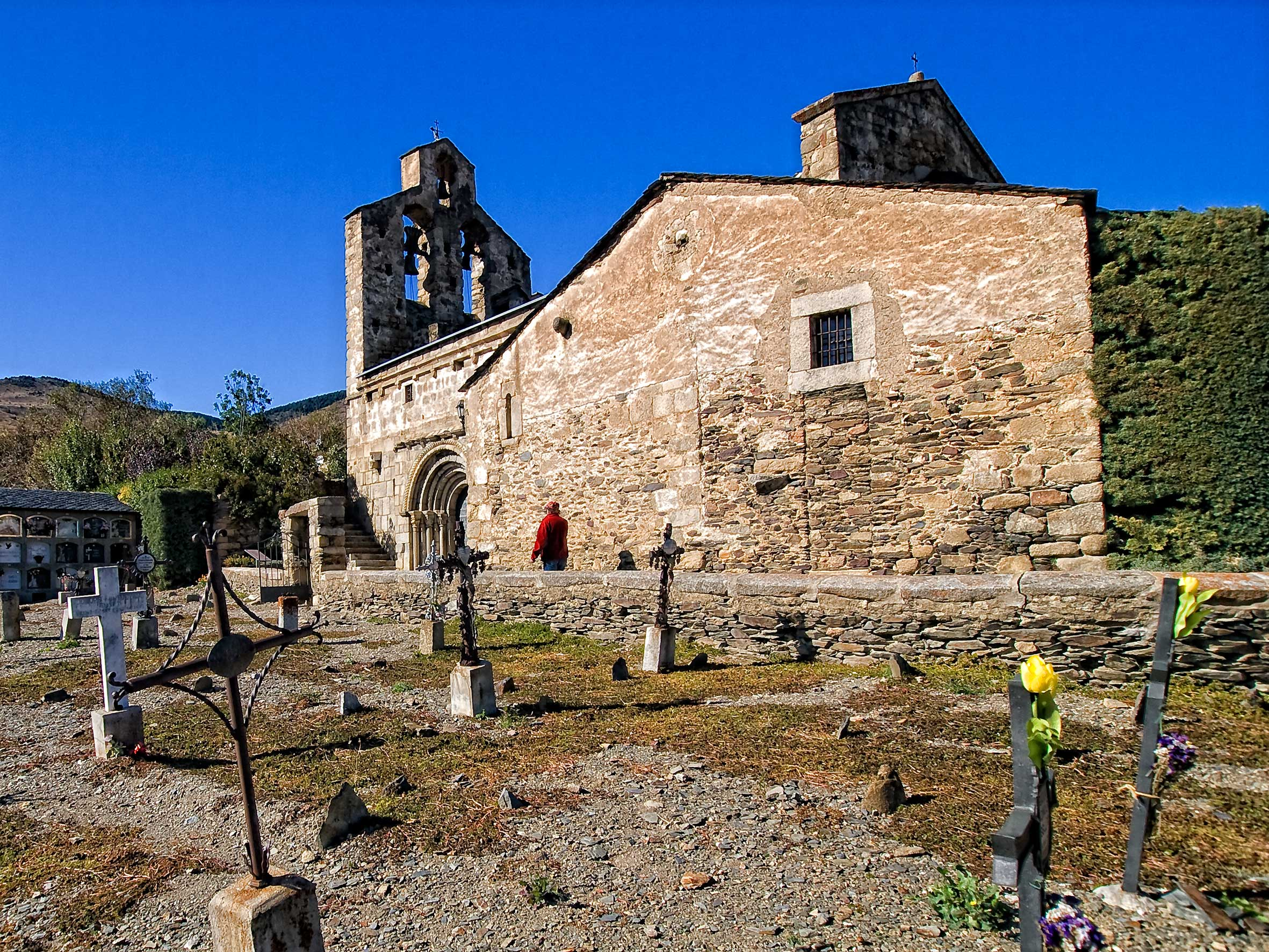
- Church of Sant Esteve.

- Flag Coat of arms

- Location in Catalonia Guils de Cerdanya (Spain)
- Coordinates: 42°27′2″N 1°52′47″E
- Country: Spain
- Autonomous community: Catalonia
- Province: Girona
- Comarca: Cerdanya

Government
  - Mayor: Valentí Tuset Creus (2015)

Area
  - Total: 22.0 km^{2} (8.5 sq mi)
- Elevation: 1,385 m (4,544 ft)

Population (2025-01-01)
  - Total: 557
  - Density: 25.3/km^{2} (65.6/sq mi)
- Demonym: Guilsenc
- Time zone: UTC+1 (CET)
  - Summer (DST): UTC+2 (CEST)
- Postal code: 17528
- Official language(s): Catalan, Spanish
- Website: guils.cat

Guils de Cerdanya (Catalan pronunciation: [ˈgilz ðə səɾˈðaɲə]) is a municipality in the comarca of Cerdanya, province of Girona, Catalonia, Spain. It has a population of 557 (register office, 2025).

Attractions include the Romanesque church of Sant Esteven (12th century).
