= Ger, Spain =

Ger
- Municipality
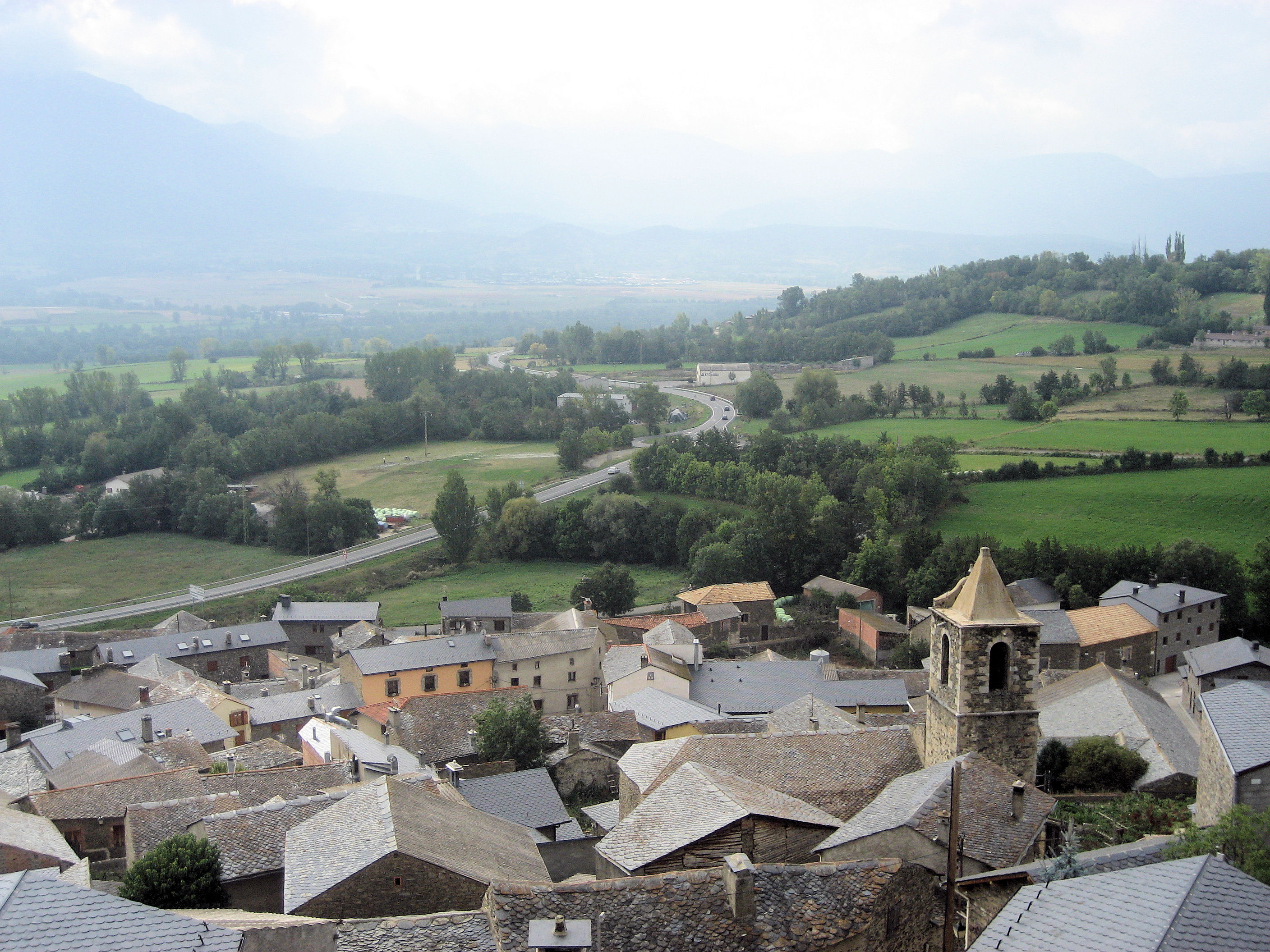

- Flag Coat of arms

- Location in Catalonia Ger (Spain)
- Coordinates: 42°24′38.98″N 1°50′39.27″E
- Country: Spain
- Community: Catalonia
- Province: Girona
- Comarca: Cerdanya

Government
  - mayor: Alfons Casamajó Carrera (2015)

Area
  - Total: 33.4 km^{2} (12.9 sq mi)
- Elevation: 1,135 m (3,724 ft)

Population (2025-01-01)
  - Total: 501
  - Density: 15.0/km^{2} (38.8/sq mi)
- Postal code: 17539
- Website: www.ajger.cat

Ger (Catalan pronunciation: [ˈʒe]) is a village in the province of Girona and autonomous community of Catalonia, Spain. The municipality covers an area of 33.4 square kilometres (12.9 sq mi) and it has a population of 501 (register office, 2025).

== See also ==
- Virgin from Ger, conserved at the National Art Museum of Catalonia
