= Cerdanya (comarca) =

Coordinates: 42°23′21″N 1°47′35″E

- Comarca
- Flag Coat of arms

- Country: Spain
- Autonomous community: Catalonia
- Province: Lleida; Girona
- Region: Alt Pirineu
- Named for: Cerdanya
- Capital: Puigcerdà
- Municipalities: List: Alp, Bellver de Cerdanya, Bolvir, Das, Fontanals de Cerdanya, Ger, Guils de Cerdanya, Isòvol, Lles de Cerdanya, Llívia, Meranges, Montellà i Martinet, Prats i Sansor, Prullans, Puigcerdà, Riu de Cerdanya, Urús

Government
  - Body: Cerdanya Comarcal Council
  - President: Isidre Chia (Junts)

Area
  - Total: 546.6 km^{2} (211.0 sq mi)

Population (2014)
  - Total: 18,063
  - Density: 33.05/km^{2} (85.59/sq mi)
- Demonym(s): cerdà (m.) cerdana (f.)
- Time zone: UTC+1 (CET)
  - Summer (DST): UTC+2 (CEST)
- Largest municipality: Puigcerdà
- Website: https://www.cerdanya.cat

Cerdanya (Catalan pronunciation: [səɾˈðaɲə]; Spanish: Baja Cerdaña, pronounced [ˈbaxa θeɾˈðaɲa]; French: Basse-Cerdagne, pronounced [bɑs sɛʁdaɲ, bas-]) is a comarca in northern Catalonia, in the Pyrenees, on the border of Catalonia with France and Andorra. Within Catalonia, Cerdanya is divided between Catalan provinces of Girona and Lleida. Cerdanya's neighbouring comarques are Alt Urgell, Berguedà, and Ripollès.

Cerdanya is in the "vegueria" of Alt Pirineu, according to "Vegueries of Catalonia law".

The area is sometimes called Baixa Cerdanya ([ˈbaʃə səɾˈðaɲə]; literally "Lower Cerdanya") to distinguish it from Alta Cerdanya ("Upper Cerdanya") which was ceded to France by the Treaty of the Pyrenees in 1659, dividing the wider Cerdanya.

Aerial view of part of Cerdanya.

"Subcomarques" include la Batllia or petita Cerdanya, and el Baridà.

Llívia is a Catalan exclave in Cerdanya, completely surrounded by French territory.

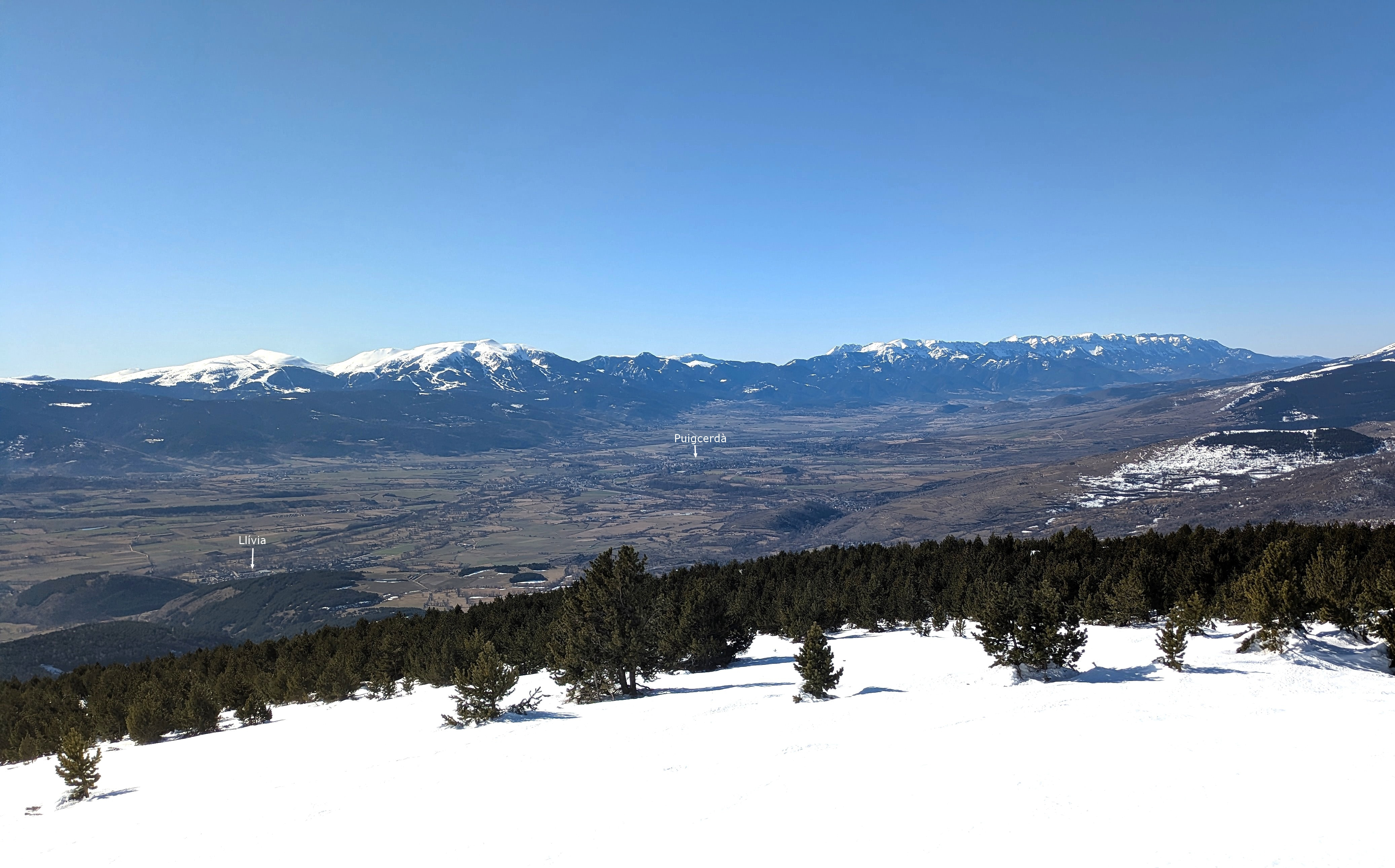
Part of (Baixa) Cerdanya, in the Segre valley.

== Municipalities ==
Municipality	Province	Population (2014)	Area km^{2}
Alp	Girona	1,661	44.3
Bellver de Cerdanya	Lleida	2,075	98.2
Bolvir	Girona	373	10.3
Das	Girona	220	14.6
Fontanals de Cerdanya	Girona	443	28.6
Ger	Girona	432	33.4
Guils de Cerdanya	Girona	536	22.0
Isòvol	Girona	301	10.8
Lles de Cerdanya	Lleida	260	102.8
Llívia	Girona	1,536	12.9
Meranges	Girona	94	37.3
Montellà i Martinet	Lleida	623	55.0
Prats i Sansor	Lleida	248	6.6
Prullans	Lleida	209	21.2
Puigcerdà	Girona	8,761	18.9
Riu de Cerdanya	Lleida	106	12.3
Urús	Girona	185	17.4
• Total: 17		18,063	546.6

== Literature ==
- Peter Sahlins, Boundaries. The Making of France and Spain in the Pyrenees (Berkeley: Univ. of California Press, 1989). ISBN 0-520-07415-7
