= Targasonne =

Targasonne Targasona
- Commune
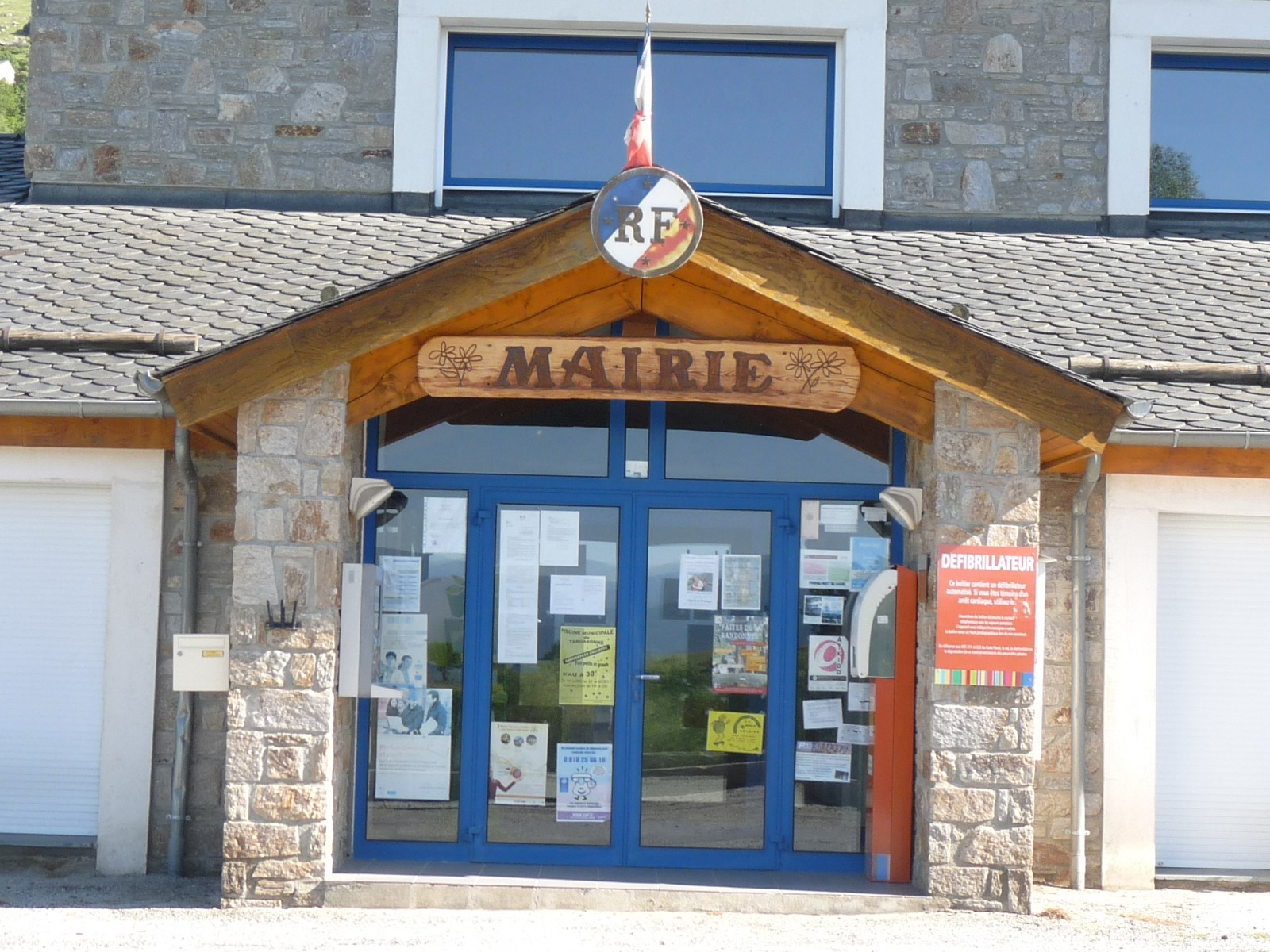
- Town hall
- Location of Targasonne
- Location within France Location within Occitanie
- Coordinates: 42°30′01″N 1°59′52″E
- Country: France
- Region: Occitania
- Department: Pyrénées-Orientales
- Arrondissement: Prades
- Canton: Les Pyrénées catalanes
- Intercommunality: Pyrénées Cerdagne

Government
  - Mayor (2020–2026): Maurice de Gerona
- Area^{1}: 7.80 km^{2} (3.01 sq mi)
- Elevation: 1,597 m (5,240 ft)
- Highest elevation: 2,123 m (6,965 ft)
- Lowest elevation: 1,383 m (4,537 ft)
- Population (2023): 201
  - Density: 25.8/km^{2} (66.7/sq mi)
- Time zone: UTC+01:00 (CET)
  - Summer (DST): UTC+02:00 (CEST)
- INSEE/Postal code: 66202 /66120
- ^{1} French Land Register data, which excludes lakes, ponds, glaciers > 1 km^{2} (0.386 sq mi or 247 acres) and river estuaries.

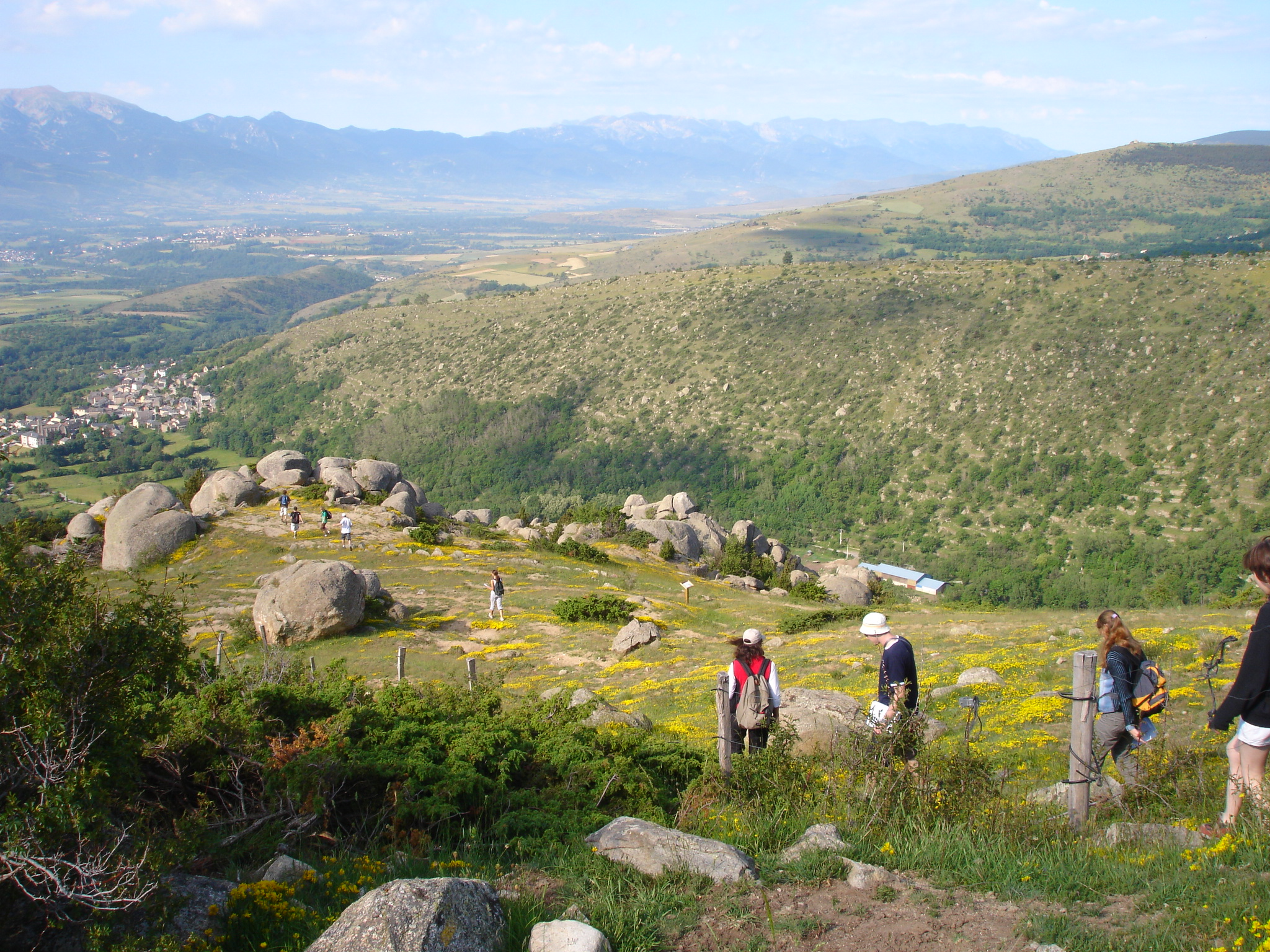
Hiking Trail near Targasonne.

Targasonne (French pronunciation: [taʁɡasɔn]; Catalan: Targasona; before 2022: Targassonne) is a commune of Cerdanya in the Pyrénées-Orientales department in south of France.

Targasonne is the home of the THEMIS Solar Power R&D Center.

== Geography ==
Targasonne is located in the canton of Les Pyrénées catalanes and in the arrondissement of Prades very close to the Spanish border and the exclave of Llívia. It is located at 1,600 meters near the villages of Égat and Font-Romeu-Odeillo-Via. The closest cities are Foix 61 kilometres to the northwest, and Perpignan at 90 kilometres to the east.

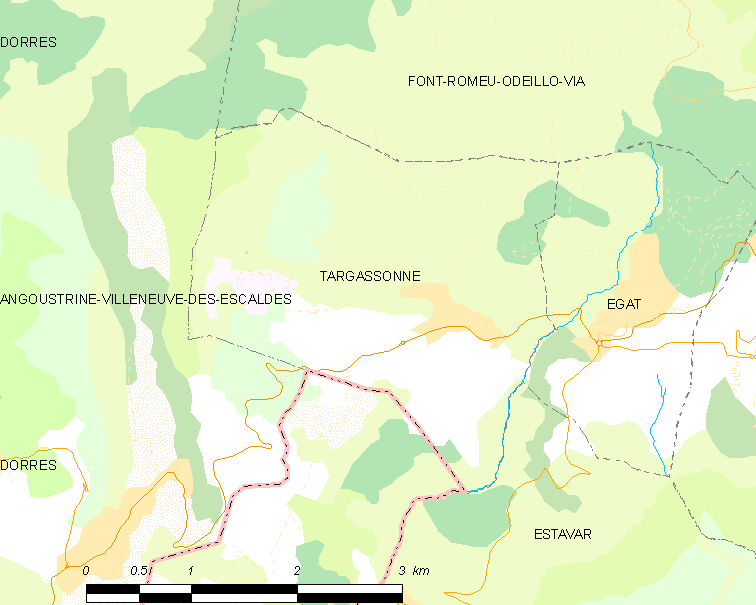
Map of Targasonne and its surrounding communes

== Population ==
Historical population
Year	Pop.	±% p.a.
1968	71	—
1975	65	−1.25%
1982	93	+5.25%
1990	133	+4.57%
1999	203	+4.81%
2007	200	−0.19%
2012	193	−0.71%
2017	184	−0.95%
2023	201	+1.48%
Source: INSEE

== See also ==
- Communes of the Pyrénées-Orientales department
- THEMIS Solar Power R&D Center
- Solar furnace in Odeillo
- Cerdanya
