= Félix Trombe =

French engineer

- Born: 1906; Nogent, France
- Died: 1985 (aged 78–79); Ganties, France
- Engineering career
- Projects: Mont-Louis Solar Furnace
- Significant advance: Trombe wall

Félix Trombe (1906–1985) was a French engineer and speleologist.

He was born in Nogent and died in Ganties. He is best known for his pioneering work in passive solar building design with the Trombe wall, which bears his name. He is also credited with hypothesizing passive daytime radiative cooling in 1967.

== Mont-Louis Solar Furnace ==
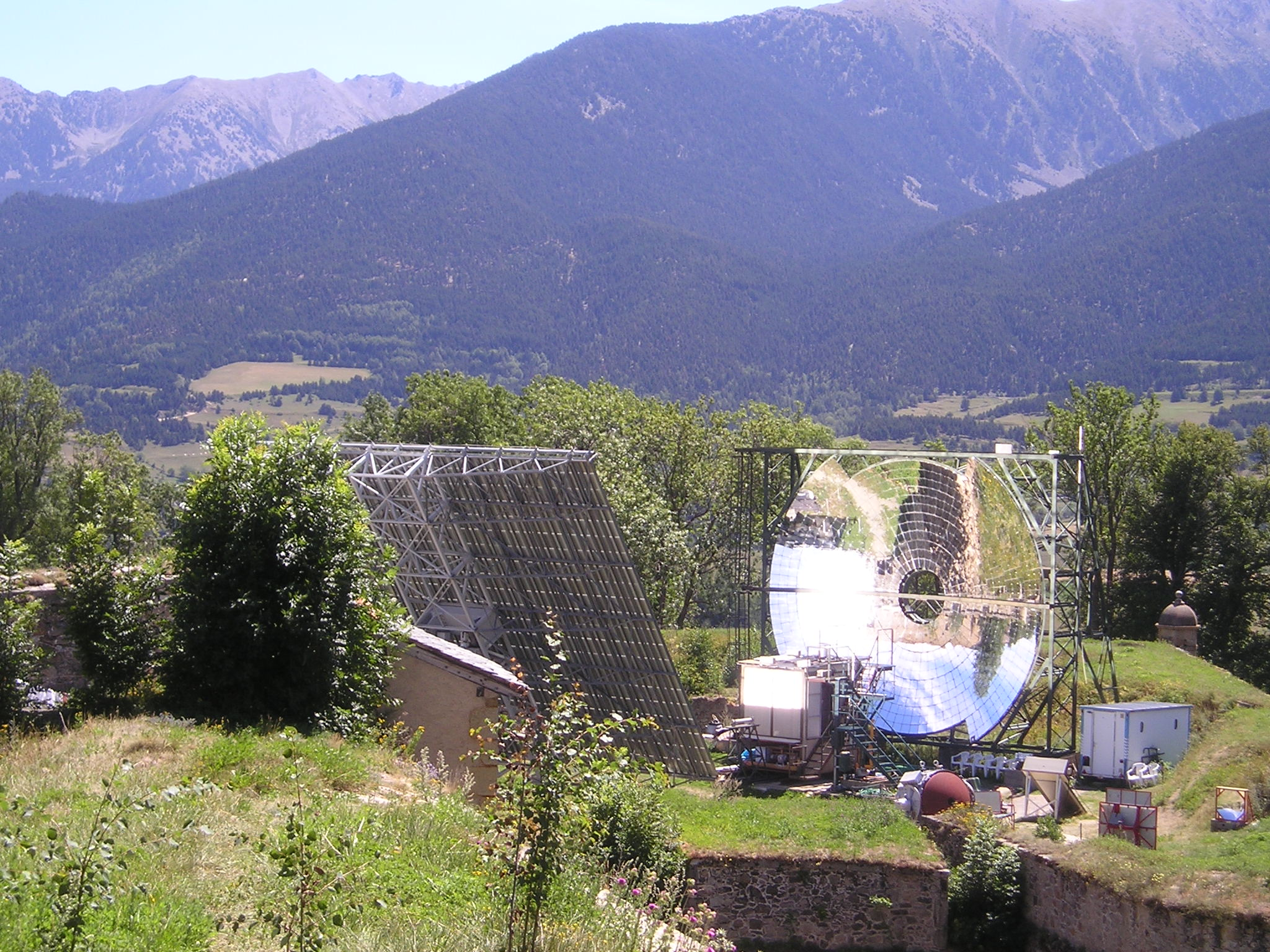
Solar furnace of Mont-Louis

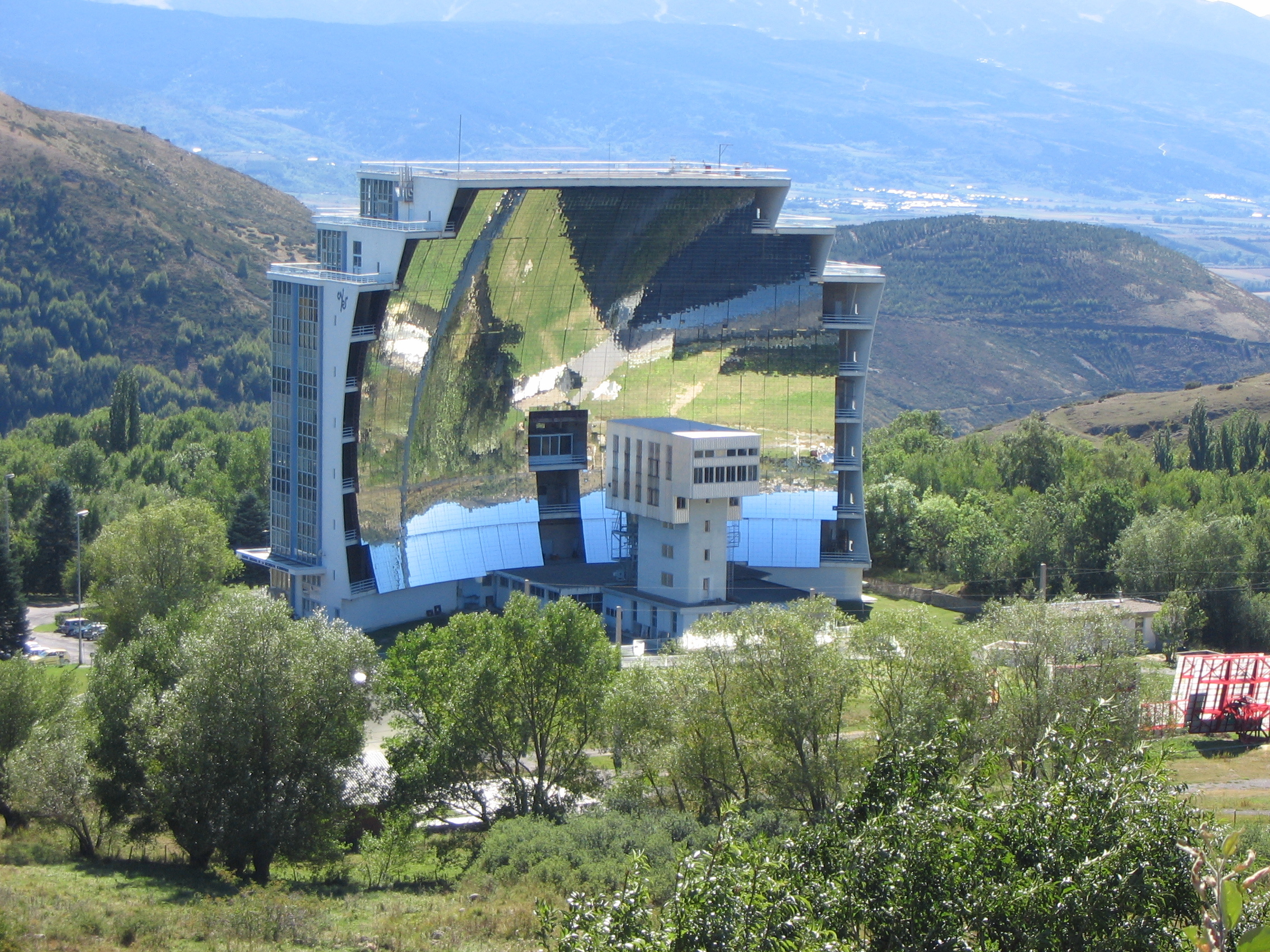
The great 1 MW solar furnace at Odeillo

In 1949 Trombe directed the construction of the experimental 50 kW Mont-Louis Solar Furnace in the Pyrénées-Orientales for high temperature experiments in physics and chemistry. In 1962, a 1000 kW solar furnace was built in Odeillo.

== Speleology ==
In 1934, Félix Trombe explored the underground Comminges.

In 1945, he was a member of the caving commission of the French National Centre for Scientific Research and another commission of the French National Committee of Geodesy and Geophysics. He supported René Jeannel in 1948 during the creation of the National Committee of Speleology, which would become the French Federation of Speleology. He was also one of those who worked on the creation, in 1948, of the underground laboratory of Moulis, a unit of the CNRS responsible for studying cave Troglofauna.

From 6 to 12 August 1947, he took part in the explorations of the underground river of Padirac Cave with Guy de Lavaur and his son Géraud, Jean Lesur and Louis Conduché. Trombe equips the Robert de Joly ledge, then they reach the Grand Chaos. Trombe then analysed the coloured water at the resurgences of the river and proved the link between Padirac and the resurgences under Montvalent.

In 1947, he directed the exploration operations of the Henne Morte chasm, future link in the Réseau Félix Trombe, with the support of soldiers who install an electric cable. On 31 August, Norbert Casteret and Marcel Loubens managed to reach the bottom of the shaft. The France record for depth was reached: −446 metres (−1,463 ft), a level reduced to −358 metres (−1,175 ft) in 1971.
