= Mont-Louis =

- Commune
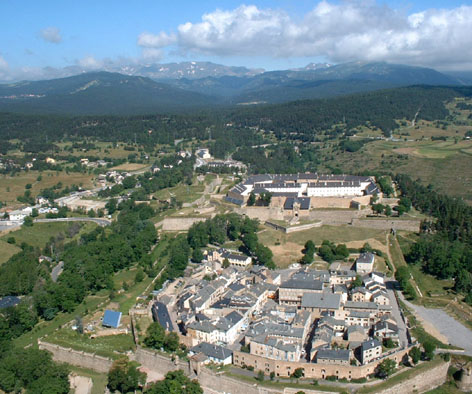
- An aerial view of Mont-Louis

- Coat of arms
- Location of Mont-Louis
- Location within France Location within Occitanie
- Coordinates: 42°30′33″N 2°07′15″E
- Country: France
- Region: Occitania
- Department: Pyrénées-Orientales
- Arrondissement: Prades
- Canton: Les Pyrénées catalanes

Government
  - Mayor (2020–2026): Joëlle Cordelette
- Area^{1}: 0.39 km^{2} (0.15 sq mi)
- Elevation: 1,600 m (5,200 ft)
- Highest elevation: 1,608 m (5,276 ft)
- Lowest elevation: 1,516 m (4,974 ft)
- Population (2023): 153
  - Density: 390/km^{2} (1,000/sq mi)
- Time zone: UTC+01:00 (CET)
  - Summer (DST): UTC+02:00 (CEST)
- INSEE/Postal code: 66117 /66210
- ^{1} French Land Register data, which excludes lakes, ponds, glaciers > 1 km^{2} (0.386 sq mi or 247 acres) and river estuaries.

Mont-Louis (French pronunciation: [mɔ̃ lwi]; Catalan: Montlluís or el Vilar d'Ovansa) is a commune in the Pyrénées-Orientales department in southern France.

== Geography ==
Mont-Louis is located in the canton of Les Pyrénées catalanes and in the arrondissement of Prades. Mont-Louis-La Cabanasse station has rail connections to Villefranche-de-Conflent and Latour-de-Carol.

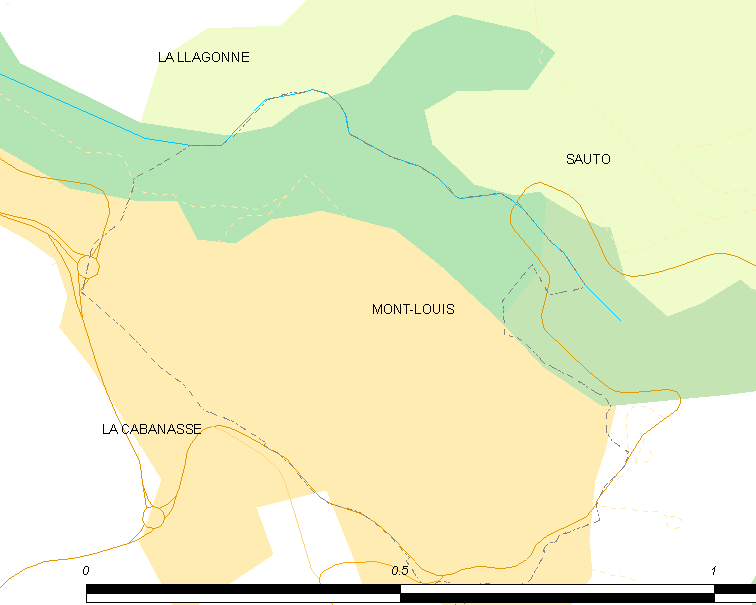
Map of Mont-Louis and its surrounding communes

== Government and politics ==
=== Mayors ===
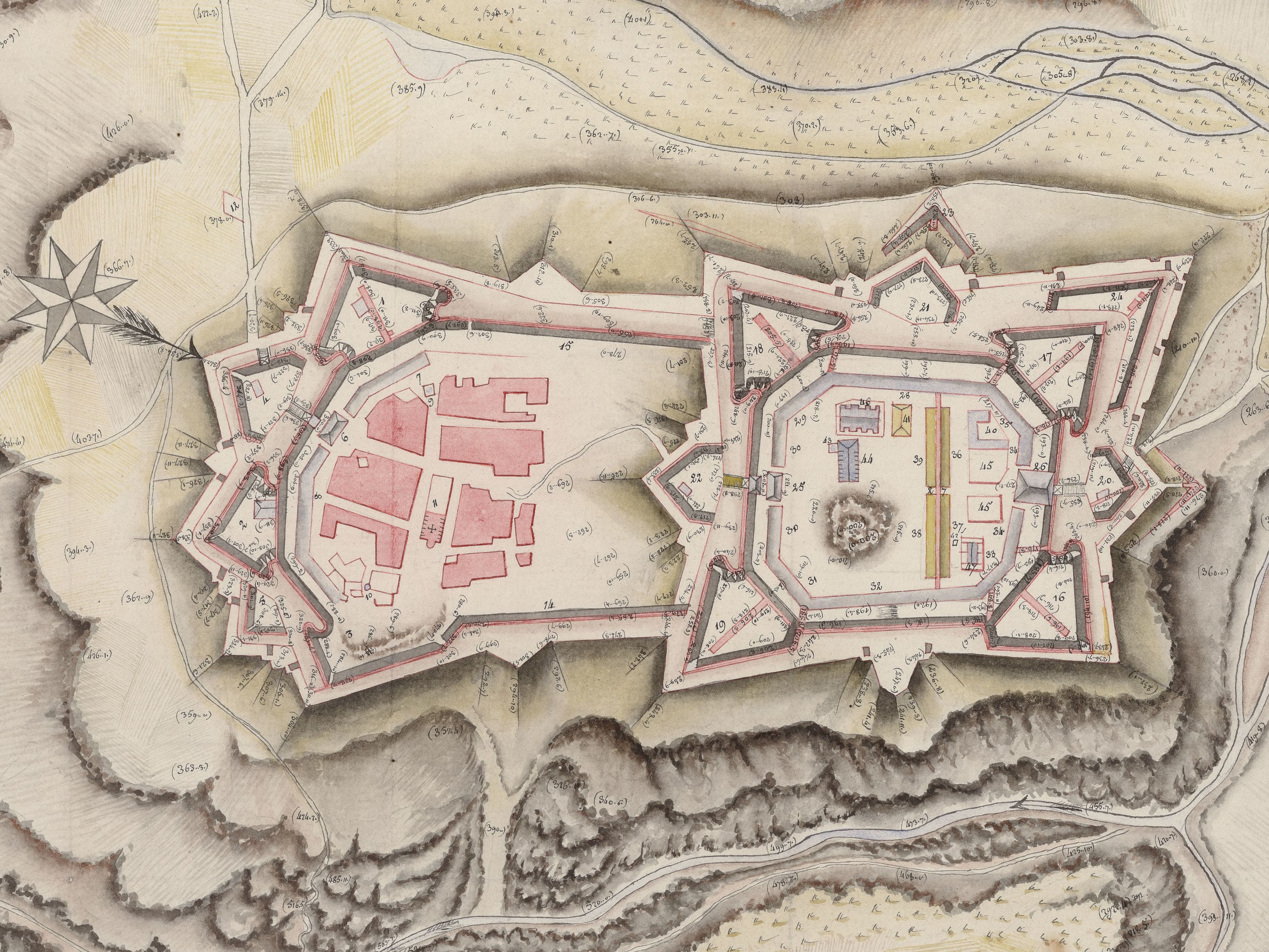
Plan de Mont-Louis 1798

Mayor	Term start	Term end
Michel Aldebert	c. 1815	?
Christian Pécout	2001	2002
Jean-Michel Larmet	2002	2010
Pierrette Cordelette	2010	

== Population ==
Historical population
Year	Pop.	±% p.a.
1968	391	—
1975	250	−6.19%
1982	239	−0.64%
1990	200	−2.20%
1999	270	+3.39%
2007	284	+0.63%
2012	185	−8.22%
2017	152	−3.85%
2023	153	+0.11%
Source: INSEE

== Sites of interest ==
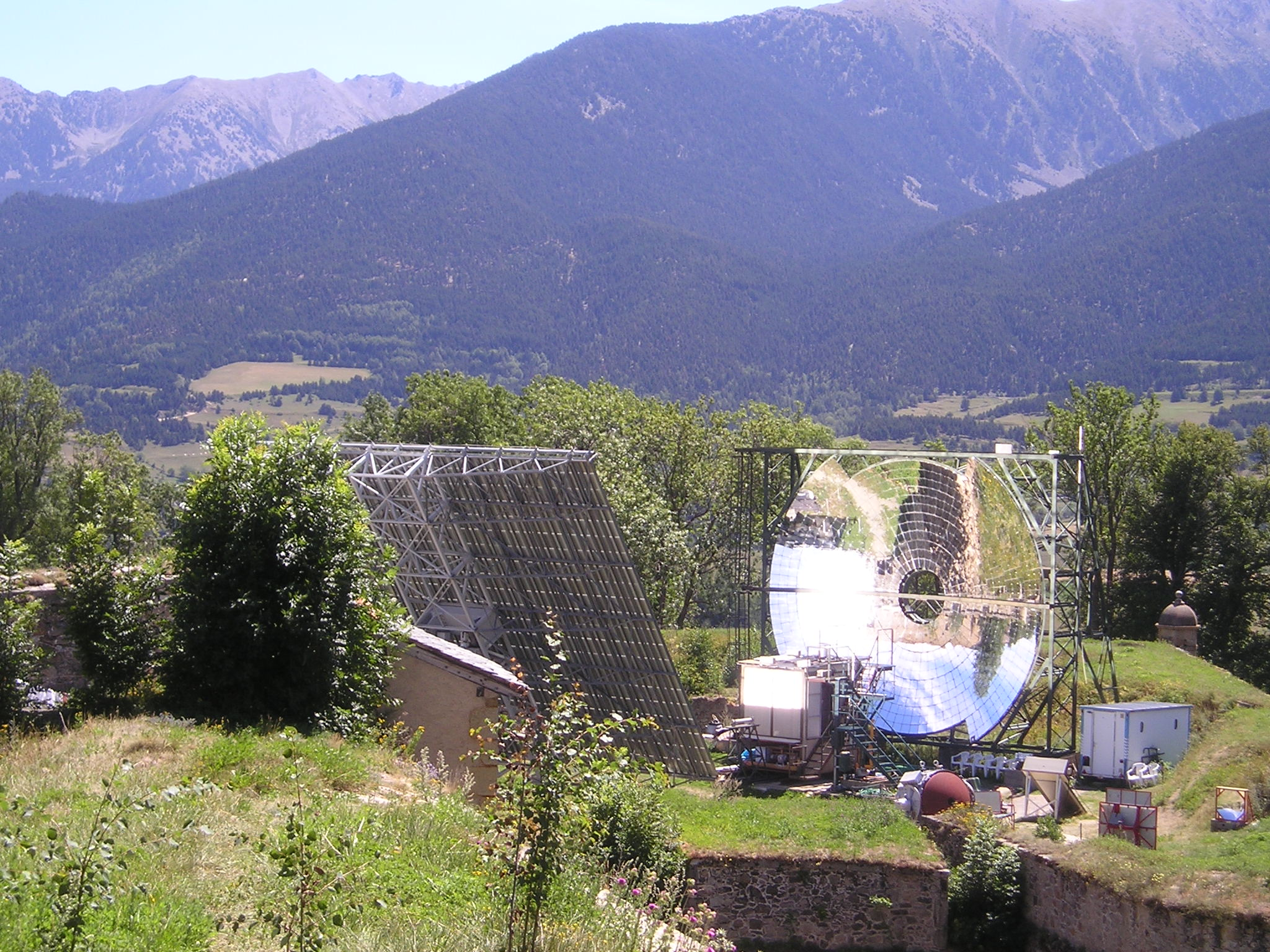
Solar furnace of Mont-Louis

In 2008, the citadel and the city walls of Mont-Louis were listed as part of the Fortifications of Vauban UNESCO World Heritage Site, because of its outstanding engineering and testimony to the development of military architecture in the 17th through 19th centuries.

The Mont-Louis Solar Furnace, is the world's first solar furnace, built in 1949, by engineer Félix Trombe. It is open to visit for practical education on solar energy uses and technologies.

The citadel has been hosting for more than half a century the National Commando Training Center (French Army) which trains elite French troops and some foreign ones in the usage of commando techniques and for enduring heavy physical and mental stress in combat situations. Nevertheless, some places of the citadel, like the "Puits de Forçats", can also be visited, being accompanied by a local guide.

== Notable people ==
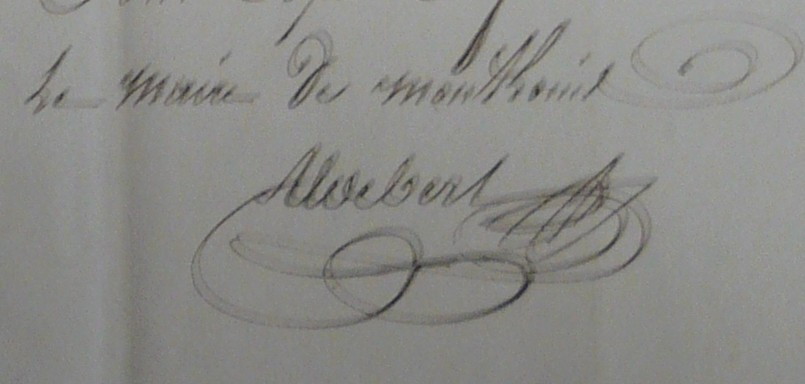
Signature of mayor Michel Aldebert in 1815

- Sébastien Le Prestre de Vauban (1633-1707), military engineer who conceived and directed the construction of Mont-Louis.
- Antoine de Léris (1723-1795), French journalist and drama critic of the 18th century and a historian of the French theatre
- Pedro Étienne Solère (1753–1817), classical clarinetist
- Jean Gilles (1904-1961), French Army general who died in Mont-Louis.

== See also ==
- Communes of the Pyrénées-Orientales department
- Mont-Louis Solar Furnace
- Ligne de Cerdagne
