= Odeillo solar furnace =

World's largest solar furnace

- Four solaire d'Odeillo
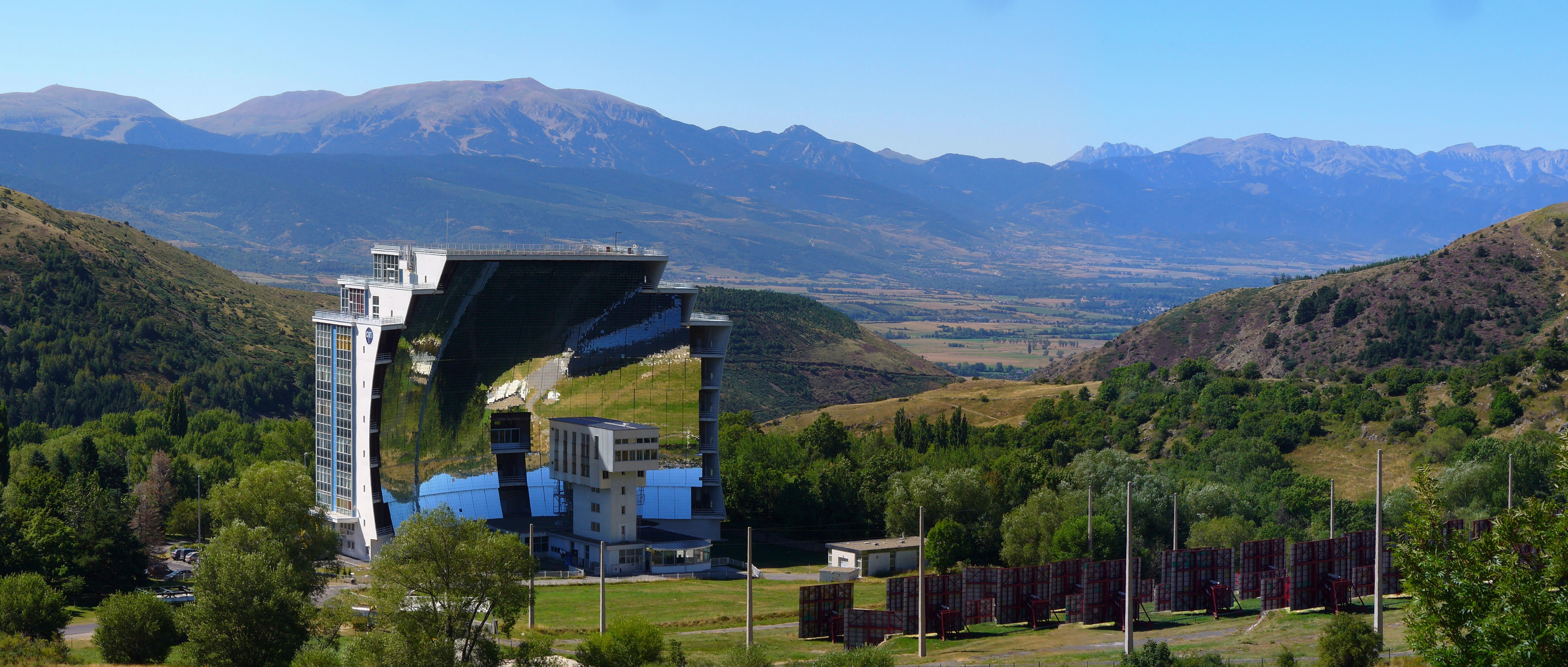
- The solar furnace at Odeillo in the Pyrénées-Orientales in France can reach temperatures up to 3,500 °C (6,330 °F)
- Interactive map of Odeillo solar furnace
- Location: Font-Romeu-Odeillo-Via
- Coordinates: 42.4939°N 2.0292°E
- Width: 54 metres (177 ft)
- Height: 48 metres (157 ft)
- Beginning date: 1962
- Completion date: 1968
- Opening date: 1969

The Odeillo solar furnace is the world's largest solar furnace. It is situated in Font-Romeu-Odeillo-Via, in the department of Pyrénées-Orientales, in the south of France. It is 48 metres (157 ft) high and 54 metres (177 ft) wide, and includes 63 heliostats. It was built between 1962 and 1968, started operating in 1969, and has a power of one megawatt.

It serves as a science research site studying materials at very high temperatures.

== Geography ==
It is situated in Font-Romeu-Odeillo-Via, in the department of Pyrénées-Orientales, region of Occitania, in south of France. The site was chosen because:

- the length and the quality of sunshine with direct light (more than 2,500 h/year);
- the purity of its atmosphere (high altitude and low average humidity).

The solar power plant of Themis and the Mont-Louis Solar Furnace are situated nearby.

== Working principle ==
Working principle

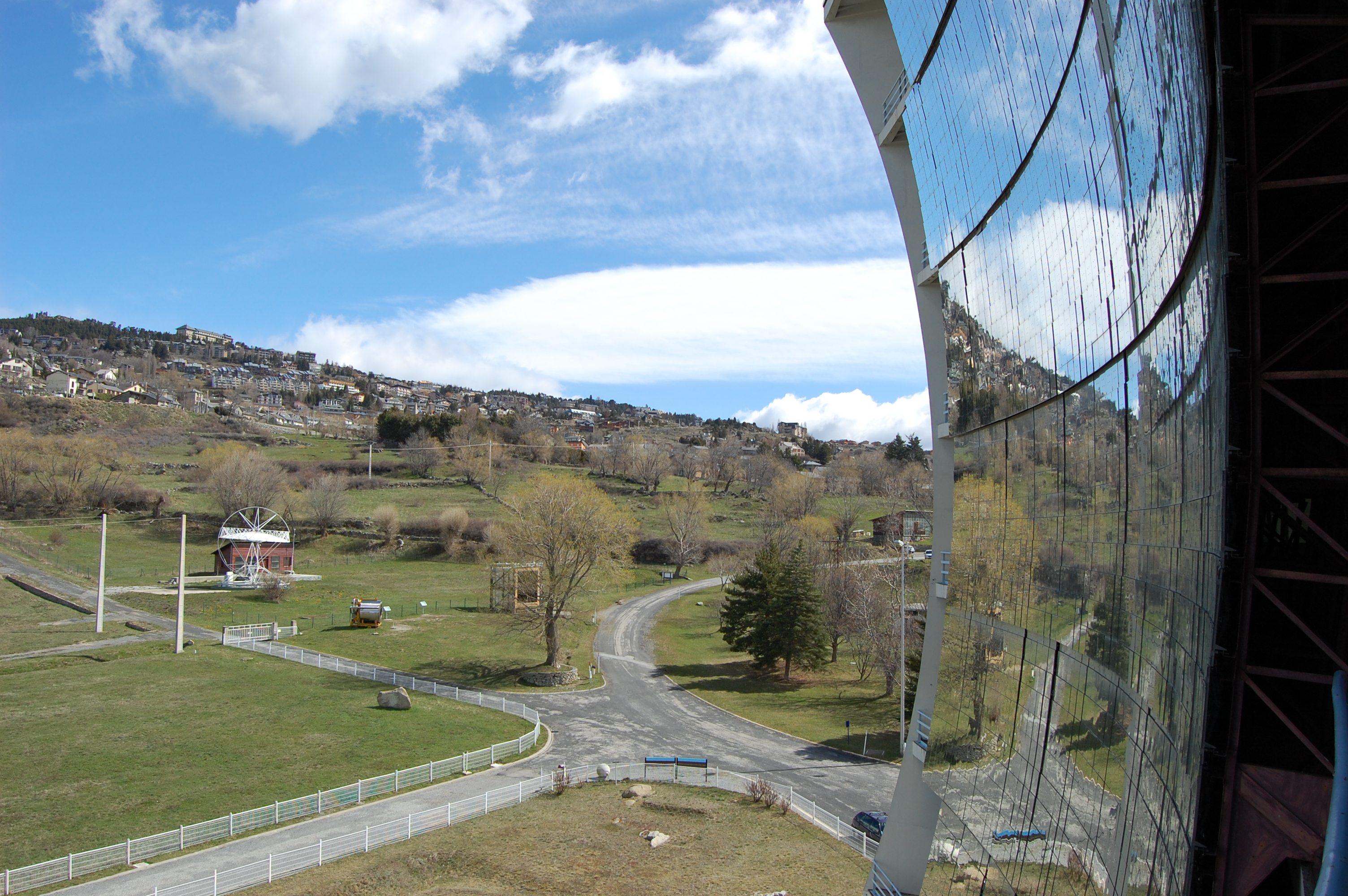
View to the East from the parabola center

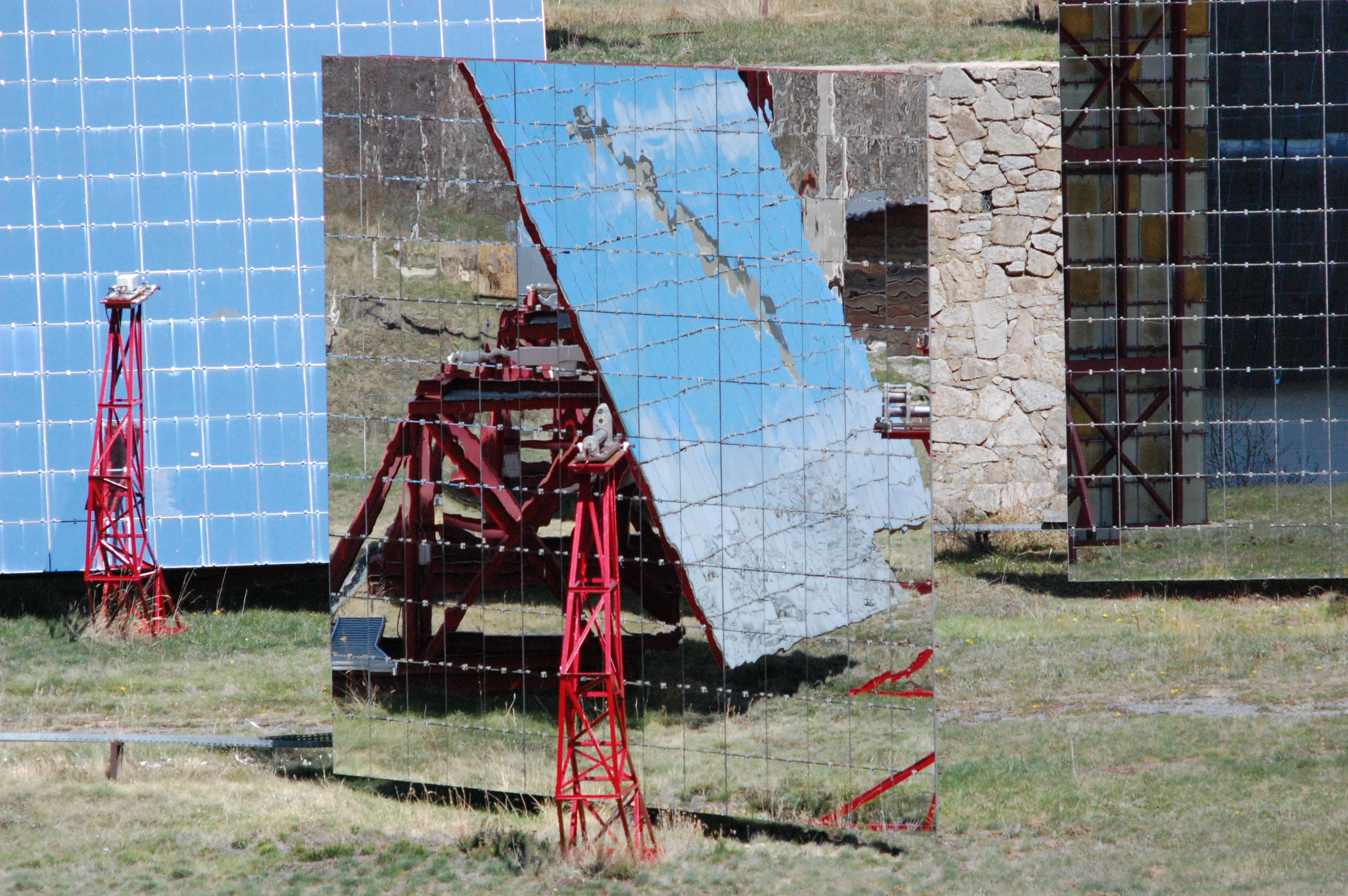
One of the 63 heliostats

The principle used is the concentration of rays by reflecting mirrors (9,600 of them). The solar rays are picked up by a first set of steerable mirrors located on the slope, and then sent to a second series of mirrors (the concentrators), placed in a parabola and eventually converging on a circular target, 40 cm in diameter, on top of the central tower.

Equivalent to concentrating the energy of "10,000 suns", the solar furnace produces a peak power of 1000 kW.

== Advantages ==
- Temperatures above 2,500 °C (4,530 °F) can be obtained in a few seconds.
- The energy is "free", and non-polluting.
- This furnace provides rapid temperature changes and therefore allows studying the effect of thermal shocks.
- There are no contaminating elements (combustion gas, pollution, waste, etc.), since only the object to be examined is heated, and only by solar radiation.

== Uses ==
The research areas are also extended to the aviation and aerospace industries. Experiments can be conducted there in conditions of high chemical purity. The high temperature materials division use the furnace to evaluate radome survival during MIRV warhead earth re-entry along with investigating other material properties under the "high energy thermal radiation environment" frequently produced by "nuclear devices".

== History ==
In 1946 French chemist Felix Trombe and his team achieved in Meudon their first experience of using a DCA (French: Défense Contre Avions = anti-aircraft) mirror. They demonstrated the ability to reach high temperatures very quickly, and in a very pure environment, using highly concentrated sunlight. Their aim was to melt ore and extract highly pure materials for making new and improved refractories.

To achieve this objective and test the various possibilities, a first solar furnace was built at Mont-Louis in 1949. Some years later, on the model of the Mont-Louis furnace and using the results obtained there, a solar furnace of almost industrial size was built at Odeillo. Work on the construction of the Great Solar Oven of Odeillo lasted from 1962 to 1968, and it was commissioned in 1969.

Being strong supporters of solar power, following the first oil shock of 1973, researchers at the Odeillo solar furnace made further progress in the conversion of solar energy into electricity.

== Public information center Héliodyssée ==
From 1990, there was an information center on the site which was open to the public until 2017, and was independent of the CNRS laboratory.

Designed for young and old, Héliodyssée allowed them to learn about solar energy and its derivatives (other forms of renewable energy, and its uses in the home) and the work of researchers from CNRS on energy, environmental, materials for space, and materials of the future.

It appears management changed and the site is no longer open to the public. However, it is still possible to visit the open-air facilities.

=== Bibliography ===
- (in French) G. Olalde et J.L. Peube, « Étude expérimentale d'un récepteur solaire en nid d'abeilles pour le chauffage solaire des gaz à haute température », Revue de Physique Appliquée, no 17, 1982, p. 563-568
- (in French) Bernard Spinner, « La construction d’un pôle de recherche et d’expérimentation solaire », La revue pour l’histoire du CNRS, no 5, 2001
- Base Mérimée: PA66000023, Ministère français de la Culture. (in French)
