= Hermeline Malherbe-Laurent =

French politician

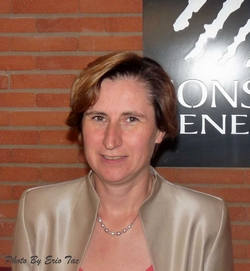

President of the Departmental Council of Pyrénées-Orientales
- Incumbent
- Assumed office November 21, 2010
- Preceded by: Christian Bourquin; Jean-Jacques Lopez (interim)

Departmental councilor of Pyrénées-Orientales
- Incumbent
- Assumed office March 21, 2008
- Constituency: Canton of Perpignan-8 (2008-2015); Canton of Perpignan-6 (2015-2021); Canton of Les Aspres (since 2021)

Senator of the Pyrénées-Orientales
- In office August 27, 2014 – October 1, 2017

Personal details
- Born: February 18, 1969 (age 57) Carvin, Pas-de-Calais
- Party: PS
- Awards: Chevalier de l'ordre national de la Légion d'honneur

Hermeline Malherbe, born Hermeline Laurent on February 18, 1969, in Carvin (Pas-de-Calais), is a French politician. A member of the Socialist Party, she has been president of the departmental council of Pyrénées-Orientales since November 21, 2010, and senator for Pyrénées-Orientales from 2014 to 2017, the day after the death of Christian Bourquin, for whom she was the substitute.

== Biography ==
A former member of the Revolutionary Communist Youth (French: Jeunesses communistes révolutionnaires), she joined Ecology Generation when it was created in 1990. She became a socialist member in 2007 in the Catalan federation of the Socialist Party. She was excluded in 2010 because of her support for Georges Frêche during the regional elections and then reinstated in November 2011.

Hermeline Malherbe was elected for the first time, in Seine-et-Marne in 2001 as the municipal councilor of Meaux.

Arriving in 2005 in Pyrénées-Orientales, she was elected general councilor from the canton of Perpignan-8 in 2008. She chaired the commission for sustainable development and access for people with disabilities at the General Council.

She was elected regional councilor in 2010 and became vice-president of the Languedoc-Roussillon region. In November 2010, she was elected president of the general council of Pyrénées-Orientales, following the resignation of Christian Bourquin, and was elected president of the Languedoc-Roussillon region after the death of Georges Frêche.

Substitute for Christian Bourquin during the 2011 senatorial elections, she succeeded him in the Senate after his death on August 26, 2014, and chose the group of the Social and European Democratic Rally (RDSE). During the discussion on the bill on the delimitation of the regions, she defended the separation of the Languedoc-Roussillon and Midi-Pyrénées regions in the Senate.

In March 2015, she was elected departmental councilor from the canton of Perpignan-6 in tandem with Jean Roque. On April 2, she was elected to the presidency of the department.

She spoke out against plain cigarette packs during debates in the Senate on the health system modernization law on September 16, 2015, against the advice of the government.

She ran in the 2017 senatorial elections, unsuccessfully. The candidate of Les Républicains François Calvet was elected senator for the department of Pyrénées-Orientales in the first round, and a second LR candidate, Jean Sol, won in the second round.

Hermeline Malherbe was elevated to the rank of Knight of the National Order of the Legion of Honour during the 2020 New Year's promotion.

In January 2022, she confirmed the 'Oui au Pays Catalan' organisation, who launched a petition for a name change in 2017, a referendum by the end of the year to choose the new name of the department of Pyrénées-Orientales.
