= Heliostat =

Solar tracking device

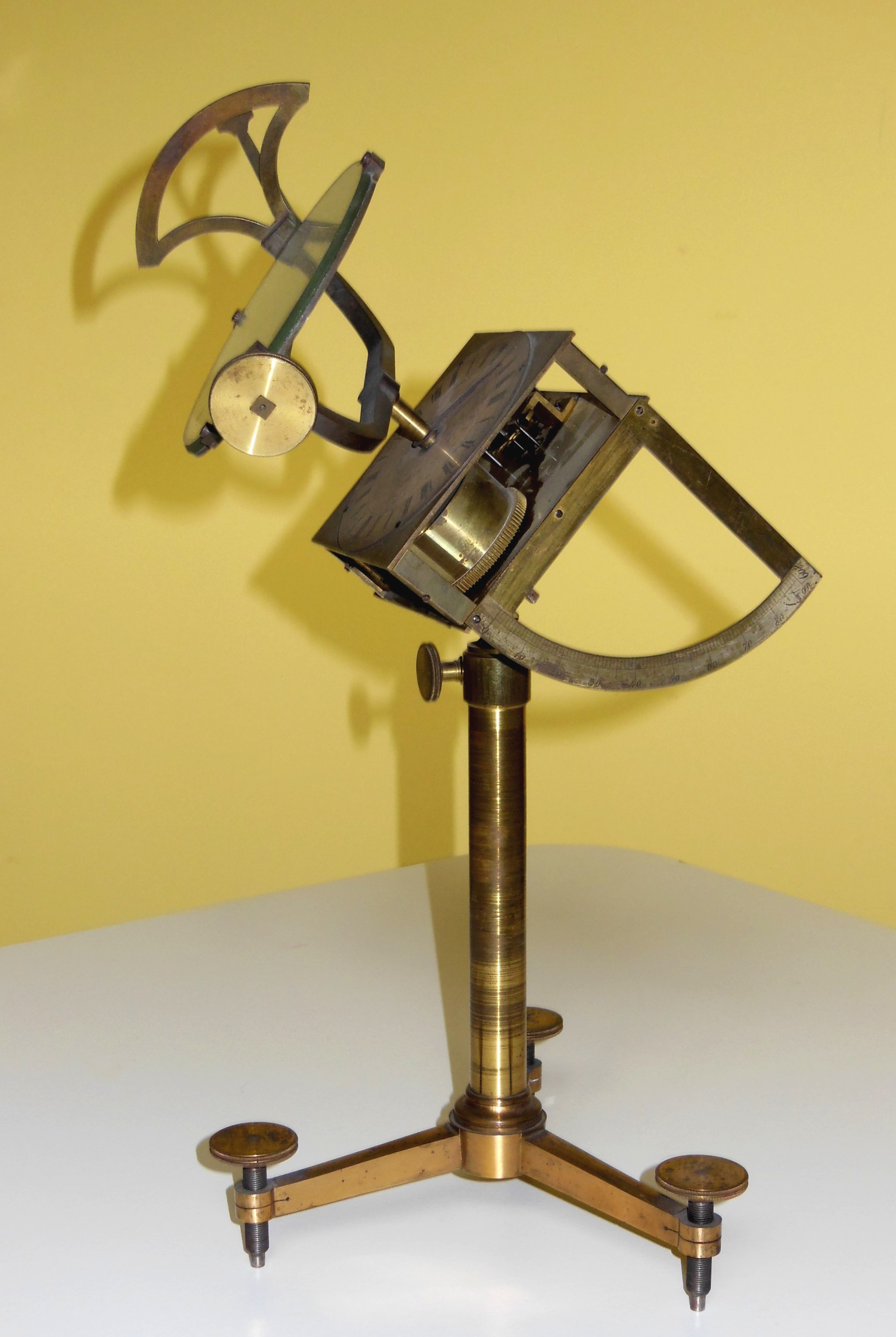
Heliostat by the Viennese instrument maker Ekling (c. 1850)

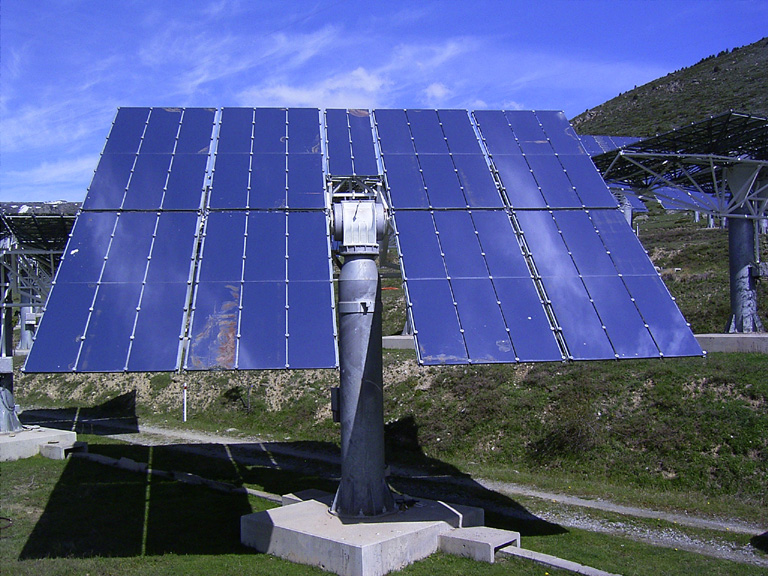
A heliostat at the THÉMIS experimental station in France. The mirror rotates on an altazimuth mount.

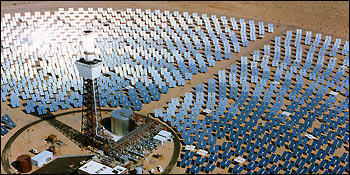
The Solar Two solar-thermal power project near Daggett, California. Every mirror in the field of heliostats reflects sunlight continuously onto the receiver on the tower.

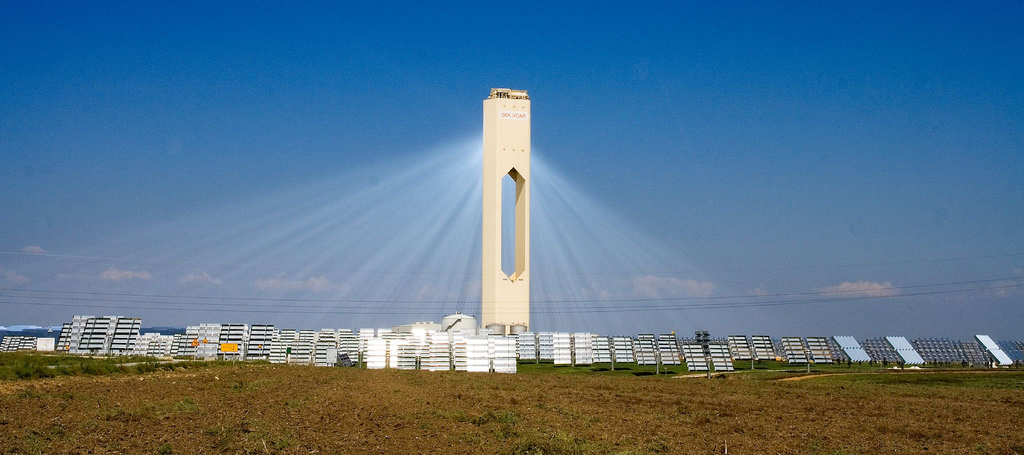
The 11MW PS10 near Seville in Spain. When this picture was taken, dust in the air made the converging light visible.

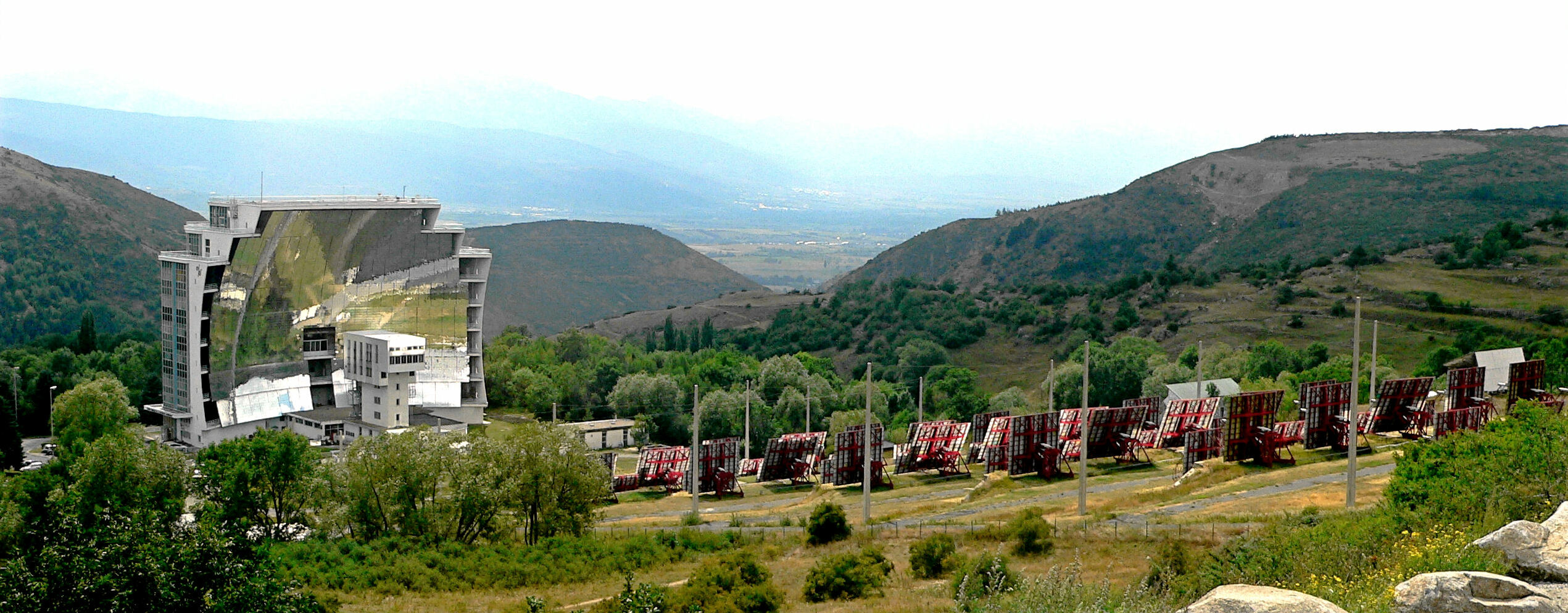
The solar furnace at Odeillo in the Pyrenees-Orientales in France can reach temperatures up to 3,500 °C (6,330 °F)

A heliostat (from Ancient Greek ἥλιος (hḗlios) 'sun' and στατός (statós) 'standing') is a device that reflects sunlight toward a target, turning to compensate for the Sun's apparent motion. The reflector is usually a plane mirror.

The target may be a physical object, distant from the heliostat, or a direction in space. To do this, the reflective surface of the mirror is kept perpendicular to the bisector of the angle between the directions of the Sun and the target as seen from the mirror. In almost every case, the target is stationary relative to the heliostat, so the light is reflected in a fixed direction. According to contemporary sources the heliostata, as it was called at first, was invented by Willem 's Gravesande (1688–1742). Other contenders are Giovanni Alfonso Borelli (1608–1679) and Daniel Gabriel Fahrenheit (1686–1736). A heliostat designed by George Johnstone Storey is in the Science Museum Group collection.

Currently, most heliostats are used for daylighting or for the production of concentrated solar power, usually to generate electricity. They are also sometimes used in solar cooking. A few are used experimentally to reflect motionless beams of sunlight into solar telescopes. Before the availability of lasers and other electric lights, heliostats were widely used to produce intense, stationary beams of light for scientific and other purposes.

Most modern heliostats are controlled by computers. The computer is given the latitude and longitude of the heliostat's position on the Earth and the time and date. From these, using astronomical theory, it calculates the direction of the Sun as seen from the mirror, e.g. its compass bearing and angle of elevation. Then, given the direction of the target, the computer calculates the direction of the required angle-bisector, and sends control signals to motors, often stepper motors, so they turn the mirror to the correct alignment. This sequence of operations is repeated frequently to keep the mirror properly oriented.

Large installations such as solar-thermal power stations include fields of heliostats comprising many mirrors. Usually, all the mirrors in such a field are controlled by a single computer.

There are older types of heliostat which do not use computers, including ones that are partly or wholly operated by hand or by clockwork, or are controlled by light-sensors. These are now quite rare.

Heliostats should be distinguished from solar trackers or sun-trackers that point directly at the sun in the sky. However, some older types of heliostat incorporate solar trackers, together with additional components to bisect the sun-mirror-target angle.

A siderostat is a similar device which is designed to follow a fainter star, rather than the Sun.

== Large-scale projects ==
In a solar-thermal power plant, like those of The Solar Project or the PS10 plant in Spain, a wide field of heliostats focuses the Sun's power onto a single collector to heat a medium such as water or molten salt. The medium travels through a heat exchanger to heat water, produce steam, and then generate electricity through a steam turbine.

A somewhat different arrangement of heliostats in a field is used at experimental solar furnaces, such as the one at Odeillo, in France. All the heliostat mirrors send accurately parallel beams of light into a large paraboloidal reflector which brings them to a precise focus. The mirrors have to be located close enough to the axis of the paraboloid to reflect sunlight into it along lines parallel to the axis, so the field of heliostats has to be narrow. A closed loop control system is used. Sensors determine if any of the heliostats is slightly misaligned. If so, they send signals to correct it.

It has been proposed that the high temperatures generated could be used to split water producing hydrogen sustainably.

== Small-scale projects ==
Smaller heliostats are used for daylighting and heating. Instead of many large heliostats focusing on a single target to concentrate solar power (as in a solar power tower plant), a single heliostat usually about 1 or 2 square meters in size reflects non-concentrated sunlight through a window or skylight. A small heliostat, installed outside on the ground or on a building structure like a roof, moves on two axes (up/down and left/right) in order to compensate for the constant movement of the Sun. In this way, the reflected sunlight stays fixed on the target (e.g. window).

Genzyme Center, corporate headquarters of Genzyme Corp. in Cambridge, Massachusetts, uses heliostats on the roof to direct sunlight into its12-story atrium.

In a 2009 article, Bruce Rohr suggested that small heliostats could be used like a solar power tower system. Instead of occupying hundreds of acres, the system would fit in a much smaller area, like the flat rooftop of a commercial building, he said. The proposed system would use the power in sunlight to heat and cool a building or to provide input for thermal industrial processes like processing food. The cooling would be performed with an absorption chiller. Rohr proposed that the system would be "more reliable and more cost-effective per square meter of reflective area" than large solar power tower plants, in part because it would not be sacrificing 80 percent of the power collected in the process of converting it to electricity.

== Design ==
Heliostat costs represent 30-50% of the initial capital investment for solar power tower power plants depending on the energy policy and economic framework in the location country. It is of interest to design less expensive heliostats for large-scale manufacturing, so that solar power tower power plants may produce electricity at costs more competitive to conventional coal or nuclear power plants costs.

Besides cost, percent solar reflectivity (i.e. albedo) and environmental durability are factors that should be considered when comparing heliostat designs.

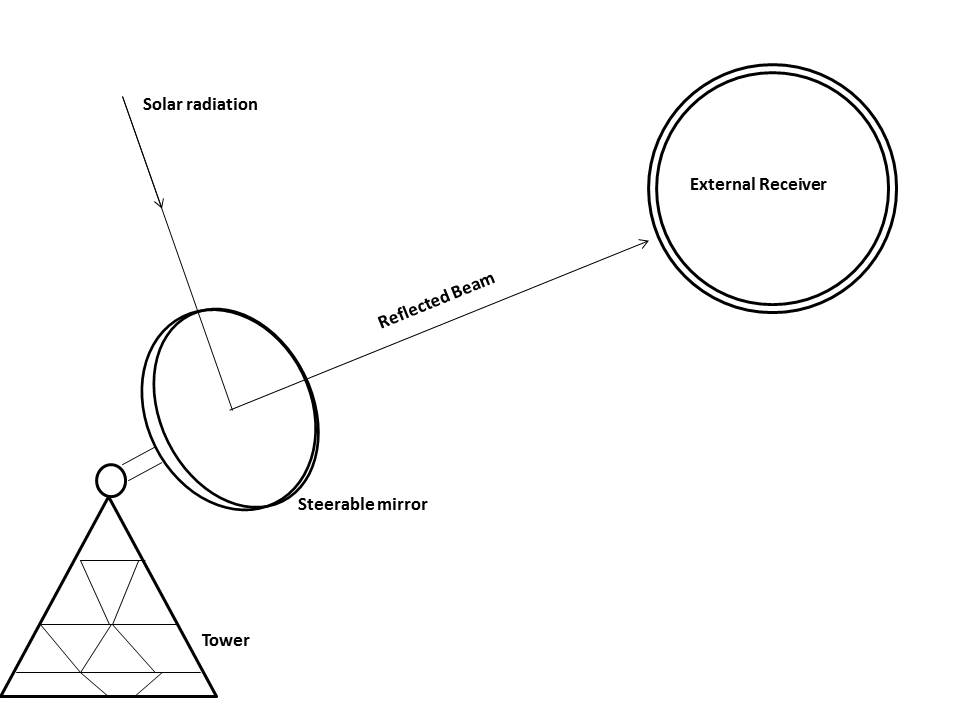

One way that engineers and researchers are attempting to lower the costs of heliostats is by replacing the conventional heliostat design with one that uses fewer, lighter materials. A conventional design for the heliostat's reflective components utilizes a second surface mirror. The sandwich-like mirror structure generally consists of a steel structural support, an adhesive layer, a protective copper layer, a layer of reflective silver, and a top protective layer of thick glass. This conventional heliostat is often referred to as a glass/metal heliostat. Alternative designs incorporate recent adhesive, composite, and thin film research to bring about materials costs and weight reduction. Some examples of alternative reflector designs are silvered polymer reflectors, glass fiber reinforced polyester sandwiches (GFRPS), and aluminized reflectors. Problems with these more recent designs include delamination of the protective coatings, reduction in percent solar reflectivity over long periods of sun exposure, and high manufacturing costs.

== Tracking alternatives ==
The movement of most modern heliostats employs a two-axis motorized system, controlled by computer as outlined at the start of this article. Almost always, the primary rotation axis is vertical and the secondary horizontal, so the mirror is on an alt-azimuth mount.

One simple alternative is for the mirror to rotate around a polar aligned primary axis, driven by a mechanical, often clockwork, mechanism at 15 degrees per hour, compensating for the Earth's rotation relative to the Sun. The mirror is aligned to reflect sunlight along the same polar axis in the direction of one of the celestial poles. There is a perpendicular secondary axis allowing occasional manual adjustment of the mirror (daily or less often as necessary) to compensate for the shift in the Sun's declination with the seasons. The setting of the drive clock can also be occasionally adjusted to compensate for changes in the Equation of Time. The target can be located on the same polar axis that is the mirror's primary rotation axis, or a second, stationary mirror can be used to reflect light from the polar axis toward the target, wherever that might be. This kind of mirror mount and drive is often used with solar cookers, such as Scheffler reflectors. For this application, the mirror can be concave, so as to concentrate sunlight onto the cooking vessel.

The alt-azimuth and polar-axis alignments are two of the three orientations for two-axis mounts that are, or have been, commonly used for heliostat mirrors. The third is the target-axis arrangement in which the primary axis points toward the target at which sunlight is to be reflected. The secondary axis is perpendicular to the primary one. Heliostats controlled by light-sensors have used this orientation. A small arm carries sensors that control motors that turn the arm around the two axes, so it points toward the sun, incorporating a solar tracker. A simple mechanical arrangement bisects the angle between the primary axis, pointing to the target, and the arm, pointing to the Sun. The mirror is mounted so its reflective surface is perpendicular to this bisector. This type of heliostat was used for daylighting prior to the availability of cheap computers, but after the initial availability of sensor control hardware.

There are heliostat designs which do not require the rotation axes to have any exact orientation. For example, there may be light-sensors close to the target which send signals to motors so that they correct the alignment of the mirror whenever the beam of reflected light drifts away from the target. The directions of the axes need be only approximately known, since the system is intrinsically self-correcting. However, there are disadvantages, such as that the mirror has to be manually realigned every morning and after any prolonged cloudy spell, since the reflected beam, when it reappears, misses the sensors, so the system cannot correct the orientation of the mirror. There are also geometrical problems which limit the functioning of the heliostat when the directions of the Sun and the target, as seen from the mirror, are very different. Because of the disadvantages, this design has never been commonly used, but some people do experiment with it.

Typically, the heliostat mirror moves at a rate that is 1/2 the angular motion of the Sun. There is another arrangement that satisfies the definition of a heliostat yet has a mirror motion that is 2/3rd of the motion of the Sun.

Many other types of heliostat have also occasionally been used. In the very earliest heliostats, for example, which were used for daylighting in ancient Egypt, servants or slaves kept the mirrors aligned manually, without using any kind of mechanism. (There are places in Egypt where this is done today, for the benefit of tourists. In the 1997 film The Fifth Element an Egyptian boy holds a mirror to illuminate a wall inside a cave for a fictional archaeologist.) Elaborate clockwork heliostats were made during the 19th Century which could reflect sunlight to a target in any direction using only a single mirror, minimizing light losses, and which automatically compensated for the Sun's seasonal movements. Some of these devices are still to be seen in museums, but they are not used for practical purposes today. Amateurs sometimes come up with ad hoc designs which work approximately, in some particular location, without any theoretical justification. An essentially limitless number of such designs are possible.

== See also ==
- Heliograph, a similar non-tracking device, used for communication
- Renewable energy
- Rjukan, a town in Norway that uses a heliostat to illuminate a portion of the town square during winter months
- Solar cell
- Solar cooker
- Solar energy
- Solar thermal energy
- Solar tracker
