= Arboretum de Font-Romeu =

Arboretum in Pyrénées-Orientales, Languedoc-Roussillon, France

Coordinates: 42°30′21″N 2°02′20″E

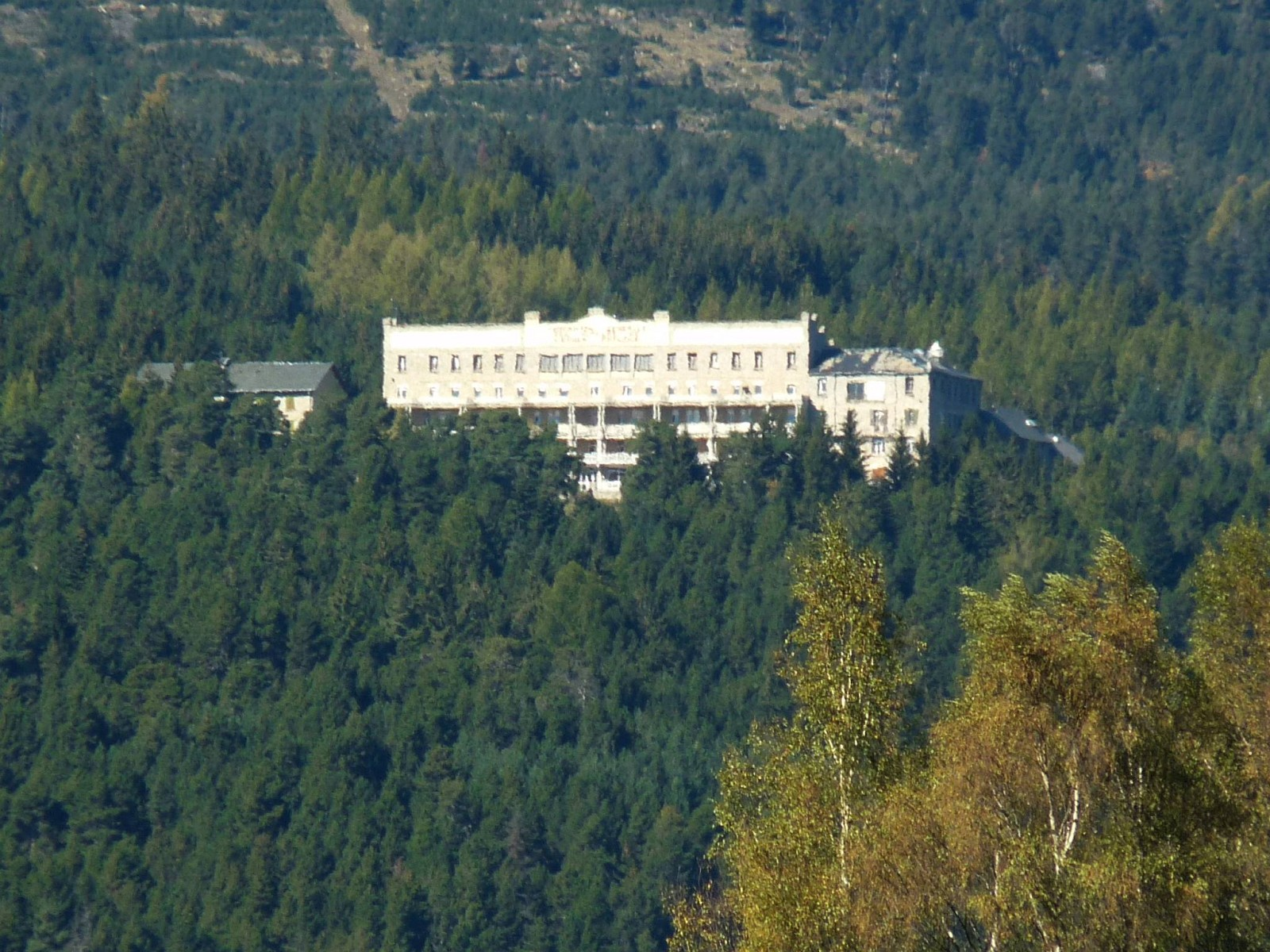
Balcon de Cerdagne, Font-Romeu, Pyrénées-Orientales, France, 2009.

The Arboretum de Font-Romeu (9 hectares) is an arboretum located at an altitude of 1800 metres within the Forêt de Font-Romeu near Font-Romeu-Odeillo-Via, Pyrénées-Orientales, Languedoc-Roussillon, France. It was established in 1938 and is managed by the Office National des Forêts.

== See also ==
- List of botanical gardens in France
