= Font-Romeu-Odeillo-Via =

- Commune
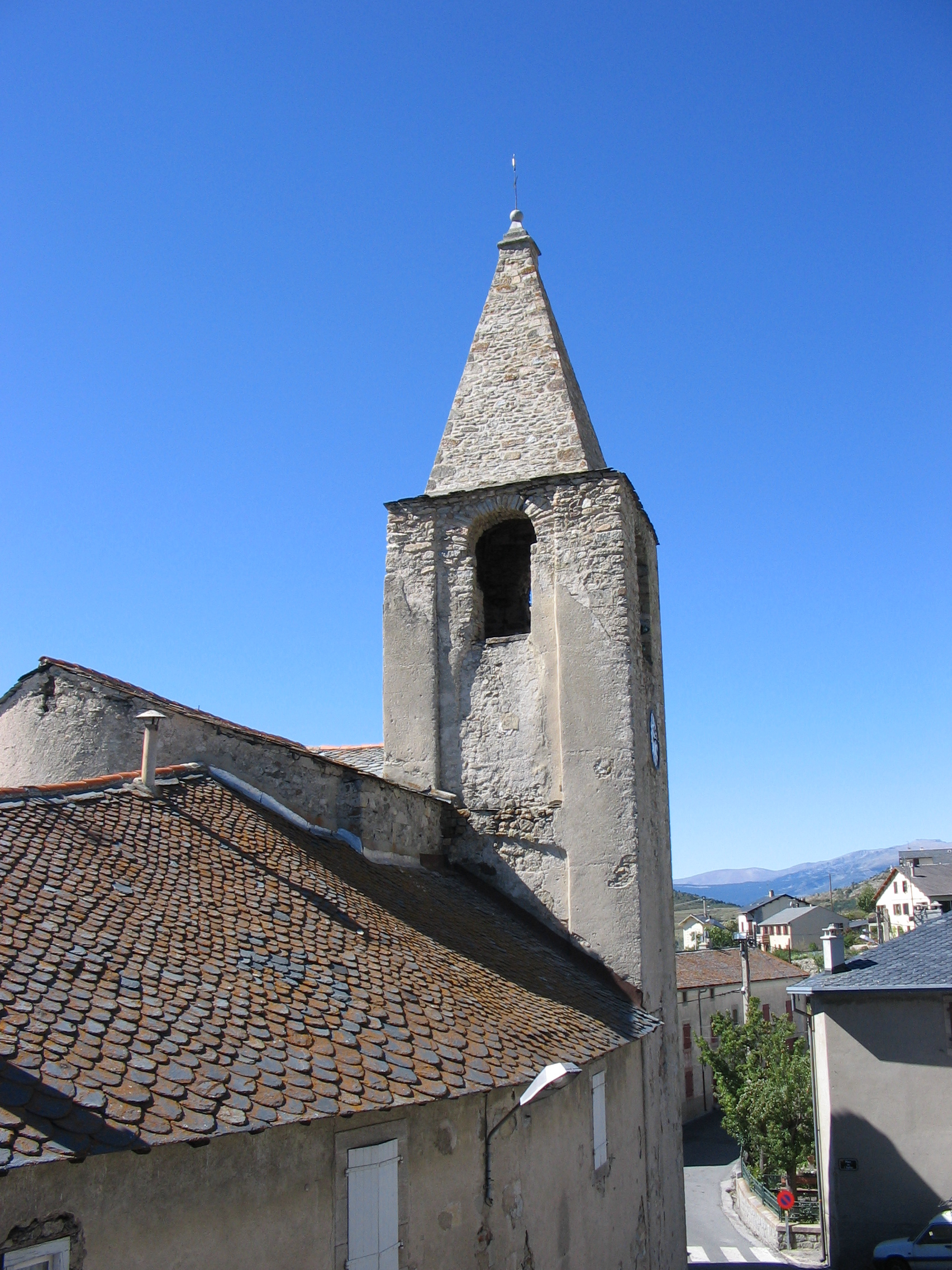
- Church of St. Martin in Odeillo

- Coat of arms
- Location of Font-Romeu-Odeillo-Via
- Location within France Location within Occitanie
- Coordinates: 42°29′54″N 2°02′05″E
- Country: France
- Region: Occitania
- Department: Pyrénées-Orientales
- Arrondissement: Prades
- Canton: Les Pyrénées catalanes

Government
  - Mayor (2020–2026): Alain Luneau
- Area^{1}: 29.60 km^{2} (11.43 sq mi)
- Elevation: 1,800 m (5,900 ft)
- Highest elevation: 2,212 m (7,257 ft)
- Lowest elevation: 1,312 m (4,304 ft)
- Population (2023): 1,762
  - Density: 59.53/km^{2} (154.2/sq mi)
- Time zone: UTC+01:00 (CET)
  - Summer (DST): UTC+02:00 (CEST)
- INSEE/Postal code: 66124 /66120
- ^{1} French Land Register data, which excludes lakes, ponds, glaciers > 1 km^{2} (0.386 sq mi or 247 acres) and river estuaries.

Font-Romeu-Odeillo-Via (French pronunciation: [fɔ̃ ʁɔmø ɔdɛjo vja]; Catalan: Font-romeu, Odelló i Vià), or simply Odeillo, is a commune in the Pyrénées-Orientales and Cerdagne near the Spanish border in the south of France. It comprises the villages of Odeillo and Via, as well as Font-Romeu, one of the oldest ski resorts in France and the oldest in the Pyrenees.

== Geography ==
=== Localization ===
Font-Romeu-Odeillo-Via is located in the canton of Les Pyrénées catalanes and in the arrondissement of Prades. It is bordered by the communes of Angoustrine-Villeneuve-des-Escaldes, Targasonne, Égat, Estavar, Saillagouse, Eyne and Bolquère.

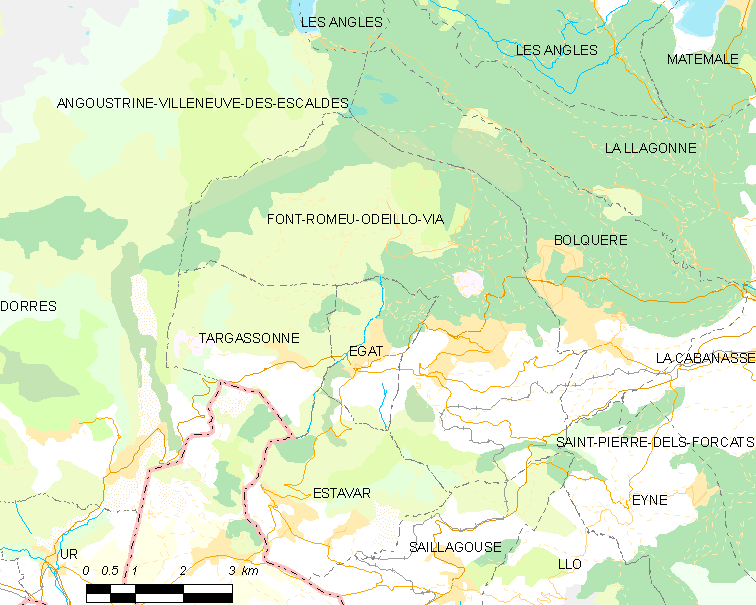
Map of Font-Romeu-Odeillo-Via and its surrounding communes

=== Transportation ===
Font-Romeu-Odeillo-Via station is served by the Yellow Train line, a railway which runs from Villefranche-de-Conflent to Latour-de-Carol.

== Toponymy ==
The names of Odeillo and Via appear in 839 as parrochia Hodellone et parrochia Avizano.

The name Font-Romeu means in Catalan "fountain of the pilgrim".

== History ==
Odeillo and Via were both mentioned for the first time in 839 among the places paying a fee to La Seu d'Urgell church. Nevertheless, Odeillo was at the time part of the County of Cerdanya, while Via was a property of the Urg family.

On 15 July 1035, Wifred II, Count of Cerdanya, gave Odeillo to the Abbey of Saint-Martin-du-Canigou, where he retired himself a short time before his death. The Abbey of Saint-Michel-de-Cuxa also owned a few allods in Odeillo, as recognized by a papal bull from Sergius IV in 1011.

Via remained a property of the Urg family until the 13th century. It was then bought by Peter of Fenouillet, viscount of Fenouillet and then viscount of Ille.

A chapel was mentioned for the first time in Font-Romeu in 1525, on the territory of Odeillo. It already hosted a statue of the Virgin Mary from the 13th century, and a hermitage was built from 1693 to receive the pilgrims.

Odeillo and Via both became communes in 1790. The commune of Via was abolished and included into Odeillo on 10 July 1822.

In 1881, a wildfire caused by arson spread throughout 267 hectares of the forest of La Calme in the north of the commune.

== Demography ==
Historical population
Year	Pop.	±% p.a.
1968	1,857	—
1975	2,098	+1.76%
1982	2,150	+0.35%
1990	1,857	−1.81%
1999	2,003	+0.84%
2007	1,992	−0.07%
2012	1,843	−1.54%
2017	1,928	+0.91%
2023	1,762	−1.49%
Source: INSEE

== Solar power ==
- The world's largest solar furnace in Odeillo can reach temperatures of 3,500 °C (6,330 °F).
- THEMIS Solar Power R&D center is 3 km (1.9 mi) away in the village of Targasonne.

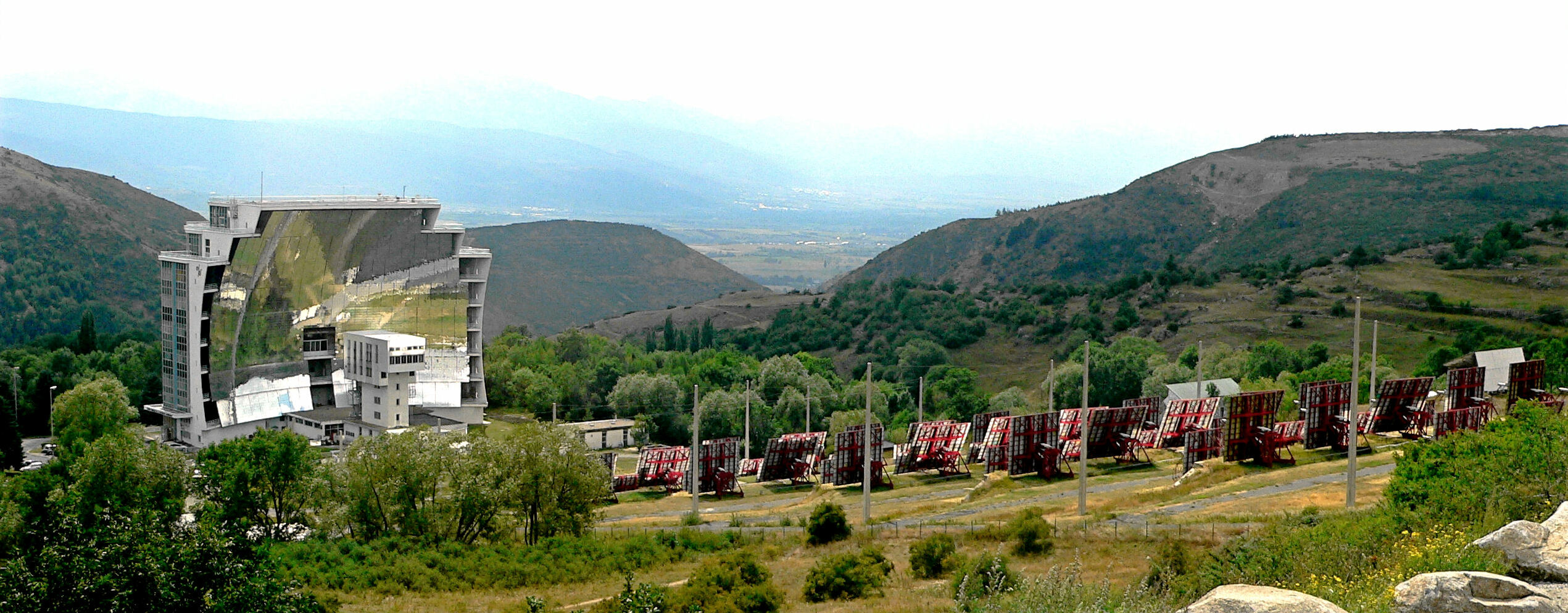
The solar furnace at Odeillo

== See also ==
- Arboretum de Font-Romeu
- Communes of the Pyrénées-Orientales department
