= Pedro Étienne Solère =

French composer, music teacher, and clarinetist

Pedro Étienne Solère (4 April 1753 – 1817) was a French composer, teacher of music and clarinetist.

== Biography ==
Born in Mont-Louis, Solère began playing clarinet as a child. He was very talented and already at the age of 14, he joined the Champagne infantry regiment orchestra. To complete his professional skills, he studied in Paris with Michel Yost. In 1784, he performed at the Concert Spirituel. He was noticed by the Duke Louis Philippe I, Duke of Orléans, who hired him.

He toured in Italy, Spain and Russia, and gained international renown. After the Duke's death, Solère became first clarinet in the French King's orchestra. Thanks to his reputation, he was recruited as a professor at the Conservatoire de Paris, founded in 1795. His friendship with François Devienne greatly influenced his creative work.

His compositions are mainly known today for his works for clarinet.

== Compositions ==
=== Works for orchestra ===
- Concerto in E♭ major, for clarinet and orchestra
- Concerto in E♭ major, for two clarinets and orchestra
- Spanish Concerto in B♭ major, for clarinet and orchestra
- Concert Symphonies Nos. 1 and 2, for two clarinets and orchestra

=== Chamber music ===
- 2 Duos for two clarinets
- 3 Fantasies for clarinet and piano
