= Cherenkov Array at Themis =

Gamma-ray telescope in France

The Cherenkov Array at Themis (CAT) was an imaging atmospheric Cherenkov telescope (IACT) for detection of very-high-energy gamma rays (~200 GeV to a few tens of TeV). The project started operation in Autumn 1996 on the site of the former solar plant Thémis, France.
