= Departmental Council of Pyrénées-Orientales =

The Departmental Council of Pyrénées-Orientales (French: Conseil départemental des Pyrénées-Orientales; Catalan: Consell Departamental dels Pirineus Orientals) is the deliberative assembly of the Pyrénées-Orientales department in the Occitanie region in Southern France. Its 34 conseillers départementaux are elected every 6 years. Each of the 17 cantons of Pyrénées-Orientales provides two members of this assembly, a woman and a man elected together.

== Organisation ==
=== President ===
The current President of Departmental Council of Pyrénées-Orientales (Président du conseil départemental des Pyrénées-Orientales) is Hermeline Malherbe-Laurent of the Socialist Party (PS), who succeeded Christian Bourquin (PS) on 21 November 2010 after a short interim by Jean-Jacques Lopez.

==== Former presidents ====
Map of cantons (before 2015)

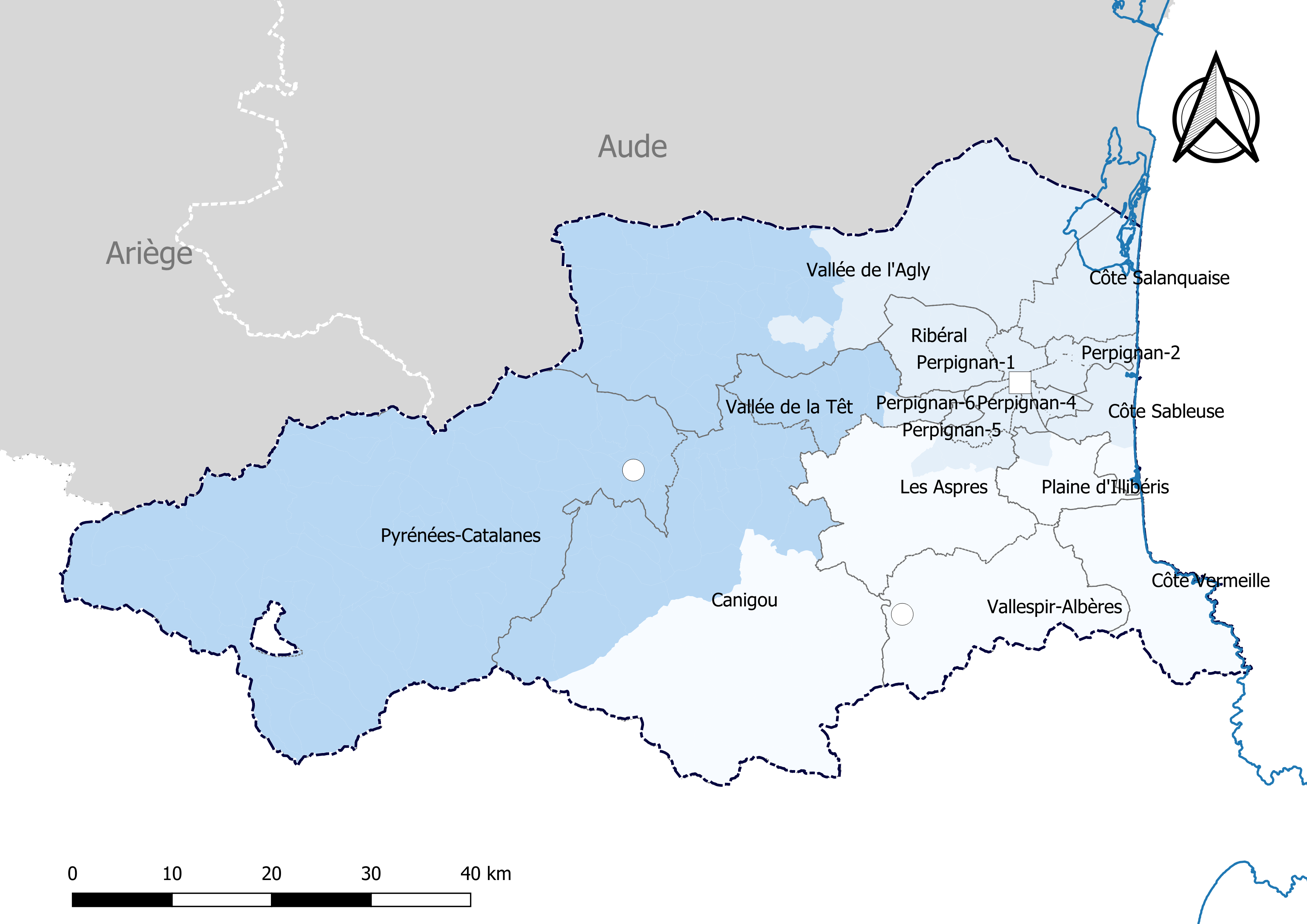
Map of cantons (since 2015)

- Louis Noguères (SFIO), 1945–1956
- Jean Jacquet (SFIO then PS), 1956–1973
- Léon-Jean Grégory (PS then Independent), 1973–1982
- Guy Malé (UDF), 1982–1987
- René Marquès (UDF), 1987–1998
- Christian Bourquin (PS), 1998–2010

=== The vice-presidents (2021–2028) ===
- 1st: Nicolas Garcia (PCF)
- 2nd: Toussainte Calabrèse (PS)
- 3rd: Robert Garrabé (PS)
- 4th: Françoise Fiter (PCF)
- 5th: Jean Roque (PS)
- 6th: Marie-Pierre Sadourny (PS)
- 7th: Alexandre Reynal (PS)
- 8th: Madeleine Garcia-Vidal (DVG)
- 9th: Rémi Lacapère (PCF)
- 10th: Aude Vivès (DVG)

=== The Council ===
The assembly sets departmental policy. The departmental council has 34 conseillers départementaux for the 17 cantons of Pyrénées-Orientales including the president. The conseiller départemental is a representative, elected by universal suffrage for six years.

== The powers of the Council ==
Departmental councils exercise the powers given by the laws of decentralisation in the social welfare domain, the roads and water network, education, fire and rescue services, economic development, public museums, departmental archives, and the management of protected areas.

=== Social welfare ===
- The Revenu de solidarité active or RSA replaced in 2009 the Revenu minimum d'insertion or RMI, the "Allocation de parent isolé" (API) to help single parents, the "Prime pour l'emploi" (PPE), an allocation to help the working poor.
- The Office of Public Housing of Pyrénées-Orientales

=== Roads and public transport ===
- The 1 € bus network
- The management of the road network in the Pyrénées-Orientales

=== Education and sport ===
- The management of school canteens and 30 collèges of Pyrénées-Orientales
- Two bibliobus that crisscross the department
- The Médiathèque départementale Claude Simon.
- The 40 "sports departmental committees", and the Sports Health Center.
- Financial support for the USAP, and Catalans Dragons

=== Economic development ===
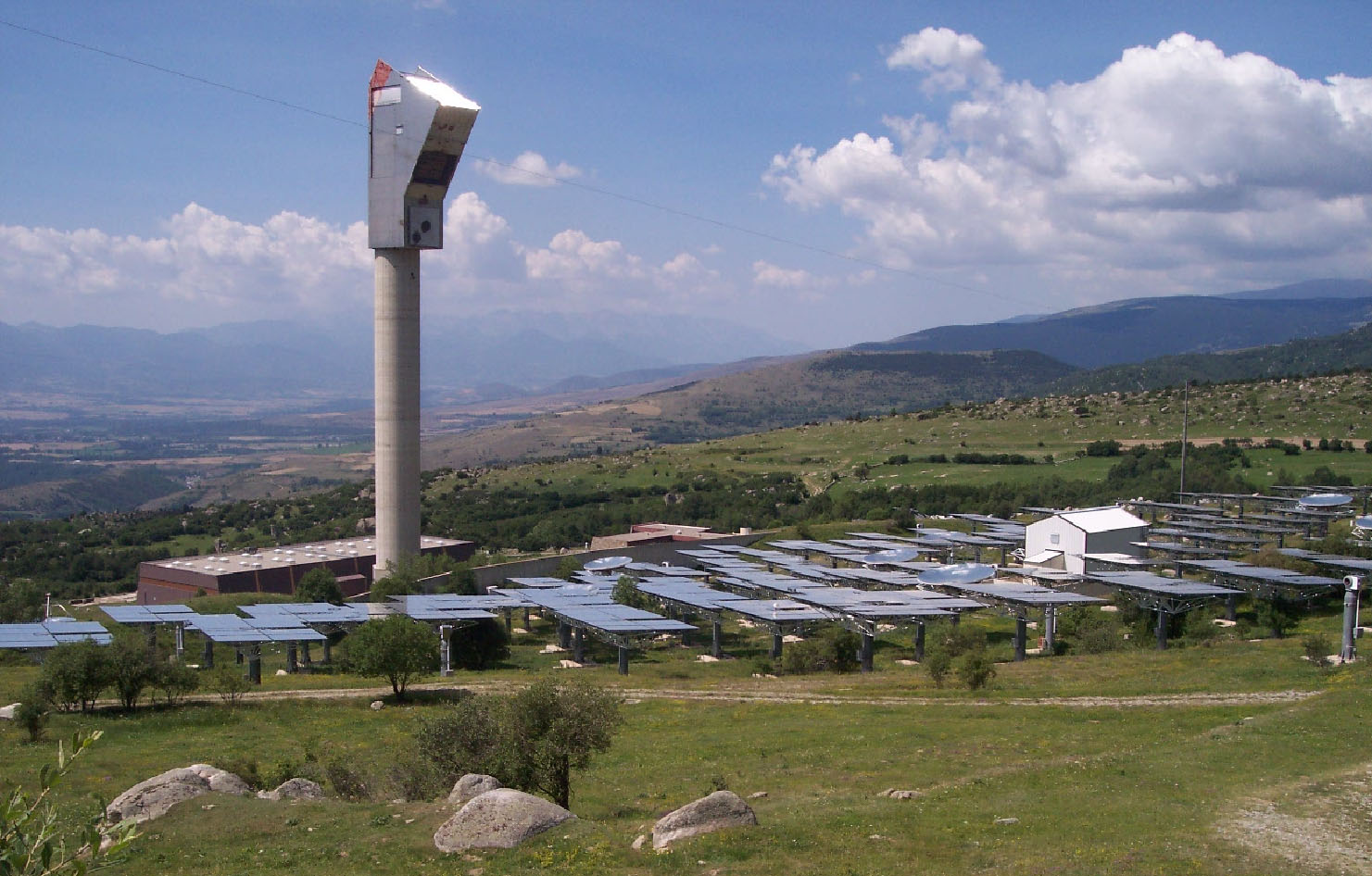
The THEMIS Solar Power tower

- The "Platform Multimodale Pyrenees Mediterranean"
- The departmental committee of tourism
- The THEMIS solar power plant

=== Culture and heritage of Pyrénées-Orientales ===
- Partner of Musée d'Art Moderne de Céret the art museum of Céret,
- The Palace of the Kings of Majorca
- The Château Royal de Collioure
- The Serrabone Priory
- Participation in the cultural network "Réseau culturel Terre Catalane".

=== Environmental protection and sustainable development ===
- Partner of the Parc naturel régional des Pyrénées Catalanes
- Partner of "syndicat mixte grand Site Canigó" that manages the Canigó range
- management of Paulilles protected area

- The Regional Natural Reserve of Nyer
- The Natural Marine Reserve of Banyuls-Cerbère

== The Eurodistrict ==
The General Council has a policy of cooperation with the Generalitat of Catalonia, the Province of Girona and Andorra to create a Catalan Eurodistrict.

On July 27, 2007, the signature of the framework agreement took place in Céret for launching the Eurodistrict project. Establishment of a Common Fund to support projects of cooperation across the Catalan space, and common development of cross-border projects, the General Council and the Casa de la Generalitat de Catalunya in Perpignan.

== Catalan language ==
A study in 1997 found that 55% of the population understand, 39% can read and 34% can speak Catalan. It found a higher percentage of speakers in villages and lower in the capital city. Although Catalan has no official status, it was first recognised in 1951 when it was introduced into the school curriculum. The Region of Languedoc-Roussillon created an agency for the promotion of the two regional languages, Catalan and Occitan.

At the session of 10 December 2007, the General Council approved the "Charter for Catalan" in which the Pyrénées-Orientales is committed to ensuring the promotion, development and dissemination of the Catalan language and the Catalan culture. It says in the Preamble: "Catalan, is born more than a thousand years, is one of the pillars of our identity, heritage and richness of the department of Pyrénées-Orientales (Northern Catalonia). The term Northern Catalonia gets its first official recognition here.

== Automatic defibrillators ==
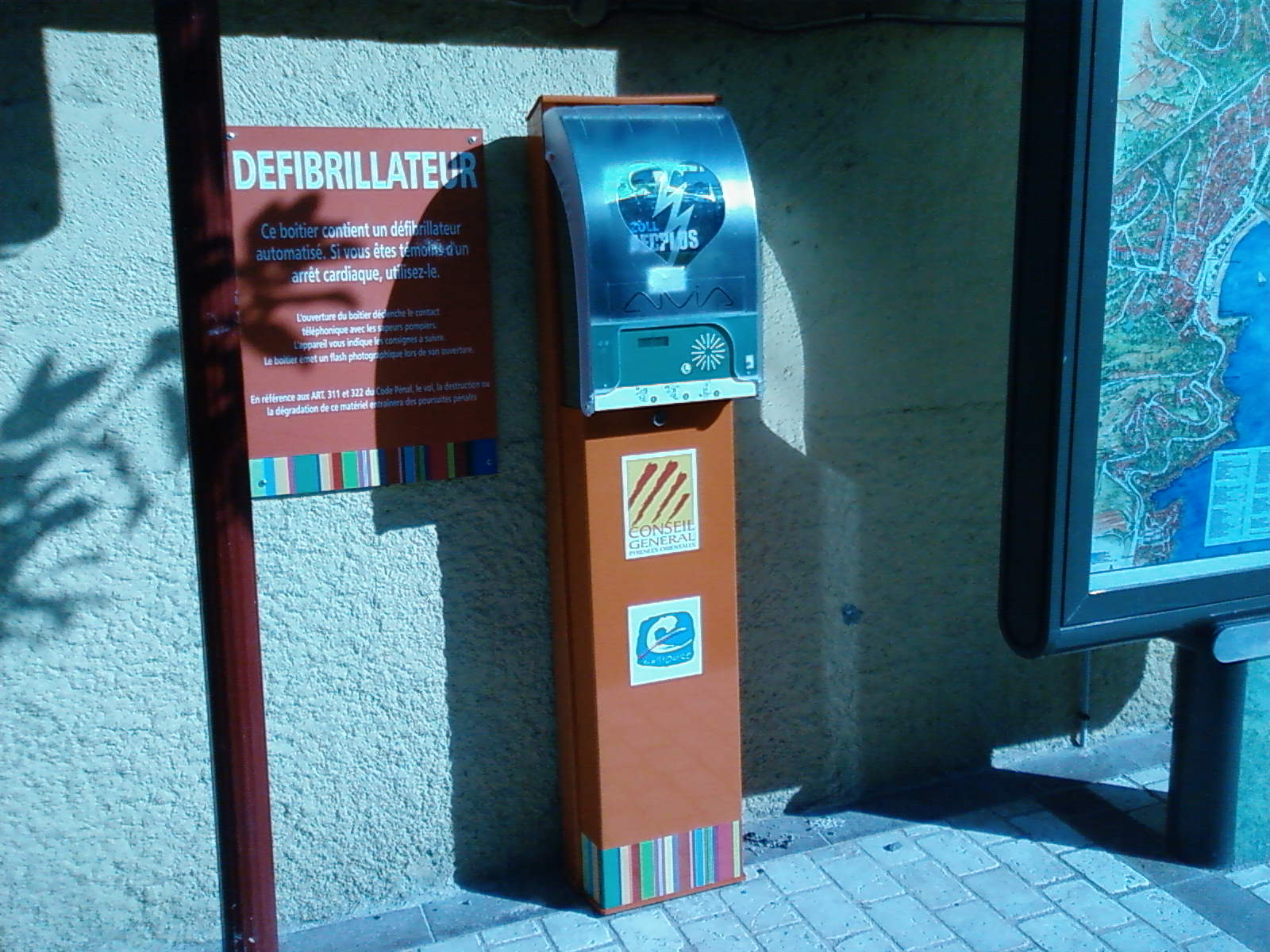
Defibrillator of General Council on the city hall of Collioure

The Pyrénées-Orientales is conducting a pilot study of installation of automatic defibrillators. On April 2, 2007, the General Council first decided to purchase defibrillators for 22 municipalities located more than 20 minutes from emergency medical services. Since March 2008, when a defibrillator was installed in Mosset, 141 municipalities have had them, the objective being to equip all 226 municipalities and the 22 General Council buildings. Certain municipalities have also decided to install additional defibrillators at highly frequented locations.

After a presentation to the French Council of Mayors, other French departments and regions are also considering the installation of automatic defibrillators.

The devices require a telephone line and an ADSL connection, and their ground support equipment makes use of GPS. Thus, their installation also helps to reduce the digital divide in formerly poorly connected villages.
