= Ganties =

- Commune
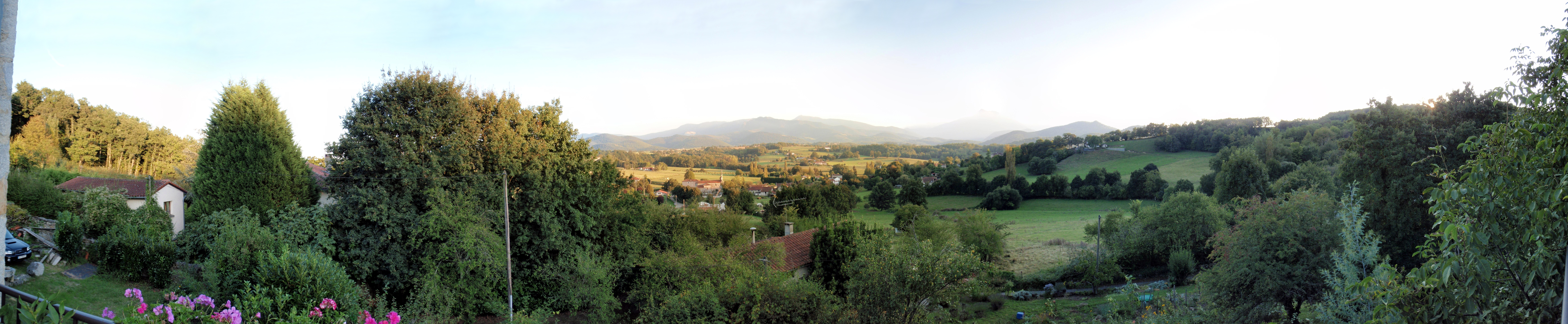
- A general view of Ganties
- Location of Ganties
- Location within France Location within Occitanie
- Coordinates: 43°03′56″N 0°49′55″E
- Country: France
- Region: Occitania
- Department: Haute-Garonne
- Arrondissement: Saint-Gaudens
- Canton: Bagnères-de-Luchon

Government
  - Mayor (2020–2026): Jeannine Rey
- Area^{1}: 12.03 km^{2} (4.64 sq mi)
- Elevation: 420 m (1,380 ft)
- Highest elevation: 501 m (1,644 ft)
- Lowest elevation: 355 m (1,165 ft)
- Population (2023): 302
  - Density: 25.1/km^{2} (65.0/sq mi)
- Time zone: UTC+01:00 (CET)
  - Summer (DST): UTC+02:00 (CEST)
- INSEE/Postal code: 31208 /31160
- ^{1} French Land Register data, which excludes lakes, ponds, glaciers > 1 km^{2} (0.386 sq mi or 247 acres) and river estuaries.

Ganties (French pronunciation: [ɡɑ̃ti]; Occitan: Gantias) is a commune in the Haute-Garonne department in southwestern France.

== Population ==
Historical population
Year	Pop.	±% p.a.
1968	271	—
1975	252	−1.03%
1982	255	+0.17%
1990	247	−0.40%
1999	244	−0.14%
2007	291	+2.23%
2012	305	+0.94%
2017	327	+1.40%
2023	302	−1.32%
Source: INSEE

== See also ==
- Communes of the Haute-Garonne department
