= Canton of Perpignan-8 =

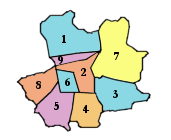
Cantons of Perpignan

The Canton of Perpignan-8 is a French former canton of Pyrénées-Orientales department, in Languedoc-Roussillon. It was created 25 January 1982 by the decree 82–84. It had 13,589 inhabitants (2012). It was disbanded following the French canton reorganisation which came into effect in March 2015.

== Composition ==
The Perpignan 8th Canton comprised part of the commune of Perpignan. It included the following neighbourhoods:

- Gare
- Saint-Assiscle
- Parc Ducup
- Route de Prades
- Saint-Charles
