= Mont-Louis Solar Furnace =

Solar thermal energy

Coordinates: 42°30′27.17″N 2°7′16.50″E

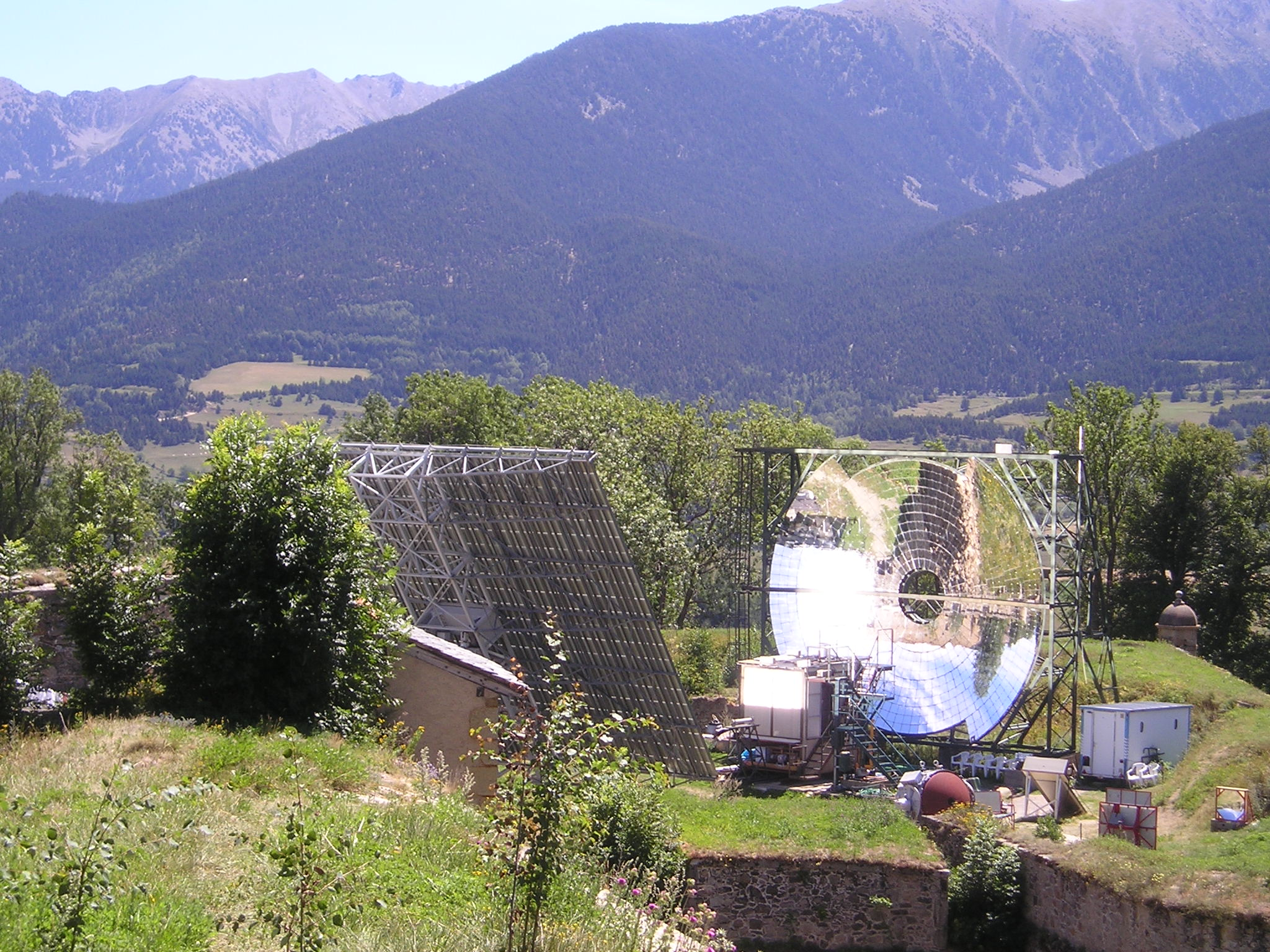
Solar furnace of Mont-Louis

The Mont-Louis Solar Furnace is an experimental solar furnace - a solar thermal energy facility that was built in 1949. It was the first facility of its kind in the world, and was a precursor of the Odeillo Solar Furnace. It provides a thermal power of 50 kW.

== History ==
The French chemist Félix Trombe and his team made an initial demonstration of a mirror of DCA in Meudon in 1946 to show the possibility of reaching high temperatures very quickly using highly concentrated sunlight. The goal was to melt ore and extract very pure substances to make new and more effective refractory materials.

In order to do further experiments, the first solar furnace was built in Mont-Louis in the Pyrénées-Orientales in 1949.

== Development and cooperation ==
The Mont-Louis Solar Furnace is engaged in a process of technology transfer to the countries of the south; the city of Safi in Morocco is participating in this process. The aim is to install in villages, solar ovens that will cook pots, plates for eating bread, building materials, and melt any metal to make pots or tools.

== Education ==
The centre gives demonstrations of its work. A guide takes visitors to the heart of the facility to explain the operation and use of the solar furnace. Applications of simple scientific and educational experiments complement the visit, for example: the concentration of the solar rays to produce temperatures between 2000 °C and 3500 °C, the ignition of wood, melting of metal, and ceramic cooking. The visit concludes with an overview of technologies that use solar energy: solar thermal, solar forge, solar cells, solar cookers.

== See also ==
- Odeillo solar furnace
