= Égat =

Égat Èguet
- Commune
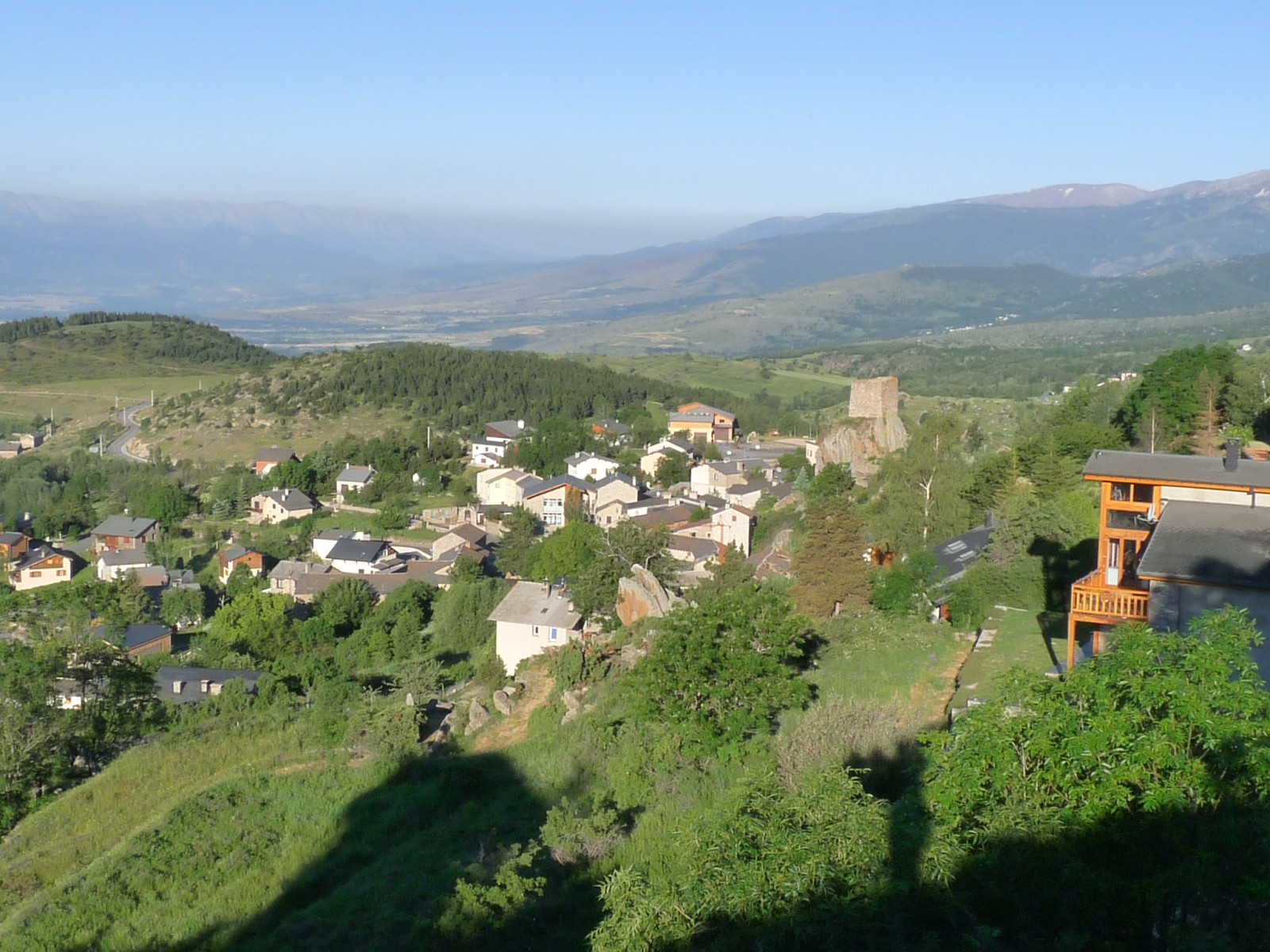
- A general view of the village of Égat
- Location of Égat
- Location within France Location within Occitanie
- Coordinates: 42°30′04″N 2°01′01″E
- Country: France
- Region: Occitania
- Department: Pyrénées-Orientales
- Arrondissement: Prades
- Canton: Les Pyrénées catalanes
- Intercommunality: Pyrénées Cerdagne

Government
  - Mayor (2020–2026): Claude Grau
- Area^{1}: 4.47 km^{2} (1.73 sq mi)
- Elevation: 1,800 m (5,900 ft)
- Highest elevation: 1,962 m (6,437 ft)
- Lowest elevation: 1,320 m (4,330 ft)
- Population (2023): 435
  - Density: 97.3/km^{2} (252/sq mi)
- Time zone: UTC+01:00 (CET)
  - Summer (DST): UTC+02:00 (CEST)
- INSEE/Postal code: 66064 /66120
- ^{1} French Land Register data, which excludes lakes, ponds, glaciers > 1 km^{2} (0.386 sq mi or 247 acres) and river estuaries.

Égat (French pronunciation: [eɡat]; Catalan: Èguet) is a commune in the Pyrénées-Orientales department in southern France.

== Geography ==
=== Localisation ===
Égat is located in the canton of Les Pyrénées catalanes and in the arrondissement of Prades.

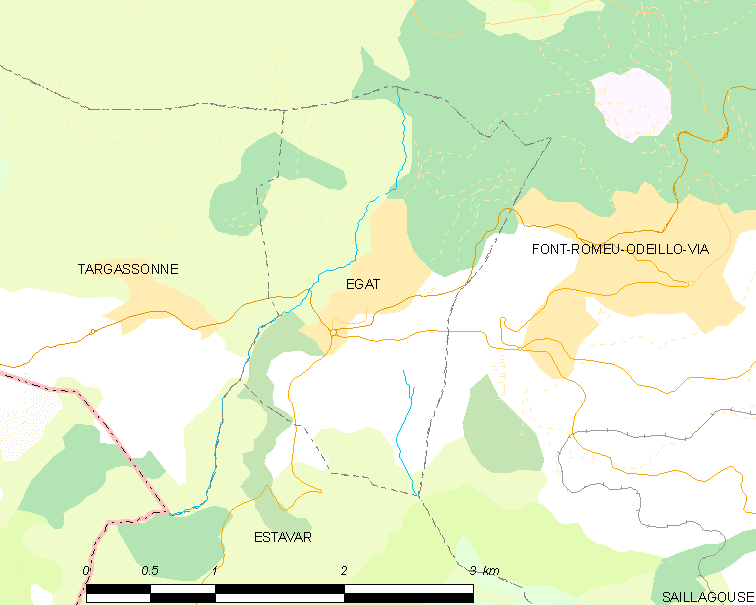
Map of Égat and its surrounding communes

== Population ==
Historical population
Year	Pop.	±% p.a.
1968	122	—
1975	202	+7.47%
1982	310	+6.31%
1990	419	+3.84%
1999	494	+1.85%
2007	459	−0.91%
2012	444	−0.66%
2017	438	−0.27%
2023	435	−0.11%
Source: INSEE

== See also ==
- Communes of the Pyrénées-Orientales department
