= Gisclareny =

- Municipality
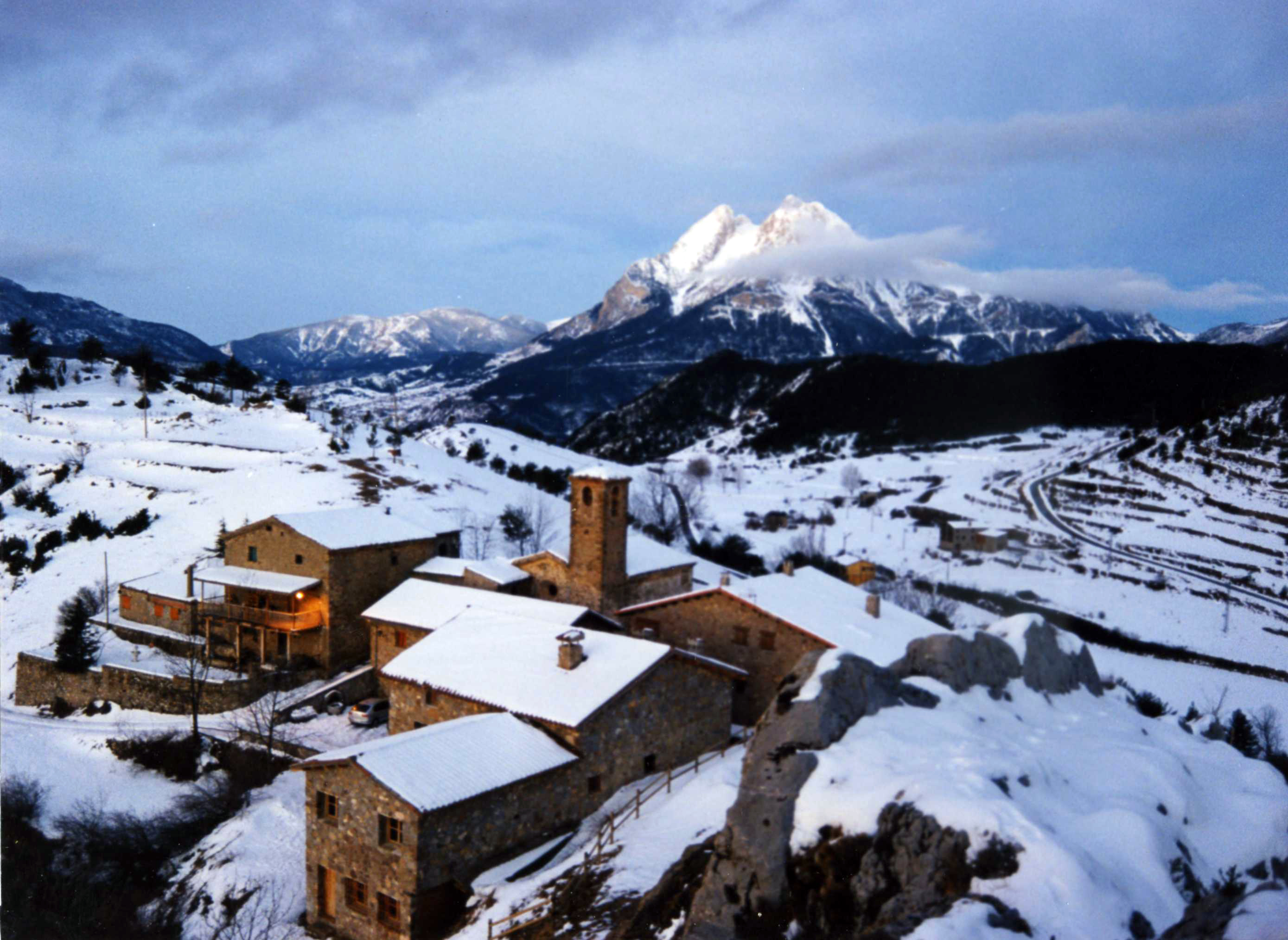

- Flag Coat of arms

- Map showing location within Berguedà

- Location in Catalonia
- Coordinates: 42°15′07″N 1°47′15″E
- Country: Spain
- Community: Catalonia
- Province: Barcelona
- Comarca: Berguedà

Government
  - Type: Consell obert
  - Mayor: Queralt Tor Guitart (ERC)

Area
  - Total: 36.5 km^{2} (14.1 sq mi)
- Elevation: 729 m (2,392 ft)

Population (2025-01-01)
  - Total: 28
  - Density: 0.77/km^{2} (2.0/sq mi)
- Demonym(s): Gisclarenyès, Gisclarenyesa
- Website: www.gisclareny.cat

Gisclareny (Catalan pronunciation: [ʒiskləˈɾɛɲ]) is a municipality in the county (Catalan: comarca) of Berguedà in Catalonia, Spain, located in Cadí-Moixeró Natural Park. In 2018 it regained its position as the smallest village in Catalonia after the village of Sant Jaume de Frontanyà grew by three families. The altitude of the village varies between 800 m (2,600 ft) in the neighborhood of Bagà and 1,430 m (4,690 ft) in the neighborhood of Coll de la Bena. It is bounded to the north by the Cerdanya, reaching the peaks of the Serra del Cadí, and by Bagà; to the south and west by Saldes and Vallcebre; and to the east by Bagà and Guardiola de Berguedà. The landscape is characterised by alpine forests and meadows, with farmhouses scattered throughout the territory.

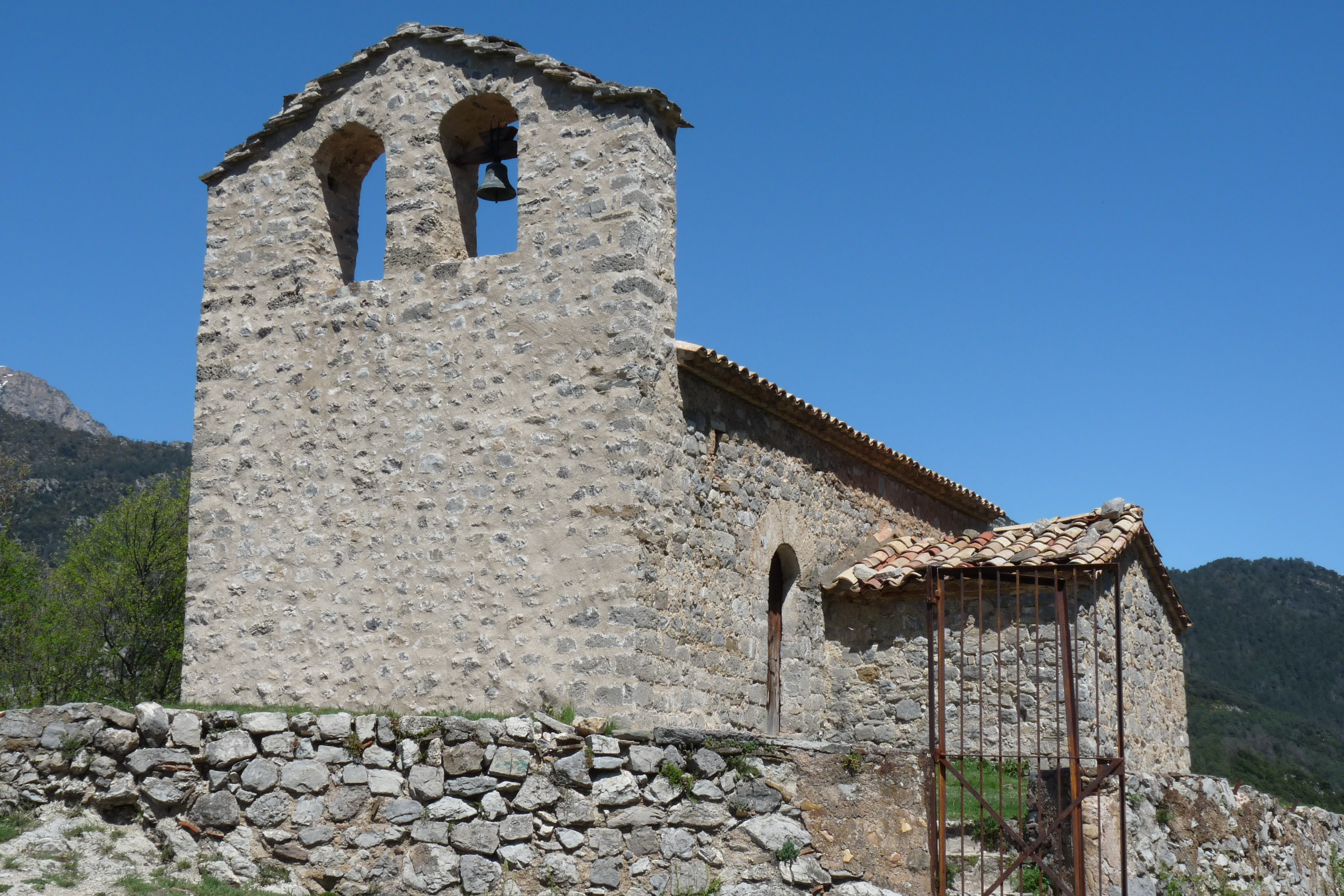
Hermitage of Sant Martí del Puig, Gisclareny

== Economy ==
Agriculture is the mainstay of Gisclarany's economy, and in particular dryland farming and animal husbandry.
