= Cadí Tunnel =

Toll road tunnel in Catalonia, Spain

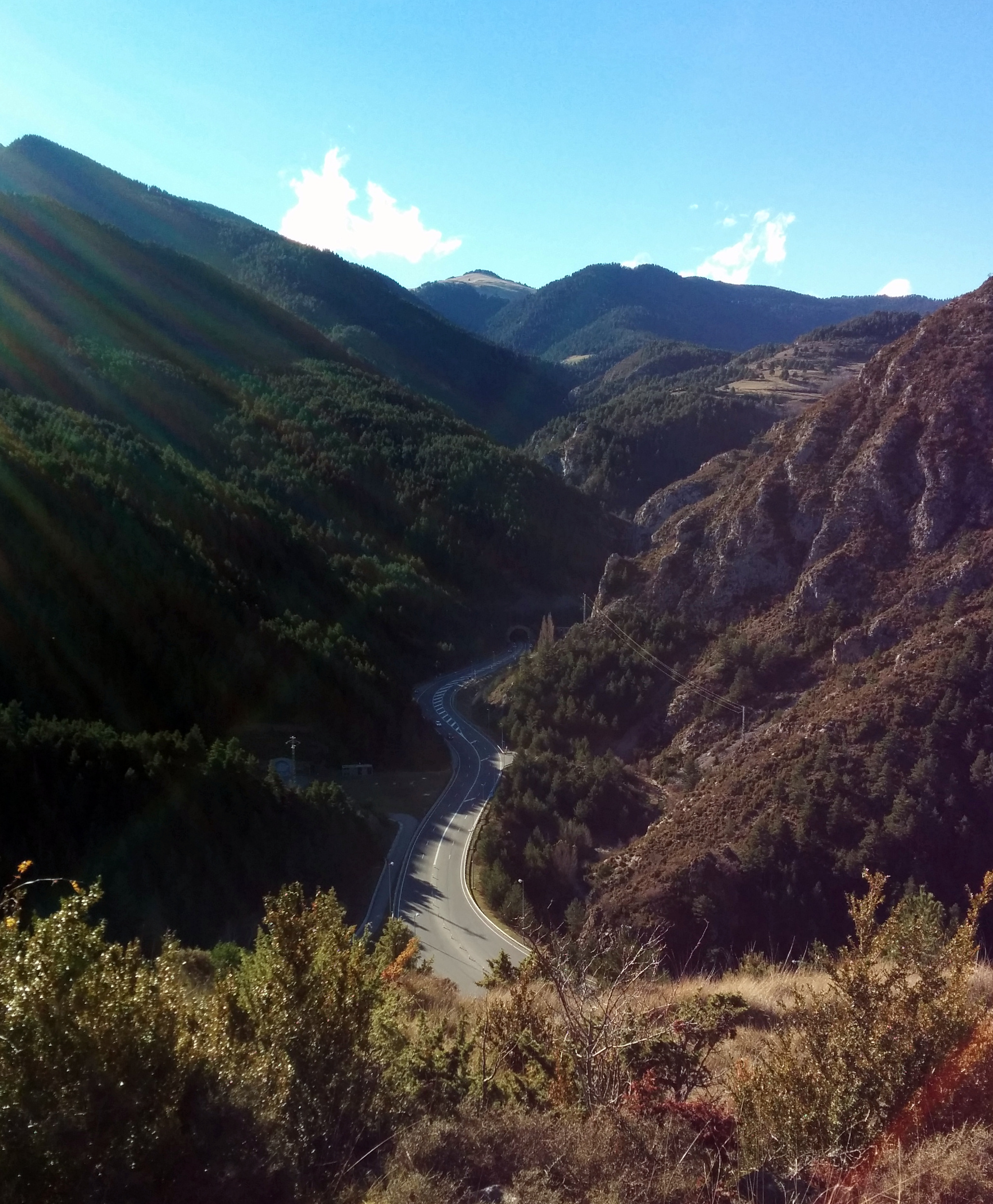
- Entrance to the Cadí Tunnel from Urús
- Interactive map of Cadí Tunnel

Overview
- Location: Cerdanya and Berguedà, Catalonia, Spain
- Status: Active
- Route: C-16; E-9
- Start: Urús, Cerdanya; 42°20′6″N 1°50′15″E
- End: Guardiola de Berguedà, Berguedà; 42°17′41″N 1°51′47″E

Operation
- Opened: 30 October 1984
- Vehicles per day: 6679 (2010)

Technical
- Length: 5026 m

Cadí Tunnel (Catalan and Spanish: Túnel del Cadí) is a toll road tunnel in Catalonia, Spain, connecting the comarques of Cerdanya and Berguedà. The tunnel, with a length of 5,026 m (16,490 ft), is part of the C-16 highway and E-9, running under the Serra de Moixeró mountain range in the Pre-Pyrenees.

It comprises two lanes separated by a 2-meter-wide (6.6 ft) safety zone in the middle. The southern entrance, at an altitude of 1,175 m (3,855 ft), is located in the settlement of Gréixer, part of the municipality of Guardiola de Berguedà, in the watershed of the Llobregat river. The northern entrance is in Cerdanya, in the municipality of Urús, part of the Segre watershed, and is at a height of 1,236 m (4,055 ft).

== Name ==
The Serra de Moixeró is often confused with the nearby Serra del Cadí range, hence the tunnel's naming after the latter. Both ranges are within the Cadí-Moixeró Natural Park, which also includes nearby Pedraforca.

== History ==
In 1973 the company Promociones Pirinaicas, S.A. was granted a license by the government to build, maintain, and manage a tunnel through the Serra del Cadí. Work on the project began in 1978, with the completed tunnel and its access roads inaugurated on 29 October 1984. This work completed a segment of the C-1411 highway, intended to run from Manresa to Bellver de Cerdanya. Since then, this segment has been added to the C-16 highway, "Eix del Llobregat", which runs from Barcelona to Puigcerdà, and thence to Orleans as part of European route E9.
