= Montmajor =

- Municipality
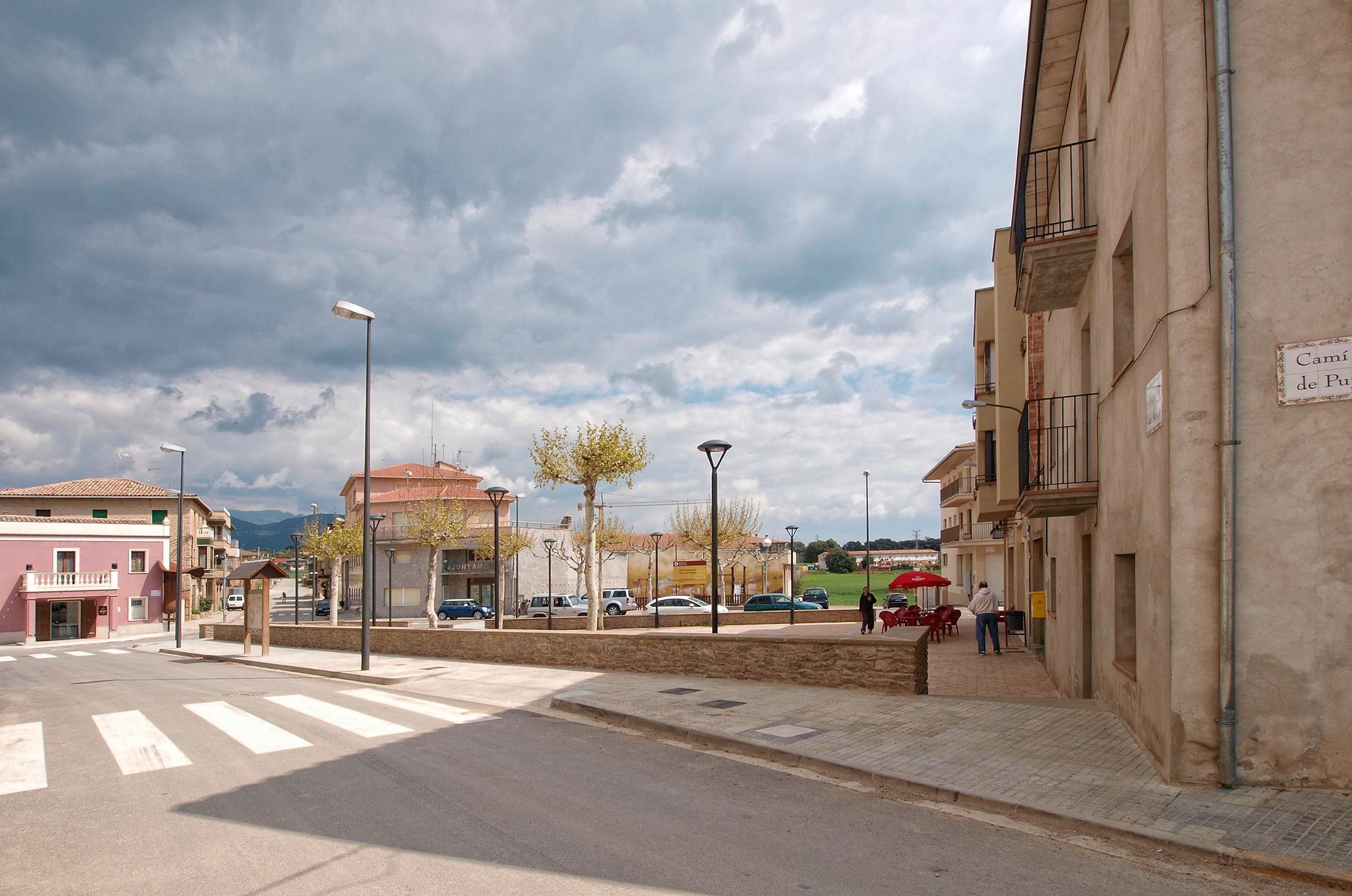
- Market square, Montmajor

- Flag Coat of arms

- Map showing location within Berguedà

- Location in Catalonia Montmajor (Spain)
- Coordinates: 42.019°N 1.736°E
- Country: Spain
- Community: Catalonia
- Province: Barcelona
- Comarca: Berguedà

Government
  - Mayor: Maria Teresa Marmí Figols (2015) (CiU)

Area
  - Total: 76.5 km^{2} (29.5 sq mi)
- Elevation: 756 m (2,480 ft)

Population (2025-01-01)
  - Total: 473
  - Density: 6.18/km^{2} (16.0/sq mi)
- Demonym(s): Montmajorenc, montmajorenca
- Website: montmajor.cat

Montmajor (Catalan pronunciation: [mumːəˈʒo]) is a municipality in the comarca of Berguedà, Catalonia, Spain.

== Geography ==
Montmajor is made up of four distinct enclaves, quite separated from one another. The principal area of the municipality lies east of the town of Navès, which is in the comarca of Solsonès. The northernmost enclave is Catllarí (5.45 km²), which is surrounded by the municipalities of Fígols, Castellar del Riu, and Guixers. Comesposades (8.01 km²), is separated from the main town by L'Espunyola. Valielles (3.20 km²), meanwhile, is an enclave completely surrounded by Solsonès.
