= Gósol =

- Municipality
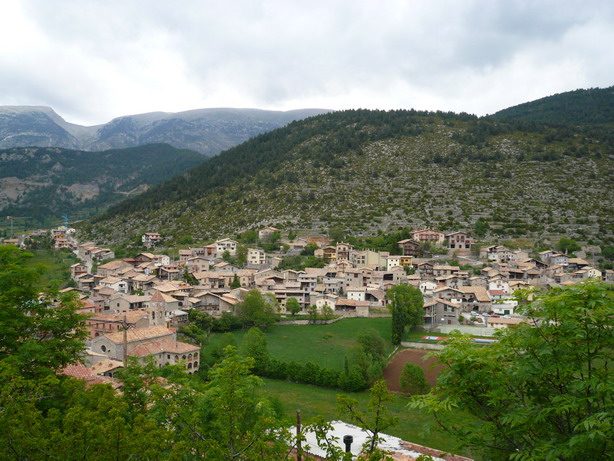

- Coat of arms

- Location in Catalonia Gósol (Spain)
- Coordinates: 42°14′N 1°40′E
- Country: Spain
- Community: Catalonia
- Province: Lleida
- Comarca: Berguedà

Government
  - Mayor: RAFAEL LÓPEZ GÓMEZ ([ERC])

Area
  - Total: 56.3 km^{2} (21.7 sq mi)
- Elevation: 1,502 m (4,928 ft)

Population (2025-01-01)
  - Total: 205
  - Density: 3.64/km^{2} (9.43/sq mi)
- Demonym(s): Gosolà, gosolana
- Website: gosol.ddl.net

Gósol (Catalan pronunciation: [ˈgozul]) is a village and municipality located in the northwest of the comarca of Berguedà in Catalonia, Spain. It is within the confines of Cadí-Moixeró Natural Park in the Pyrenees, to the west of Pedraforca.

It has a population of 205 (register office, 2025).

Gósol is the only municipality in Berguedà which is in the province of Lleida rather than that of Barcelona. It is also a party to the Judicial district of La Seu d'Urgell.

== Geography ==
The present town is centered in the eponymous valley of Gósol, which is enclosed by the Serra del Cadí and Pedraforca, in the Pyrenees. The ruins of the former town and castle, dating from the 11th century, overlook the Gósol from an adjacent hill.

== Villages within Gósol ==
The municipal limits of Gósol includes, most notably, the village of Sorribes. Other settlements include Bonner, la Collada, Molí d'en Güell, Moripol, Castell de Termes, Font Terrers, and Torrent Senta.

== Climate ==
Gósol has a cool subalpine climate. Compared to less mountainous areas of Catalonia it is rather wet. It receives over 900 mm (35.43 in.) of precipitation each year, concentrated in the spring months.

== Culture ==
Gosol's emblematic cultural institution is the Picasso Museum, which owes its existence to the visit of Pablo Picasso to the village from the spring of 1906 to mid-August of that same year. The artist installed himself at the only inn then in existence, Cal Tampanada. While in Gósol, Picasso underwent a transformation of palette, sketching style, and rhythm of composition. Picasso found his subjects in local livestock and people of Gósol, as well as Fernande Olivier, his partner.

=== Notable dates ===
- The town's festa major, or town festival, takes place on August 15 each year. It is most notable for its unique folk dance, the "Ball de les cosses."
- On New Year's Eve (Saint Sylvester), legend says that witches hold gatherings on Pedraforca mountain.

=== Local dishes ===
- Pèsol negre, a local variety of 'black pea'
- Blat de moro escairat, or 'peeled corn', often cooked in a pork broth
- Patates emmascarades, or "Masked Potatoes", mashed potatoes cooked with blood or black pudding
- All i oli with pork, eaten during the swine-harvest in fall
- Veal with wild mushrooms
- Wild boar
