= Serra del Cadí =

Mountain range in north Catalonia

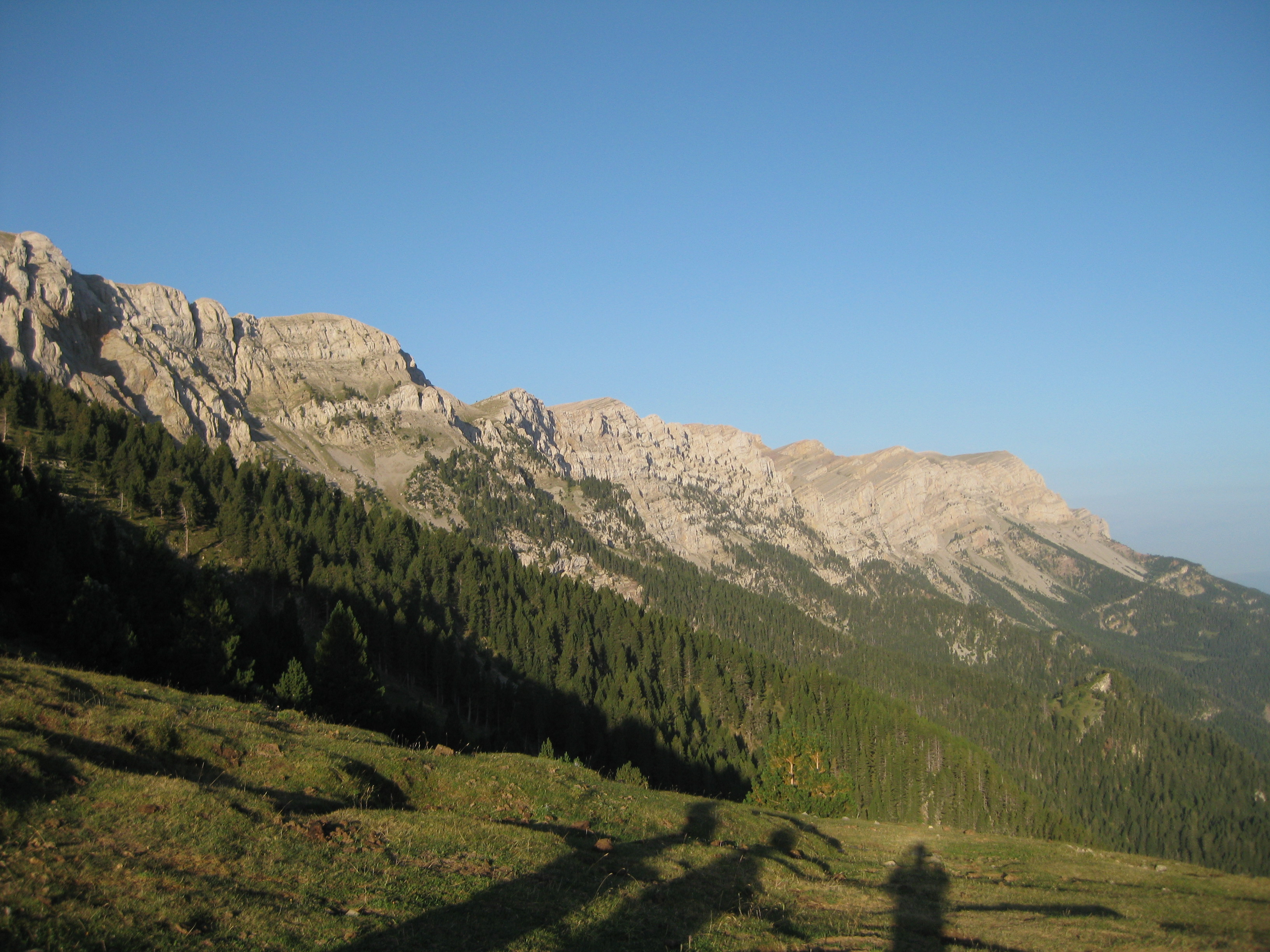
- View of the Cadí mountain range

Highest point
- Peak: Vulturó
- Elevation: 2,648 m (8,688 ft)
- Coordinates: 42°17′24.50″N 1°37′08.33″E

Dimensions
- Length: 22.6 km (14.0 mi) E/W
- Width: 8 km (5.0 mi) N/S

Geography
- Location within Pyrenees
- Country: Spain
- Community: Catalonia
- Comarques: Alt Urgell, Baixa Cerdanya and Berguedà
- Parent range: Pre-Pyrenees, central/eastern zone

Geology
- Orogeny: Alpine orogeny
- Rock age: Eocene
- Rock type: Limestone

The Serra del Cadí is a mountain range in the north of Catalonia, Spain, part of the Pre-Pyrenees. Its highest peak is the Vulturó, with an altitude of 2,648 metres (8,688 ft).

It stretches from east to west between Alt Urgell and Berguedà. The Llobregat River has its sources in Castellar de n'Hug at an altitude of 1,259 meters on the Serra del Cadí.

== Description ==
Geologically the northern slopes are made up of Jurassic materials while the peaks are Eocene limestone. The northern face is an almost continuous series of sheer cliffs. The present structure formed during the Tertiary as a consequence of the orogenesis of the Pyrenees and is characterized by its Alpine folding.

This jagged mountain range was formerly a natural barrier hampering communication between Barcelona and Cerdanya, but the situation was resolved after the Cadí Tunnel was built together with the C-16 highway which follows the valley of the Llobregat.

Believed to be extinct in Catalonia, the first wolf in 80 years was found recently in the Serra del Cadí.

== Protected areas ==
Cadí-Moixeró Natural Park was created in July 1983 to protect the Serra del Cadí, as well as the adjacent Serra de Moixeró, Pedraforca mountain, and part of the Tosa d'Alp and Puigllançada.
