= C-16 highway (Spain) =

Highway in Catalonia, Spain

Coordinates: 42°00′38″N 1°52′53″E

C-16
- Eix del Llobregat

Route information
- Length: 130 km (81 mi)

Major junctions
- From: Barcelona
- To: Puigcerdà

Location
- Country: Spain

Highway system
- Highways in Spain; Autopistas and autovías; National Roads

C-16 or Eix del Llobregat is a primary highway in Catalonia, Spain. It is also part of the European route E9, from Orléans (France) to Barcelona (Catalonia, Spain). The section of C-16 Sant Cugat to Manresa is a toll road.

According to the 2004 new codification for primary highways managed by the Generalitat de Catalunya, the first number (C-16) indicates that is a south-northbound highway, whereas the second number (C-16) indicates that is the sixth westernmost.

The road starts at Barcelona's Via Augusta and heads northbound crossing the Serra de Collserola mountain range, through the Vallvidrera tunnel, and then the comarques of Vallès Occidental, Bages and Berguedà. Most of the route follows the valley of the Llobregat river, hence the name Eix del Llobregat. Finally it crosses another mountain range, the Serra del Cadí, through the Cadí Tunnel, and enters the comarca of Cerdanya. The highway finishes at the connection with road N-260 at Puigcerdà, very close to the French border.

This highway, along with C-17, is a main south–north link in Catalonia, since it connects Barcelona with several significant inland cities and towns such as Terrassa, Manresa, Berga, and Puigcerdà. It is also the straightest and quickest way from the Cerdanya comarca and from Andorra to the centre, south, and east of Catalonia.
