= Olvan =

- Municipality
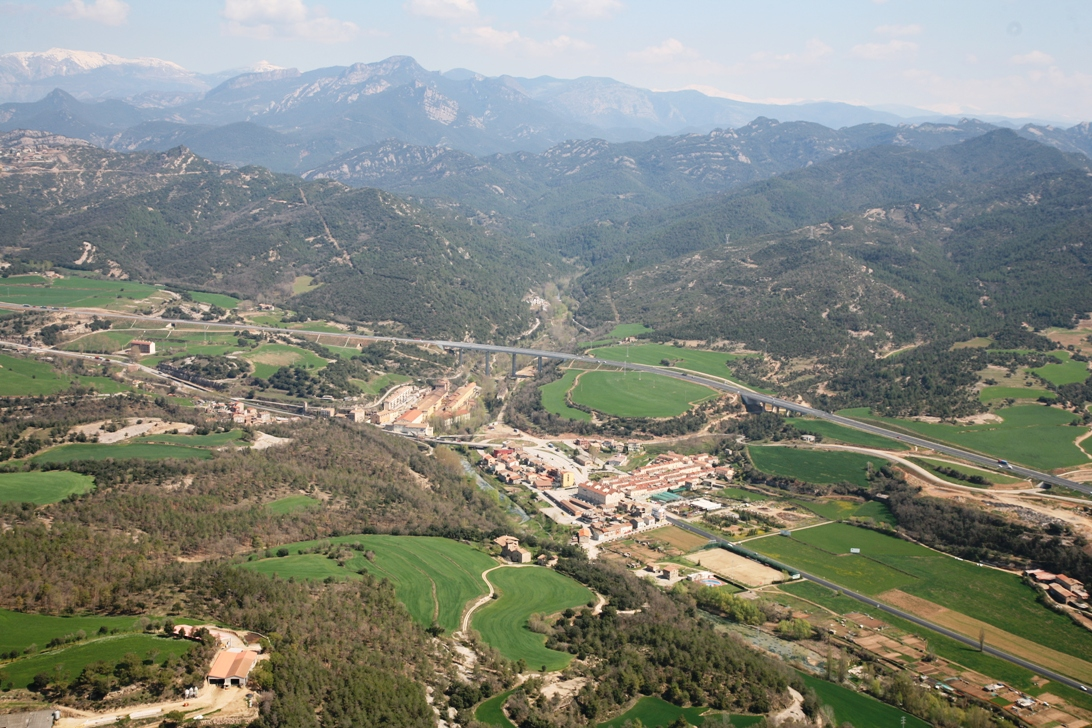
- Cal Rosal

- Coat of arms

- Map showing location within Berguedà

- Location in Catalonia Olvan (Spain)
- Coordinates: 42°03′31″N 1°54′22″E
- Country: Spain
- Community: Catalonia
- Province: Barcelona
- Comarca: Berguedà

Government
  - Mayor: Martí Orriols Soler (2015) (CiU)

Area
  - Total: 35.6 km^{2} (13.7 sq mi)
- Elevation: 553 m (1,814 ft)

Population (2025-01-01)
  - Total: 924
  - Density: 26.0/km^{2} (67.2/sq mi)
- Demonym(s): Olvanès, olvanesa
- Website: olvan.cat

Olvan (Catalan pronunciation: [ulˈβan]) is a municipality in the comarca of Berguedà, Catalonia. It is made up of the town of Olvan and part of the former industrial colony of Cal Rosal, on the Llobregat river.

== Economy ==
The most important industry in Olvan is agriculture, especially the cultivation of grains and potatoes, as well as the raising of pigs. The village of Olvan has two small groceries and two cafés, and its inhabitants are largely reliant on the stops in Gironella. Located on the main highway, Cal Rosal has many businesses.

Cal Rosal was centered on an important textile factory until it closed in 1991. Today, there is still an industrial park within the municipality.

== Sites of Interest ==
- The chapel of Santa Maria de Valldaura once part of a Cistercian nunnery.
- The church of L'Assumpció de la Mare de Déu, the parish church of Olvan. Originally romanesque, it has undergone many modifications.
- The farm of Fuïves, the primary breeding center for the Catalan donkey. The farm is open to visitors.
