= Montclar, Spain =

Montclar
- Municipality
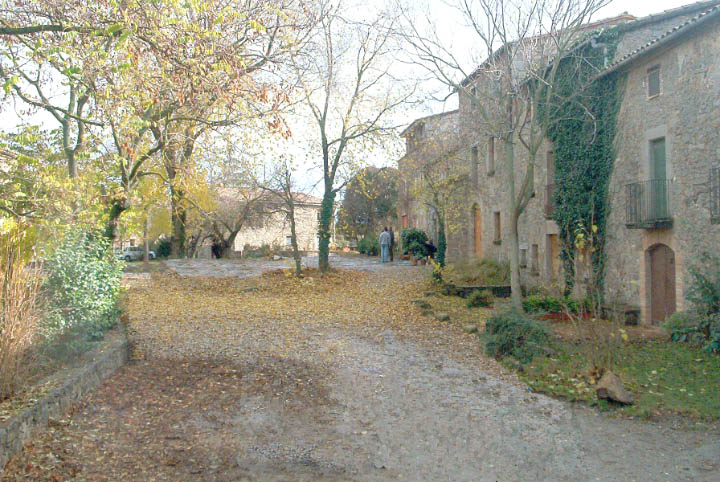

- Flag Coat of arms

- Map showing location within Berguedà

- Location in Catalonia Montclar (Spain)
- Coordinates: 42°01′13″N 1°45′54″E
- Country: Spain
- Community: Catalonia
- Province: Barcelona
- Comarca: Berguedà

Government
  - Mayor: Raquel Sala Prat (2015) (M-AM)

Area
  - Total: 21.9 km^{2} (8.5 sq mi)
- Elevation: 728 m (2,388 ft)

Population (2025-01-01)
  - Total: 132
  - Density: 6.03/km^{2} (15.6/sq mi)
- Demonym(s): Montclarenc, montclarenca
- Website: www.montclar.cat

Montclar (Catalan pronunciation: [muŋˈkla]) is a municipality in the comarca of Berguedà, Catalonia. The municipality includes an exclave to the north-east.

== History ==
The town first appears in written documentation in the year 1117. In 1240, King James I of Aragon granted the land to Pere de Breda, though by 1309, it was once again a possession of the crown.

== Culture ==
The municipality's parochial church, in the Romanesque style, is dedicated to Sant Martí. It was constructed in the 12th century. It has a single nave with apse. It also has a later, hip-roofed bell tower, and conserves a baroque altar and other neoclassical elements in the interior. The church was completely renovated in 1970.

The municipality has several other extant churches, including the Church of the Santa Creu, and, notably, the Church of Sant Quintí. This barrel-vaulted structure had its 11th century reliquary removed to the Diocesan Museum of Solsona.

Montclar's town festival is celebrated in January, to coincide with the feast day of Saint Sebastian.

== Economy ==
Agriculture is the chief employer of the municipality, and in particular dryland farming, particularly of cereals.
