= Castell de l'Areny =

- Municipality
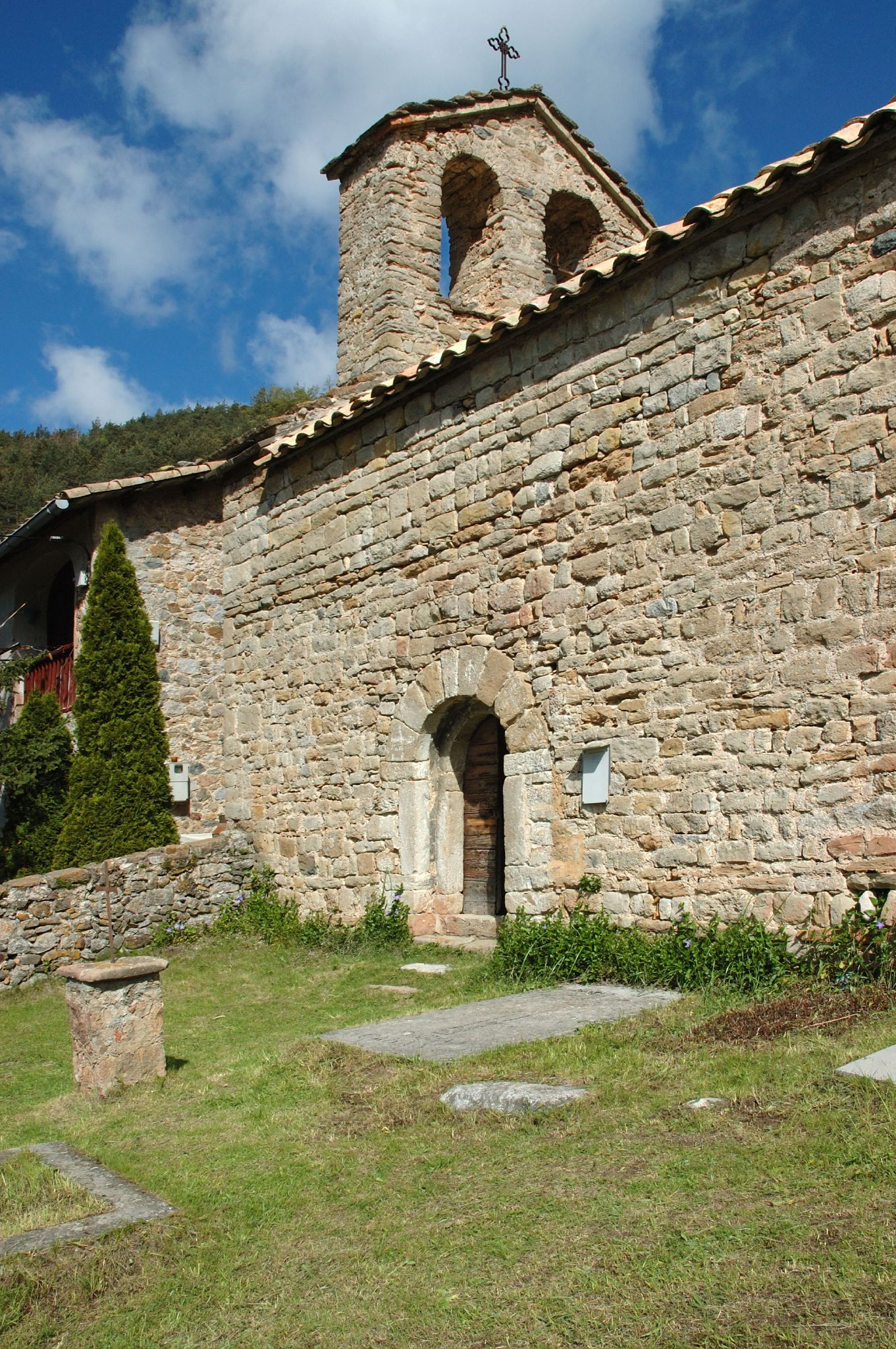
- Church of Sant Romà de la Clusa

- Coat of arms

- Location in Catalonia
- Coordinates: 42°10′29″N 1°56′49″E
- Country: Spain
- Community: Catalonia
- Province: Barcelona
- Comarca: Berguedà

Government
  - Type: Consell obert
  - Mayor: Marta Puigantell i Busqueta (ERC)

Area
  - Total: 24.4 km^{2} (9.4 sq mi)
- Elevation: 954 m (3,130 ft)

Population (2025-01-01)
  - Total: 68
  - Density: 2.8/km^{2} (7.2/sq mi)
- Website: castelldelareny.cat

Castell de l'Areny (Catalan pronunciation: [kəsˈteʎ ðələˈɾɛɲ]) is a small town and municipality in the comarca of Berguedà, Catalonia. The old town of Sant Romà de la Clusa is within the municipal limits.

== Places of interest ==
- Church of Sant Vicenç, Romanesque
- Church of Sant Romà de la Clusa, Romanesque
