= Capolat =

- Municipality
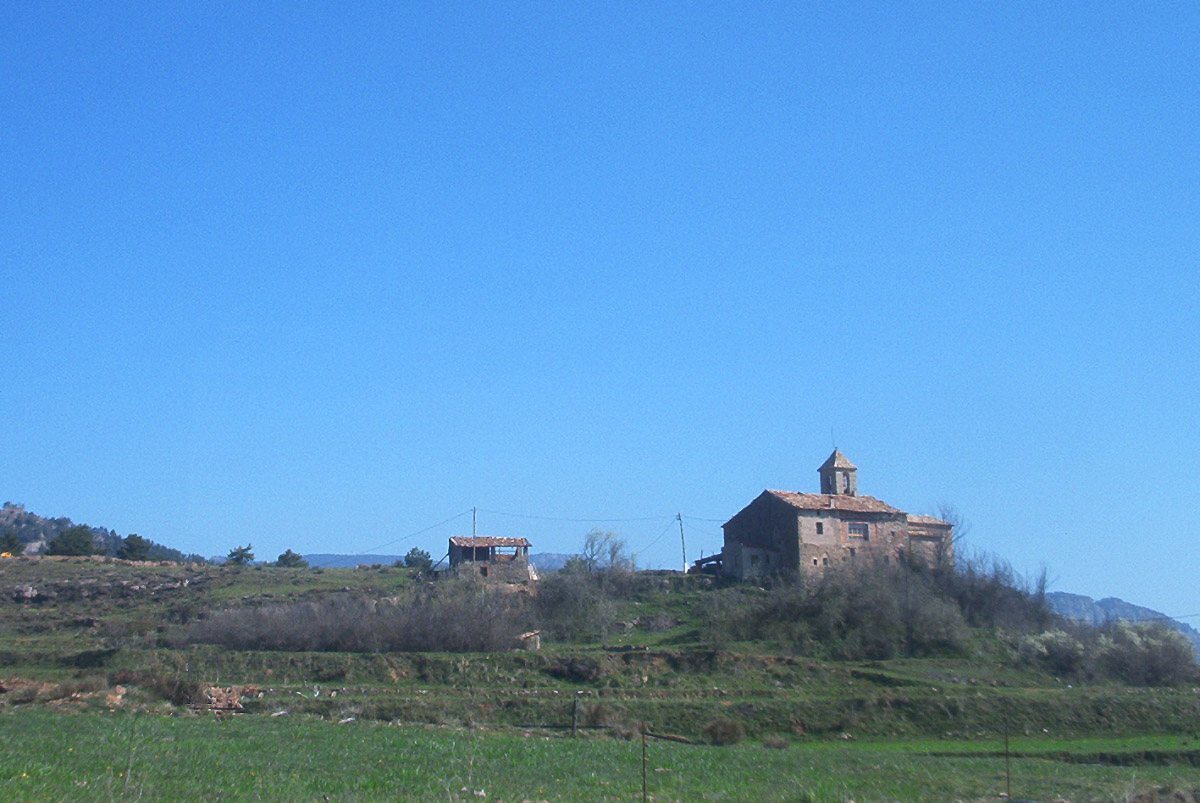
- Capolat

- Map showing location within Berguedà

- Location in Catalonia Capolat (Spain)
- Coordinates: 42°04′48″N 1°45′16″E
- Country: Spain
- Community: Catalonia
- Province: Barcelona
- Comarca: Berguedà

Government
  - Mayor: Mireia Besora Sans (2015) (Independents per Capolat)

Area
  - Total: 34.1 km^{2} (13.2 sq mi)
- Elevation: 1,279 m (4,196 ft)

Population (2025-01-01)
  - Total: 93
  - Density: 2.7/km^{2} (7.1/sq mi)
- Website: www.capolat.cat

Capolat (Catalan pronunciation: [kəpuˈlat]) is a municipality in the comarca of Berguedà, Catalonia, Spain.

The geography is mountainous, reaching 1500 meters about sea level. The population has always been sparsely settled due to the topography. As in much of the rest of the region, the population peaked in the nineteenth century, and since then has gradually declined.

== Economy ==
The economy is chiefly agricultural, with a particular prevalence of animal husbandry and dryland farming. Much of the land is occupied by pine and oak forests, and logging is an important part of the economy. Crops grown include potatoes, wheat and corn, almost all farms raise livestock (especially cattle, pigs and lambs).

== History ==
The town sprang up around Capolat Castle home, of the local aristocratic family. Bishop Nantigís of Urgell founded a Benedictine Monastery here on 13 December 899. In 905 the monastery was gifted by Adalaiz, a countess and daughter of Counts Suniari and Richildis, to the monastery of Sant Joan de les Abadesses.

The parish church of Sant Martí de Coforb is first mentioned in the act of consecration of the cathedral of Urgell of 839. The Romanesque church of Sant Serni de Terrers at the northwest of the commune dates to the 13th century.

== Sites of interest ==
The municipality has three Romanesque churches of interest:

- Church of Sant Salvador de Capolat
- Church of Sant Andreu de la Serreta
- Church of Sant Serni de la Torre
