= Vallcebre =

- Municipality
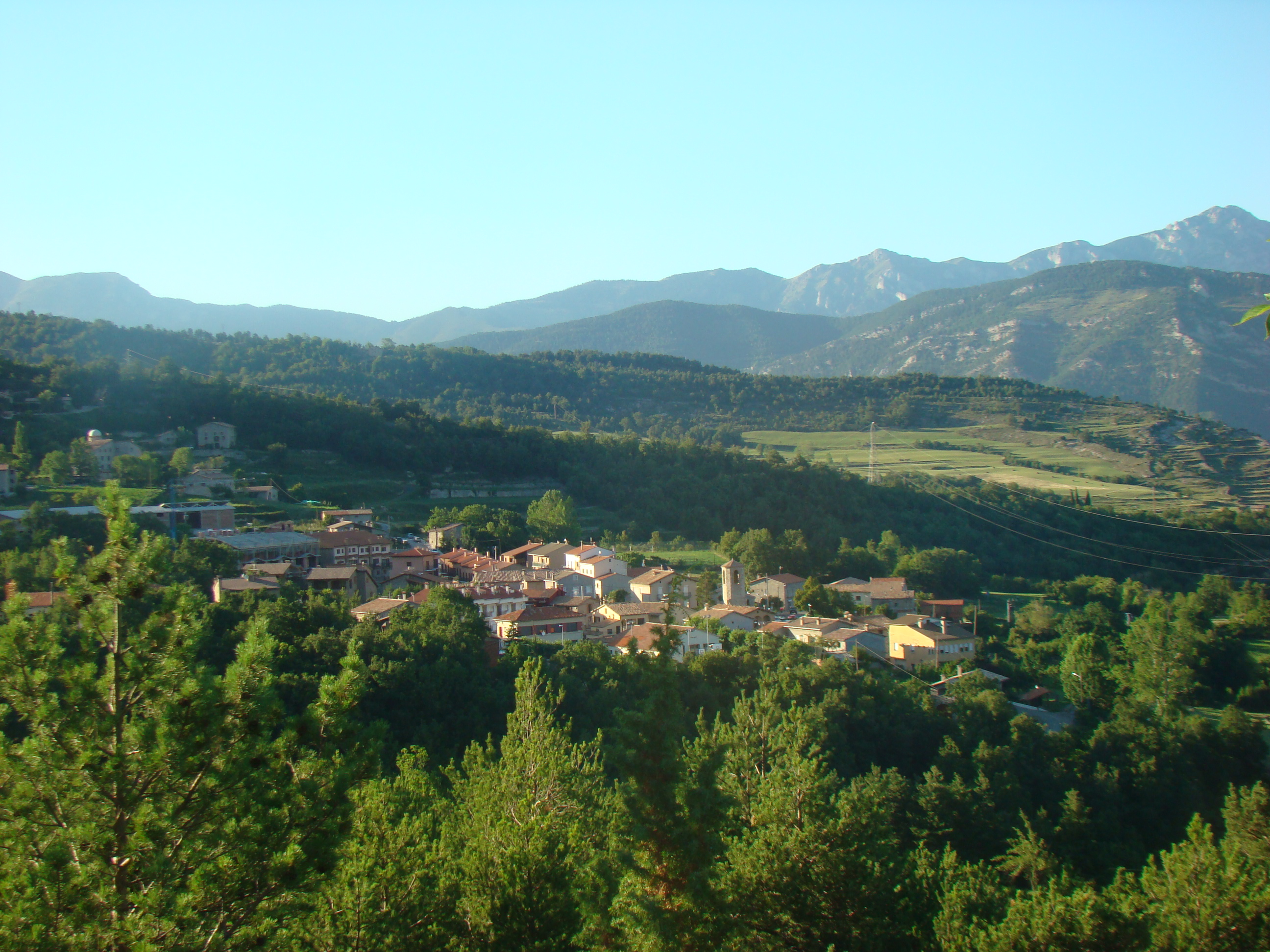

- Flag Coat of arms

- Map showing location within Berguedà

- Location in Catalonia Vallcebre (Spain)
- Coordinates: 42°12′20″N 1°49′10″E
- Country: Spain
- Community: Catalonia
- Province: Barcelona
- Comarca: Berguedà

Government
  - Mayor: Lluís Cadena Andreu (2015) (CiU)

Area
  - Total: 28.0 km^{2} (10.8 sq mi)
- Elevation: 1,123 m (3,684 ft)

Population (2025-01-01)
  - Total: 260
  - Density: 9.3/km^{2} (24/sq mi)
- Demonym(s): Vallcebrès, vallcebresa
- Website: www.vallcebre.cat

Vallcebre (Catalan pronunciation: [ˌbaʎˈseβɾə]) is a municipality in the comarca of Berguedà, Catalonia. It comprises two towns: Vallcebre proper, and the village of Sant Julià de Fréixens.

== History ==
The town was first documented in the year 893, when it was mentioned as Balcebre in a document describing the consecration of the Cathedral of la Seu d'Urgell. By 983, a castle existed in the town, of which there is no trace today.

The municipality in former times was controlled in part by the Abbot of Bagà and the barons of Peguera. By the 15th century, it had become part of the possessions of the Foix family.

== Culture ==
The parochial church is dedicated to the Virgin Mary, the patroness of the town, and is of relatively recent origin, having only been constructed in 1931. By 1991, it had become a ruin, and was therefore rebuilt in 2000. In the urban center of the town, however, the tiny romanesque church of Sant Julià de Fréixens is located. Consisting of a single, barrel-vaulted nave, it has been restored numerous times, leaving little of the original structure.

== Economy ==
The municipality's economy is focused largely on the service sectors. Generally rural, agriculture in the municipality is concerned primarily with cereals and potatoes.
