= Vilada =

- Municipality
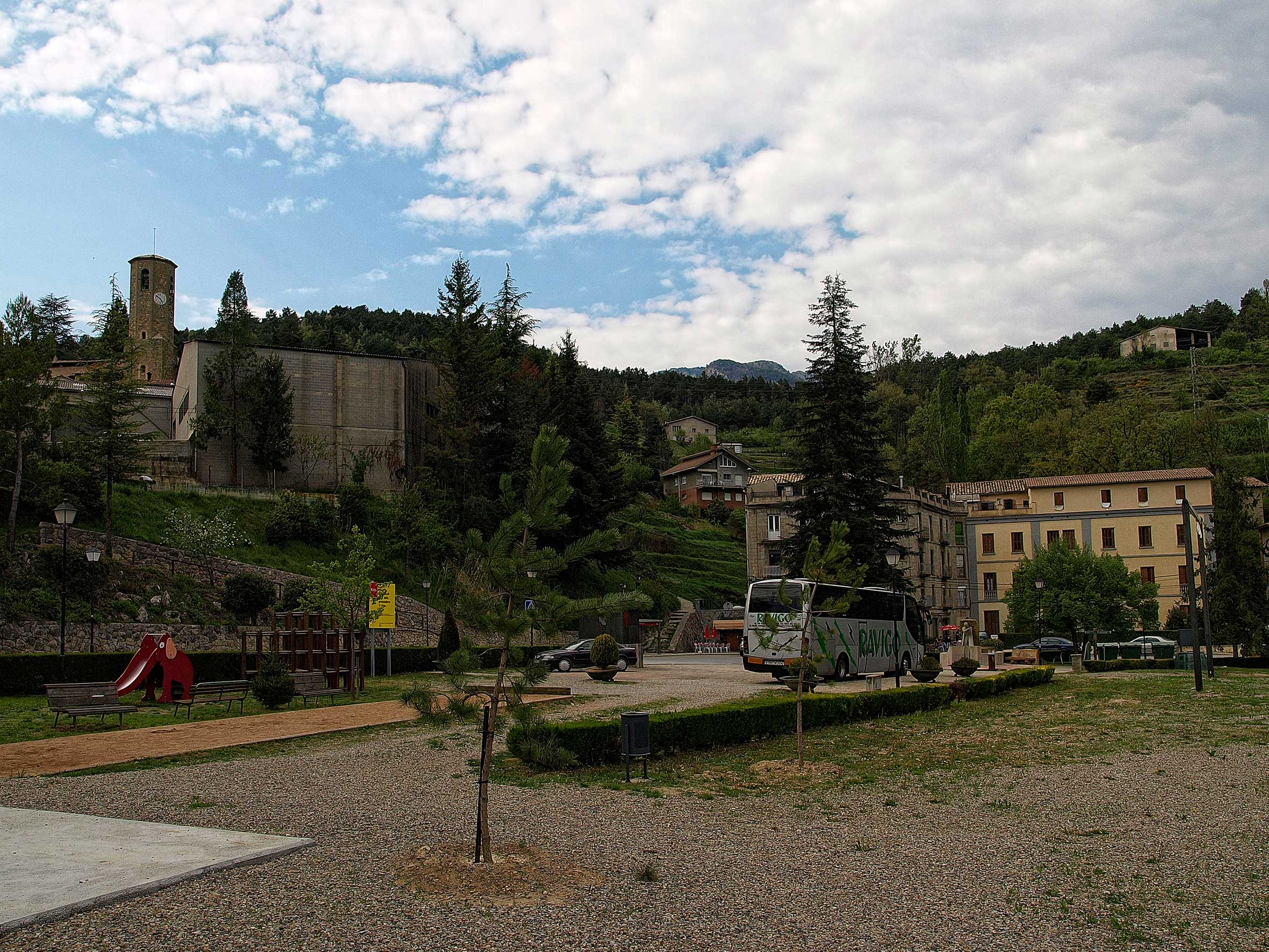
- Square in Vilada

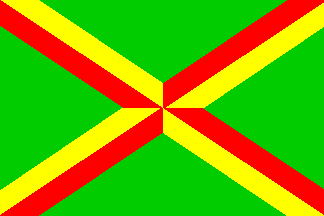
- Flag Coat of arms

- Map showing location within Berguedà

- Location in Catalonia Vilada (Spain)
- Coordinates: 42°08′19″N 1°55′52″E
- Country: Spain
- Community: Catalonia
- Province: Barcelona
- Comarca: Berguedà

Government
  - Mayor: Montserrat Badia Piqué (2015) (Fem Pinya per Vilada-CP)

Area
  - Total: 22.3 km^{2} (8.6 sq mi)
- Elevation: 757 m (2,484 ft)

Population (2025-01-01)
  - Total: 432
  - Density: 19.4/km^{2} (50.2/sq mi)
- Website: vilada.cat

Vilada (Catalan pronunciation: [biˈlaðə]) is a municipality in the comarca of Berguedà, Catalonia, of about 500 residents. Its name is documented in the 9th century as Villalata, translated as "ample town".

== Demonym ==
Vilada has no demonym. While the appropriate name in Catalan would be Viladí or Viladina, this can cause confusion with residents of a neighborhood of the comarca's capital, Berga, named "Viladins". Therefore, residents are simply de Vilada.

== Places of interest ==
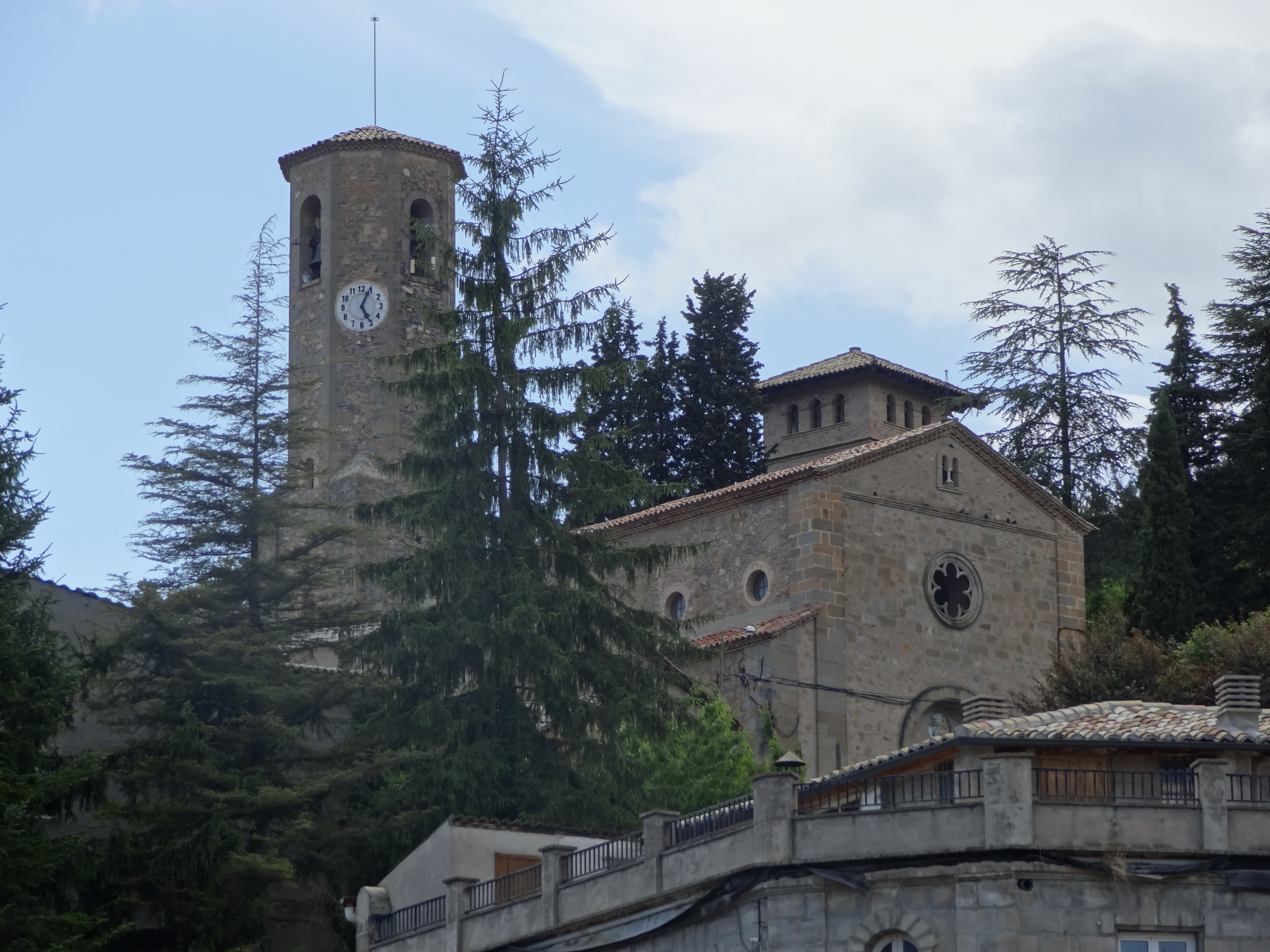
Parish church of Saint John the Baptist

- Parish church of Saint John the Baptist.
- Church of Santa Magdalena de Gardilans.
- Ruins of the Castell de Roset.
- Church of Sant Miquel de les Canals.
