= Vulturó =

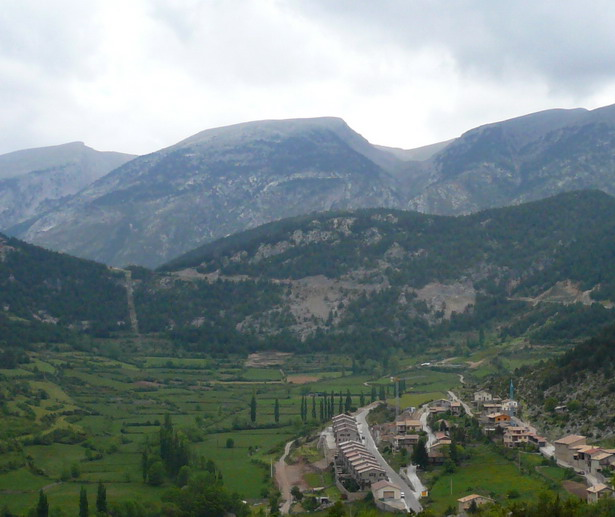
- Vulturó seen from Santa Maria del Castell in Gósol

Highest point
- Elevation: 2,648 m (8,688 ft)
- Listing: Mountains in Catalonia
- Coordinates: 42°17′09″N 1°38′11″E

Geography
- Location within Catalonia
- Location: Alt Urgell, Catalonia, Spain
- Parent range: Serra del Cadí

Geology
- Mountain type: Karstic

Vulturó (Catalan pronunciation: [bultuˈɾo]) is a mountain located in the comarca of Alt Urgell in Catalonia, Spain. It has an elevation of 2,648 metres above sea level. It is the highest mountain in the Serra del Cadí mountain range, and in the Catalan Pre-Pyrenees.
