= Sant Jaume de Frontanyà =

- Municipality
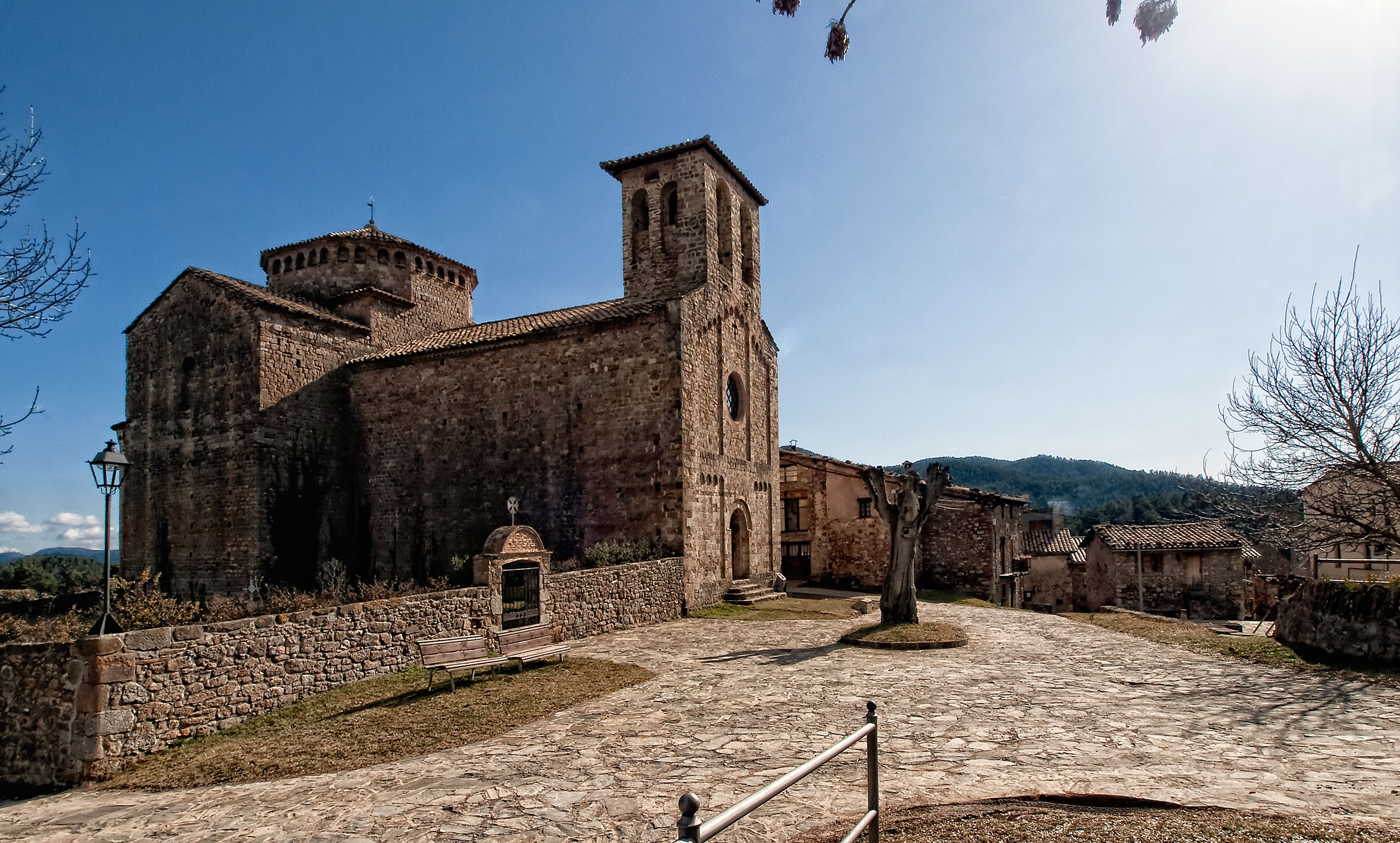
- Parish church

- Flag Coat of arms

- Location in Catalonia Sant Jaume de Frontanyà (Spain)
- Coordinates: 42°11′20″N 2°01′33″E
- Country: Spain
- Community: Catalonia
- Province: Barcelona
- Comarca: Berguedà

Government
  - Mayor: Rubén Lladós Gómez (2015) (ERC-AM)

Area
  - Total: 21.3 km^{2} (8.2 sq mi)
- Elevation: 1,072 m (3,517 ft)

Population (2025-01-01)
  - Total: 25
  - Density: 1.2/km^{2} (3.0/sq mi)
- Demonym(s): Frontanyenc, Frontanyenca
- Website: santjaumedefrontanya.cat

Sant Jaume de Frontanyà (Catalan pronunciation: [ˈsaɲ ˈʒawmə ðə fɾuntəˈɲa]) is a municipality in the comarca of the Berguedà in Catalonia, Spain. It is situated in the Pyrenees below the peak of Pedró de Tubau (1543 m). The village was the smallest municipality in Catalonia in terms of population but in 2018 lost the title to Gisclareny after the village grew. The monumental Romanesque church of Sant Jaume is a protected historic-artistic monument from the 11th century. The village is served by a local road to Borredà and it is well known for its peace and tranquility.

== History ==
The town was first documented in 905, at the consecration of the Church of Sant Jaume Vell. The guesthouse and restaurant Fonda Cal Marxandó has been welcoming visitors since 1851.

In December 2009 it was the second town in Catalonia to hold a Catalan independence referendum, voting overwhelmingly in favour.

The book Sant Jaume de Frontanyà: Natura, Art i Pau ("Nature, Art and Peace") was published in 2005, written by experts from the area.

== Places of interest ==
- Monastery of Sant Jaume de Frontanyà. 11th century
- Hermitage of Sant Esteve de Tubau. Pre-Romanesque origin.
- Shrine of Our Lady of Oms. 18th century

== Demography ==
1900	1930	1950	1970	1986	2009
214	198	159	21	23	30
