= La Nou de Berguedà =

- Municipality
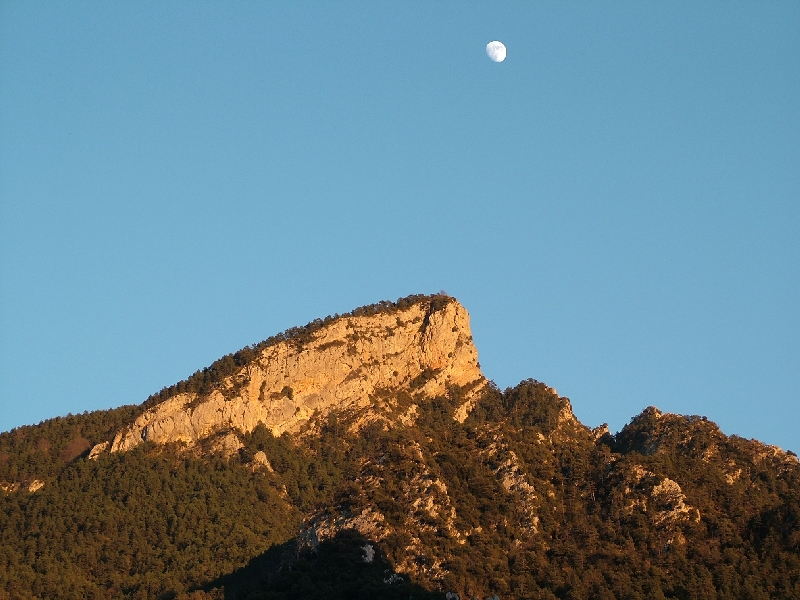
- Sobrepuny from La Nou

- Coat of arms

- Location in Catalonia La Nou de Berguedà (Spain)
- Coordinates: 42°10′04″N 1°53′10″E
- Country: Spain
- Community: Catalonia
- Province: Barcelona
- Comarca: Berguedà

Government
  - Mayor: Eleuter Adelantado Guitart (2015) (CP)

Area
  - Total: 25.0 km^{2} (9.7 sq mi)
- Elevation: 876 m (2,874 ft)

Population (2025-01-01)
  - Total: 163
  - Density: 6.52/km^{2} (16.9/sq mi)
- Demonym(s): Nouetà, Nouetana
- Website: www.lanoudebergueda.cat

La Nou de Berguedà (Catalan pronunciation: [lə ˈnɔw ðə βəɾɣəˈða]) is a municipality in the comarca of Berguedà, Catalonia. Located on the left bank of the Llobregat River, it is most noted as a destination for outdoor activities. In particular, the mountain of Sobrepuny is a popular hiking destination.

== History ==
The town is first recorded as a place name in 948, and is also recorded as having had part of its territory ceded to the Monastery of Ripoll in 1003.

== Places of interest ==
- Mountain of Sobrepuny
- Roca de Lliri
- Sanctuary of Lourdes de La Nou, neoclassical, from the 19th century.
