= Bagà =

- Municipality
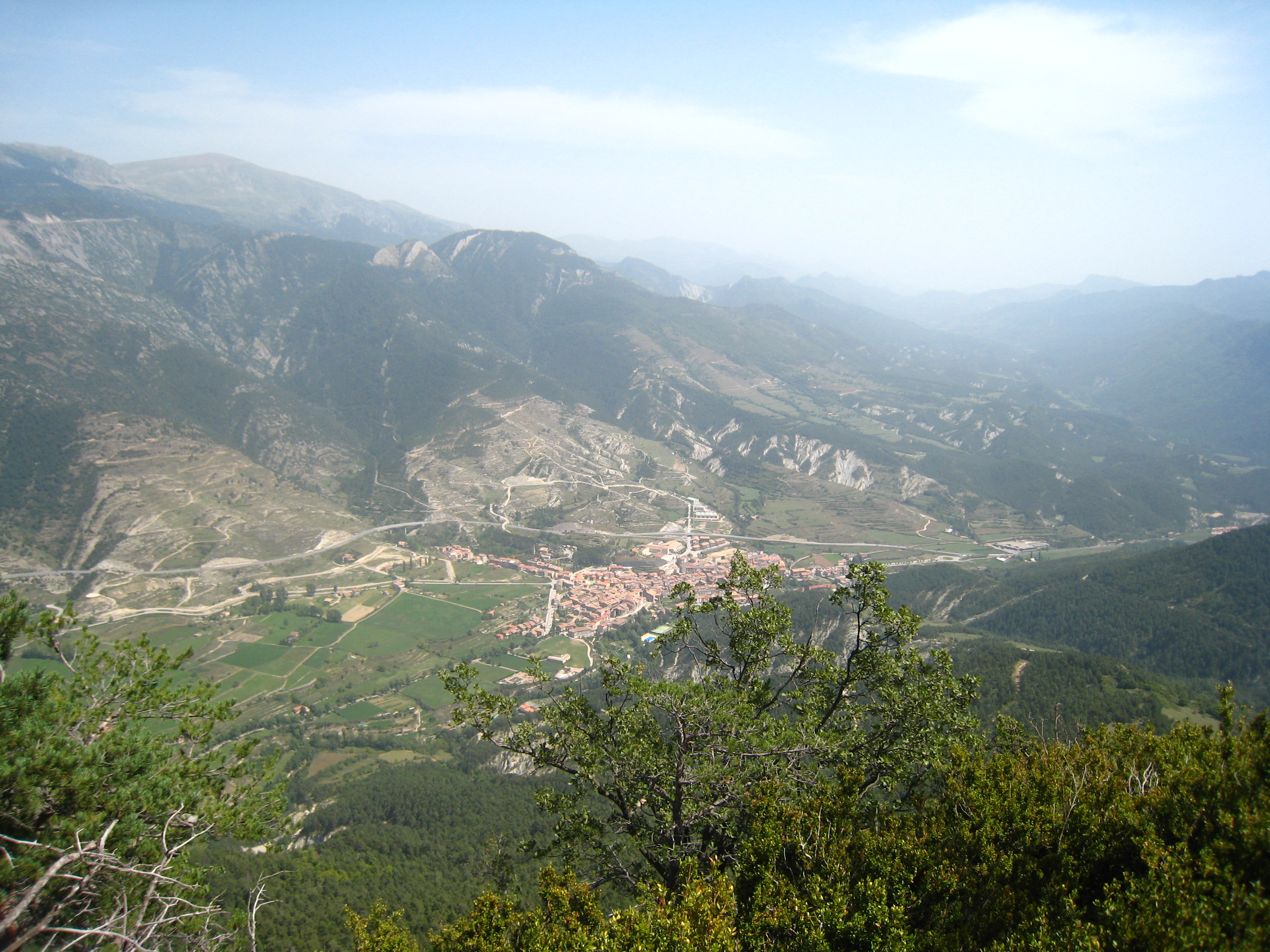
- View from the Tirabal Rock

- Coat of arms

- Map showing location within Catalonia

- Location in Catalonia
- Coordinates: 42°15′17″N 1°51′49″E
- Country: Spain
- Autonomous community: Catalonia
- Province: Barcelona
- Comarca: Berguedà

Government
  - Mayor: Nicolás Viso Alamillos (2015) (PSC)

Area
  - Total: 43.1 km^{2} (16.6 sq mi)
- Elevation: 785 m (2,575 ft)

Population (2025-01-01)
  - Total: 2,161
  - Density: 50.1/km^{2} (130/sq mi)
  - Demonym: Baganès baganesa
- Postal code: 08695
- Website: baga.cat

Bagà (Catalan pronunciation: [bəˈɣa]) is a Spanish municipality located in the comarca of Berguedà, in Catalonia.

Traditionally, Bagà is considered the capital of Alt Berguedà, the mountainous northern half of the comarca.

== Location ==
Bagà is located at the head of the valley of the Llobregat river, at the feet of the high mountains of the Cadí range. The town itself is at 785 metres above sea level.

Bagà is 20 kilometers to the north of Berga, and 7.5 kilometers to the south of the Túnel del Cadí, a tunnel which crosses the Cadí range, connecting with the region of la Cerdanya.

The municipality includes a small exclave to the west.

== History ==
Bagà was founded in the 9th century A.D. when the region of Berguedà was repopulated by Wilfred the Hairy. The noble family of Pinós dominated most of Alt Berguedà throughout most of the Middle Ages and administered its domains from the town of Bagà, giving the town some importance.

The town was redesigned in the 13th century by Galceran IV de Pinós, and is a rare example of medieval city planning. The town grew rapidly and by the beginning of the 14th century a new neighbourhood had to be built outside the town's walls to accommodate its growing population. Bagà was also granted a weekly market (which continues to this day) consolidating its role as a regional capital.

As a curiosity, some medieval documents refer to a “Hugo of Bagà” being the founder of the Knights Templar, though this is uncertain.

== Population ==
The population of Bagà has increased in recent years primarily due to an influx of people from the smaller towns surrounding it.

Population demographics
1900	1930	1950	1970	1981	1986	2006
800	1,021	1,275	2,388	2,130	2,154	2,178

== Economy ==
The economy of Bagà once centered on the textile industry and mining. These industries provided the basis for the economy in the 18th, 19th, and 20th centuries. Since the collapse of these industries, the region’s economy has focused on rural tourism, as well as winter sports tourists filtered from the nearby region of Cerdanya

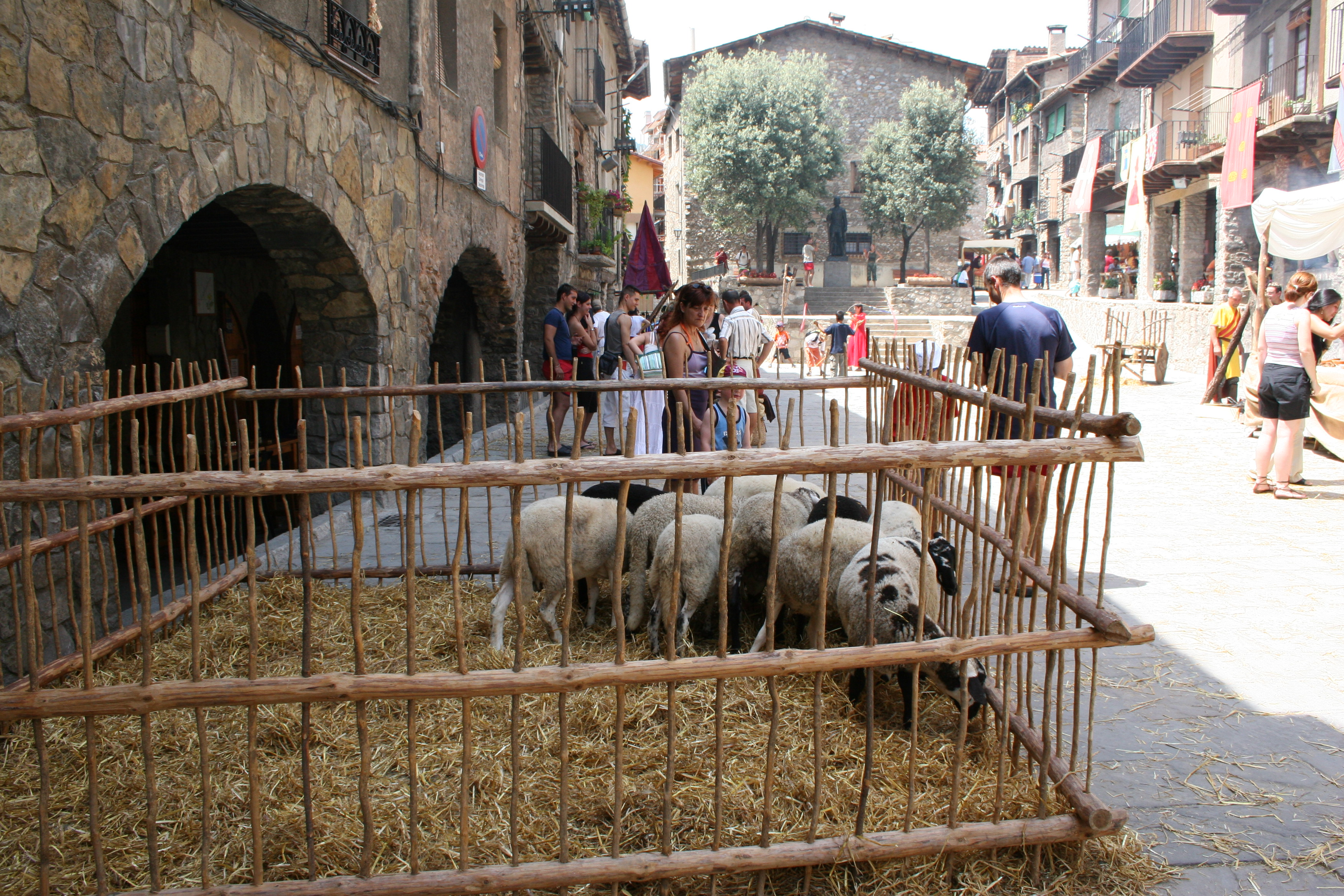
Plaza in Bagà

== The Fia-faia ==
The Fia-faia is a celebration of the winter solstice dating from pre-Christian times which takes place in Bagà every Christmas Eve. A bonfire is set in the mountains to the west of the town, where the sun sets. After dark, inhabitants of the town set faies, or bundles of Cephalaria leucanta alight and carry them from the bonfire to the central square of the town, where they are left on the ground. Children then jump over the fires, singing “Fia-faia, Fia-faia, que nostro senyor ha nascut a la palla”, or ‘Fia-faia, for our Lord is born in the hay’. Afterwards, bread is toasted over the fires and eaten with all i oli or quince paste.

== Sites of interest ==
- St. Esteve de Bagà is the parish church of the town, built between the 14th and 15th centuries.
- Santuari de la Mare de Déu del Paller is a neoclassical sanctuary two km outside town, dedicated to the town's patroness, the “Virgin of the Haystack”
- Plaça Porxada, the town's central square, built in the 13th century
