= Pedraforca =

Mountain in Catalonia, Spain

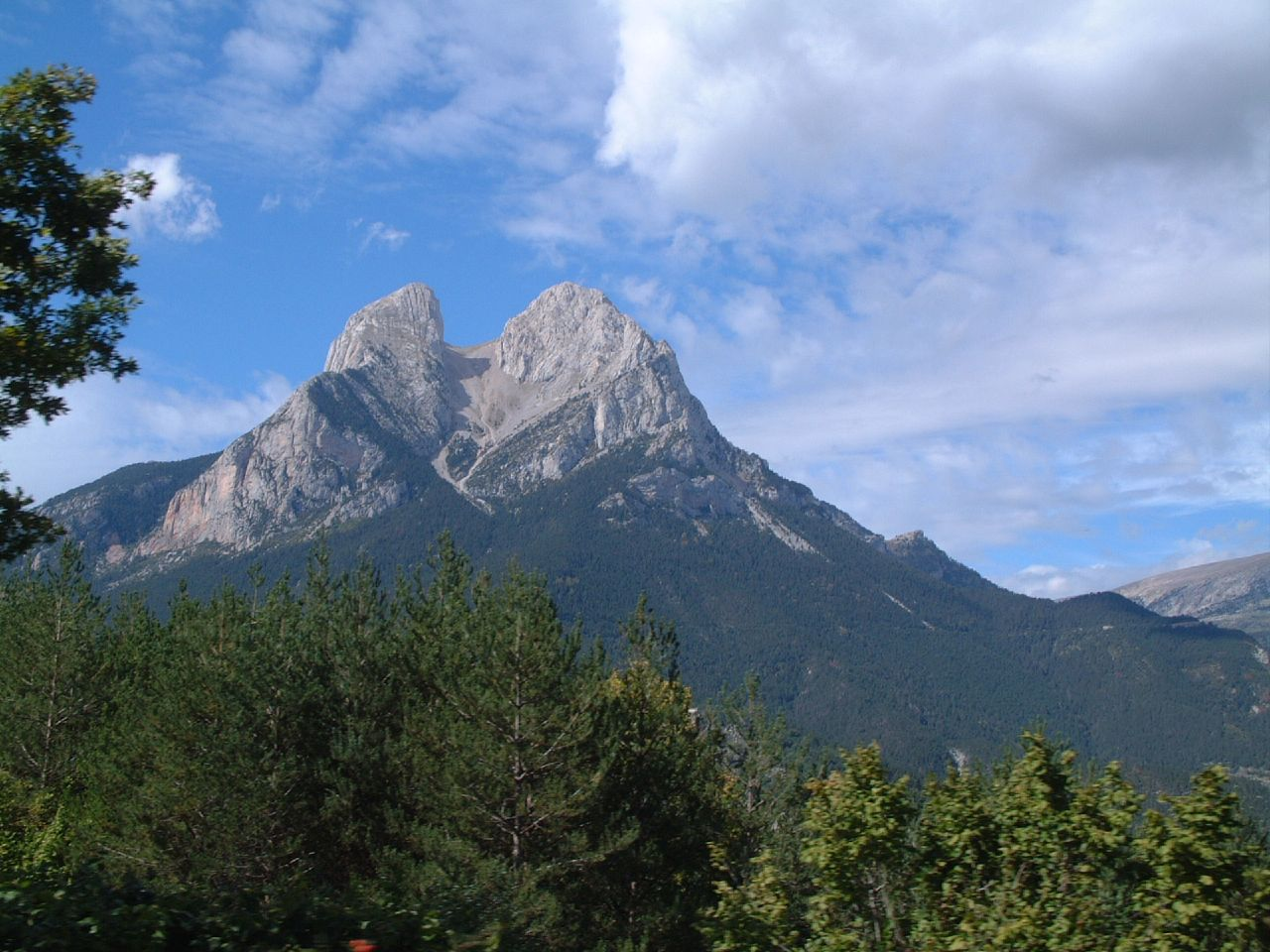
- The name of Pedraforca alludes to its forked shape

Highest point
- Elevation: 2,506.4 m (8,223 ft)
- Coordinates: 42°14′13″N 1°41′49″E

Naming
- English translation: Stone Pitchfork
- Language of name: Catalan

Geography
- Location: Berguedà, Catalonia
- Parent range: Pyrenees

Climbing
- Easiest route: Climb

Pedraforca (Catalan: [peðɾəˈfɔrkə]; Spanish: [peðɾaˈfoɾka]) is a mountain in the Pre-Pyrenees, located in the comarca of Berguedà. The mountain's rare form, along with the fact that it is not visibly connected to any other adjacent mountains or ridges, has made it one of the most famous and emblematic mountains in Catalonia, the northeasternmost region of Spain.

== Description ==
Panoramic view of Pollegó superior

The mountain has a peculiar, forked shape composed of two parallel peaks (the pollegons) joined by a neck (the enforcadura). The loftier peak, called Pollegó superior, has an elevation of 2,506.4 m, with a secondary peak, el Calderer, at 2,496.4 m in height. The lower peak, the Pollegó inferior is 2,444.8 m tall, while the Enforcadura's highest point lies at 2,356.2 m, with a scree field (tartera in Catalan) on both faces of the mountain.

== Location ==
Located within the Cadí-Moixeró Natural Park, Pedraforca has been declared a Natural Site of National Interest by the Generalitat de Catalunya.

The closest villages to Pedraforca are Gósol to the west and Saldes to the east. Pedraforca marks the boundary between the two municipalities, as well as between the provinces of Barcelona and Lleida.

== Significance ==
Coat of Arms of Berguedà, featuring the mountain's forked peaks

Pedraforca is, along with the mountains of Montserrat and Canigó, one of the emblematic mountains of Catalonia. This fame has made Pedraforca a popular destination for hikers and rock climbers, as well as being used by the comarca of Berguedà in its coat of arms.
