= Berguedà =

Coordinates: 42.1069°N 1.83833°E

- Comarca
- Flag Coat of arms

- Country: Spain
- Autonomous community: Catalonia
- Province: Barcelona, Lleida (Gósol)
- Region: Central Catalonia
- Capital: Berga
- Municipalities: List: Avià, Bagà, Berga, Borredà, Capolat, Casserres, Castell de l'Areny, Castellar de n'Hug, Castellar del Riu, Cercs, L'Espunyola, Fígols, Gironella, Gisclareny, Guardiola de Berguedà, Gósol, Montclar, Montmajor, La Nou de Berguedà, Olvan, La Pobla de Lillet, Puig-reig, La Quar, Sagàs, Saldes, Sant Jaume de Frontanyà, Sant Julià de Cerdanyola, Santa Maria de Merlès, Vallcebre, Vilada, Viver i Serrateix

Government
  - Body: Berguedà Comarcal Council
  - President: Ramon Caballé (Junts) (2023-2025); Moisès Masanas (ERC) (2025-2027)

Area
  - Total: 1,185.3 km^{2} (457.6 sq mi)

Population (2014)
  - Total: 40,039
  - Density: 33.780/km^{2} (87.489/sq mi)
- Demonym
- Time zone: UTC+1 (CET)
  - Summer (DST): UTC+2 (CEST)
- Largest municipality: Berga
- Website: www.bergueda.cat

Berguedà (Catalan pronunciation: [bəɾɣəˈða]) is an inland comarca in the central region of Catalonia, Spain. It lies partly in the Pyrenees and Pre-Pyrenees, and partly in the Catalan Central Depression. The capital is the city of Berga.

== Geography ==
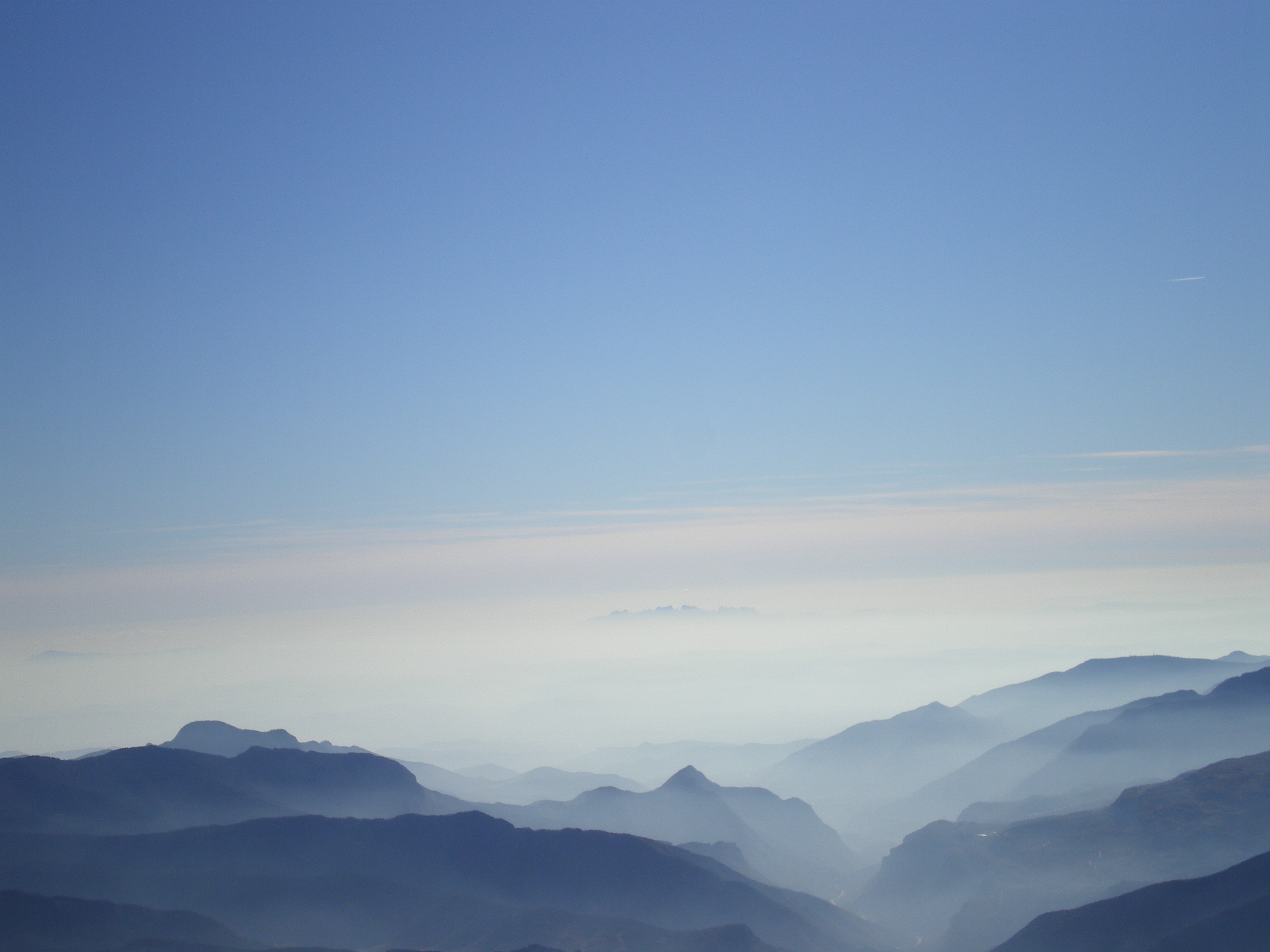
Llobregat valley in Alt Berguedà

The northern half of Berguedà, known as Alt Berguedà (“Upper Berguedà”), consists of the upper Llobregat Valley and the mountainous areas surrounding it. Its northern border is a veritable mountain barrier: Berguedà is separated from Cerdanya by a chain of 2,000-meter peaks. These include the mountain ranges of Cadí, Moixeró, Puig d'Alp and Puigllançada. In this area the population is centered mainly in the Llobregat Valley and the valleys of the rivers Bagà, Bastareny and Saldes. To the east are the mountain ranges of Catllaràs and Rasos de Tubau, to the west the high ranges of Pedraforca, Verd, Ensija and Rasos de Peguera.

The more populous Baix Berguedà ("Lower Berguedà") is the southern part of the comarca. It lies along the foothills of the Pyrenees, transitioning into the plains of the Catalan Central Depression. In addition to towns of medieval origin such as Gironella, Casserres, or Puig-reig, it includes a large number of industrial colonies built along the Llobregat river after the Industrial Revolution.

== Climate ==
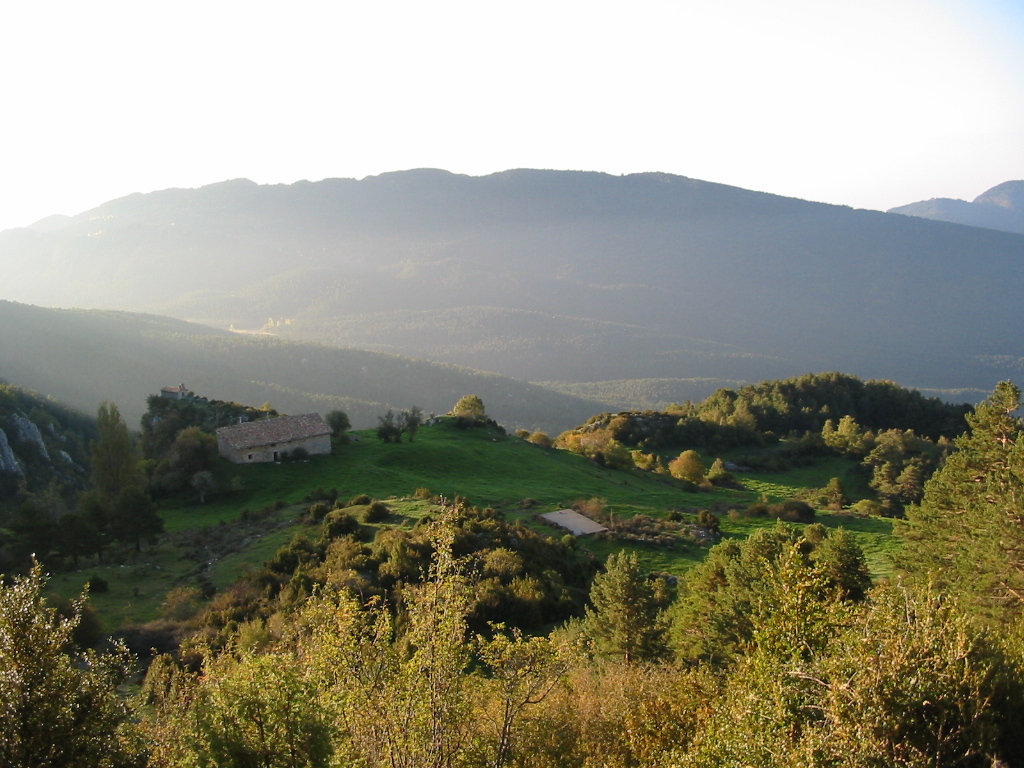
Rasos de Peguera in Berguedà.

Alt Berguedà is rainy and (by Catalan standards) cold, with snow in the winter on the higher peaks. Average annual precipitation exceeds 1000 mm (40 inches), mostly in the warmer seasons.

The vegetation consists mainly of forests of Scots pine and oak. Shadier areas have European beech and, less often, silver fir. Above 1700 meters, Mountain Pine dominates and above 2200 meters the vegetation consists primarily of alpine meadows. The southern half of Berguedà consists of lower valleys, with a dry Mediterranean climate. Average annual precipitation is 700 to 900 mm (28 to 36 inches), with very little precipitation in the summer. Average annual temperatures fall between 11 and 13 °C, with cold winters, but without excessively hot summers. The naturally occurring vegetation is carrascara (round-leafed oak, Quercus ilex subsp. rotundifolia) in dry areas with poor soil and oaks where there is better soil and more rain. In the center and to the west, Portuguese oak (Quercus faginea) dominates, to the west and north downy oak (Quercus pubescens, syn. Q. humilis). Nowadays, these are intermixed with Scots pine and Aleppo pine.

== Population and economy ==
Berguedà has always been sparsely populated. In 1860 there were 31,544 inhabitants, but by 1887 the population had fallen to a low of 23,257. The 1900 census showed a slight rebound to 27,217 inhabitants. For the next 60 years, growing opportunities in mining, textiles, forestry, cattle ranching, and agriculture led to a slow but steady increase, with 39,600 inhabitants in 1930, 41,938 in 1950 and 47,953 in 1960. Then, with a decline in the local economy (especially a fall-off in mining) coinciding with greater opportunity elsewhere, another decline of the economy and population set in, with the population falling to 44,446 in 1970, 42,152 in 1981, and a mere 40,555 today.

Currently, industrial activity is located mainly in between Berga and Puig-reig. The opening of the Cadí Tunnel and the general improvement of the roads in recent (as of 2004) years may improve the economic potential of the Llobregat Valley and of Berguedà in general.

Agriculture, cattle ranching and forestry have proven generally complementary to one another and compatible with tourism. The growth in tourism has provided some jobs and has been a key factor in reducing emigration from Alt Berguedà. Many farmhouses have been converted (in whole or in part) to tourism-related uses.

The current Berguedà population as of 2019 is 44,632 people.

== Main sights ==
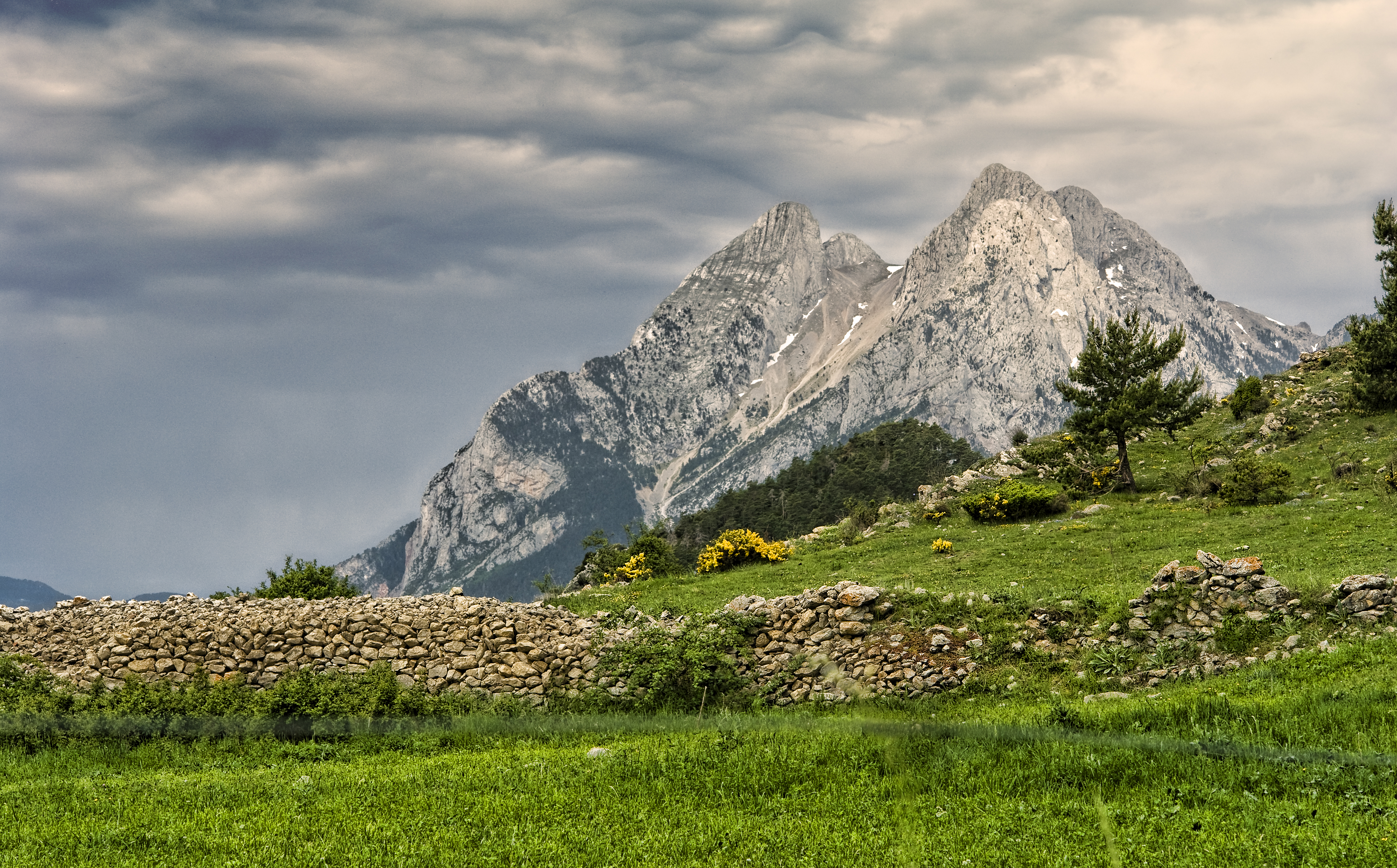
Pedraforca

Berguedà is well known for Pedraforca Mountain (traditionally considered a meeting place for witches' covens), for its pastoral and mountain scenery, and for its many Romanesque churches. Another oft-visited sight is the Mountain of Queralt (home to a sanctuary housing the Comarca's patroness, Our Lady of Queralt), which is served by many hiking trails and offers views of much of Berguedà and the surrounding comarques. The comarca also boasts many medieval bridges and has preserved many old town centers, most notably those of Berga and Bagà.

== Events ==
Berguedà is well known for its many traditional festivals. The most famous is certainly the Patum, a week-long celebration held in Berga every summer. During the Patum, representations of different mythological beasts and historical figures take to the streets, and concerts and banquets are also organized in the town. Another well-known celebration is the Fia-faia, held every Christmas Eve in Bagà and Sant Julià de Cerdanyola. This pre-Christian tradition marks the winter solstice, with participants carrying lighted bundles of Cephalaria leucanta from a bonfire in the mountains to the west of either town (where the sun is seen to set) to the main square.

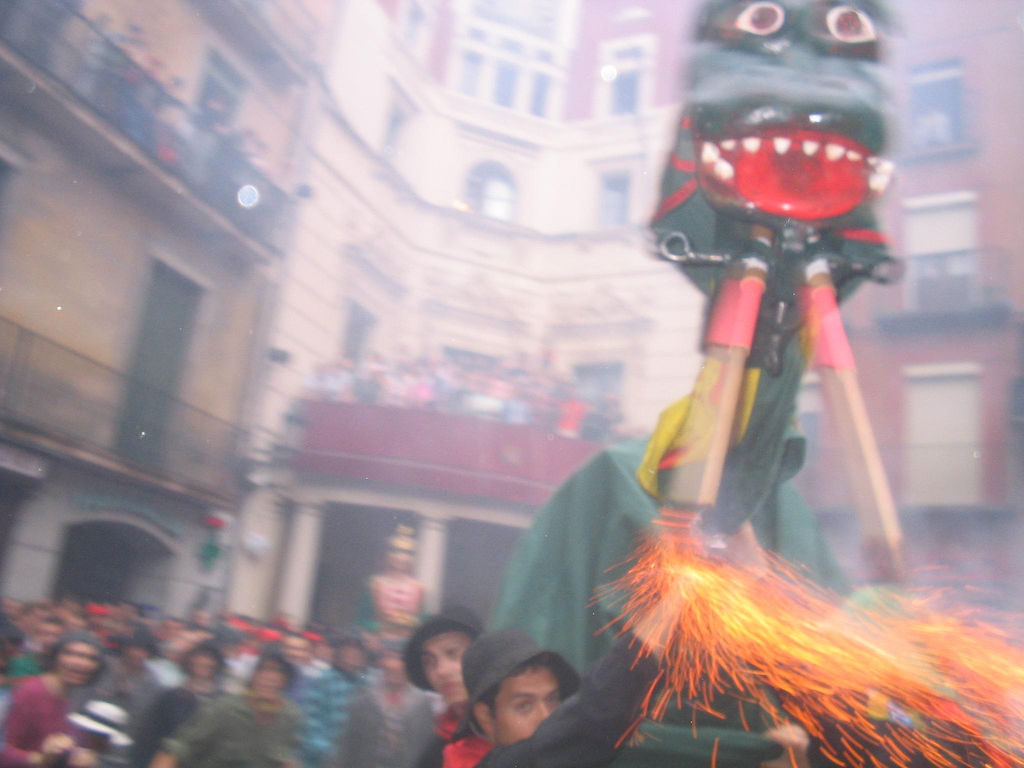
The Patum de Berga

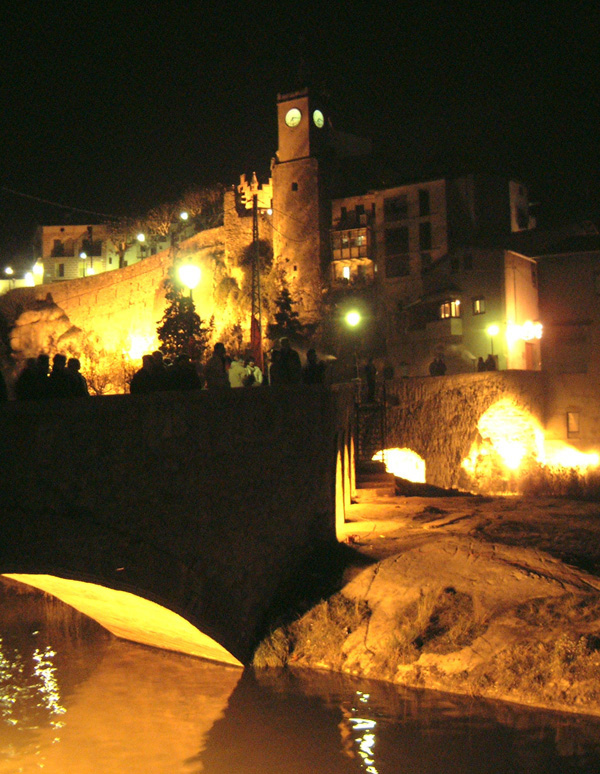
The town of Gironella

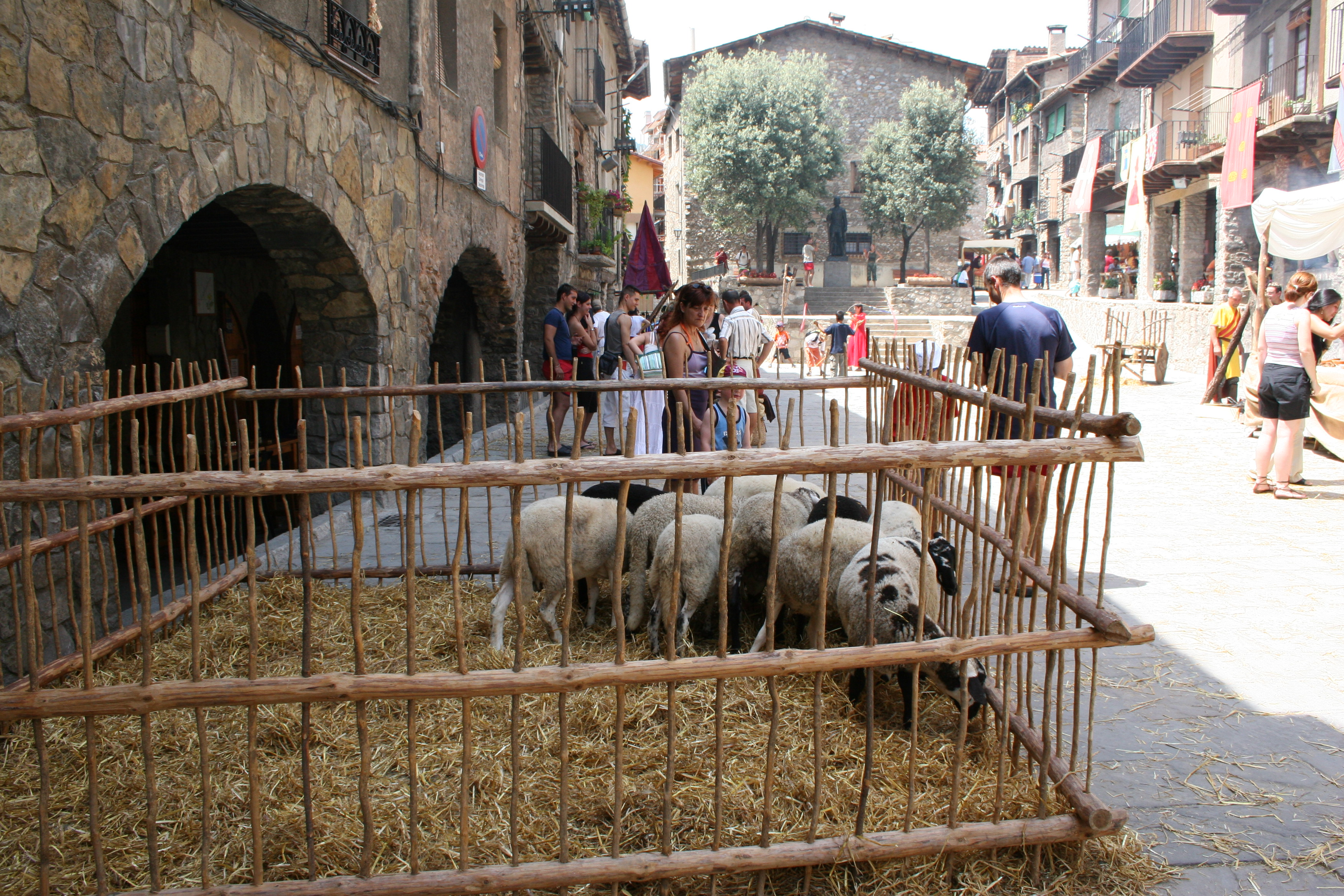
Medieval week in Bagà

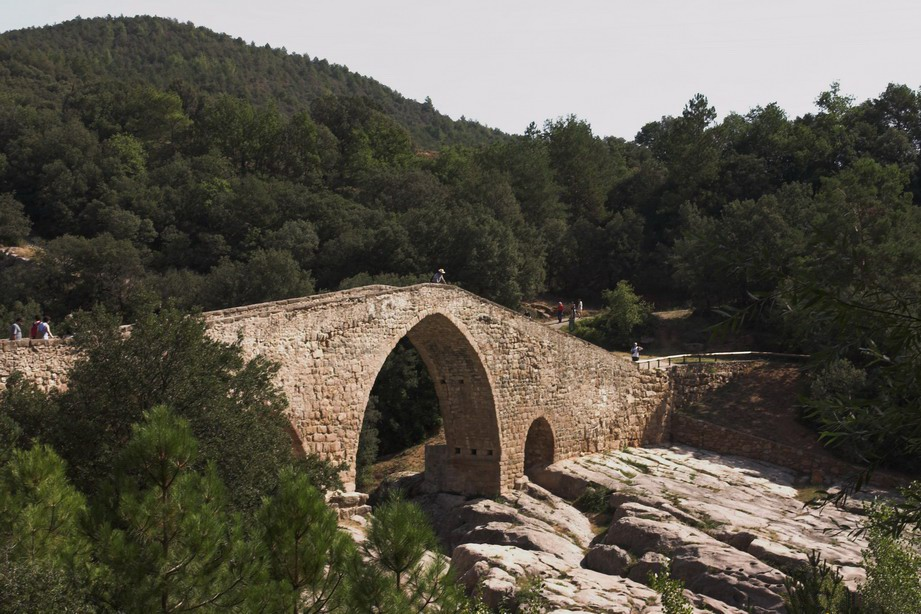
Medieval bridge of Pedret

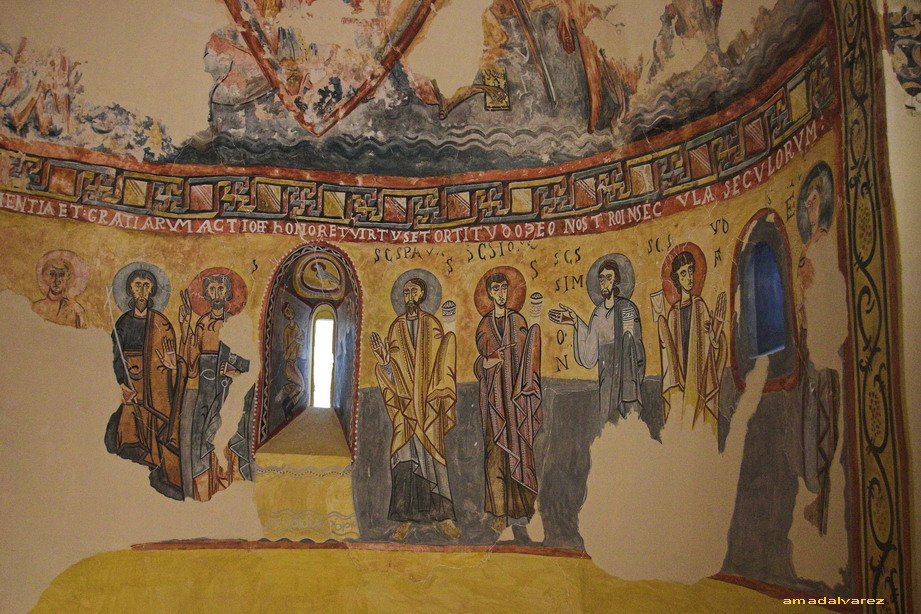
Paintings in the Romanesque church of Sant Vicenç de Rus

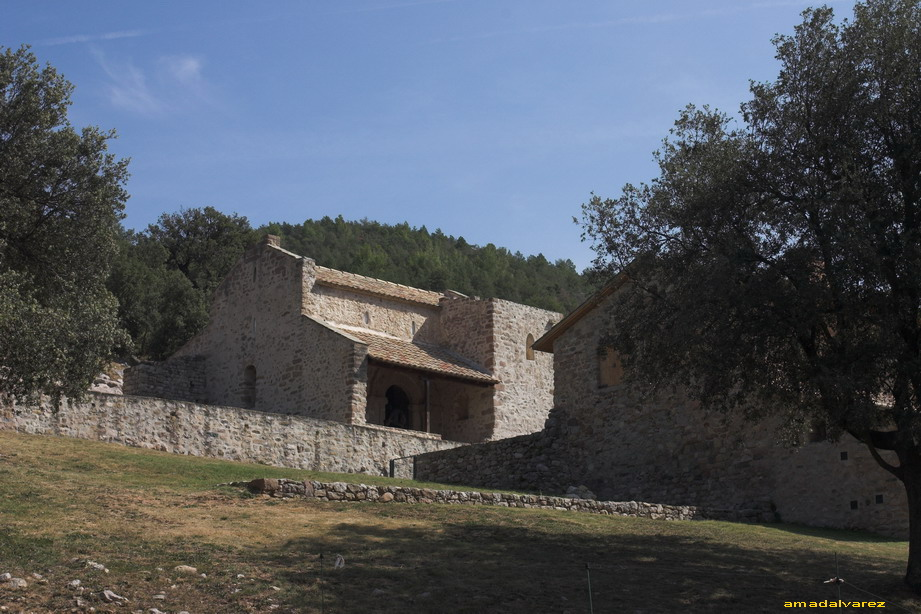
Romanesque church of Sant Quirze de Pedret

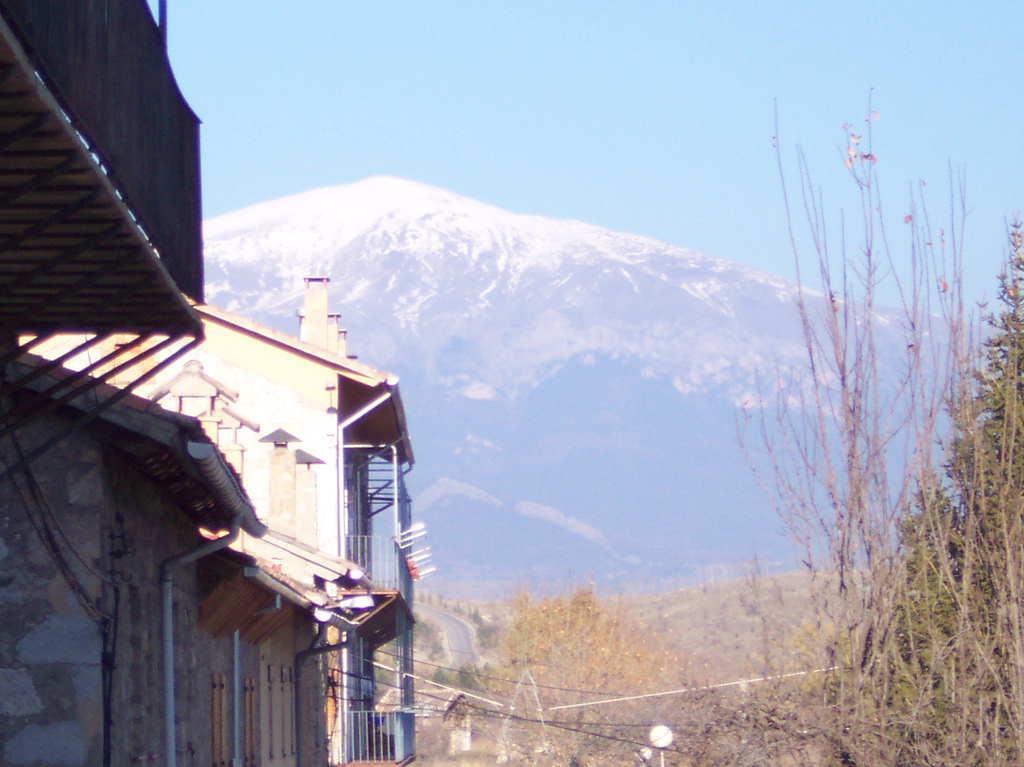
The town of Cercs

== Municipalities ==
Municipality	Population (2014)	Area km^{2}
Avià	2,258	27.2
Bagà	2,225	43.1
Berga	16,456	22.6
Borredà	540	43.4
Capolat	88	34.1
Casserres	1,569	29.5
Castell de l'Areny	75	24.4
Castellar de n'Hug	159	47.1
Castellar del Riu	171	32.7
Cercs	1,246	47.4
L'Espunyola	259	35.5
Fígols	43	29.3
Gironella	4,987	6.8
Gisclareny	25	36.5
Gósol	216	56.3
Guardiola de Berguedà	937	61.7
Montclar	117	21.9
Montmajor	476	76.5
La Nou de Berguedà	150	25.0
Olvan	876	35.6
La Pobla de Lillet	1,155	51.4
Puig-reig	4,207	45.8
La Quar	57	38.2
Sagàs	149	44.6
Saldes	283	66.4
Sant Jaume de Frontanyà	24	21.3
Sant Julià de Cerdanyola	239	11.8
Santa Maria de Merlès	177	52.1
Vallcebre	258	28.0
Vilada	443	22.3
Viver i Serrateix	174	66.8
• Total: 31	40,039	1,185.3
