= L'Espunyola =

- Municipality
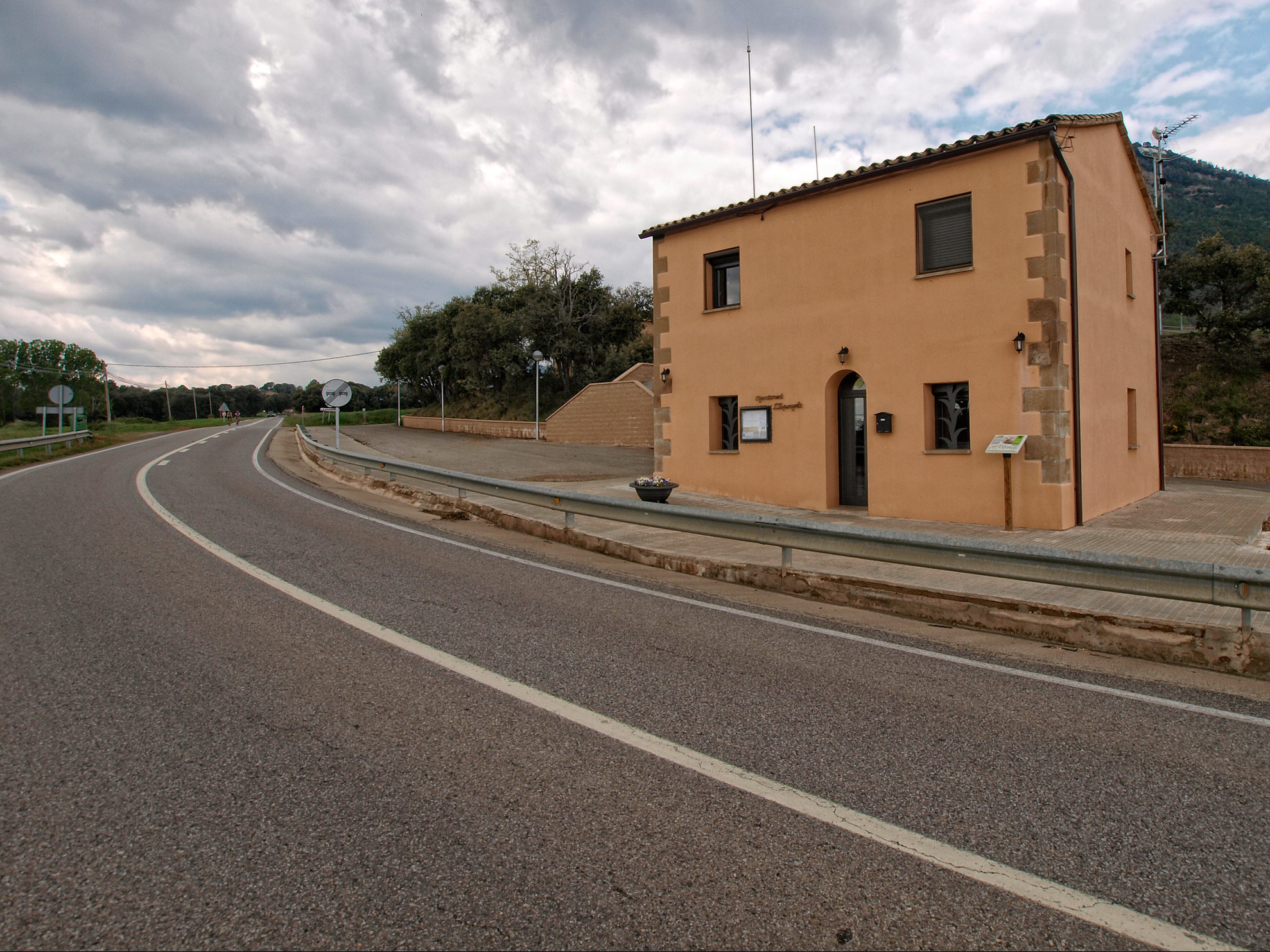
- Espunyola town hall

- Coat of arms

- Location in Catalonia L'Espunyola (Spain)
- Coordinates: 42°03′17″N 1°46′15″E
- Country: Spain
- Community: Catalonia
- Province: Barcelona
- Comarca: Berguedà

Government
  - Mayor: Rudy Gelinne (2015) (ERC-AM)

Area
  - Total: 35.5 km^{2} (13.7 sq mi)
- Elevation: 804 m (2,638 ft)

Population (2025-01-01)
  - Total: 260
  - Density: 7.3/km^{2} (19/sq mi)
- Demonym(s): Espunyolenc, Espunyolenca
- Website: espunyola.cat

L'Espunyola (Catalan pronunciation: [ləspuˈɲɔlə]) is a municipality located in the southwest of the comarca of Berguedà, Catalonia. Prior to 1983 it was known simply as "Espunyola," without an article. The municipality includes a small exclave to the west.

== Sites of interest ==
- Castle of L'Espunyola, from the 13th and 16th centuries.
- Church of Sant Climent, built in the 11–12th and 17–18th centuries.
