= Guardiola de Berguedà =

- Municipality
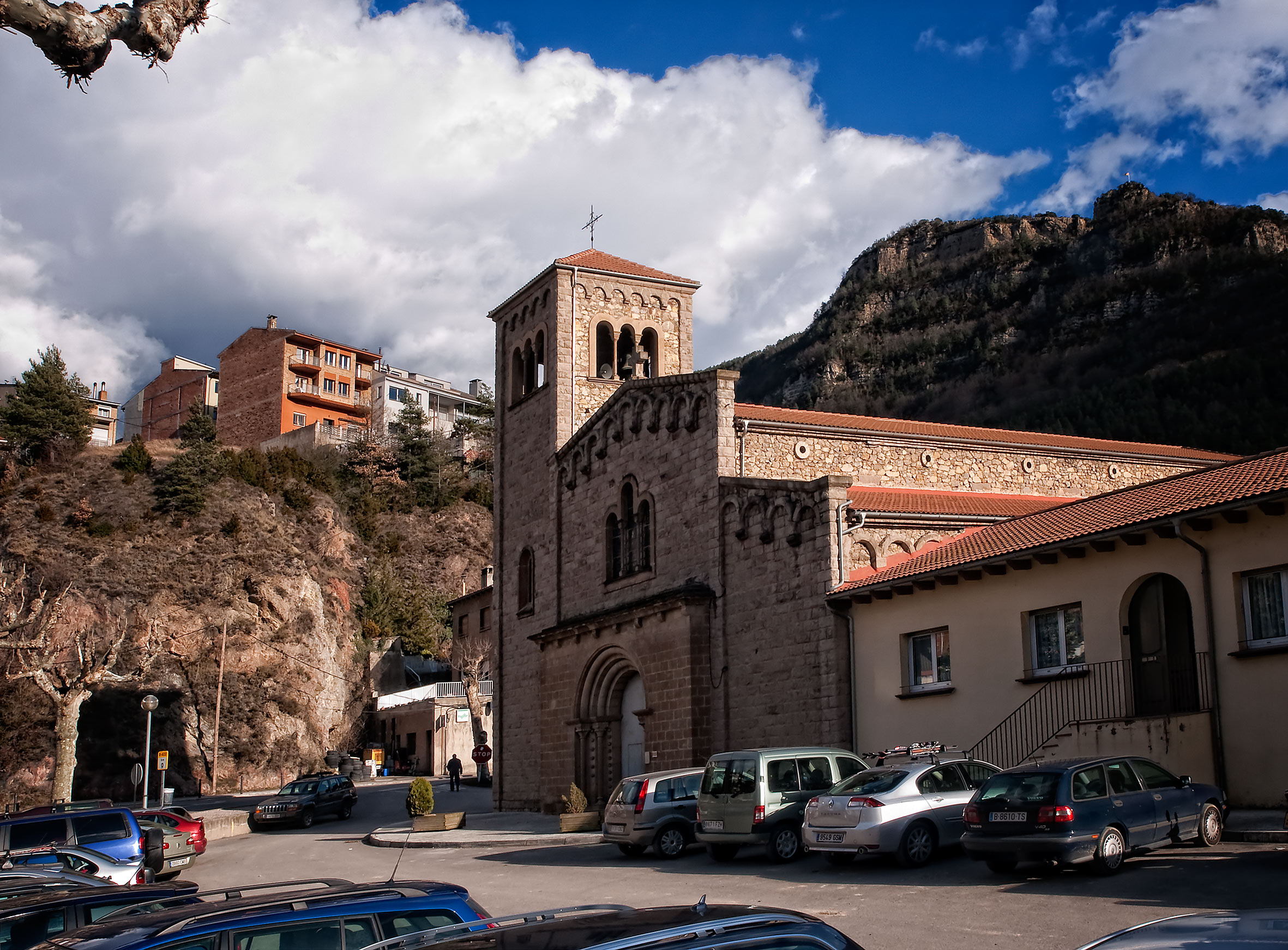
- St. Laurence's church, Guardiola

- Flag Coat of arms

- Location in Catalonia Guardiola de Berguedà (Spain)
- Coordinates: 42°14′6″N 1°52′52″E
- Country: Spain
- Community: Catalonia
- Province: Barcelona
- Comarca: Berguedà

Government
  - Mayor: Josep Pere Lara Tristante (2015) (CiU)

Area
  - Total: 61.7 km^{2} (23.8 sq mi)
- Elevation: 720 m (2,360 ft)

Population (2025-01-01)
  - Total: 1,020
  - Density: 16.5/km^{2} (42.8/sq mi)
- Demonym(s): Guardiolenc, guardiolenca
- Website: guardioladebergueda.net

Guardiola de Berguedà (Catalan pronunciation: [gwəɾðiˈɔlə ðə βəɾɣəˈða]) is a municipality in the comarca of the Berguedà in Catalonia. It is situated at the confluence of the Bastareny and Llobregat rivers in the north of the comarca. It is an important local commercial centre, and for this reason has been less affected by depopulation than other municipalities in the Berguedà. The extraction of lignite is also important to the local economy. The town is served by the C-1411 road from Berga to the Cadí tunnel, and is linked to La Pobla de Lillet and Castellar de n'Hug by the B-402 road. The municipality includes a large exclave to the north-west.

== Riutort asphalt mine ==
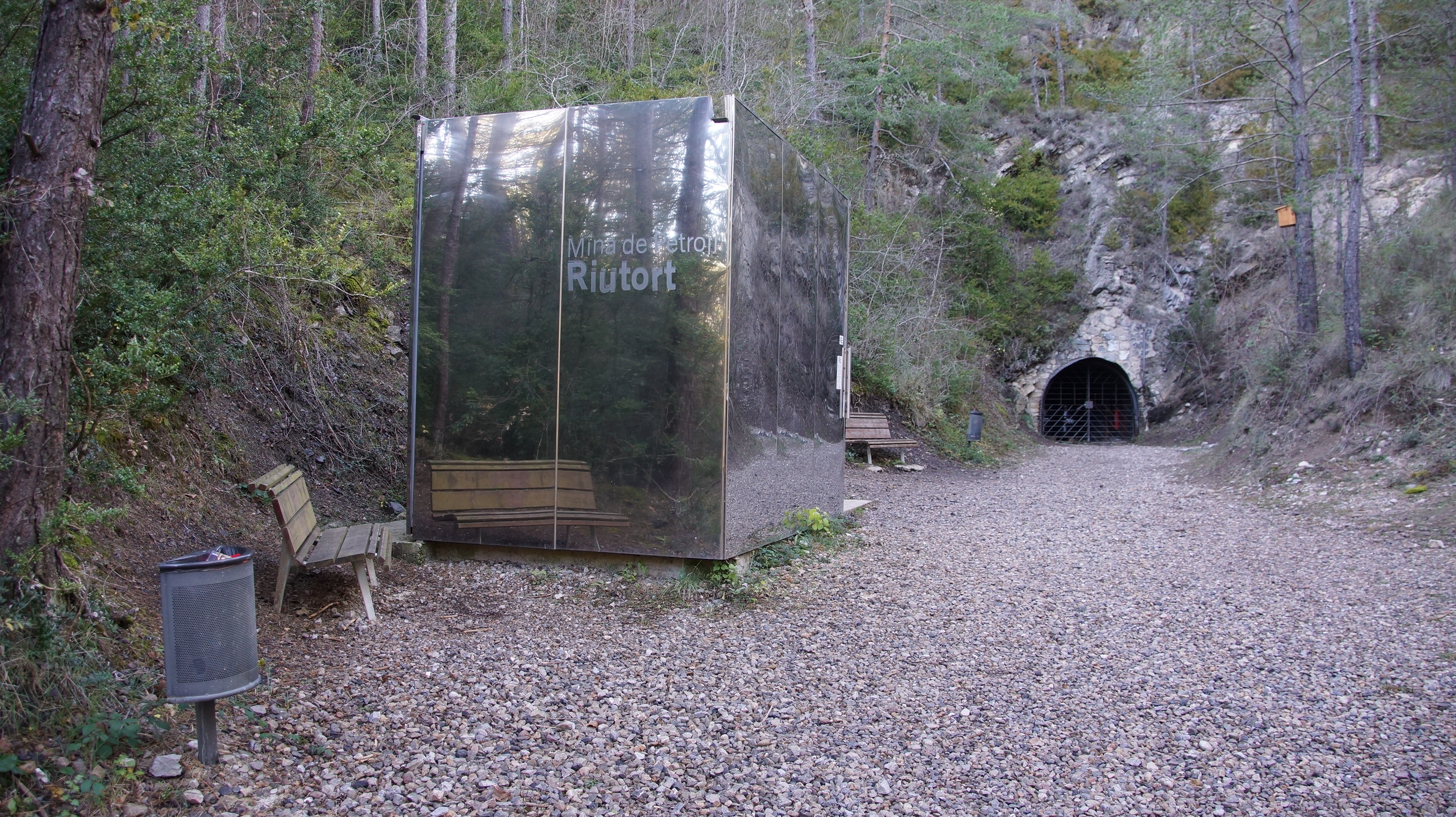
Mine entrance

At the beginning of the 20th century, the Riutort asphalt mine (42.252103°N 1.921634°E) was exploited by the Riutort Mining Company, which was owned by the Frenchmen Jules Claviez and Philipp Petit. They extracted bituminous loam and transported this on mules to the distillation factory, where petrol was extracted from the asphalt.

A few years after being set-up, the mine closed because of insufficient production. It is open to the public in guided groups, which descend approximately 340 metres into its depths, to see its extensive galleries, which still drip petroleum from the rock walls and experience the strong smell associated with fossil fuels. It is one of the few underground petroleum mines in the world, an exceptional historical curiosity from the industrial revolution in Berguedà. In order to preserve and protect its wealth of fauna (Pyrenean newts, salamanders and bats), some parts of the mining installations have been excluded from the tourist access.

== Demography ==
1900	1930	1950	1970	1986	2007
589	1336	1334	1848	1312	948
