= Cadí-Moixeró Natural Park =

Natural park in Catalonia, Spain

- Parc Natural del Cadí-Moixeró (in Catalan)
- IUCN category V (protected landscape/seascape)
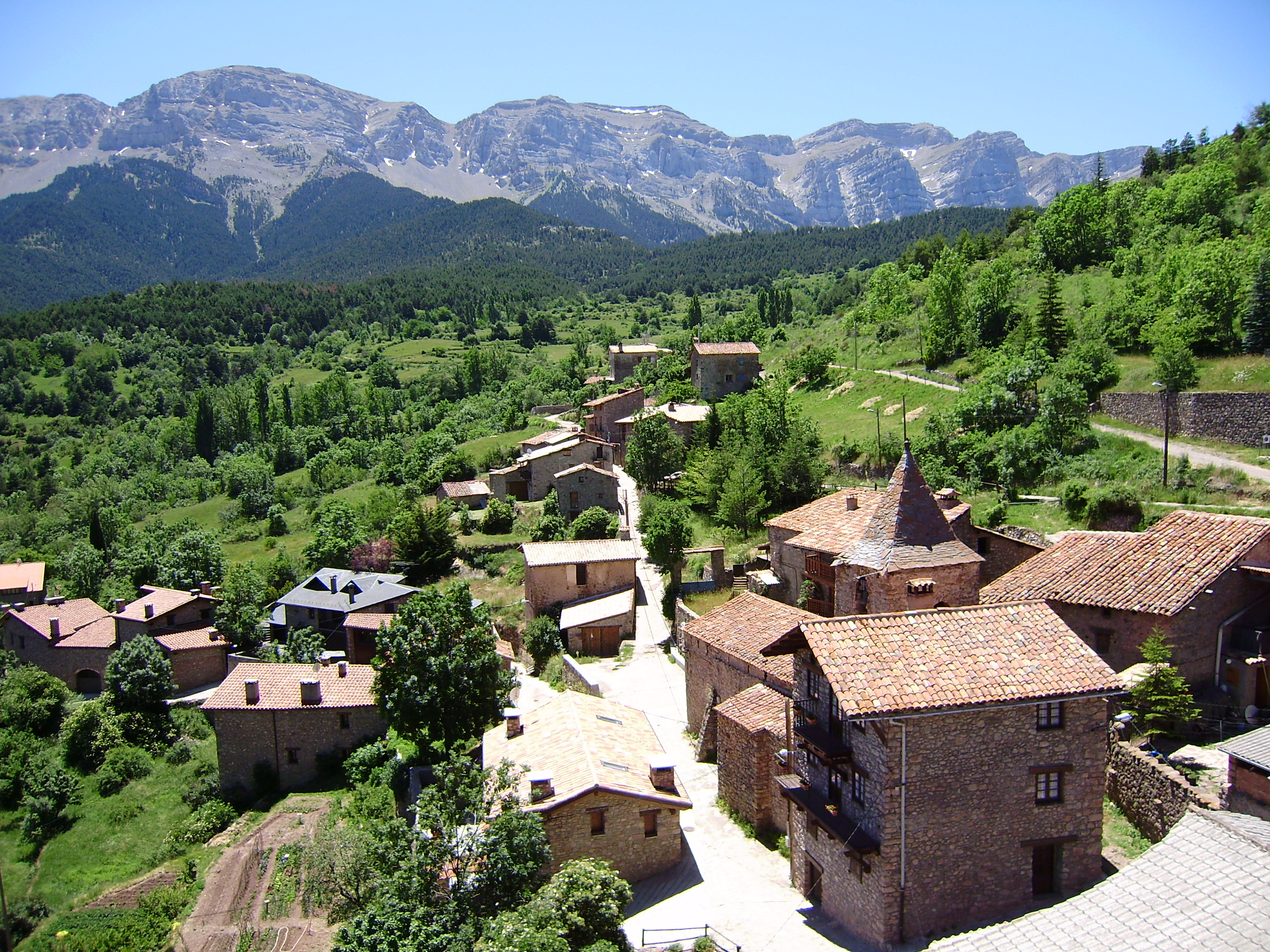
- The village of El Querforadat, Alt Urgell

- Location within Catalonia
- Location: Berguedà, Alt Urgell and Cerdanya in Catalonia, Spain
- Coordinates: 42°18′10″N 1°41′47″E
- Area: 41,060 hectares (410.6 km^{2})
- Established: 1983
- Governing body: Departament de Medi Ambient i Habitatge
- Website: www.gencat.cat/parcs/cadi

The Cadí-Moixeró Natural Park (Catalan: Parc Natural del Cadí-Moixeró) is a natural park to the north of Catalonia, Spain, near the border with Andorra. The park was established in 1983 and encompasses 41,060 hectares (101,500 acres) of mountainous terrain in the comarques of Alt Urgell, Berguedà and Cerdanya. It stretches for more than 30 kilometers over the mountain ranges of Serra del Cadí and Serra de Moixeró, with Vulturó standing at 2,648 metres (8,688 ft) as its highest point.
