= Puigllançada =

Coordinates: 42°18′02″N 1°59′08″E

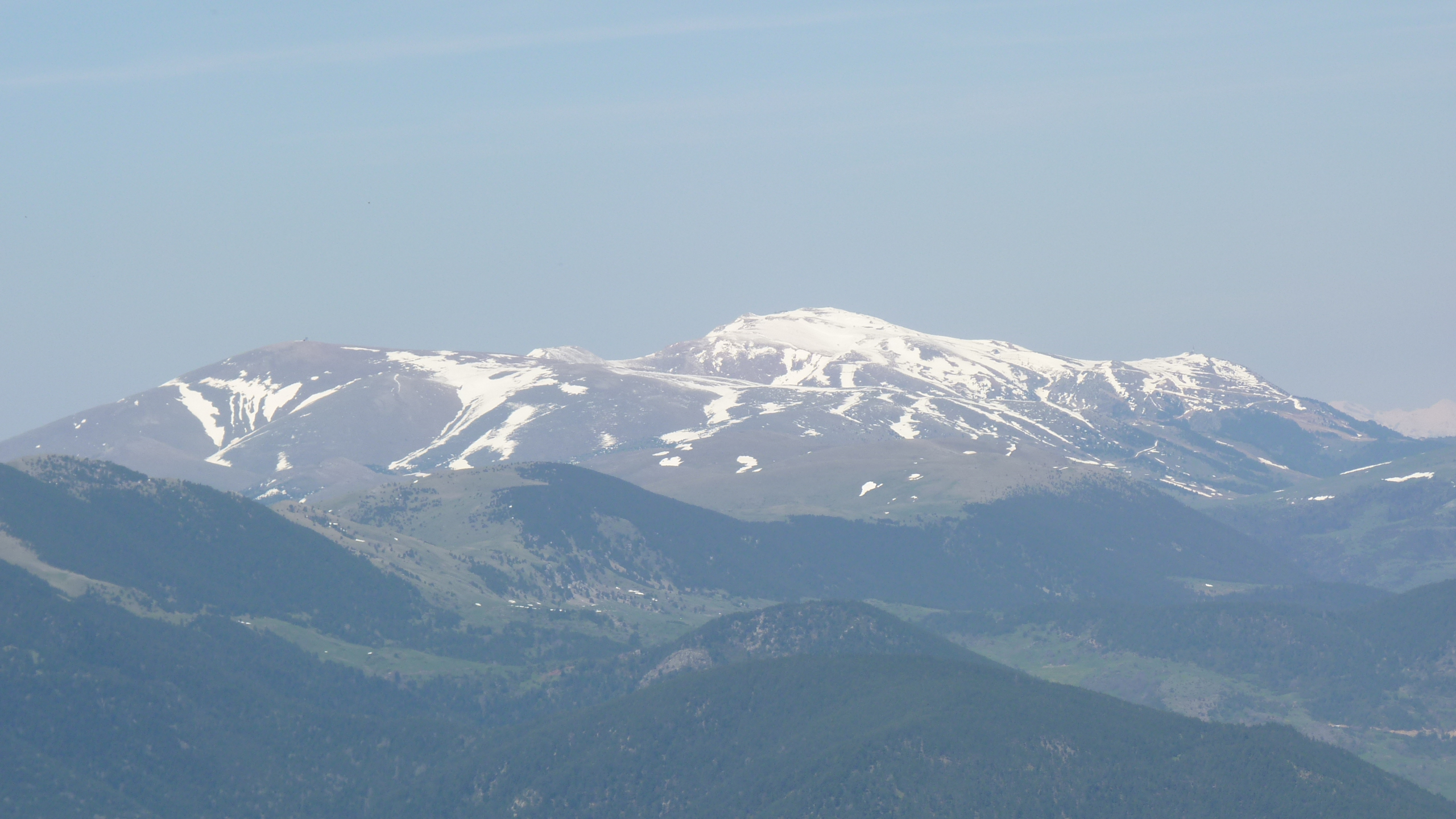
- Puigllançada among other mountain tops

Highest point
- Elevation: 2,409 m (7,904 ft)

Geography
- Location: Catalonia, Spain
- Parent range: Pyrenees

Puigllançada is a mountain of Catalonia, Spain. Located in the Pyrenees, it has an elevation of 2,409 metres above sea level.

== See also ==
- Mountains of Catalonia
