= Perello =

Perello, Perellos, or Perelló may refer to:

== People ==
- Andrés Perelló de Segurola (1874–1953), Spanish operatic bass
- Jaime Perelló (born 1973), Puerto Rican politician
- Joan Perelló (born 1993), Spanish motorcycle racer
- José Perelló Torrens (1885–1955), Spanish politician
- Justo Perelló (born 1939), Cuban javelin thrower
- Marcel·lí Perelló i Domingo (1897–1961), Spanish guerrilla politician
  - Marcelino Perelló Valls (1944–2017), Mexican student activist
- Melissa Perello (born 1976), American chef
- Raimundo Perellós, 15th-century nobleman of Aragon
- Ramon Perellos y Roccaful (1637–1720), Spanish Grand Master of the Order of Malta
- Rossend Perelló (1912–1976), Catalan writer

== Places ==
- El Perelló, a municipality in Baix Ebre, Catalonia, Spain
- El Perelló, a municipality in Ribera Baixa, Valencia Province, Spain
- Perellos Redoubt, a 1716 fortification in St. Paul's Bay, Malta
- Perellos Tower, the second Marsalforn Tower in Xagħra, Gozo, Malta

== See also ==
- Perella, a surname (including a list of people with that name)
- Opoul-Périllos, a commune in Pyrénées-Orientales, France
