= Cal Bassacs =

- Singular population entity
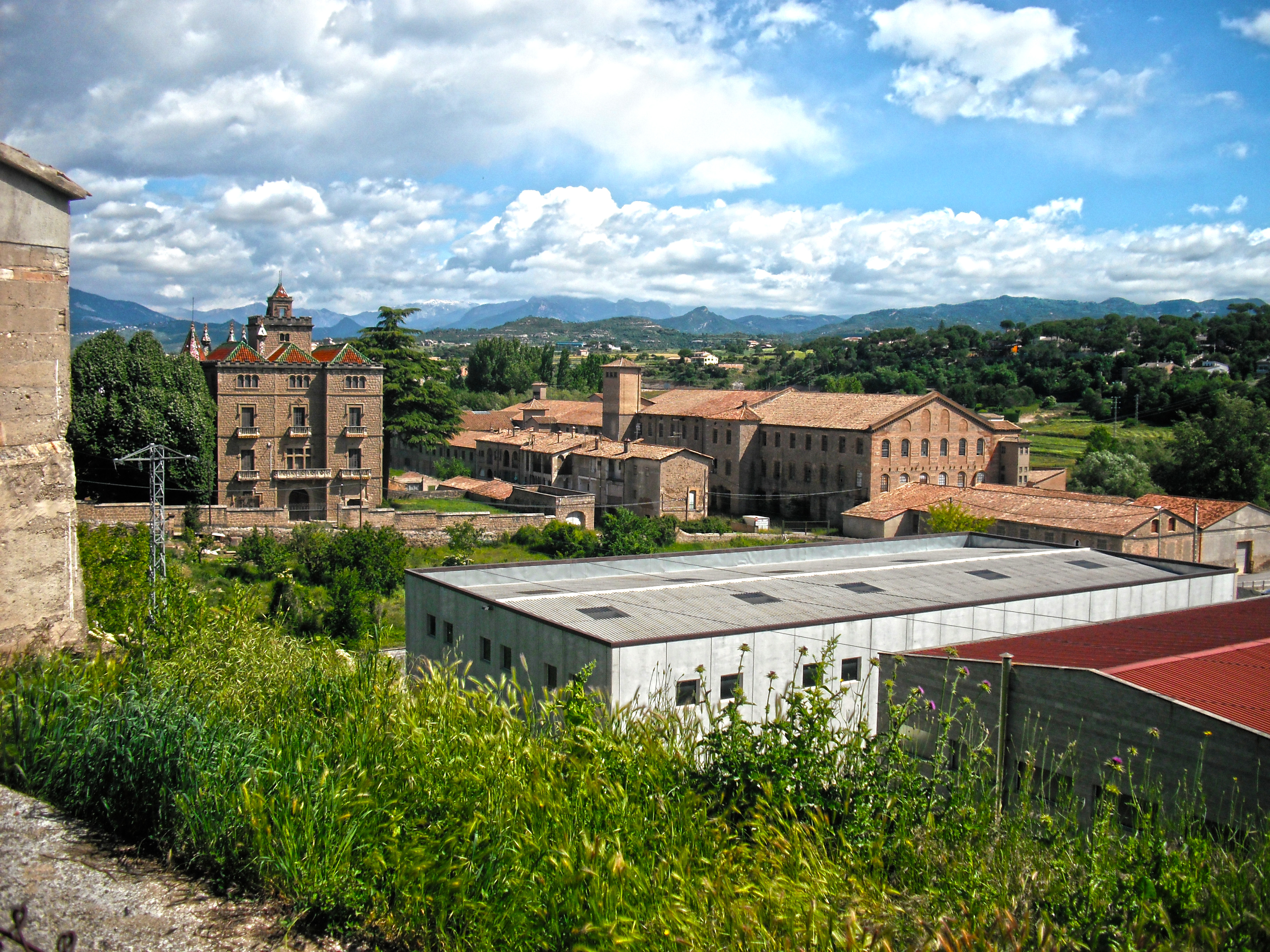
- View of Cal Bassacs

- Location within Spain Location within Catalonia Location within Province of Barcelona
- Coordinates: 42°01′20.2″N 1°53′02.6″E
- Country: Spain
- A. community: Catalunya
- Province: Barcelona
- Comarca: Berguedà
- Municipality: Gironella

Population (January 1, 2024)
  - Total: 1,149
- Time zone: UTC+01:00
- Postal code: 08680
- MCN: 08092000100

Cal Bassacs is a singular population entity in the municipality of Gironella, in Catalonia, Spain.

As of 2024 it has a population of 1,149 people.
