= Silence March =

Silence March can refer to:

- Silence March, in Mexico, 1968.
- Silent Parade, in United States, 1917.
