= Sagàs =

- Municipality
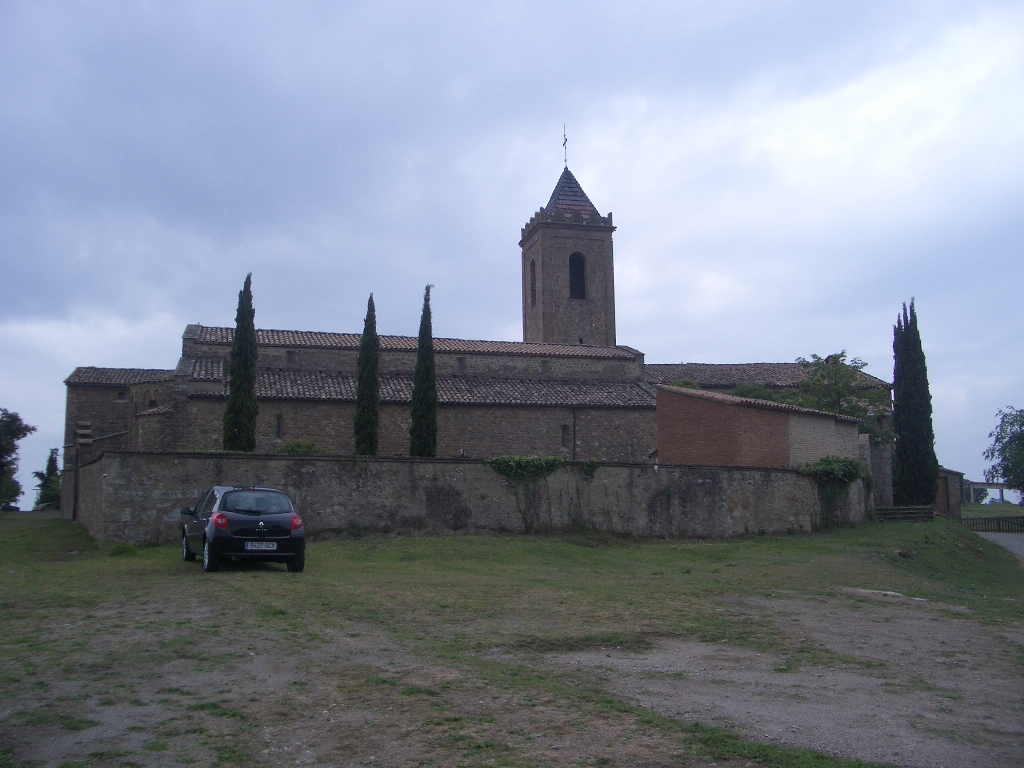
- Church of Sant Andreu.

- Coat of arms

- Location in Berguedà

- Location in Catalonia Sagàs (Spain)
- Coordinates: 42.038°N 1.972°E
- Country: Spain
- Community: Catalonia
- Province: Barcelona
- Comarca: Berguedà

Government
  - Mayor: Silvia Triola Costa (2015) (AES)

Area
  - Total: 44.6 km^{2} (17.2 sq mi)
- Elevation: 738 m (2,421 ft)

Population (2025-01-01)
  - Total: 154
  - Density: 3.45/km^{2} (8.94/sq mi)
- Demonym: Saganès
- Website: www.sagas.cat

Sagàs (Catalan pronunciation: [səˈɣas]) is a small town and municipality located in Catalonia, in the comarca of Berguedà. It is located in the geographical area of the Pre-Pyrenees.

== Population ==
Sagàs is essentially a collection of farmhouses, or masies, separated by low wooded ridges and cultivated fields. The municipality is made up of five separate villages (Sant Andreu de Sagàs, El Carrer de Bonaire, Biure de Berguedà, La Guàrdia de Sagàs, and Valloriola) and two parishes (Sant Andreu de Sagàs and Santa Maria de la Guàrdia). Traditionally, the people of Sagàs made their living from agriculture. While this is still true for most of the inhabitants of Sagàs, the increased mechanization of farming has led to a growth in rural tourism, as well as a drop in population—the town has a growth rate of negative 10.4 percent.

== Coat of arms ==
The blazon of the municipality's coat of arms is:

Gules, a saltire Or, overall a palm frond Vert proper; for a Crest, the mural crown of a village.

The arms were approved on June 2, 2026, and it was officially adopted when it was published in the Diari Oficial de la Generalitat de Catalunya no. 9681 on June 8, 2026.

Unofficial coat of arms, used until June 2026

The saltire and palm are symbols of the martyrdom of Saint Andrew, patron of the town. The tinctures used—gules, or, and vert—are the traditional colors of the Barons of Pinós, who ruled over the Barony of La Portella, which included the batllia of Sagàs, between 1369 and 1600.

Prior to 2026, the town hall had used a slightly different design for its unofficial coat of arms: a gold shield bearing a purple or red saltire cross with a palm of martyrdom (Or, a saltire couped Purpure, overall a palm frond proper).

== Celebrations ==
The festa major or "town festival" is held on November 30, the feast of the town's patron saint, St. Andrew. The parish of La Guàrdia de Sagàs holds its own celebration on the first Sunday in October, and the town hall often organizes a sopar de germanor, or "community supper", on or around October 16, the feast of Saint Gaudericus (Sant Galderic in Catalan), the patron saint of Catalan farmers.

== Main sights ==
- Church of Sant Andreu (Saint Andrew). This structure has origins in a church dedicated to Saint Andrew from the 11th century. The current church was built in the Romanesque style. It has a typical basilican floor-plan, with three naves, each crowned separately by a semi-circular apse. The church was heavily modified in the 15th century, with major interior changes as well as the addition of the present bell-tower. The altar is also famous. Beginning in 1970, a number of locals started a movement to restore the church to its original 11th-century appearance. It stands today restored.
- Church of Sant Esteve de Valldoriola
- Chapel of Santa Margarida de Sagàs, built in the 10th century or earlier.
- Chapel of Sant Jordi, a small chapel dedicated to Saint George
- Church of Sant Martí de Biure, a 10th-century Romanesque church.
- Church of Santa Maria de la Guàrdia, and its famous statue of the Virgin Mary. Located on a hill over the Llobregat valley, it is a well known for its vistas.
- Ruins of the Tower of Sagàs, a small fortress from the 5th century.

== History ==
Before the arrival of the Romans, Sagàs was inhabited by the Bergistani, an Iberian tribe. In book XXXIV of Ab Urbe Condita, Livy refers to Segestica, "an important and opulent city" ("Segesticam [...] grauem atque opulentam ciuitatem"), which most likely corresponds to Sagàs. According to Livy, Cato the Elder ordered that the walls of all Iberian towns between the Ebro river and the Pyrenees be dismantled in order to avoid further uprisings. Only Segestica resisted, and had to be "reduced by works and engines". The importance of this city in ancient times may explain the large number of pre-Latin place names (la Quar, Olvan, Merlès) found in the area directly around Sagàs.

In medieval times, the first written reference to Sagàs appears in a document from 903, describing the consecration of the Church of Sant Andreu by the Bishop of Urgell at the request of the locals, who built the church, and a priest named Galindó. The church is described as being "in territorio Bergitanensi in locum vocitatum Sagasse" (In Bergan territory, at a place called Sagasse). The current church of Sant Andreu was built somewhat later, on the same site as the original church. Little remains of the original structure, but thirteen graves, the remnants of the original church's cemetery, have been unearthed inside the nave of the current church.

Though Sagàs originally was part of the County of Osona, in the 10th century it became part of the Berga, which was later incorporated into the Cerdanya. The Monastery of Sant Pere de la Portella (in the neighbouring municipality of La Quar) acquired much of Sagàs during the 11th century. For much of the Middle Ages, the town was ruled by the Barons of la Portella, though it eventually became part of the Barony of Pinós.

It seems Sagàs has always been a farming town, with little strategic importance, although a small castle (about three metres by six metres at the base) was built there between the tenth and twelfth centuries.

In 1994, Sagàs was ravaged by wildfires that burnt much of the comarques of Berguedà and Bages; much of the forest that once characterized the town was lost, and the town's farms were dealt a serious blow.
