= Perrelli =

Perrelli is a surname. Notable people with the surname include:

- Charlotte Perrelli (born 1974), Swedish singer
- Ebel Perrelli, Brazilian composer and musician
- Gastone Mojaisky Perrelli (1914–2008), Italian Catholic archbishop
- Thomas J. Perrelli (born 1966), American lawyer

== See also ==
- Perelli, town in Corsica
- Perelli (surname)
- Perello (disambiguation)
- Pirelli, tyre manufacturer
