= El Guixaró =

el Guixaró
- Singular population entity
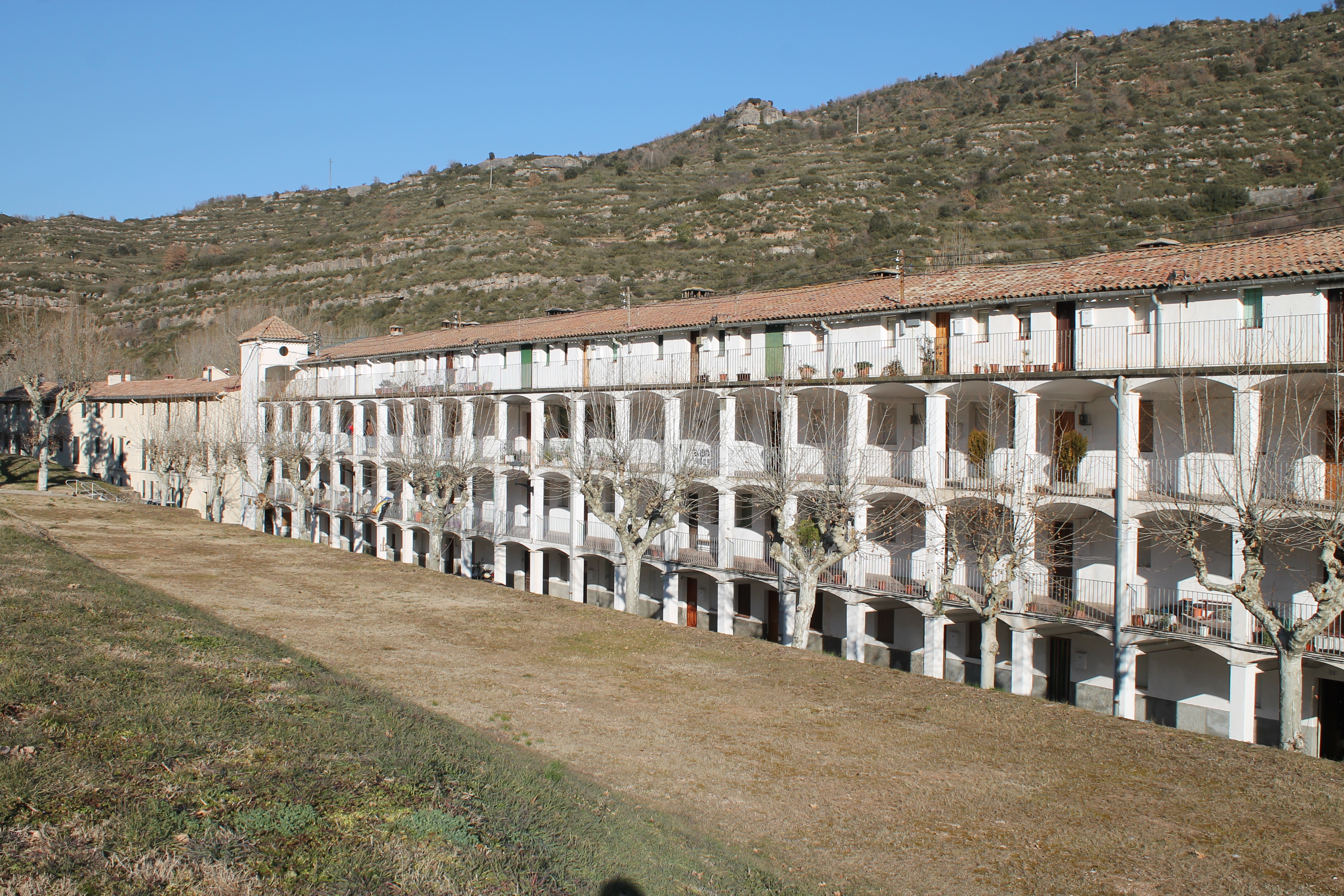
- View of el Guixaró

- Location within Spain Location within Catalonia Location within Province of Barcelona
- Coordinates: 41°59′47.8″N 1°53′11.8″E
- Country: Spain
- A. community: Catalunya
- Province: Barcelona
- Comarca: Berguedà
- Municipality: Casserres

Population (January 1, 2024)
  - Total: 135
- Time zone: UTC+01:00
- Postal code: 08680
- MCN: 08049000300

el Guixaró is a singular population entity in the municipality of Casserres, in Catalonia, Spain.

As of 2024 it has a population of 135 people.
