= Perriello =

Perriello is a surname. Notable people with the surname include:

- Tami Perriello, American government administrator
- Tom Perriello (born 1974), American politician

== See also ==
- Perello (disambiguation)
