= Cal Ramons =

- Singular population entity
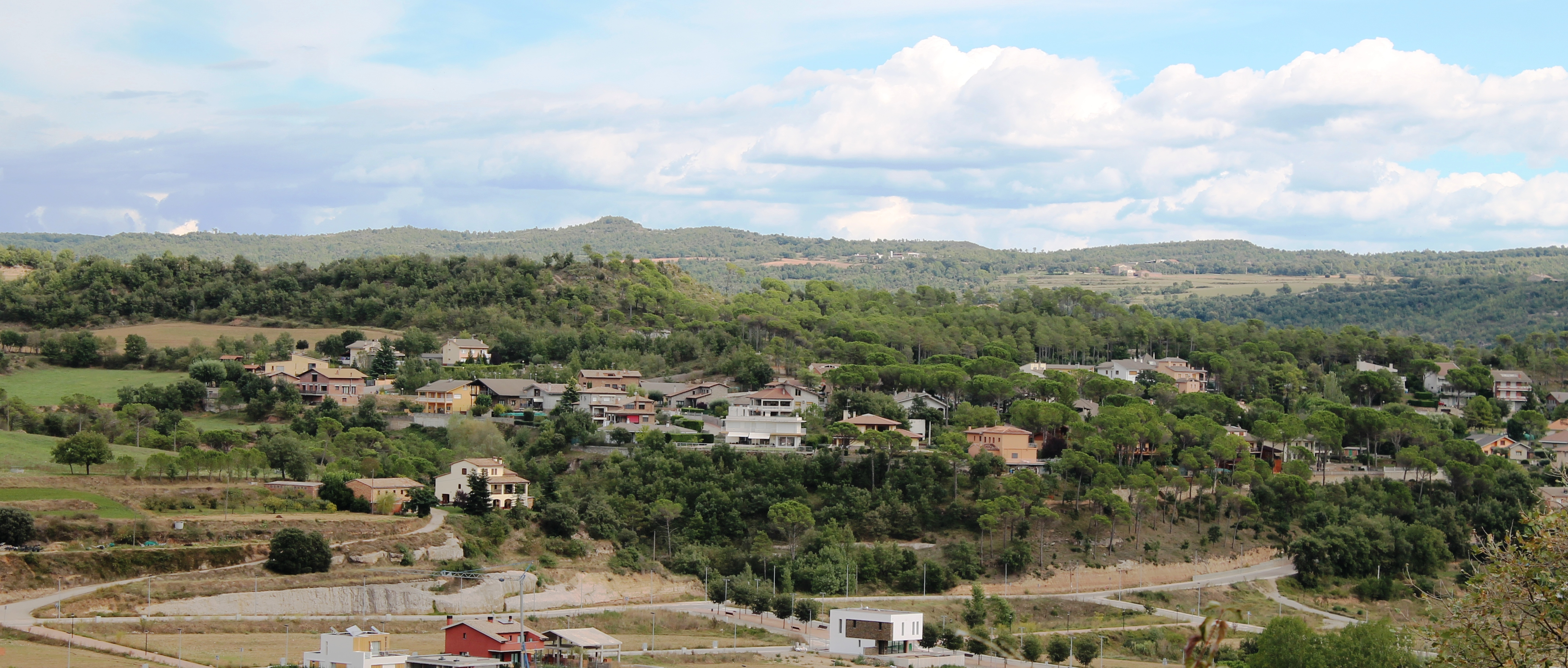
- View of Cal Ramons

- Location within Spain Location within Catalonia Location within Province of Barcelona
- Coordinates: 42°01′31.1″N 1°53′20.1″E
- Country: Spain
- A. community: Catalunya
- Province: Barcelona
- Comarca: Berguedà
- Municipality: Gironella

Population (January 1, 2024)
  - Total: 209
- Time zone: UTC+01:00
- Postal code: 08680
- MCN: 08092000500

Cal Ramons is a singular population entity in the municipality of Gironella, in Catalonia, Spain.

As of 2024 it has a population of 209 people.
