= L'Ametlla de Casserres =

Singular population entity in Spain

l'Ametlla de Casserres
- Singular population entity
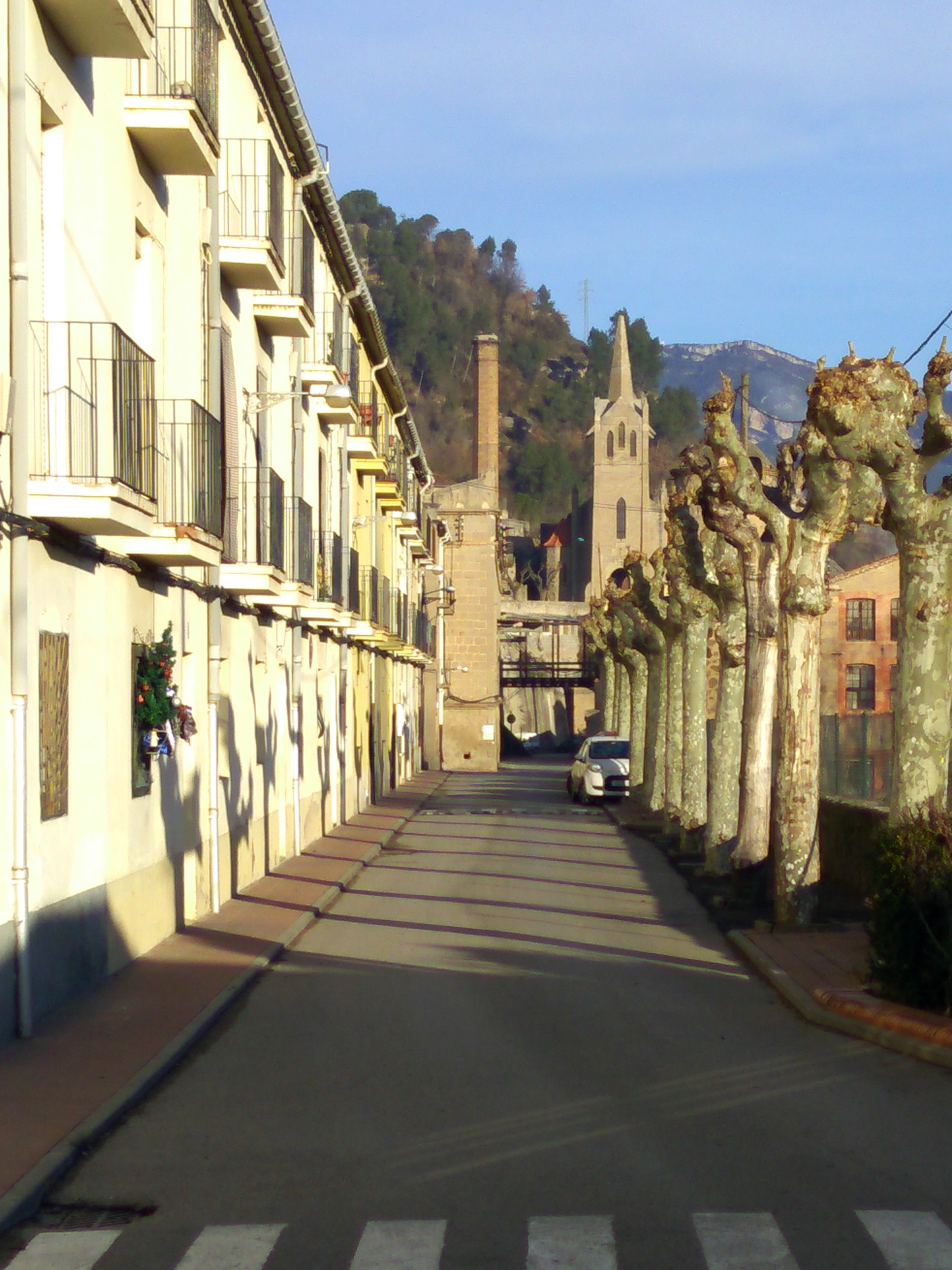
- View of l'Ametlla de Casserres

- Location within Spain Location within Catalonia Location within Province of Barcelona
- Coordinates: 42°02′41.8″N 1°52′24.4″E
- Country: Spain
- A. community: Catalunya
- Province: Barcelona
- Comarca: Berguedà
- Municipality: Casserres

Population (January 1, 2024)
  - Total: 153
- Time zone: UTC+01:00
- Postal code: 08680
- MCN: 08049000100

l'Ametlla de Casserres is a singular population entity in the municipality of Casserres, in Catalonia, Spain.

As of 2024 it has a population of 153 people.
