= Viladomiu Nou =

- Singular population entity
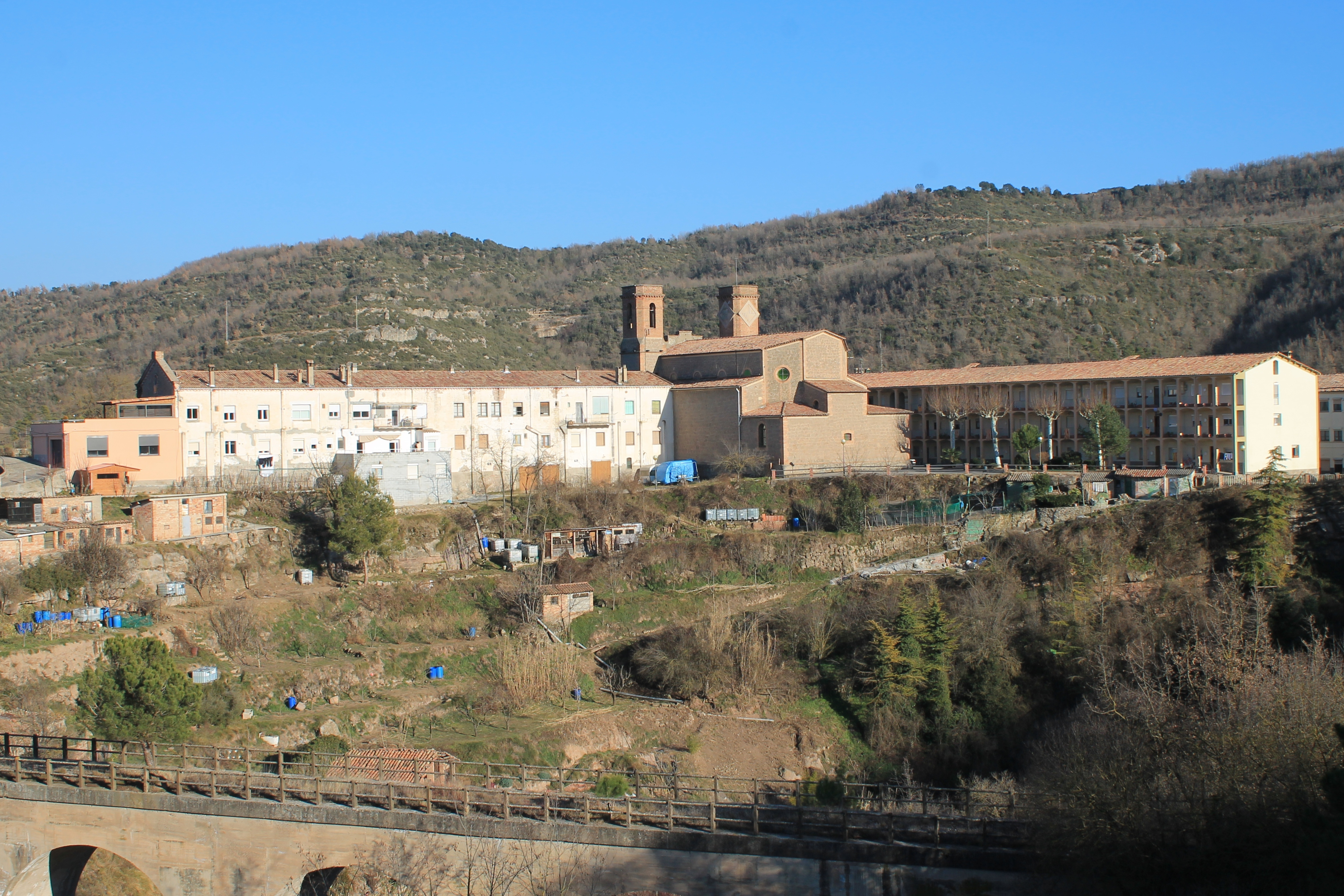
- View of Viladomiu Nou

- Location within Spain Location within Catalonia Location within Province of Barcelona
- Coordinates: 42°00′14.4″N 1°53′11.0″E
- Country: Spain
- A. community: Catalunya
- Province: Barcelona
- Comarca: Berguedà
- Municipality: Gironella

Population (January 1, 2024)
  - Total: 164
- Time zone: UTC+01:00
- Postal code: 08680
- MCN: 08092000300

Viladomiu Nou is a singular population entity in the municipality of Gironella, in Catalonia, Spain.

As of 2024 it has a population of 164 people.
