= Sant Martí, Biure =

Romanesque church in Spain

Coordinates: 42°1′24.99″N 1°55′46.13″E

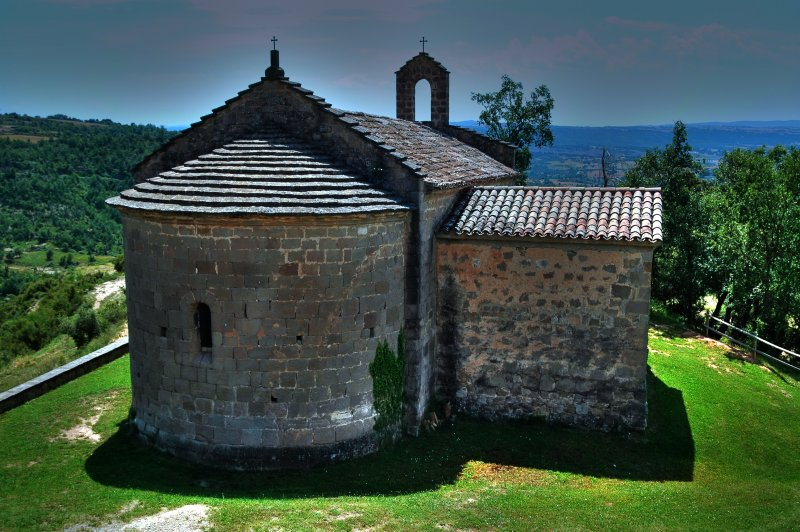
Sant Martí de Biure.

Sant Martí de Biure is a tenth-century Romanesque church located in the municipality of Sagàs, Catalonia, northern Spain.

== History ==
The church was built sometime around the turn of the tenth century by the inhabitants of the town of Biure, then called Benevivere, who had recently come to the area as part of the attempts at repopulation of the areas recently conquered by the Christian Counts of Barcelona from the Moors. With the encouragement of a local baron named Guadamir, bishop Nantigís of Urgell consecrated the church on 13 December 903, establishing it as the seat of its own parish.

In 1044 it was re-consecrated by bishop Guillem Guifré of Urgell, who confirmed its status as an independent parish. It is possible that the church was a residence of the Knights Templar from the end of the 12th century until the extinction of the order in the fourteenth century.

Soon afterwards, due to a population decline in Biure, the church lost its status as an independent parish, and became part of the parish of Sant Andreu de Sagàs. Nevertheless, a side chapel and a sacristy were added to the church around this time.

Around the year 1890, the bishop of Vic, Josep Morgades took a 'majestat' (probably a crucifix of Christ wearing a robe) from the church and placed it in the Episcopal Museum of Vic. It is unclear whether the piece remains in the museum's collection.

The church was restored in the 1950s.

== Description ==
Sant Martí de Biure consists of a single rectangular nave covered with a vaulted stone roof. The northeastern end is capped by a semi-circular apse. There is a small chapel attached to the northwestern wall of the church.

== Gallery ==
Sant Martí de Biure

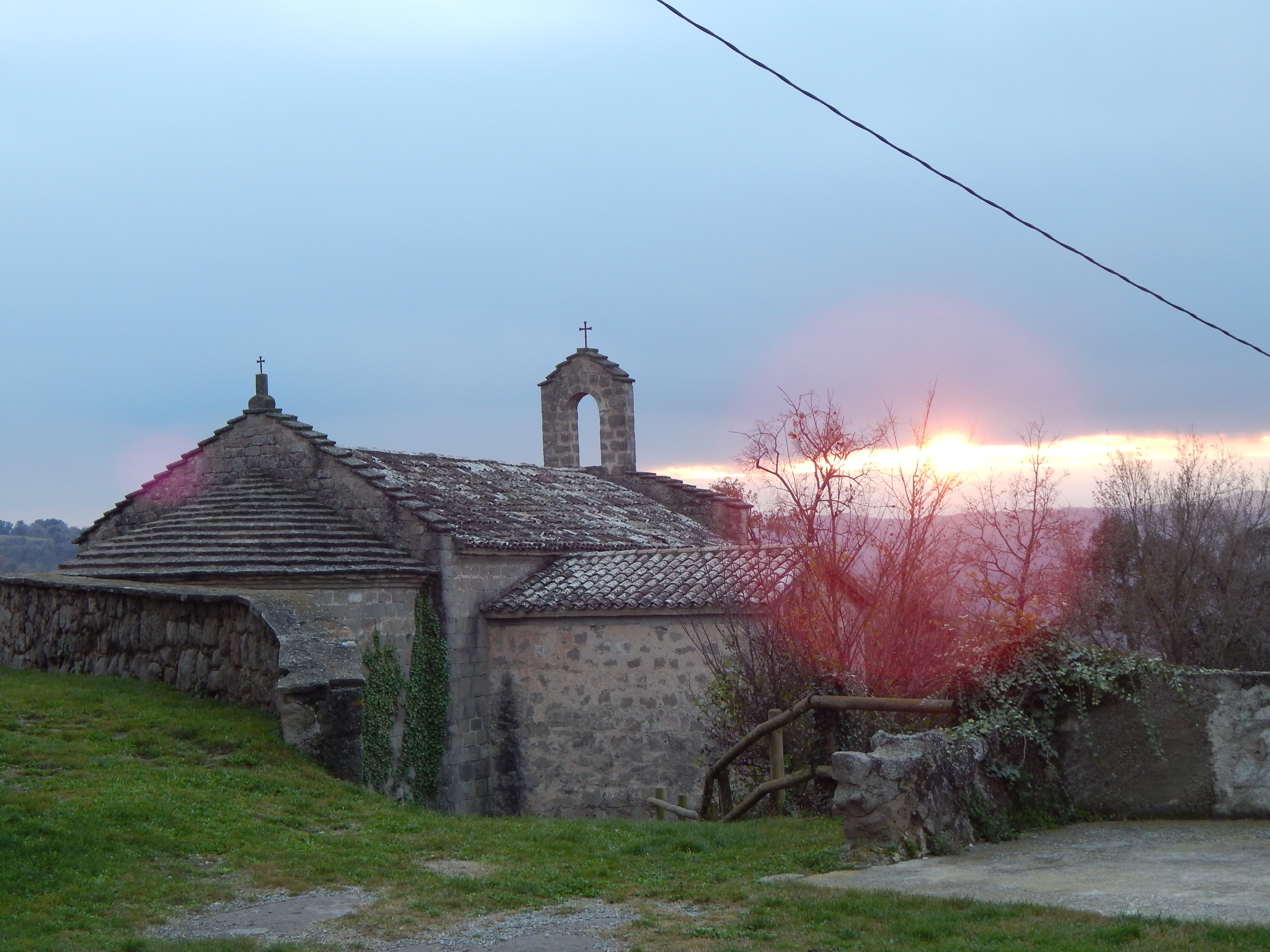

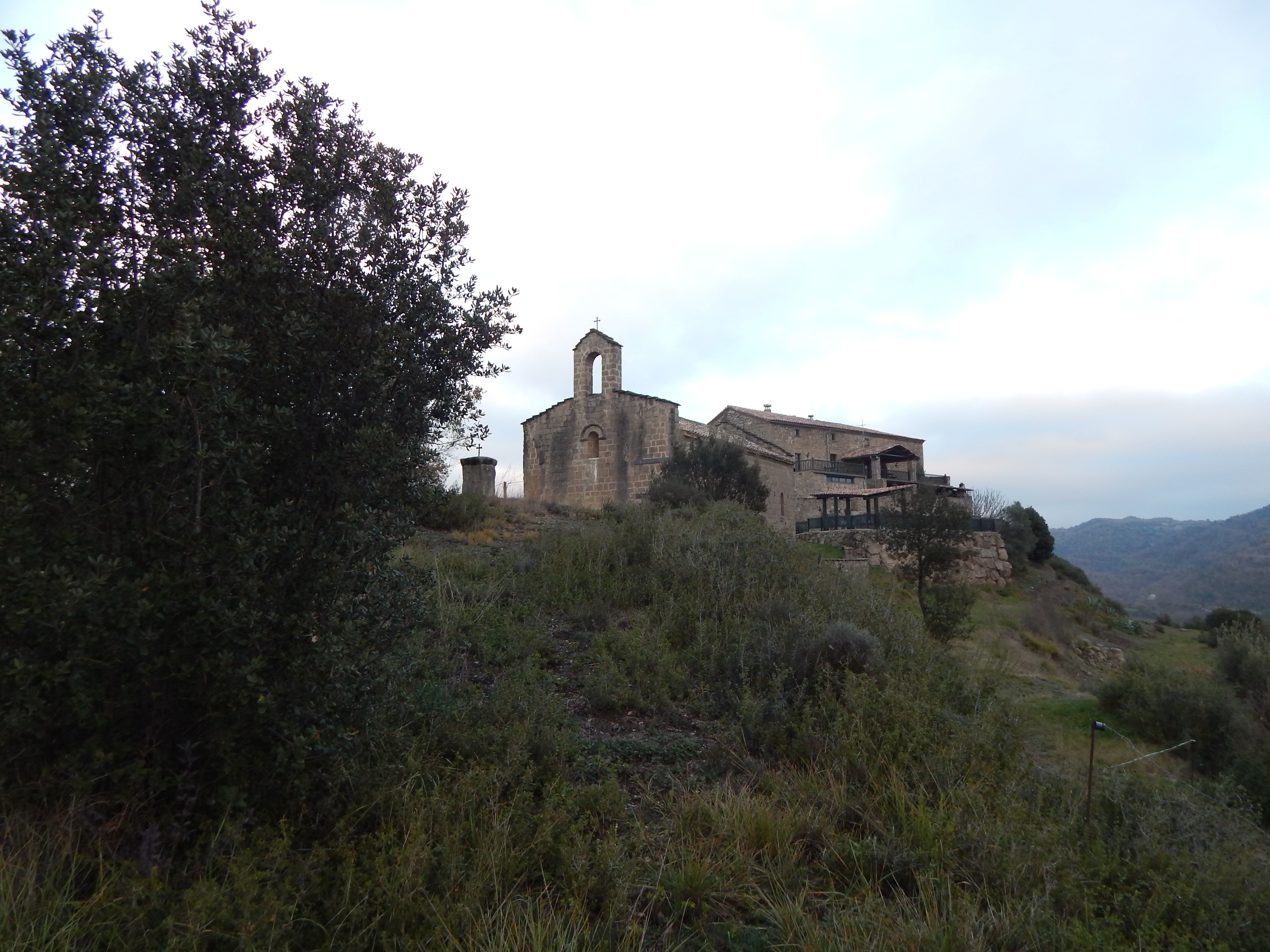

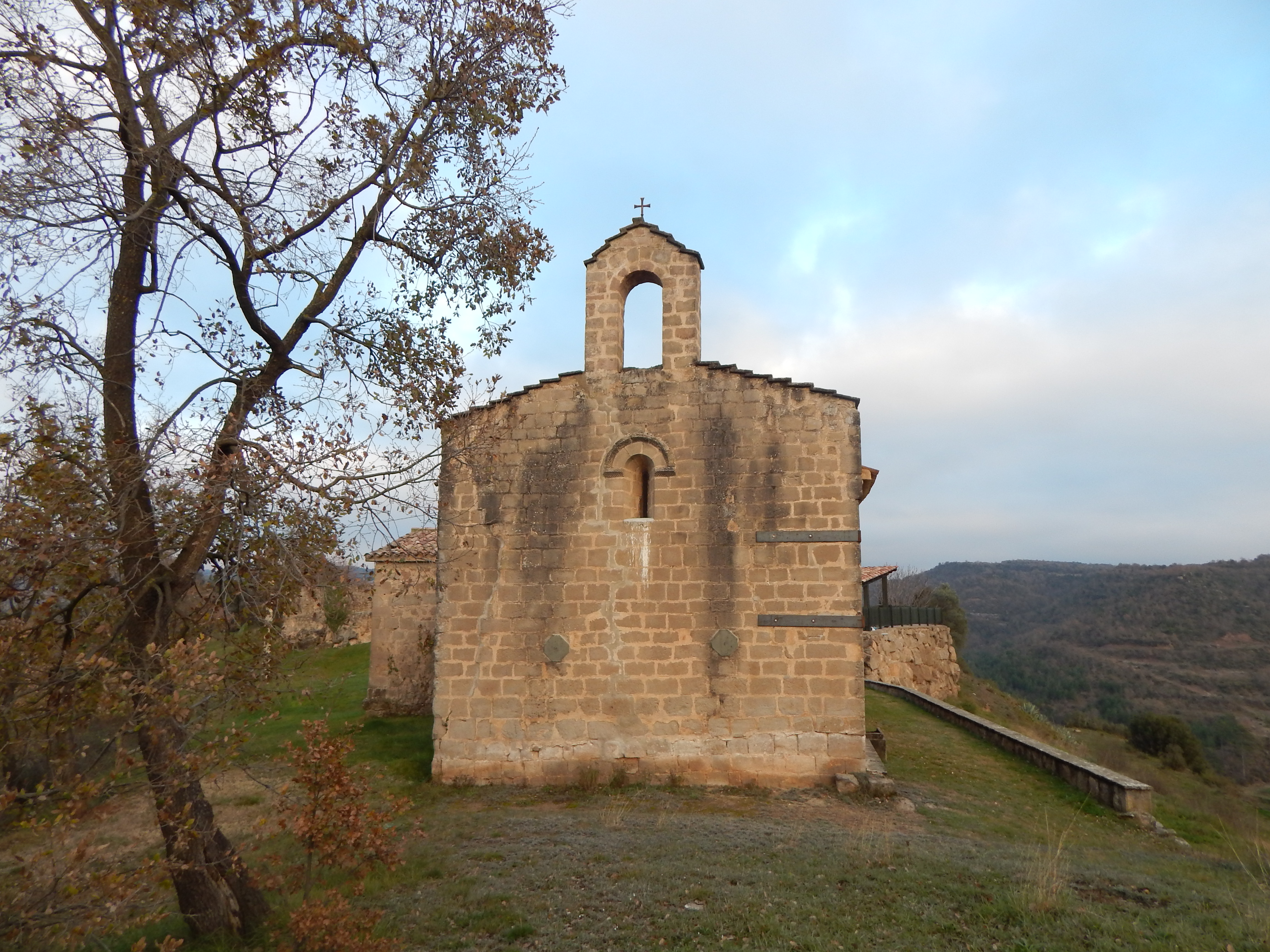

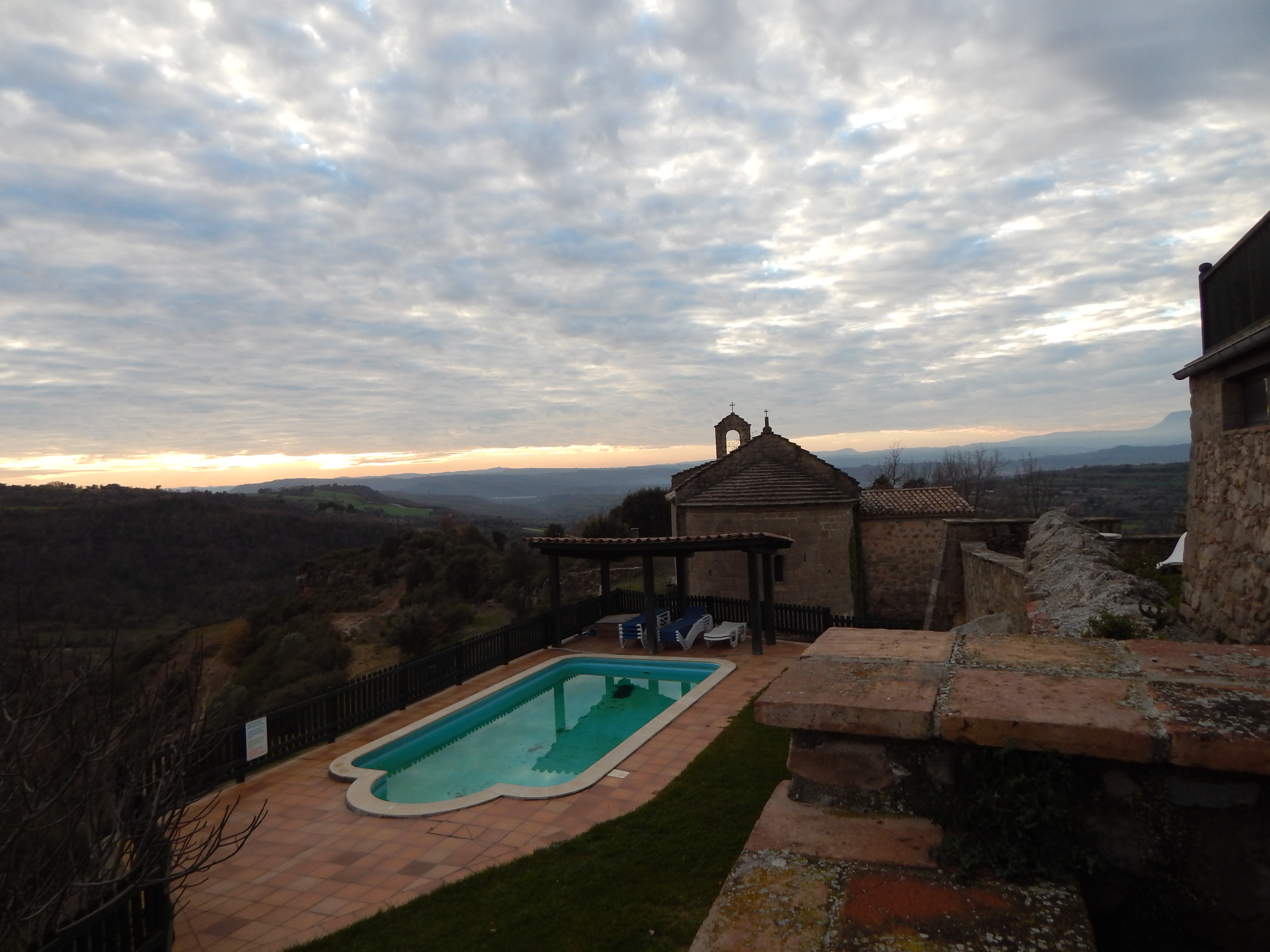

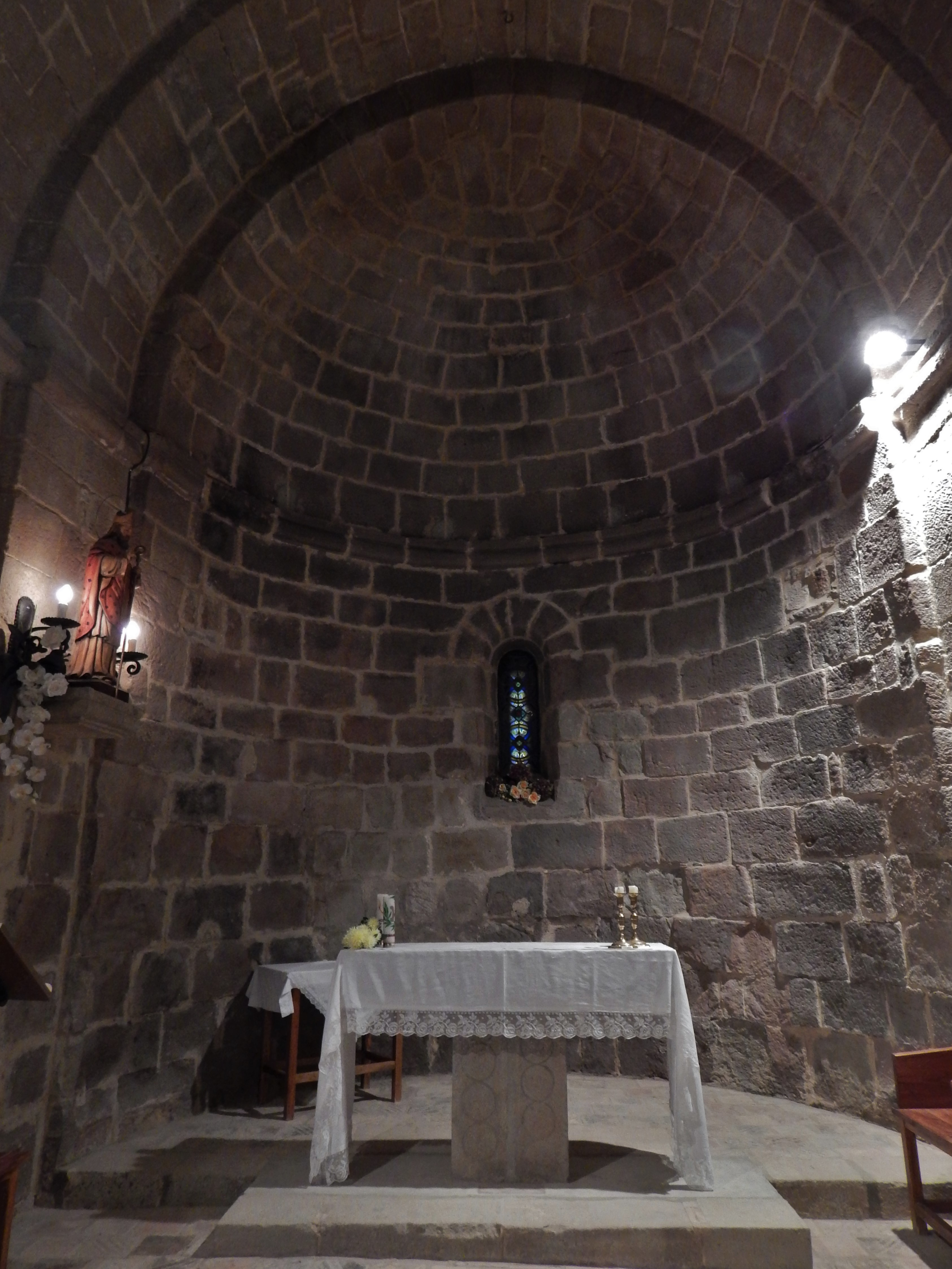

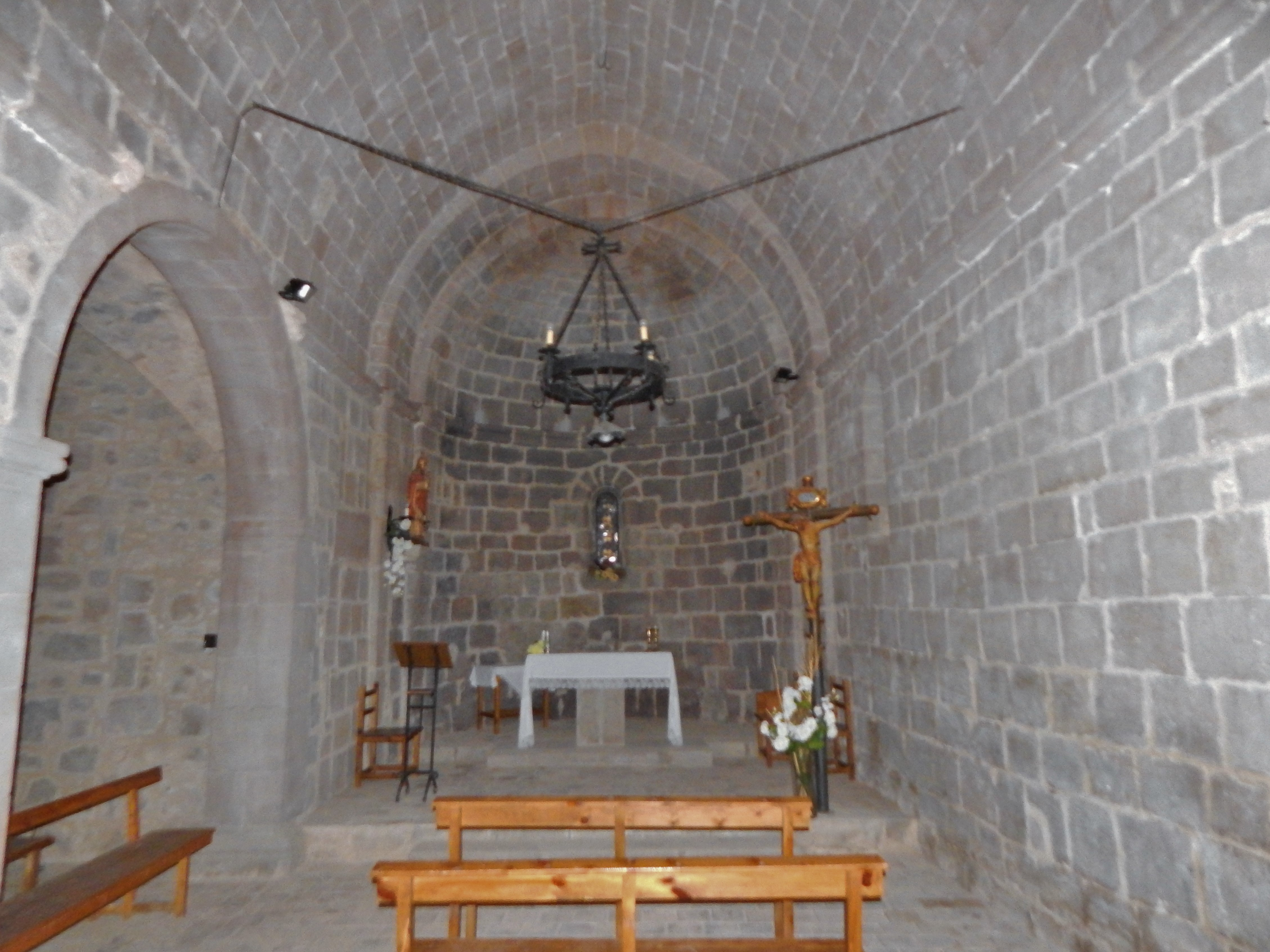

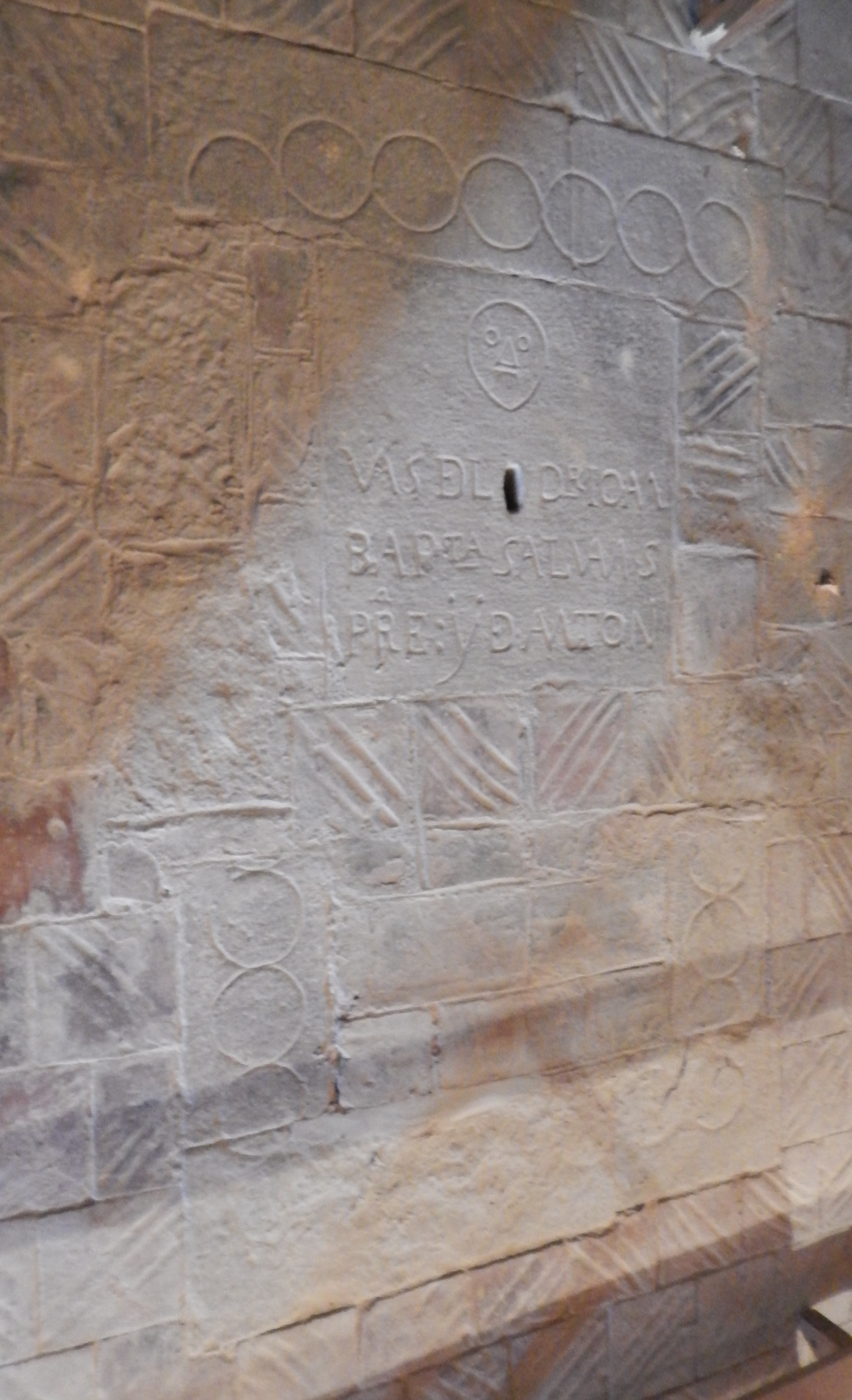

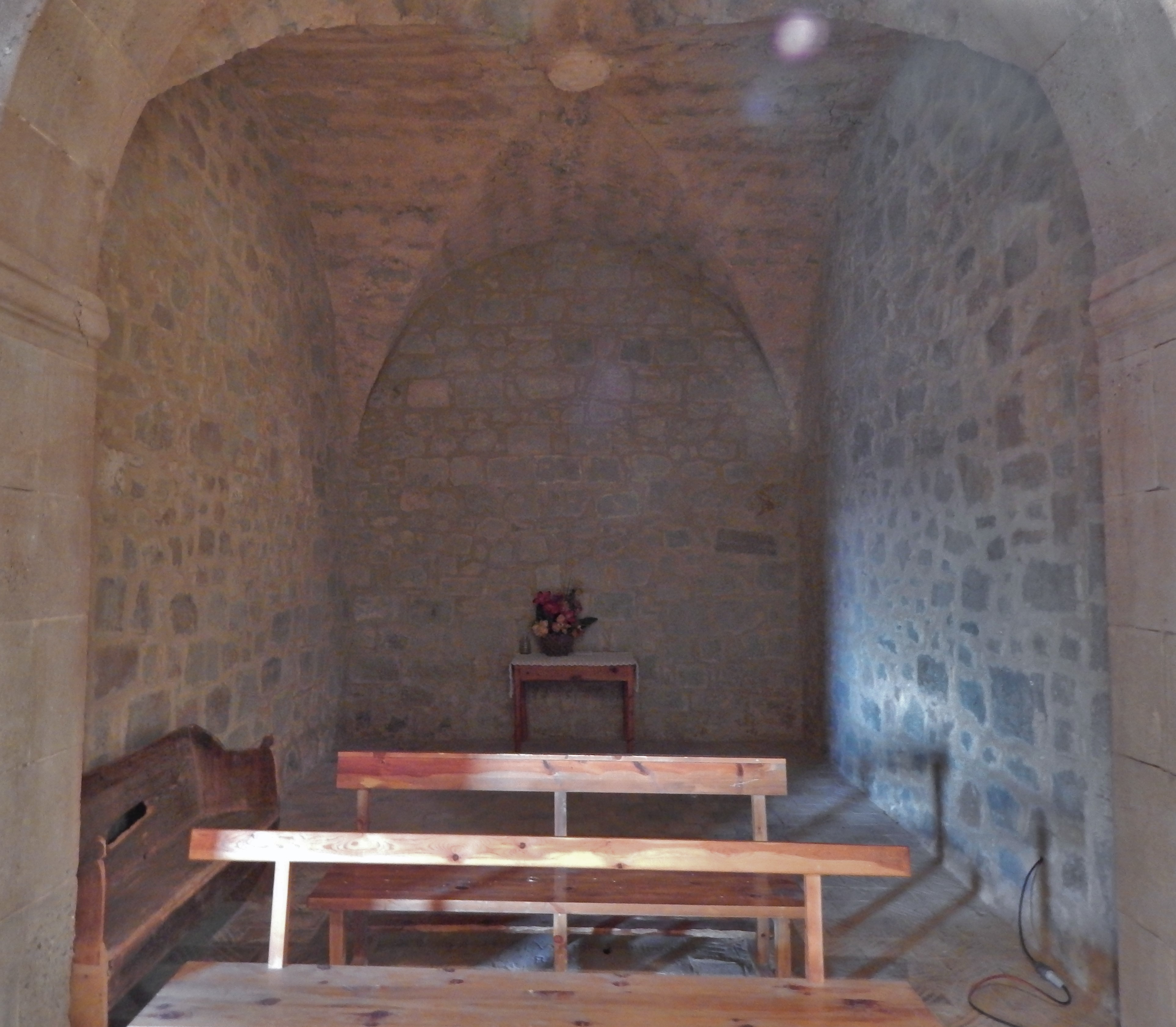

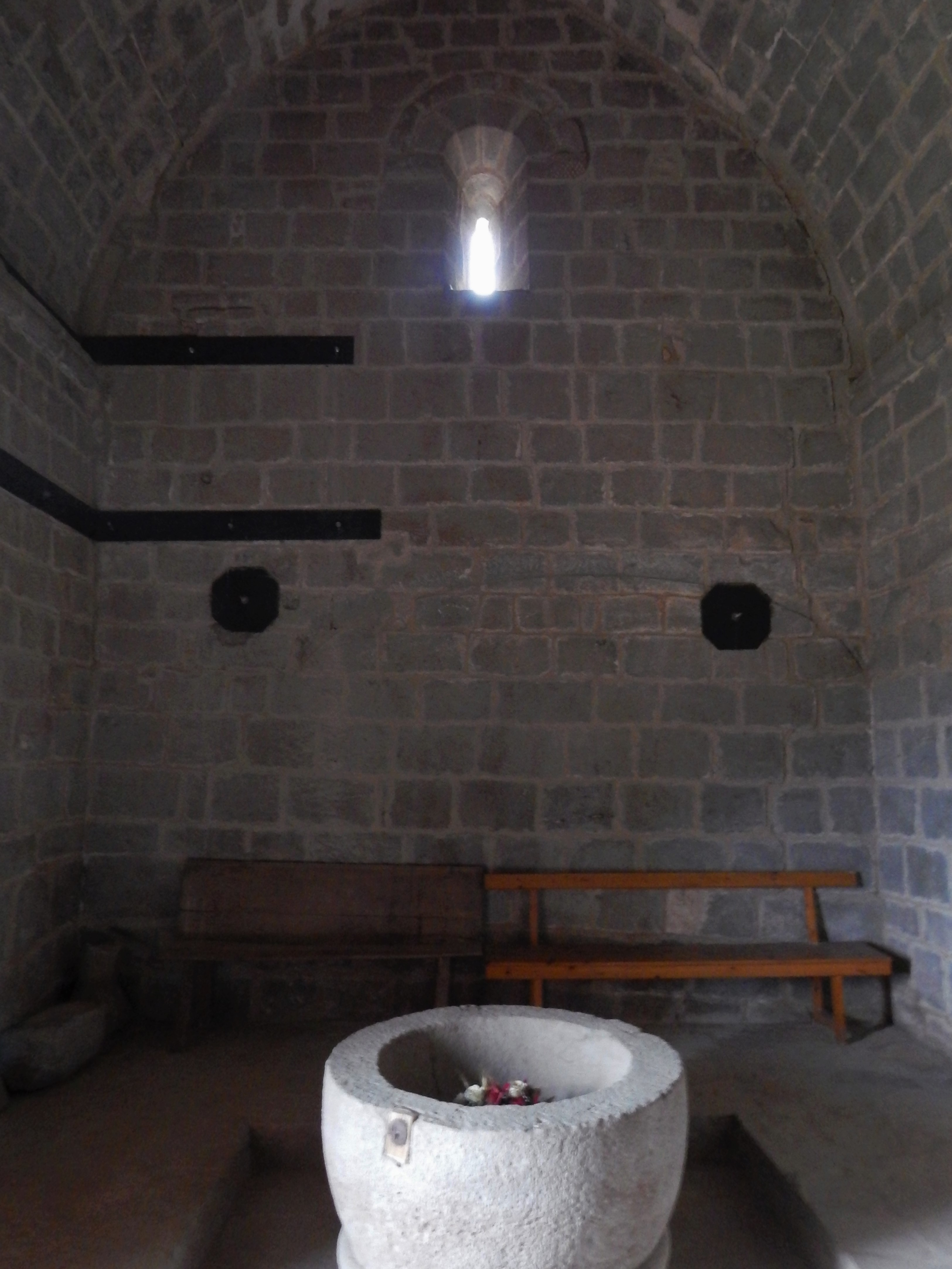

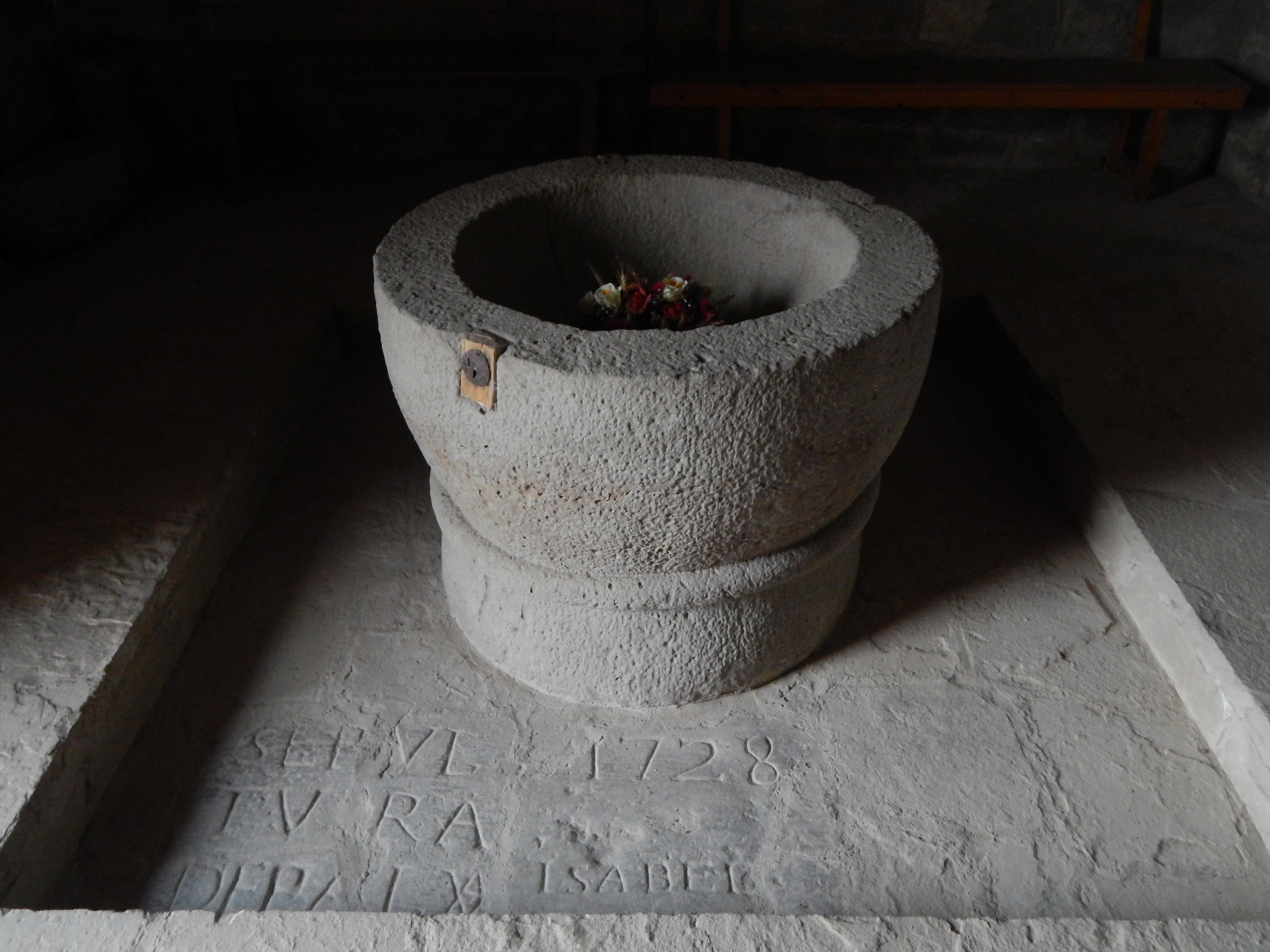

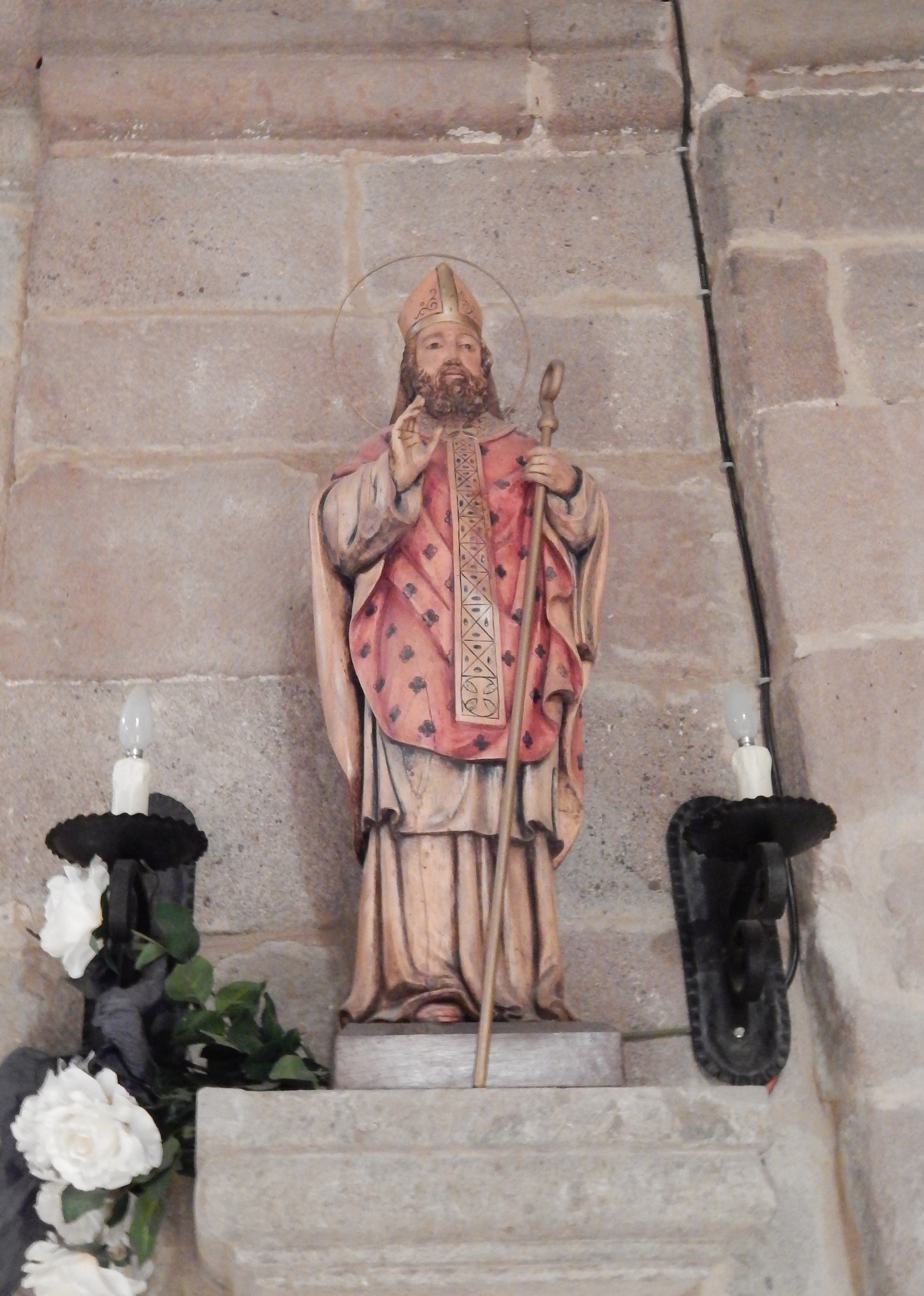

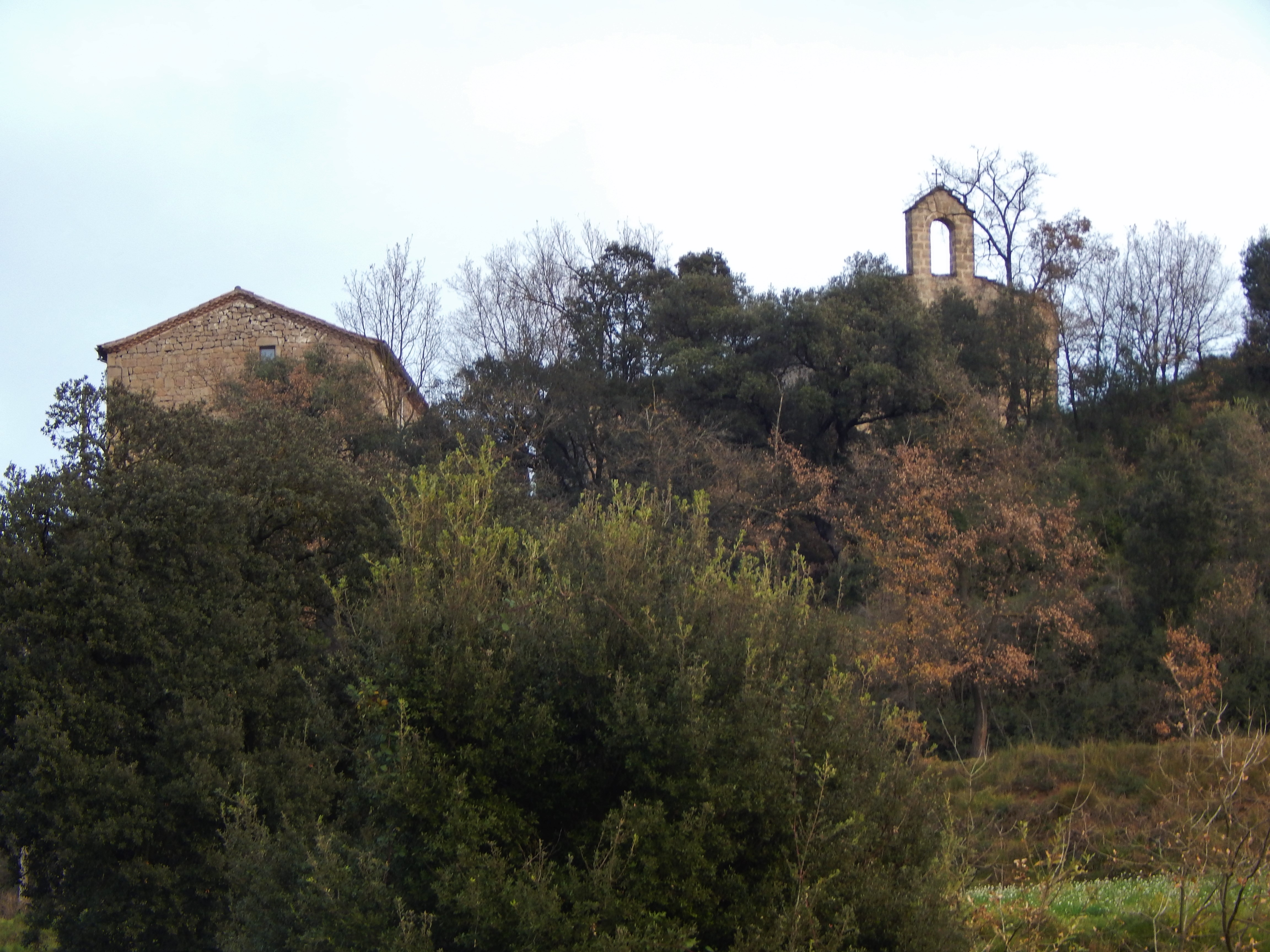
