= Perelli (surname) =

Perelli is a surname. Notable people with the surname include:

- Carina Perelli (born 1957), Uruguayan expert in elections
- Giulia Perelli (footballer) (born 1982), Italian footballer
- Giulia Perelli (tennis) (1897–1964), Italian tennis player
- Tommaso Perelli (1704–1783), Italian astronomer

== See also ==
- Perrelli, surname
- Pirelli, tyre manufacturer
