= Tormos =

- Municipality
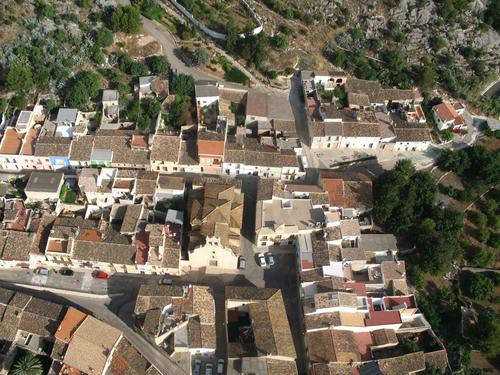

- Coat of arms

- Location within Spain Location within Valencian Community Location within Europe
- Coordinates: 38°48′06″N 0°04′21″W
- Country: Spain
- Autonomous Community: Valencian Community
- Province: Alicante
- Comarca: Marina Alta

Government
  - Type: Mayor-council government
  - Body: Ajuntament de Tormos
  - Mayor: Vicente Javier Ripoll Pereto (2015) (PP)

Area
  - Total: 5.30 km^{2} (2.05 sq mi)
- Elevation: 125 m (410 ft)

Population (2025-01-01)
  - Total: 323
  - Density: 60.9/km^{2} (158/sq mi)
- Demonym(s): Tormero, -ra (es) tormer, ra (va)
- Time zone: CET (GMT +1)
  - Summer (DST): CEST (GMT +2)
- Postcode: 03795

Tormos is a municipality in the province of Alicante and autonomous community of Valencia, Spain. The municipality covers an area of 5.3 square kilometres (2.0 sq mi) and as of 2011 had a population of 383 people.

== Notable people ==
José Perelló Torrens (Tormos, Alicante, 1885–1955) was a Republican politician in Spain and the Mayor of Tormos during the 1930s.

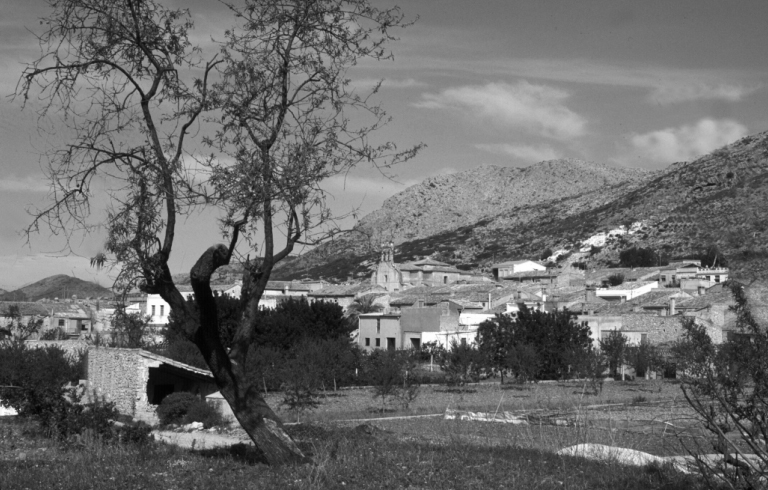
Vista de Tormos

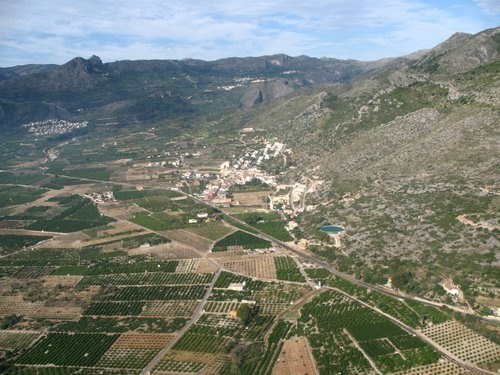
Vista área parcial del término municipal de Tormos
