= Santa Margarida, Sagàs =

Santa Margarida de Sagàs is an abandoned rural chapel in the town of Sagàs, Catalonia, dating at least from the 10th century.

== Location ==
Santa Margarida is located on a wooded hillside bordered by cultivated fields in the rural municipality of Sagàs, Catalonia. It is located in between the Carretera de Sagàs a la Quar (highway BV-4346) and the Carretera vella de Sant Maurici, two roads which branch off from highway C-154 going east from the town of Gironella.
It can either be accessed via a small footpath which branches off to the east from the Carretera vella de Sant Maurici roughly a kilometer from its beginning, or by hiking roughly a kilometer to the northwest from the church of Sant Andreu de Sagàs. Santa Margarida can be found on many detailed maps of the area.

== History ==
The oldest surviving record of the chapel is from the year 988, when Count Borrell and the Bishop of Urgell agreed to exchange a significant amount of land for certain churches. Santa Margarida seems to have been part of the deal, though it was considered to be dependent on the nearby church of Sant Andreu de Sagàs.

It seems that Santa Margarida has always been a simple rural chapel dependent on other churches, and has never been an independent church in its own right.

== Description ==
Santa Margarida is a small stone chapel consisting of a single (roughly) rectangular nave covered in a vaulted stone roof. The inside of the church is plastered, but the floor is made of dirt and strewn with uneven flagstones, though holes at the base of the wall seem to indicate that at some point, the chapel had a raised wooden floor. At one end of the church sits a large block of stone that serves as the altar.

Though many features of the chapel are romanesque in style, including the arched doorway and vaulted roof, the elements original to the structure, including the narrow windows, the altar, and the construction of the walls are characteristic of the pre-romanesque style of architecture.

== Condition of the Chapel ==
While Santa Margarida is in fairly good condition considering its age and remote location, the current owners of the chapel have recently allowed it to fall into a lamentable state of disrepair. The barrel-tiles that cover the roof have begun to fall of in one corner of the building, exposing the ceiling to the elements. The wooden door to the chapel is broken, but because a large stone is beginning to fall from the lintel, it can only be opened wide enough for a person to squeeze through. There is also a large hole by the door on the inside of the church, where the stoup (holy water receptacle) was once installed; the broken stoup lies on the floor with several other stones pulled from the wall.
