= Nantigis =

Nantigís (fl. 900-914) was a 10th century bishop of Urgell.

He was an active builder of church buildings including the church of Sant Salvador de Mata consecrated on December 13, 899, Santa Maria de la Quar and Sant Jaume de Frontanyà both consecrated in 905, Sant Martí d'Avià in 907 and Santa Eugènia de Sallagosa in 913.

Records of the time are scant and exact dates for his episcopate are hard to come together.
