= Perrella =

Perrella is an Italian surname. Notable people with the surname include:

- Barbara Perrella, American curler
- Matt Perrella (born 1991), American soccer player
- Zezé Perrella (born 1957), Brazilian politician and businessman

== See also ==
- Perella, surname
