= Silence March (Mexico) =

March to protest against the Government of Mexico

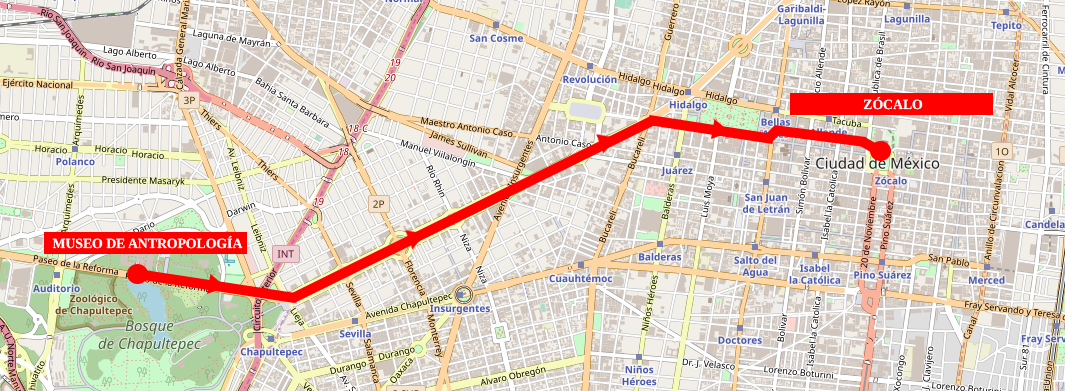
Map of the route of the March of Silence – 1968

The Silence March (in Spanish: Marcha del Silencio) was a demonstration that was held in Mexico City on September 13, 1968. The purpose of the march was to protest against the Government of Mexico. The march was organized by the National Strike Council (CNH, in Spanish, Consejo Nacional de Huelga), the organization behind the Mexican Movement of 1968.

CNH called for a silent pacifist demonstration to controvert Mexican Government allegations of violence of the movement and the silence made by President Gustavo Díaz Ordaz in his Fourth Government Inform on September 1, 1968, about the students and the movement. So the demonstration was entirely silent and with Mexican flags instead strike' red and black flags also paintings and portraits of heroes of Mexico.

The demonstration was from National Museum of Anthropology in Chapultepec going through Paseo de la Reforma and arriving at the main square of Mexico City, the Zócalo.
