= La Quar =

- Municipality
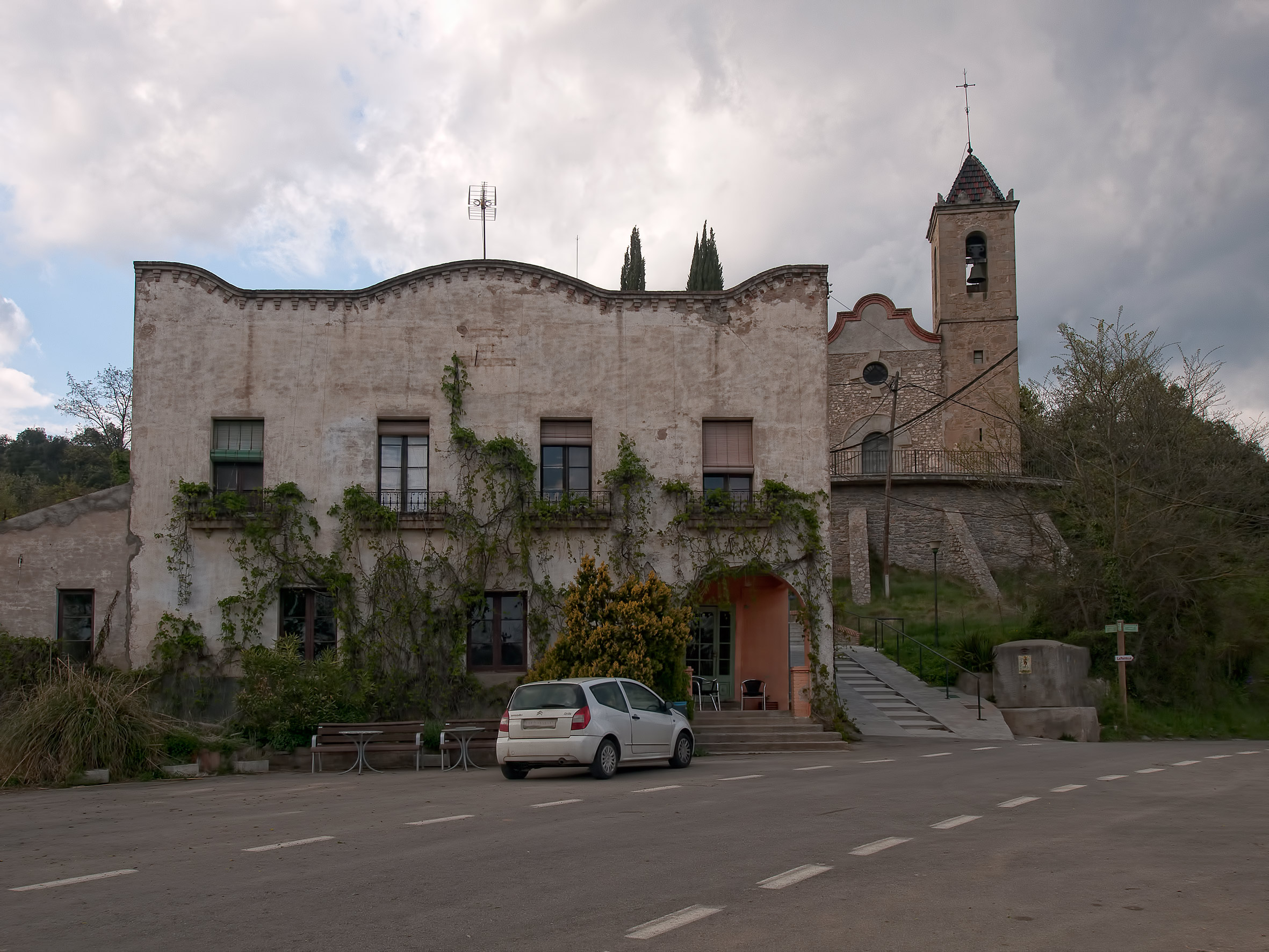
- The village of Sant Maurici de la Quar

- Flag Coat of arms

- Location in Berguedà

- Location in Catalonia La Quar (Spain)
- Coordinates: 42°06′25″N 1°58′54″E
- Country: Spain
- Community: Catalonia
- Province: Barcelona
- Comarca: Berguedà

Government
  - Mayor: Antonio Franch Cid (2015) (CiU)

Area
  - Total: 38.2 km^{2} (14.7 sq mi)
- Elevation: 885 m (2,904 ft)

Population (2025-01-01)
  - Total: 41
  - Density: 1.1/km^{2} (2.8/sq mi)
- Demonym: Quartenc
- Postal code: 08619
- Website: laquar.cat

La Quar (Catalan pronunciation: [lə ˈkwaɾ]; locally [lə ˈkɔɾ]) is a small town and municipality located in the comarca of Berguedà, in Catalonia. The area is characterized by its isolated farmhouses and a few small settlements. Historically, the traditional center of La Quar was Santa Maria de la Quar, situated on a defensible rocky outcropping. However, this site no longer has permanent residents, and the center of the municipality has shifted to Sant Maurici de la Quar, located on the main road.

== Geography ==
La Quar is nestled in the foothills of the Pyrenees, surrounded by peaks around 1000 meters high to the north and west. Despite its proximity to the town of Berga, La Quar can only be accessed from the south, which contributes to its relative isolation.

== History ==
Within the municipality lies the ruins of the Monastery of La Portella This monastery once held significant power, making La Quar important despite its small population. The town was also the seat of the influential noble family of La Portella. The first recorded mention of the Monastery of La Portella dates back to 1003, and it was eventually abandoned in 1835. During the Carlist Wars, the Carlist authorities moved the University of Solsona to the abandoned monastery for defensive purposes.

At some point a Romanesque sculpture of Virgin and Child, known as the Mare de Déu de la Quar was discovered in the municipality. The Virgin was believed to have healing properties, making La Quar a local pilgrimage site. Today, the sculpture is kept in the church of Sant Maurici, along with numerous crutches and wax representations of limbs left by those who claimed to have been healed by her.

The church of Santa Maria de la Quar was consecrated by Bishop Nantigis of La Seu d'Urgell in 899–900, and the building was extensively refurbished in the 16th century, a time of great endowment for many church buildings as Spain's expanding empire bought great wealth to the area.
