= Perella =

Perella is a surname. Notable people with the surname include:

- Joe Perella (c. 1940–2020), American college football coach
- Joseph Perella (born 1941), Italian-American financier
- Marco Perella (born 1949), American actor and author

== See also ==
- Perella Weinberg Partners, financial services firm established in 2006
- Perrella, surname
- Wasserstein Perella & Co., investment bank established in 1988
