= Sant Pere de la Portella =

Benedictine monastery in Catalonia, Spain

Coordinates: 42.103761°N 1.95°E

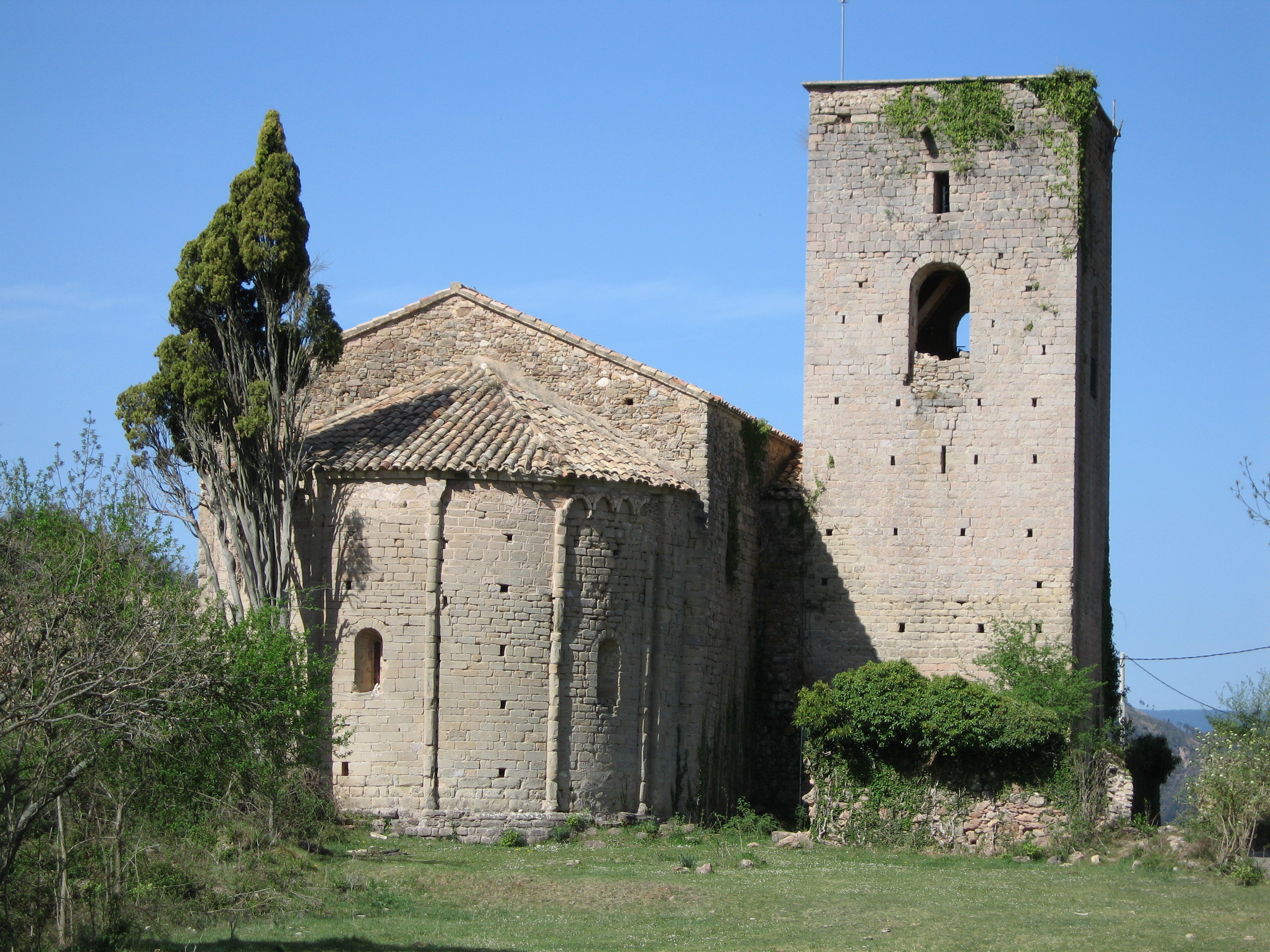
Sant Pere de la Portella

Sant Pere de la Portella is a Benedictine monastery in the town of La Quar, in the comarca of Berguedà, Catalonia, Spain. The 11th-century building was built in Romanesque style. In 2010, it was declared a Bien de Interés Cultural landmark.

== Architecture and furnishings ==
The main element of the monastery is its church, which consists of a wide nave roofed with a barrel vault and terminated by a slightly narrower apse. The apse is also covered by a semicircular vault, and is decorated. There are blind arcades in groups of four between semicircular columns reinforced by brackets.

The building's principal entrance is located on the west façade, and is constructed as a door with two arches. On the south wall, another door leads to the adjacent cloister. Attached to the north elevation is the bell tower, of a square plan, with a single, large arched opening on each of its sides. The cloister, situated to the south, had two floors, both containing typical porched walkways framed by arches. There are monastic rooms designed in the typical style of the Benedictine monasteries, containing a refectory, kitchen, bedroom, and dressing room; though half of this is in ruins.

== Bibliography ==
- Pladevall, Antoni (2001), Guies Catalunya Romànica, El Berguedà, Barcelona, Pòrtic. ISBN 84 7306 697 9 (in Catalan)
