= José Perelló Torrens =

Spanish politician (1885–1955)

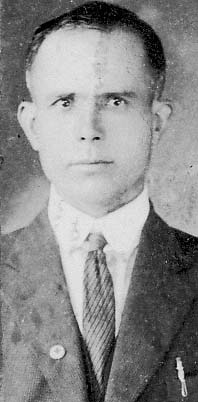
- José Perelló Torrens in 1924

Mayor of Tormos (Alicante, Spain)
- In office 14 April 1931 – 1 April 1939

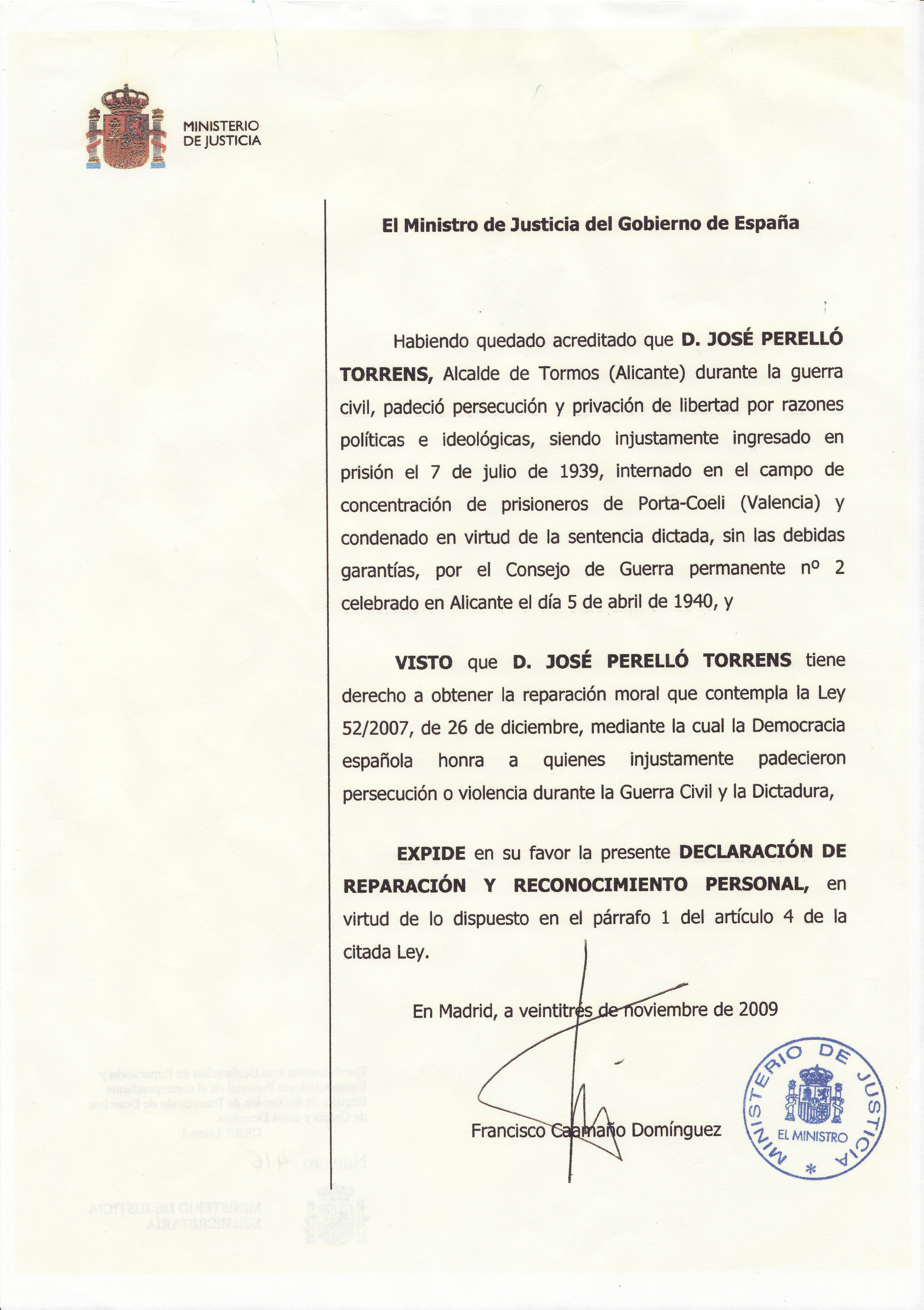
Moral reparation and personal recognition of José Perelló Torrens (A)

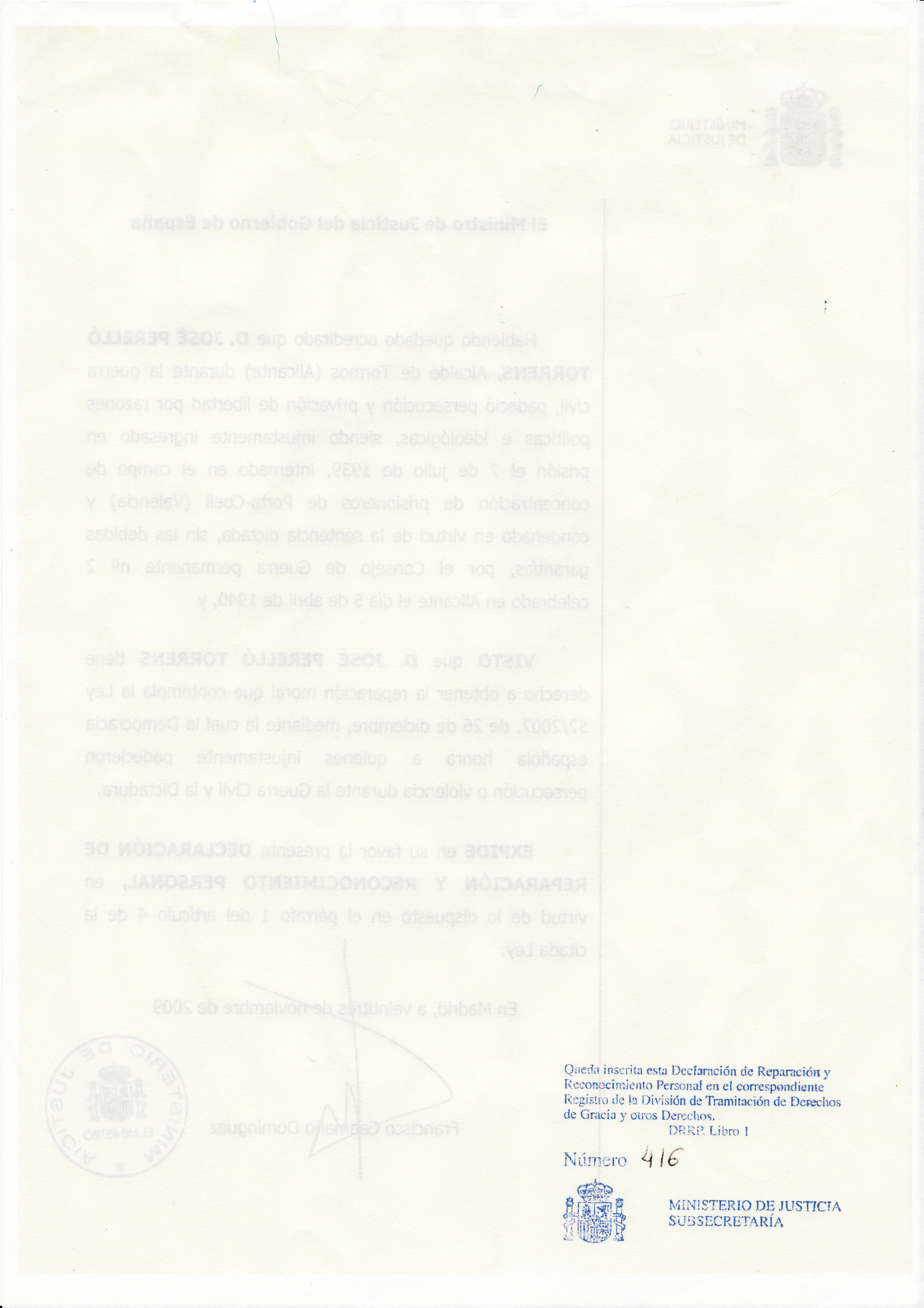
Moral reparation and personal recognition of José Perelló Torrens (B)

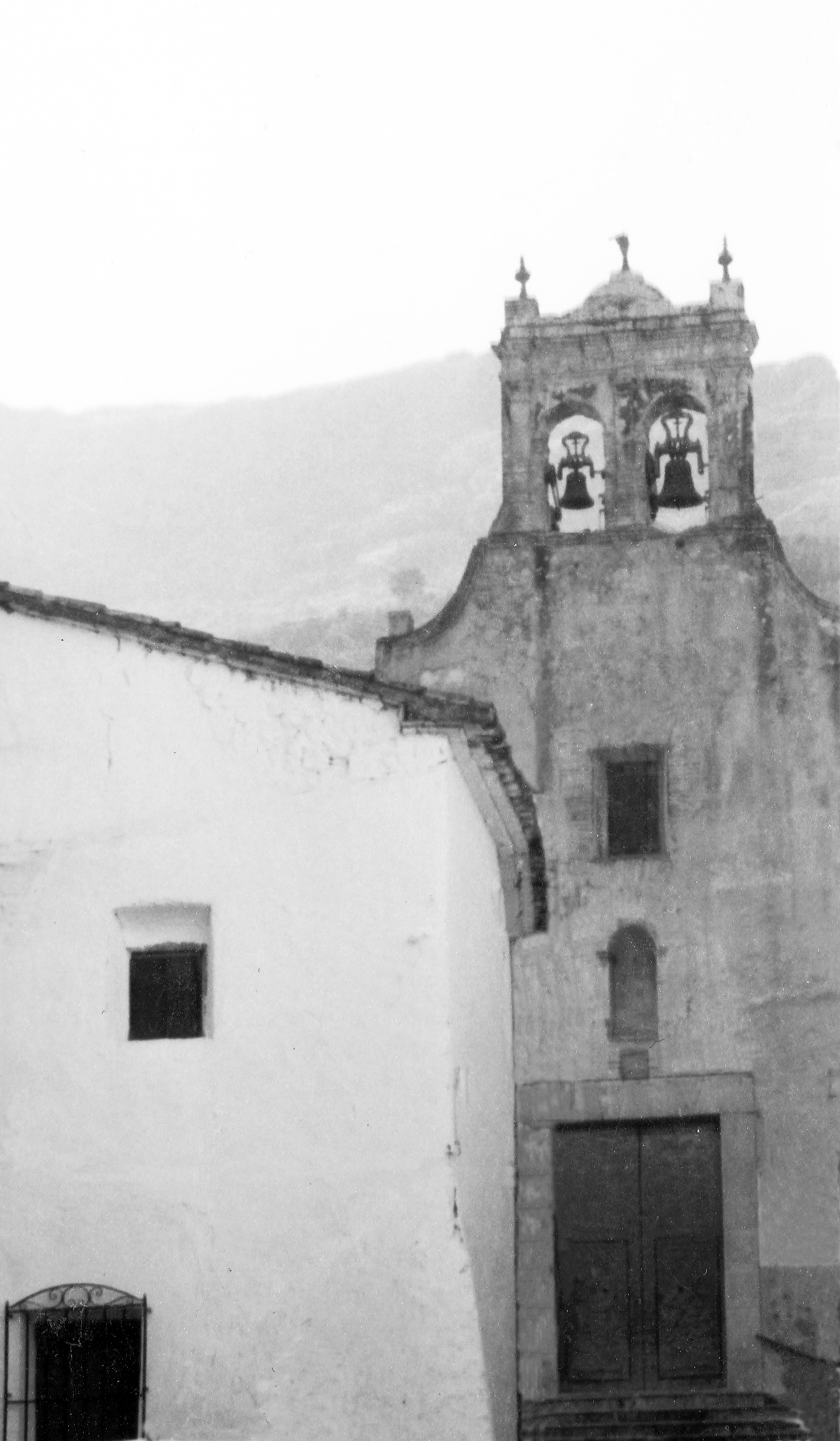
View of the Tormos church

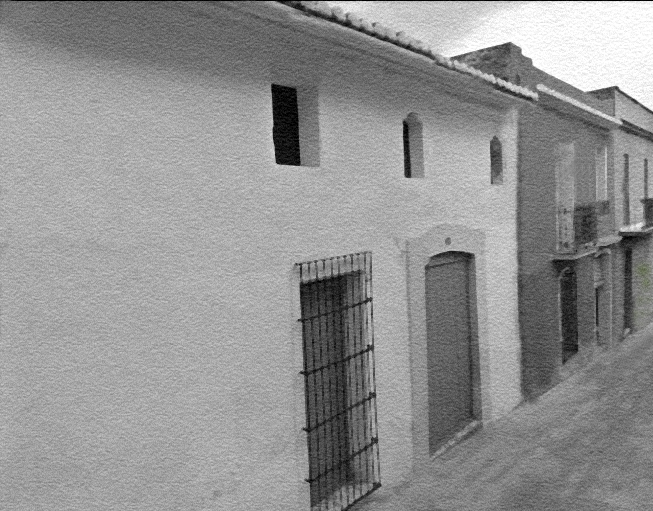
House of José Perelló Torrens in Tormos

Jose Perelló Torrens (Tormos, Alicante, 1885–1955) was a Republican politician in Spain and the Mayor of Tormos during the 1930s.

== Biography ==
Jose Perelló Torrens was the first and only democratic mayor of the 20th century in Tormos prior to the restoration of democracy in 1978. It was on behalf of the party founded by Manuel Azaña, Acción Republicana (AR) and Izquierda Republicana (IR). During the hard times of the Spanish Civil War (1936–1939) he had an exemplary performance and not allowed any violent deaths in the town of Tormos as well reflected in the "Causa General" or Franco judicial inquiry into the crimes in the "red zone" during the war. The most remarkable action of José Perelló Torrens was to hide in a Tormos house the whole persecuted community of Carmelitas nuns arrived from Denia at the beginning of the Civil War. He also avoid the crimes of the parish priest and the town's richest owners facing himself the criminals of labour union CNT who wanted to kill them. After the Civil War the Major was accused by the local chief of the Falange party and sent to a prison. The parish priest and son of the village of Tormos, the escolapio Luis Ripoll Ginestar, was the only postrepublican authority of the town who intermediated in the liberation of the Mayor of the concentration camp of Porta-Coeli (Valencia), avoiding certain death.

In November 2009 his great-grandson managed, in the framework of the law of historical memory of Spain (2007), a statement of moral reparation and personal recognition by the Ministry of Justice, awarded to those who unjustly suffered persecution or violence during the Civil war and Franco's dictatorship. They have also received the same recognition, among others, Miguel Hernández and Lluís Companys. In November 2011 the Tormos city council decided to give the name "Alcalde José Perelló Torrens" to a new street as an act of recognition to the labour of José Perelló Torrens.

Other data of interest are that Jose Perelló Torrens emigrated to America, arriving at Ellis Island (New York) on February 14, 1917, aboard the ship "Antonio Lopez" that had left the port of Valencia. His son, José Perelló Ballester (1913–1939), enlisted in the battalion "Alicante Rojo" in August 1936, participated in the battle of Sigüenza (August–October 1936). Corps of the army was subsequently framed in the 71 ª mixed Brigade of the 12th Division of the IV, fighting in the Battle of Guadalajara (March 1937) against the Corpo Truppe Volontarie sent by Benito Mussolini to Spain. He later formed part of the 113 ª mixed Brigade of 36 Division of the VII Corps of the people's Republic Army (EPR), fighting in Extremadura. He studied at the Popular School of war no.3 infantry located in Paterna (Valencia) reaching the rank of Lieutenant in campaign in August 1938.

== See also ==
- ES:José Perelló Torrens (in Spanish)
