= Marcelino Perelló Valls =

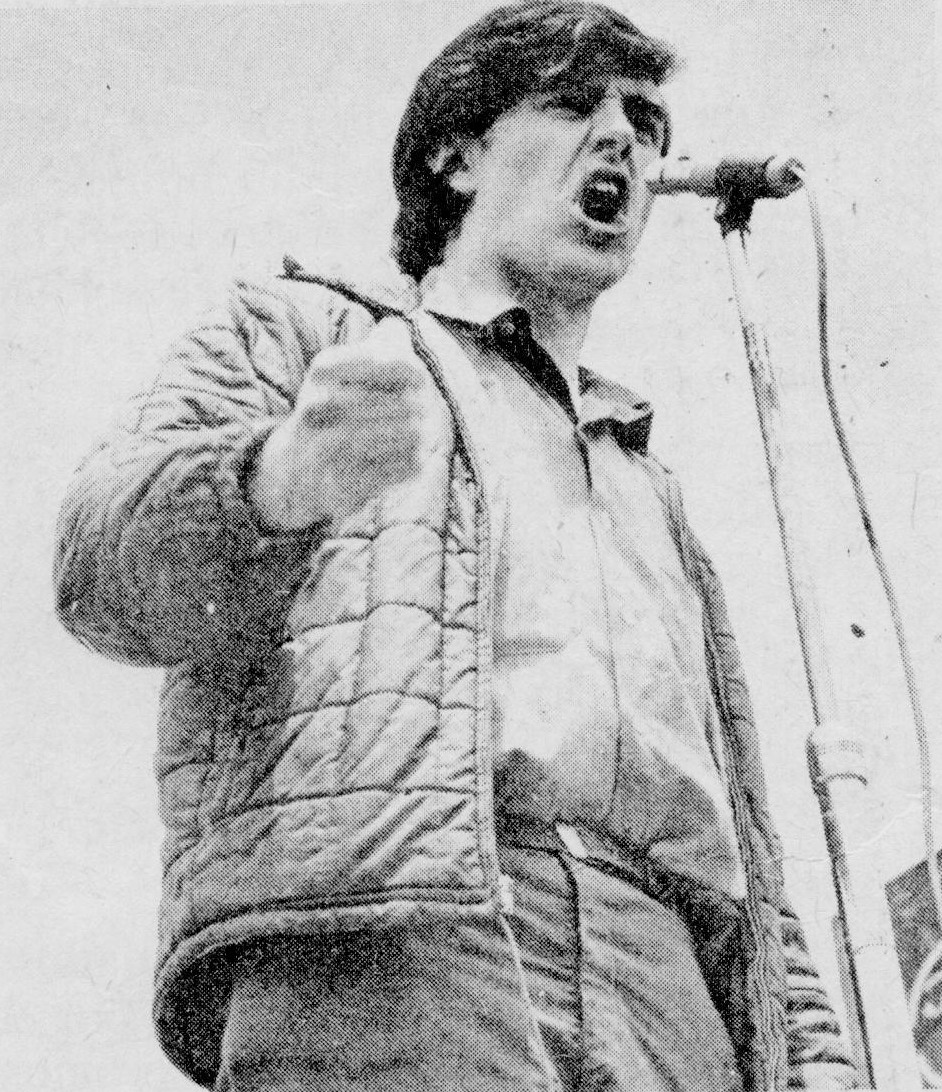
Perelló at the microphone.

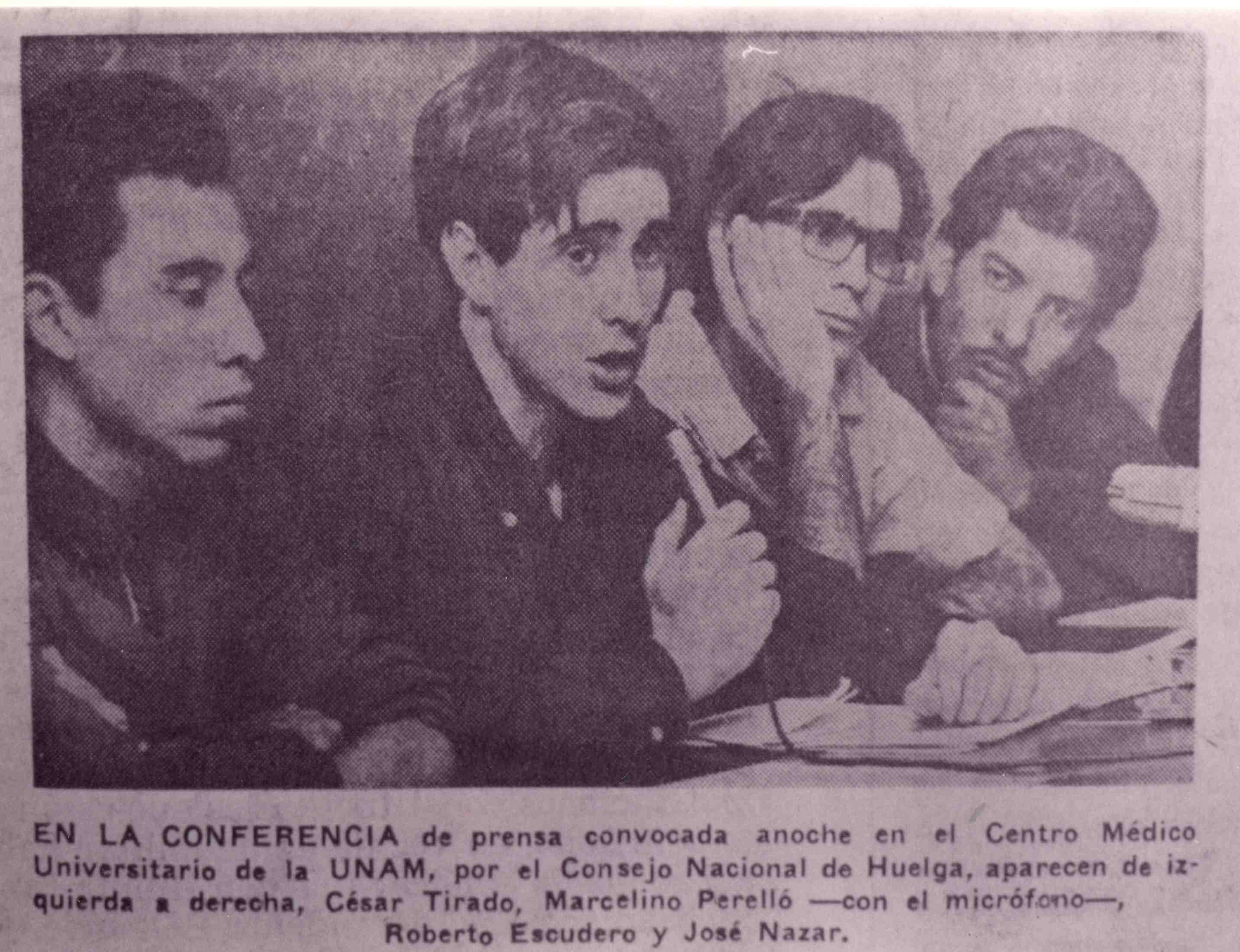
From left to right: César Tirado, Marcelino Perelló, Roberto Escudero and José Nazar.

Marcelino Perelló Valls (1944 – 5 August 2017) was a figure of the Mexican Student Movement of 1968, and the representative of the School of Sciences of the National Autonomous University of Mexico (UNAM) to the National Strike Council (CNH). Perelló was a member of the Mexican Communist Party (PCM) from 1965 until his death in 2017.

At the beginning of the movement, he was arrested on July 27 after the police raided the PCM’s semi-clandestine premises on Mérida street on July 26, 1968, in Mexico City; he was released next day because his political connections.

After the Tlatelolco massacre, he hid in Europe the following year; he was in exile for 16 years. He was in France, Romania and Spain, and in 1975 he graduated in Mathematics from the University of Bucharest, and two years later he obtained a master's degree in Science from the same institution.

As a professor, he taught at the University of Barcelona from 1977 to 1985; at the Autonomous University of Sinaloa from 1985 to 1986, and at the Autonomous University of Puebla, from 1987 to 1988. He was a professor at the School of Sciences of the UNAM, from 1990 on, where earlier he was a Physics student. During his student participation at the UNAM, he was a representative at the Consejo Nacional de Huelga, and part of the top leadership during Mexico 68's movement.

At the time of his death, Marcelino Perelló was the Secretary General of the Museo Universitario del Chopo. He was also a contributor to the newspaper Excélsior. and a columnist and a writer.

== Controversy ==
Perelló had a weekly radio show on Radio UNAM, called "Sentido contrario" (roughly translated as "The Wrong Direction"), that was cancelled after he made derisive comments in reference to the case of "The Porkys of Veracruz," a group of four men belonging to upper-class families who had allegedly gang raped a woman in Boca del Río, Veracruz in January 2015. Perelló made several derisive declarations including that the victim overreacted, that penetrating a woman against her will with "broomsticks, fingers or vibrators" is under current law not considered rape, but molestation or sexual abuse, and that some women could only achieve climax during rape.
