= Rossend Perelló =

Catalan writer

Rossend Perelló i Casellas (Gironella, 1912 — Barcelona, 13 April 1976) was a Catalan writer.

He took part in several literature contests. He had three children with his wife Maria Assumpta Losa Ortiz de Arril: Maria Rosa, Esperança and Carles.

== Prizes ==
- Flor Natural, Jocs Florals de Montblanc, 1956
- Premi Joan Santamaria, 1960, Bob, fanalet vermell.

== Works ==
=== Poetry ===
- L'enyor i les noces (1935)
- Camí de Maria (1948)
- Bonics (1952)

=== Novel ===
- El president signa els dimarts (1954)

=== Theatre ===
- Tres de servei (1958)
