= National Strike Council =

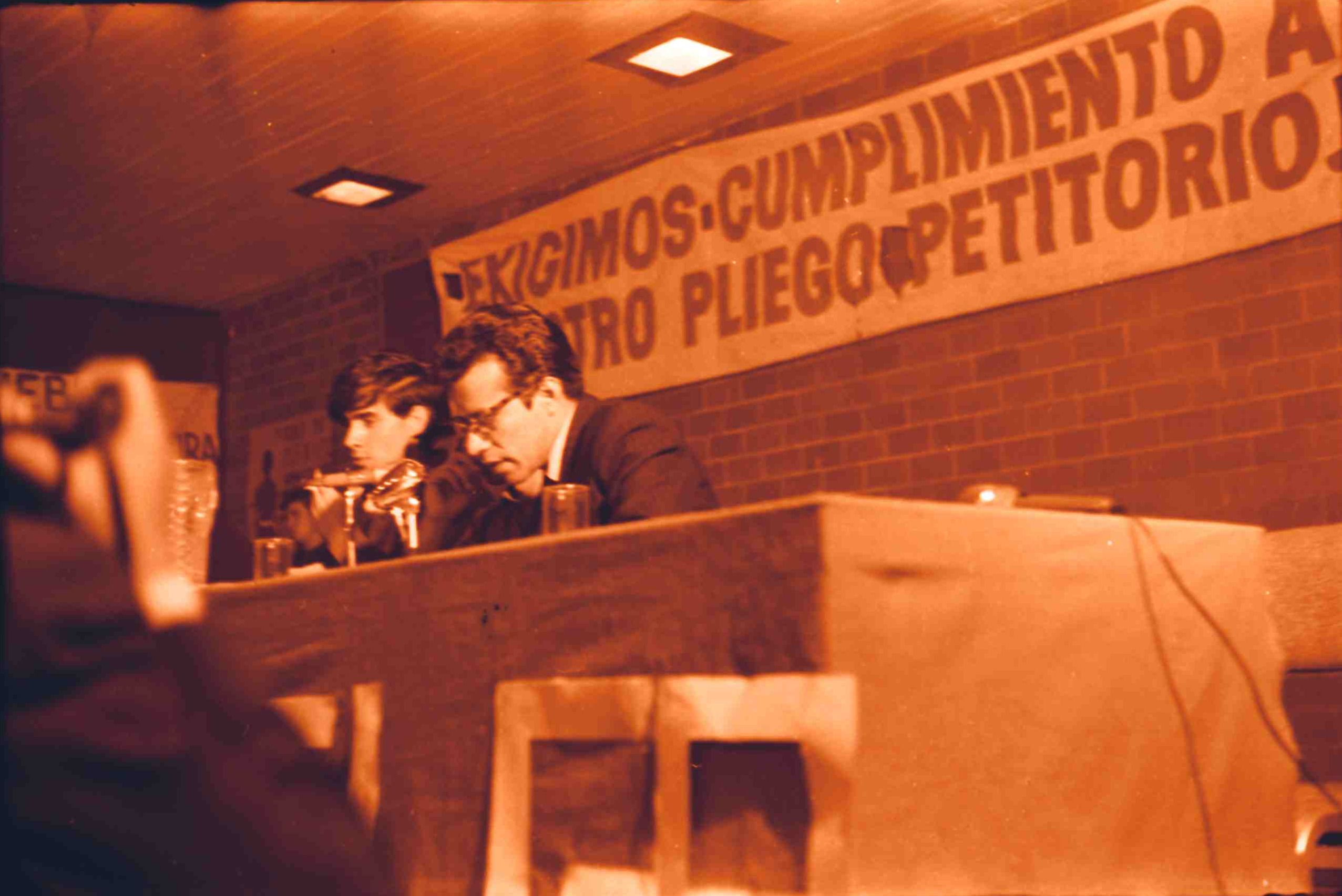
Cabeza de Vaca and Perelló at a press conference. (Mexico, 1968)

The National Strike Council, the Consejo Nacional de Huelga (CNH) was created on August 2, 1968, composed of the National Autonomous University of Mexico (UNAM), the National Polytechnic Institute (IPN), El Colegio de Mexico, the School of Agriculture of Chapingo, the Universidad Iberoamericana, the Universidad La Salle and other universities in Mexico.

It was created in response to developments against the student community, such as the intervention of the army in a confrontation between students of the Vocational School #2 (IPN) and the preparatory high school "Isaac Ochenterena" incorporated to the UNAM, in which several students from both schools were detained and the destruction caused by a bazooka used by the army at the entrance of the high school at the Colegio de San Ildefonso.

The strike council was democratic and participatory and sought engagement with the Mexican government and Mexicans in a public dialog. Their insistence on transparency was crucial for maintaining the support of their base and anathema to the government's typical deal-making in private.

== Structure and mechanisms for participation ==
The student movement established two basic instances of participation: 1.- Plenary Assembly in schools and 2.- The National Strike Council. The representatives before the National Strike Council were elected or revoked by the struggle committees of each school through the holding of plenary assemblies. It was initially established three representatives per school on strike but then with the increase of the same was reduced two. In the local assemblies of the schools agreements were reached that were taken to the plenary of the council, then the decisions taken in the council were taken to the assemblies of each school to be ratified and put into operation. Decisions in the National Strike Council were taken by simple majority and were followed by all delegates.

The National Strike Council established six work commissions: (1) Relations with the Province; (2) Brigades; (3)Propaganda; (4) Finance; (5) Information; (6) Legal issues. The commissions were composed of two representatives from the UNAM, two from the Polytechnic, one from Chapingo and another from the National School of Teachers.

== Demands ==
The occupation by the army of the Ciudad Universitaria (University City). Freedom to political prisoners including Demetrio Vallejo. Bazooka shot at Colegio de San Ildefonso before National Preparatory School. Repression in the confrontation between students of National Polytechnic Institute (IPN) and the preparatorio named for Isaac Ochoterena affiliated with the National Autonomous University of Mexico (UNAM). Occupation of several campuses of the National Autonomous University Mexico and Vocational School #5 (IPN).

The CNH elaborated a six-point petition issued on 4 August 1968 :

1. Repeal of Articles 145 and 145b of the Penal Code (which sanctioned imprisonment of anyone attending meetings of three or more people, deemed to threaten public order).
2. The abolition of granaderos (the tactical police corps).
3. Freedom for political prisoners.
4. The identification of officials responsible for previous bloodshed (including July and August meetings)
5. Payments to those injured in protests
6. The dismissal of the two most important police officials in Mexico City, chief of police, Luis Cueto, his deputy, Raúl Mendiolea, and the granandero commander, General A. Frías.

Ideologies: Pacifism, democratic socialism, communism, anti-fascism, anti-authoritarianism.

== Representatives, members and leaders ==
- Cervantes Cabeza de Vaca
- Marcelino Perelló
- Eduardo Valle
- Gilberto Guevara Niebla
- Roberto Escudero
- Félix Hernández Gamundi
- Raúl Álvarez Garín
- Luis González de Alba

== See also ==
- Tlatelolco massacre
