= Gironella =

- Municipality
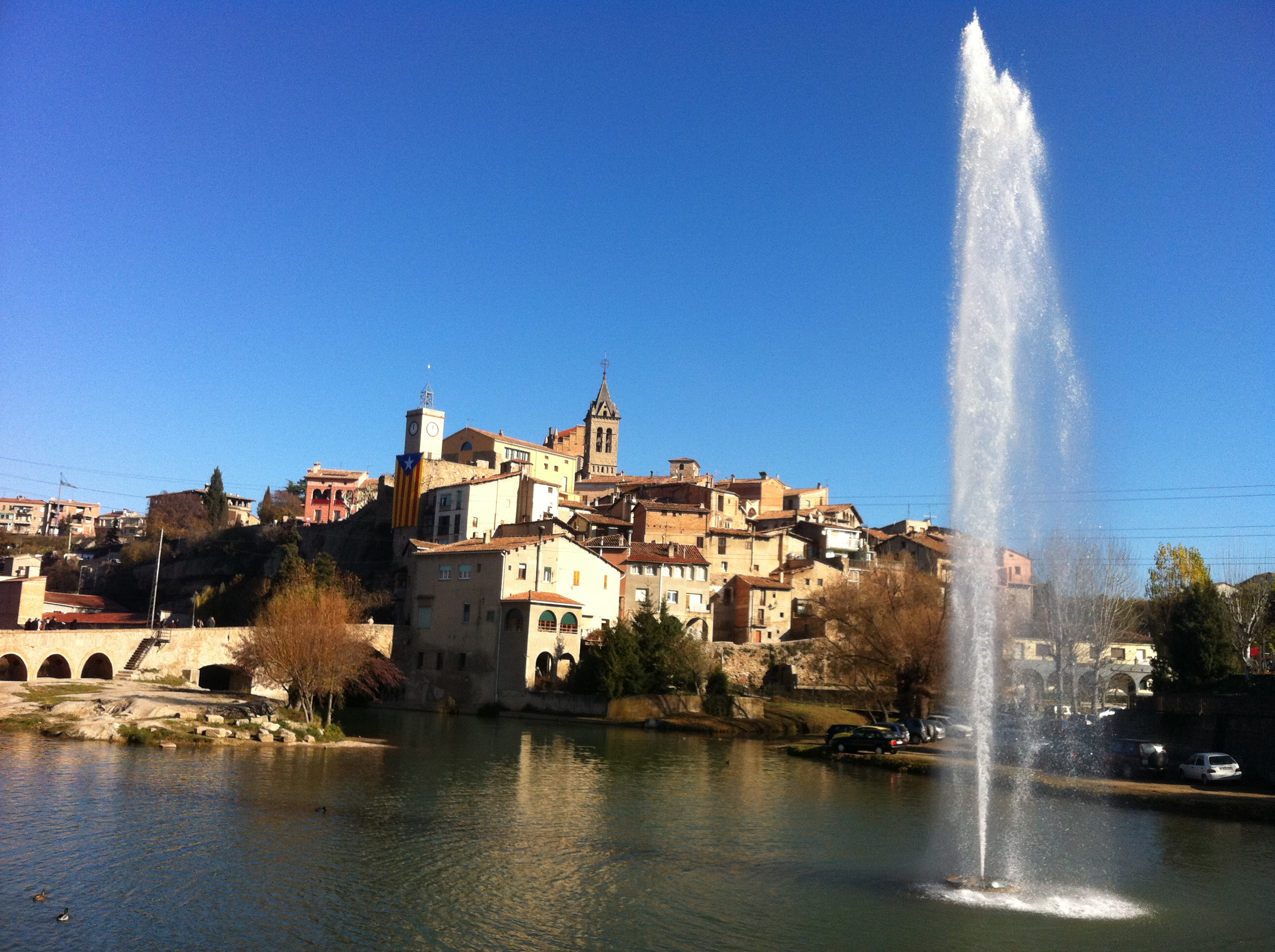

- Flag Coat of arms

- Location in Catalonia Gironella (Spain)
- Coordinates: 42°02′N 1°53′E
- Country: Spain
- Community: Catalonia
- Province: Barcelona
- Comarca: Berguedà

Government
  - Mayor: David Font Simon (2015) (CiU)

Area
  - Total: 6.8 km^{2} (2.6 sq mi)
- Elevation: 469 m (1,539 ft)

Population (2025-01-01)
  - Total: 5,083
  - Density: 750/km^{2} (1,900/sq mi)
- Demonym(s): Gironellenc, gironellenca
- Website: gironella.cat

Gironella (Catalan pronunciation: [ʒiɾuˈneʎə]) is a municipality in the comarca of the Berguedà in Catalonia, Spain. It is situated in the left bank of the Llobregat river to the south of Berga. The local economy is traditionally based on cotton spinning and textile manufacture, although tourism is now more important: the company towns or "colonies" of workers houses surround the cotton mills are of historical interest. The town is served by the C-16 road to Berga and the Cadí tunnel. Gironella, which has numerous stores, bars, and schools, is an important economic center for the smaller towns around it, such as Olvan, Sagàs or Casserres.

The town is mentioned in a well-known traditional Catalan song, A Gironella or Cançó de Gironella, in which a young man laments being rejected by his beloved and being forced to leave the town behind.

== History ==
=== Prehistory and ancient history ===
No prehistoric archeological sites have been found in the municipality of Gironella therefore no traceability to ancient times has been possible. However, Rosa Serra states that the situation of the inhabitants of Gironella should have been the same as the people living in the area of Baix Berguedà.

Human habitats have been found in the region from Neolithic and there are several Iberian sites (Puig-reig, Santa Maria de Merlès, Montclar, L'Espunyola, Berga, Casserres etc.). During the restoration of the old church of Santa Eulàlia of Gironella, pottery remains belonging to different times were found. Among them, there was a local Iberian piece of ceramic and another belonging to Roses workshop, both dating from before the third century BC. This finding shows the settlement in the area from the protohistoric times.

The present municipality of Gironella was crossed by a salt path which connected the salt mountain of Cardona (a deposit of rock salt, where the salt forms a mountain mass) with the eastern part of Catalonia.

=== Medieval history ===
In the High Middle Ages the population of El Berguedà was relatively stable, especially in the mountain areas and the Germanic and Muslim invasions did not leave a strong mark.

=== Modern history ===
==== Gironella in the war of Spanish Succession ====
Gironella had fallen into the hands of the Bourbon army, but on 11 March 1714 the village was released during the seizure of Gironella Castle by the troops of the Marquis of Poal and Colonel Ermengol Amill. The Bourbon garrison, consisting of 30 soldiers, 2 captains and 2 lieutenants, among others, were imprisoned in Cardona.

== Demography ==
1900	1930	1950	1970	1986	2007
2953	4505	4410	5703	5360	4844

== Notable inhabitants ==
- Vicenç Navarro
- Rossend Perelló (1912—1976), Catalan writer
