= Casserres =

- Municipality
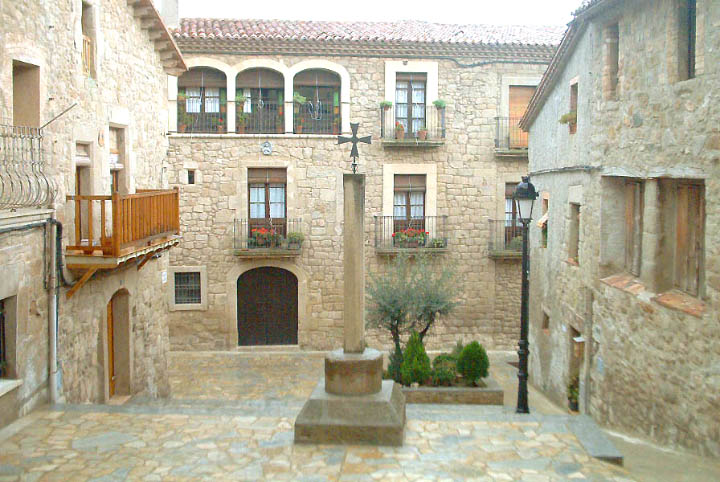

- Coat of arms

- Location in Catalonia Casserres (Spain)
- Coordinates: 42°0′54″N 1°50′36″E
- Country: Spain
- Community: Catalonia
- Province: Barcelona
- Comarca: Berguedà

Government
  - Mayor: Josep Colillas Sabartés (2015) (ERC-AM)

Area
  - Total: 29.5 km^{2} (11.4 sq mi)
- Elevation: 611 m (2,005 ft)

Population (2025-01-01)
  - Total: 1,660
  - Density: 56.3/km^{2} (146/sq mi)
- Demonym(s): Casserrenc, casserrenca
- Website: casserres.cat

Casserres (Catalan pronunciation: [kəˈsɛrəs]) is a town and municipality in the comarca of Berguedà, Catalonia, a part of the Baix Berguedà region. The town is named after the medieval castle, named Castrum Serris.

== Geography ==
The town is situated 12 kilometers from the comarcal capital of Berga, and two streams, the Clarà and Meriola, pass through the municipal limits. The Llobregat river comprises one of its borders.

Dryland farming is prevalent in Casserres, with most agriculture focusing on cereals and potatoes, as well as animal herding.

== Sites of interest ==
- Church of the Mare de Déu dels Àngels, from the 14th century. Includes a Baroque altar from 1704.
- Church of Sant Pau de Casserres, from the 12th century. Its murals are conserved in the Museu Diocesà de Solsona
- Neo-Gothic church of l'Ametlla de Casserres
- Hermitage of Sant Miquel de Fonogadell, romanesque.
- Remains of the Iberian settlement of el Serrat dels Tres Hereus.
