= Barcelona =

- City and municipality
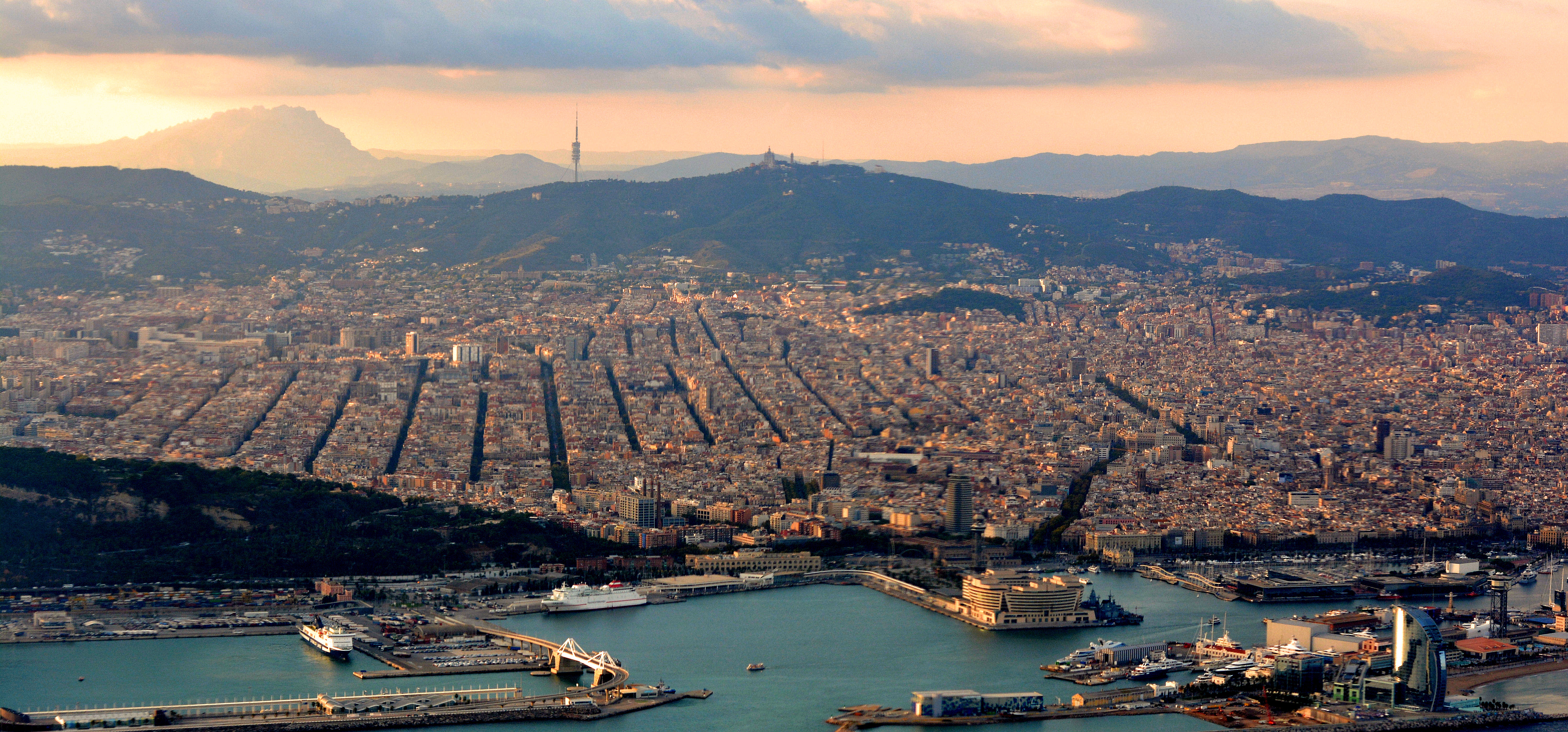
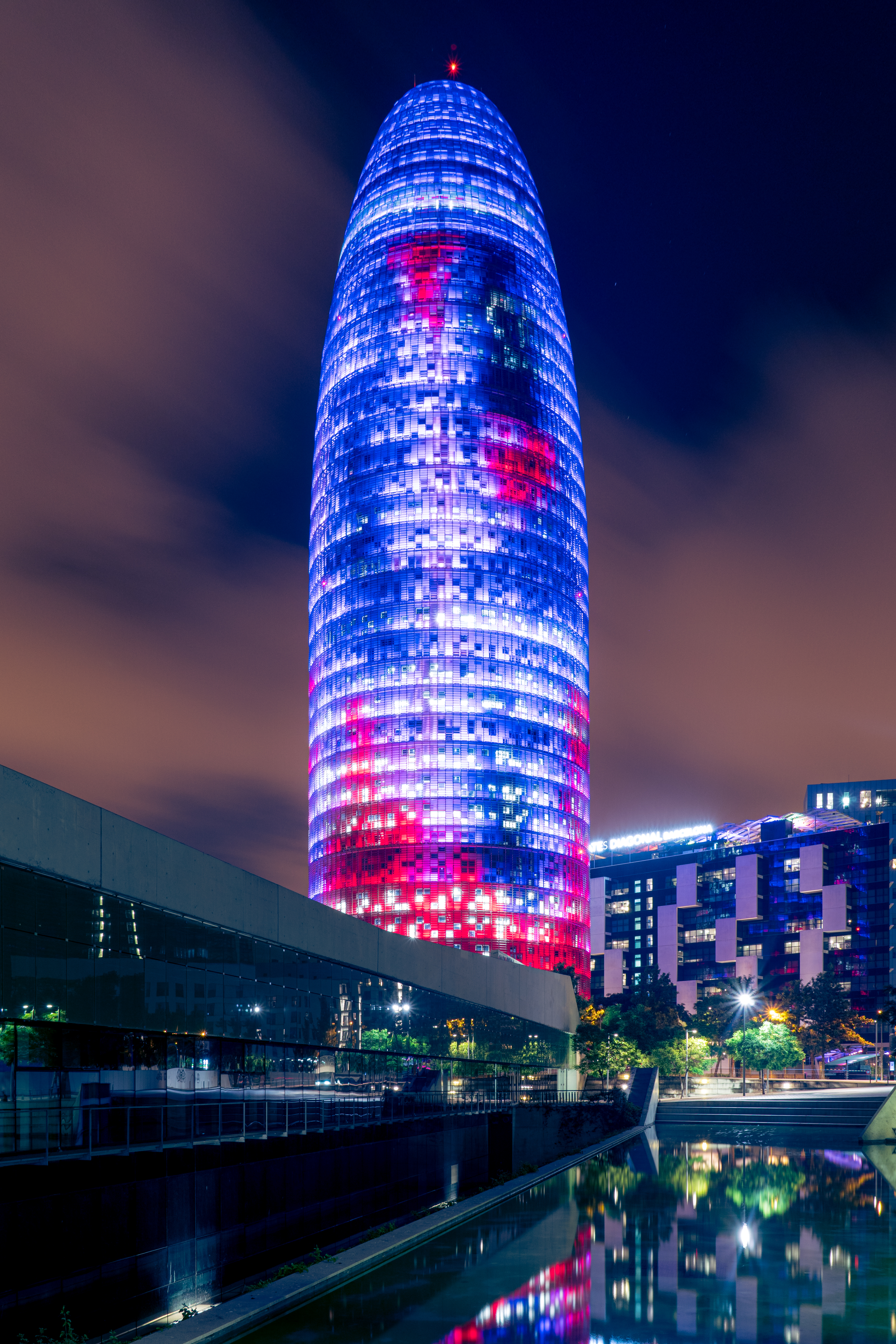
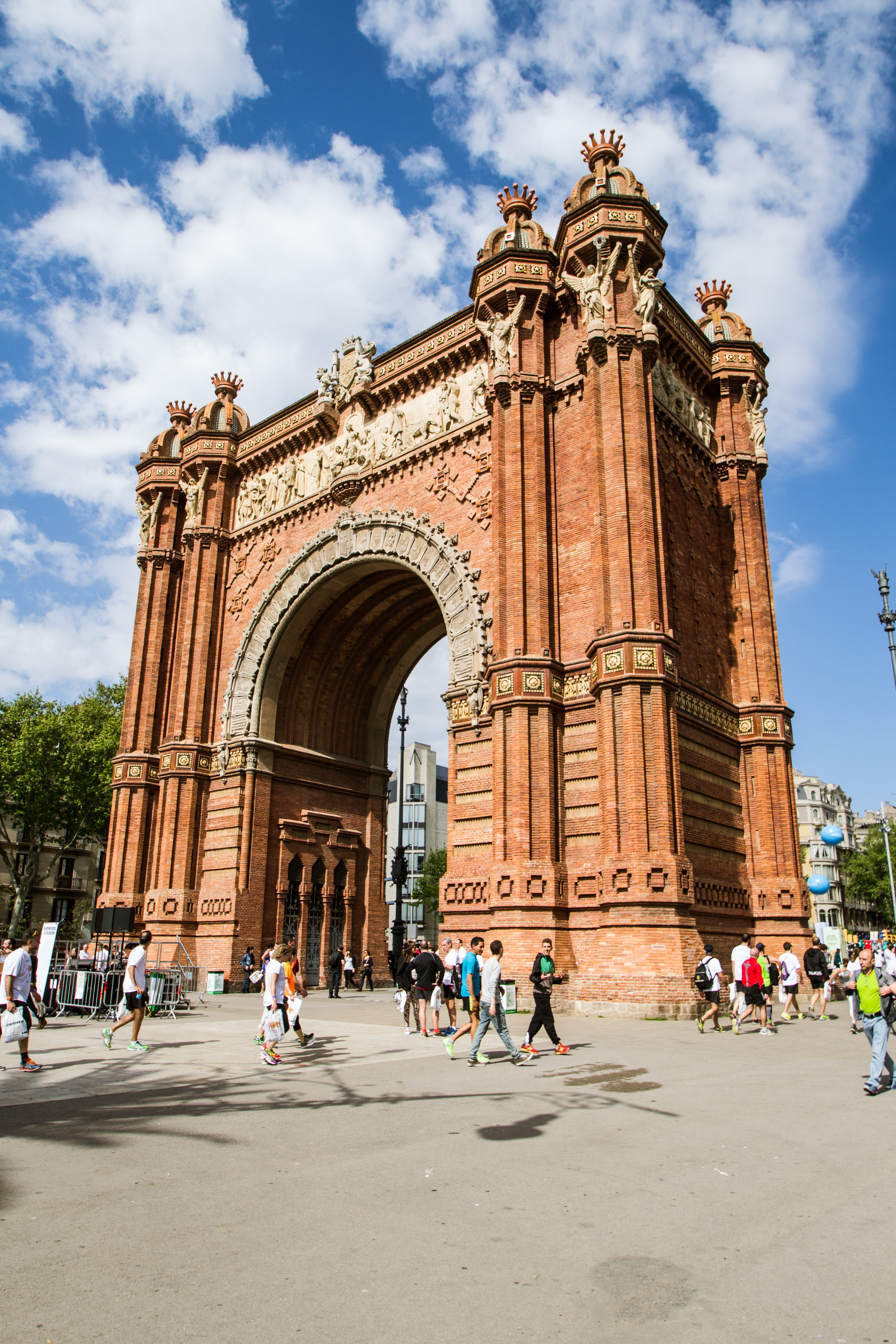
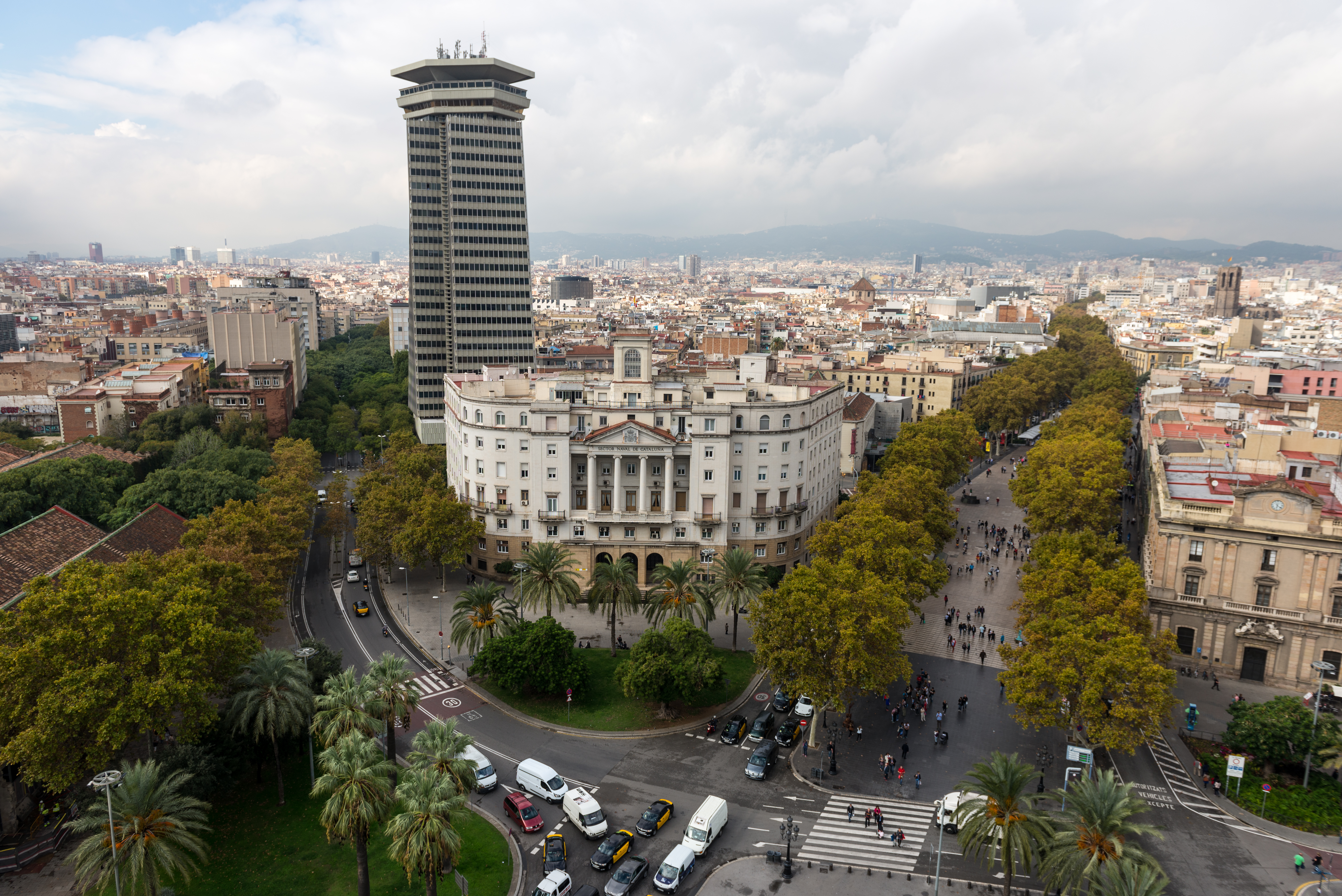
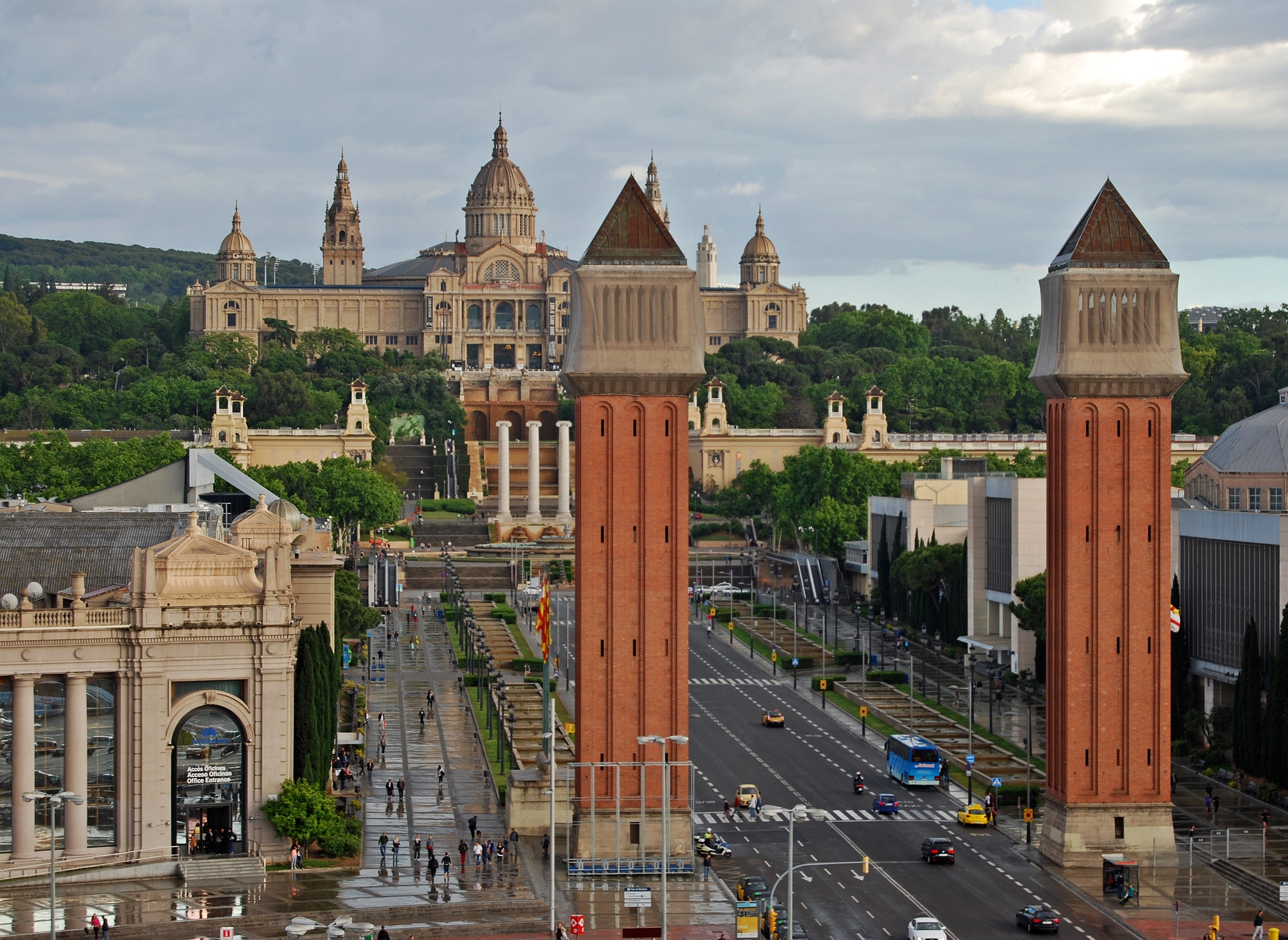
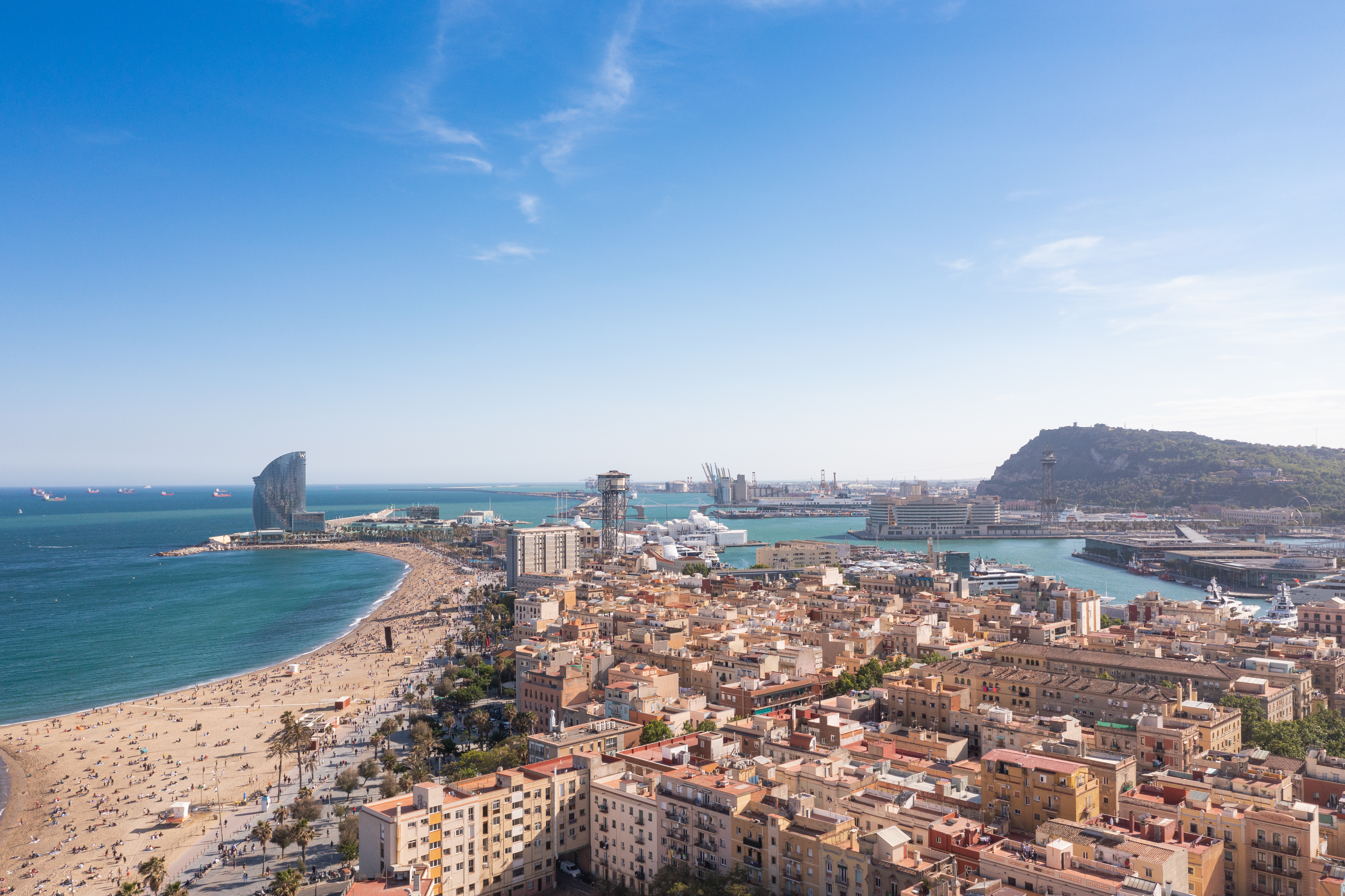
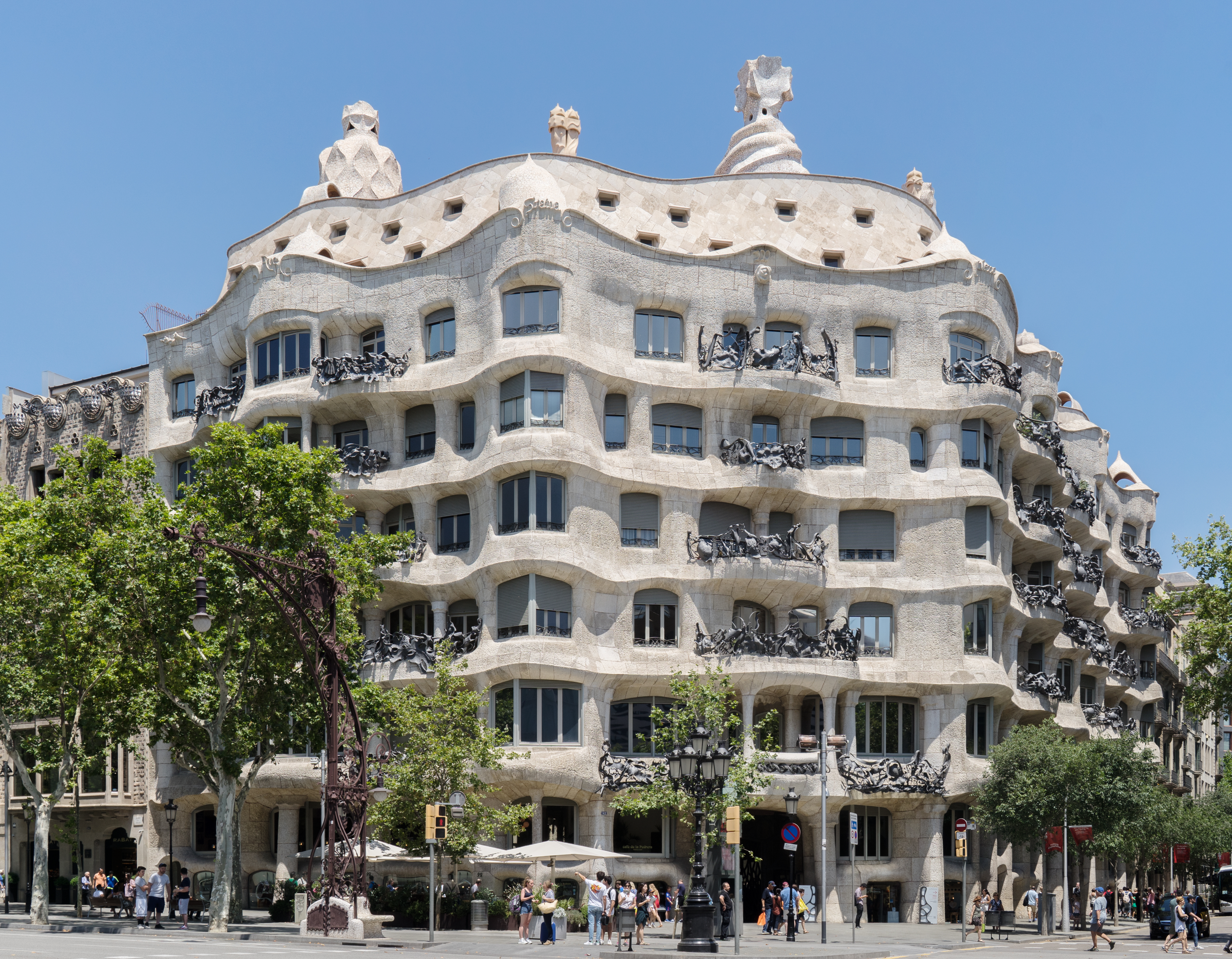
- Skyline of Barcelona Sagrada Família Torre Glòries Arc de Triomf Edificio Colón and La Rambla Venetian Towers and Palau Nacional La Barceloneta Casa Milà

- Flag Coat of arms
- Nicknames: Ciutat Comtal (Catalan); Ciudad Condal (Spanish) "Comital City" or "City of Counts" Cap i Casal de Catalunya (Catalan) 'Head and Hearth of Catalonia' Abbreviation(s): Barna, BCN
- Interactive map of Barcelona
- Location within Catalonia Location within Spain Location within Europe
- Coordinates: 41°22′58″N 2°10′37″E
- Country: Spain
- Autonomous Community: Catalonia
- Province: Barcelona
- Comarca: Barcelonès
- Districts: 10 districts: Ciutat Vella; Eixample; Gràcia; Horta-Guinardó; Les Corts; Nou Barris; Sant Andreu; Sants–Montjuïc; Sarrià-Sant Gervasi; Sant Martí

Government
  - Type: Ajuntament
  - Body: City Council of Barcelona
  - Mayor: Jaume Collboni (PSC)

Area
  - City: 100.68 km^{2} (38.87 sq mi)
- Elevation (AMSL): 12 m (39 ft)
- Highest elevation (Tibidabo): 512 m (1,680 ft)
- Lowest elevation (Mediterranean Sea): 0 m (0 ft)

Population (2025)
  - City: 1,713,247
  - Rank: 2nd in Spain
  - Density: 17,017/km^{2} (44,073/sq mi)
  - Urban: 4,840,000
  - Metro: 5,474,482
- Demonyms: Barcelonan or Barcelonian • barceloní, -ina (Cat.) • barcelonés, -esa (Sp.)
- Official language(s): Catalan; Spanish

GDP
  - Metro: €173.722 billion (2021)
- City budget (2023): €3.6 billion
- Postal code: 080xx
- Area code: +34 (ES); 93- / 83- (B)
- ISO 3166-2: ES-B
- INE code: 08 0193
- Main festivity: La Mercè
- Patron saint: Eulalia
- Website: barcelona.cat

Barcelona (Note: Pronunciation: English: /ˌbɑːrsəˈloʊnə/ BAR-sə-LOH-nə; Catalan: [bəɾsəˈlonə]; Spanish: [baɾθeˈlona].) is a city on the northeastern coast of Spain. It is the capital and largest city of the autonomous community of Catalonia, as well as the second-most populous municipality of Spain after Madrid. With a population of 1.7 million within city limits, its urban area extends to numerous neighbouring municipalities within the province of Barcelona and is home to around 5.7 million people, making it the fifth most populous urban area of the European Union after Paris, the Ruhr area, Madrid, and Milan. It is one of the largest metropolises on the Mediterranean Sea, located on the coast between the mouths of the rivers Llobregat and Besòs, and bounded to the west by the Serra de Collserola mountain range.

According to tradition, Barcelona was founded by either the Phoenicians or the Carthaginians, who had trading posts along the Catalonian coast. In the Middle Ages, Barcelona became the capital of the County of Barcelona. After the dynastic union with the Kingdom of Aragon to form the composite monarchy of the Crown of Aragon, Barcelona, which remained the capital of the Principality of Catalonia, became the most important city in the Crown of Aragon and its main economic and administrative centre, only to be overtaken by Valencia, wrested from Moorish control by the Catalans, shortly before the dynastic union between the Crown of Castile and the Crown of Aragon in 1516. Barcelona became the centre of Catalan separatism, briefly becoming part of France during the 17th century Reapers' War and again from 1812 to 1814 under Napoleon.

Experiencing industrialization and several workers movements and political turmoil during the 19th and early 20th century, it became the capital of autonomous Catalonia in 1931 and was the epicenter of the revolution experienced by Catalonia during the Spanish Revolution of 1936, until its capture by the fascists in 1939. After the Spanish transition to democracy in the 1970s, Barcelona once again became the capital of an autonomous Catalonia. Barcelona has a rich cultural heritage and is today an important cultural centre and a major tourist destination. Particularly renowned are the architectural works of Antoni Gaudí and Lluís Domènech i Montaner, which have been designated UNESCO World Heritage Sites. The city is home to two of the most prestigious universities in Spain: the University of Barcelona and Pompeu Fabra University. The headquarters of the Union for the Mediterranean are located in Barcelona. The city is known for hosting the 1992 Summer Olympics as well as world-class conferences and expositions. In addition, many international sport tournaments have been played here. Barcelona is also the home of the football club Barcelona.

Barcelona is a major cultural, economic, and financial centre in southwestern Europe, as well as the main biotech hub in Spain. As a leading world city, Barcelona's influence in global socio-economic affairs qualifies it for global city status (Beta +). Barcelona is a transport hub, with the Port of Barcelona, one of Europe's principal seaports and the busiest European passenger port, an international airport, Barcelona–El Prat Airport, which handles over 50 million passengers per year, an extensive motorway network, and a high-speed rail line with links to France and the rest of Europe.

== Names ==
The name Barcelona comes from the ancient Iberian Baŕkeno, attested in an ancient coin inscription found on the right side of the coin in Iberian script as, in Ancient Greek sources as Βαρκινών, Barkinṓn; and in Latin as Barcino, Barcilonum and Barcenona.

Other sources suggest that the city may have been named after the Carthaginian general Hamilcar Barca, who was supposed to have founded the city in the 3rd century BC, but there is no evidence that its name in antiquity, Barcino, was connected with the Barcid family of Hamilcar. During the Middle Ages, the city was variously known as Barchinona, Barçalona, Barchelonaa, and Barchenona.

An abbreviated form sometimes used by locals for the city is Barna. Barça is only applied to the local football club FC Barcelona, not to the city. Another common abbreviation is 'BCN', which is also the IATA airport code of the Barcelona-El Prat Airport.

The city is referred to as the Ciutat Comtal in Catalan and Ciudad Condal in Spanish (i.e., "Comital City" or "City of Counts"), owing to its past as the seat of the Count of Barcelona.

== History ==
=== Legendary founding ===
The origin of the earliest settlement at the site of present-day Barcelona is unclear. The ruins of an early settlement have been found, including different tombs and dwellings dating to earlier than 5000 BC. In Greek mythology, the founding of Barcelona had been attributed to the mythological Hercules.

=== Punic Barcelona ===
According to tradition, Barcelona was founded by Punic (Phoenician) settlers, who had trading posts along the Catalonian coast. In particular, some historians attribute the foundation of the city directly to the historical Carthaginian general, Hamilcar Barca, father of Hannibal, who supposedly named the city Barcino after his family in the 3rd century BC, but this theory has been questioned. Iberia and Barcelona was controlled by the Carthaginian Empire and was an important location for trade due to its proximity to Punic Ibiza. Archeological evidence in the form of coins from the 3rd century BC have been found on the hills at the foot of Montjuïc with the name Bárkeno written in the Iberian script in the Iberian language. Thus, some have argued that the Laietani, an ancient Iberian (pre-Roman) people of the Iberian peninsula, who inhabited the area occupied by the city of Barcelona around 3–2 BC after the Punic withdrawal from Iberia, called the area Bàrkeno, which means "The Place of the Plains" (Barrke = plains/terrace).

=== Roman Barcelona ===
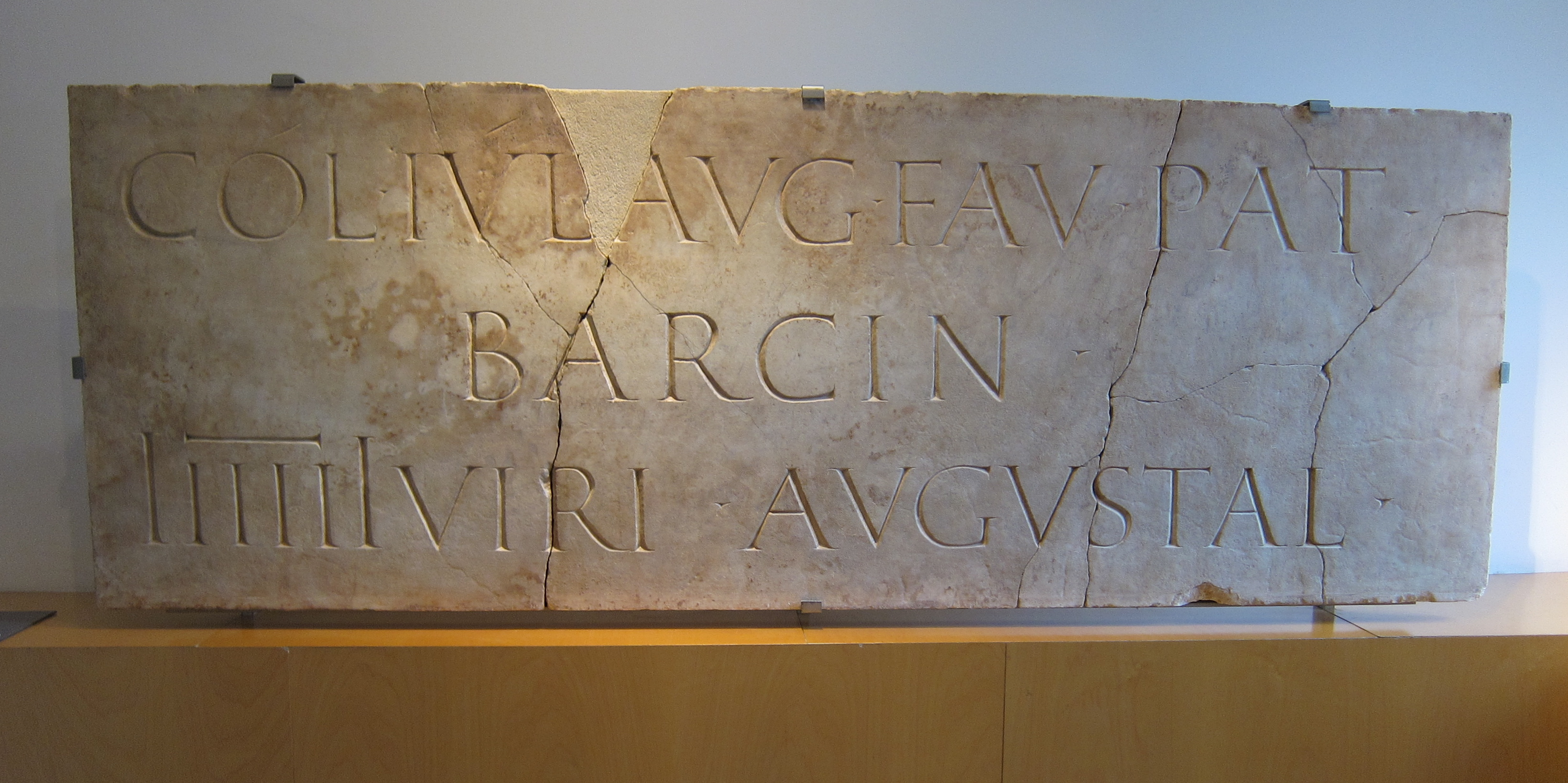
A marble plaque in the Museu d'Història de la Ciutat de Barcelona, dated from around 110–130 AD and dedicated to the Roman colony of Barcino

In about 15 BC, the Romans redrew the town as a castrum (Roman military camp) centred on the "Mons Taber", a little hill near the Generalitat (Catalan Government) and city hall buildings. The Roman Forum, at the crossing of the Cardo Maximus and Decumanus Maximus, was approximately placed where current Plaça de Sant Jaume is. Thus, the political centre of the city, Catalonia, and its domains has remained in the same place for over 2,000 years.

Under the Romans, it was a colony with the surname of Faventia, or, in full, Colonia Faventia Julia Augusta Pia Barcino or Colonia Julia Augusta Faventia Paterna Barcino. Pomponius Mela mentions it among the small towns of the district, probably as it was eclipsed by its neighbour Tarraco (modern Tarragona), but it may be gathered from later writers that it gradually grew in wealth and consequence, favoured as it was with a beautiful situation and an excellent harbour. It enjoyed immunity from imperial burdens. The city minted its own coins; some from the era of Galba survive.

Important Roman vestiges are displayed in Plaça del Rei underground, as a part of the Barcelona City History Museum (MUHBA); the typically Roman grid plan is still visible today in the layout of the historical centre, the Barri Gòtic (Gothic Quarter). Some remaining fragments of the Roman walls have been incorporated into the cathedral. The cathedral, Catedral Basílica Metropolitana de Barcelona, is also sometimes called La Seu, which simply means cathedral (and see, among other things) in Catalan. It is said to have been founded in 343.

=== Medieval Barcelona ===
The city was conquered by the Visigoths in the early 5th century, becoming for a few years the capital of all Hispania. After being conquered by the Umayyads in the early 8th century, it was conquered after a siege in 801 by Charlemagne's son Louis, who made Barcelona the seat of the Carolingian "Hispanic March" (Marca Hispanica), a buffer zone ruled by the Count of Barcelona.

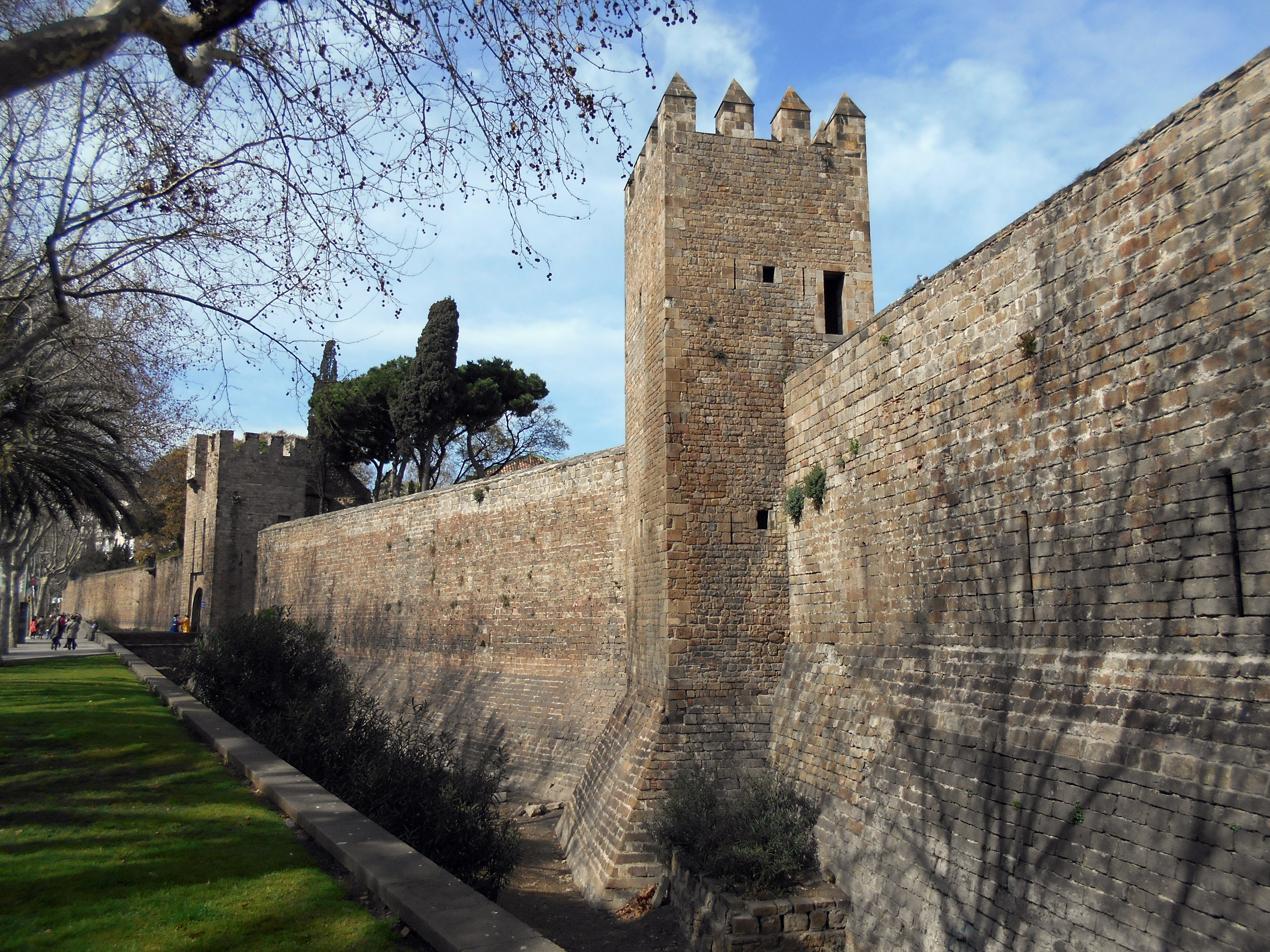
The remaining section of the medieval walls

The Counts of Barcelona became increasingly independent and expanded their territory to include much of modern Catalonia, although in 985, Barcelona was sacked by the army of Almanzor. The sack was so traumatic that most of Barcelona's population was either killed or enslaved. In 1137, Aragon and the County of Barcelona merged in dynastic union by the marriage of Ramon Berenguer IV and Petronilla of Aragon, their titles finally borne by only one person when their son Alfonso II of Aragon ascended to the throne in 1162. His territories were later to be known as the Crown of Aragon, which conquered many overseas possessions and ruled the western Mediterranean Sea with outlying territories in Naples and Sicily and as far as Athens in the 13th century.

Barcelona also had a substantial Jewish community at the time, then the largest Jewish community in the Crown of Aragon. Called "the Call," for the many small streets that defined the area, it later became enclosed. Montjuïc or Montjuich, in medieval Latin and Catalan, meaning "Jewish Mountain" and the birthplace of the city, is the site of a medieval Jewish cemetery, Jews continued to live in Barcelona until the Massacre of 1391 diminished their numbers. The Spanish Inquisition forced the remaining Jews who refused to convert to Christianity to be burned at the stake, or sell their property and leave.

Barcelona was the leading slave trade centre of the Crown of Aragon up until the 15th century, when it was eclipsed by Valencia. It initially fed from eastern and Balkan slave stock later drawing from a Maghribian and, ultimately, Subsaharan pool of slaves.

The Bank or Taula de canvi de Barcelona, often viewed as the oldest public bank in Europe, was established by the city magistrates in 1401. It originated from necessities of the state, as did the Bank of Venice (1402) and the Bank of Genoa (1407).

=== Barcelona under the Spanish monarchy ===
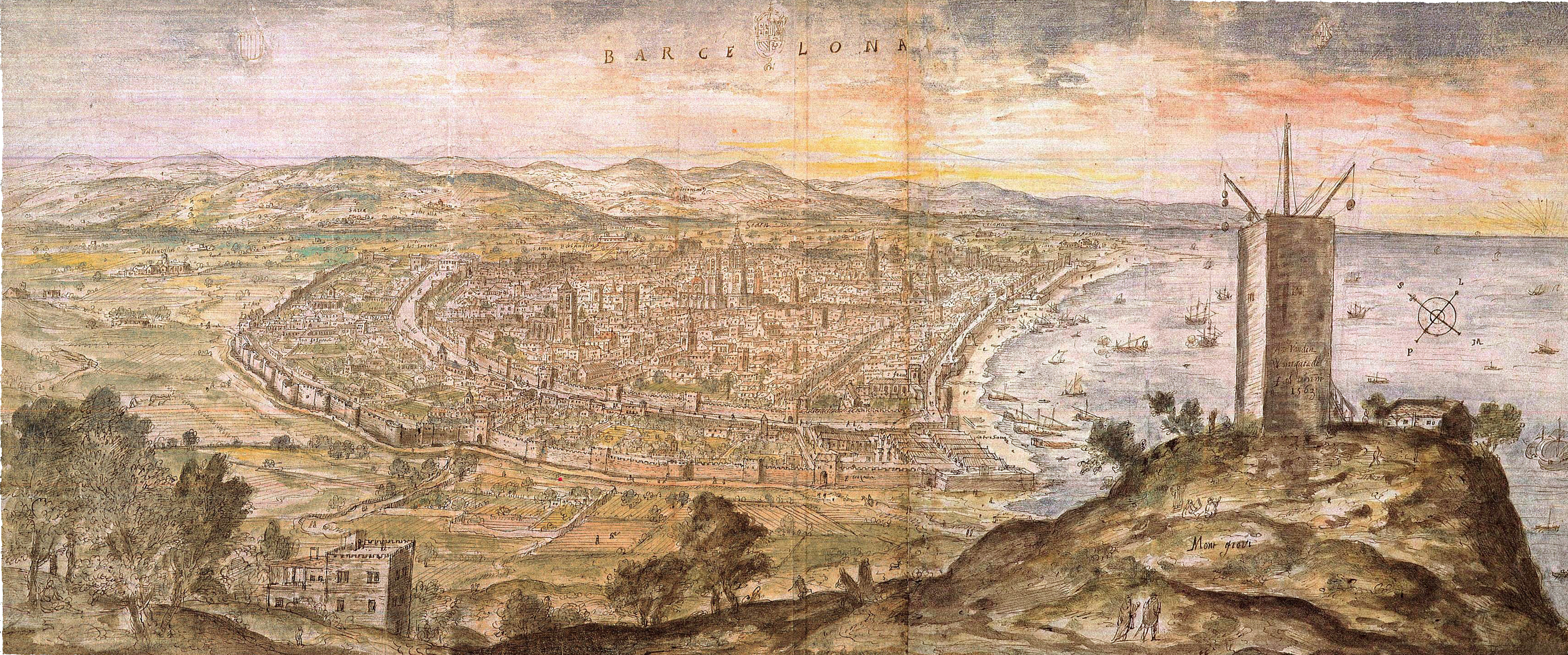
Barcelona in 1563 by Anton van den Wyngaerde

In the beginning of the early modern period, Barcelona lost political primacy, but the economy managed to achieve a balance between production capacity and imports. In the context of the wider early recovery of Catalonia from the 17th-century crisis in the second half of the century, increasing maritime activity since 1675 doubled traffic in the port of Barcelona compared to figures from the beginning of the 17th century. In the late 17th and early 18th century, Barcelona repeatedly endured the effects of war, including the 1691 bombing, the sieges of 1697, 1704, 1705, 1706, and the 1713 blockade and ensuing 1714 siege and assault. In the 18th century, the population grew from 30,000 to about 100,000 inhabitants, as the city became one of the key mercantile centres in the Western Mediterranean, with inland influence up to Zaragoza, and to the south up to Alicante. A fortress was built at Montjuïc that overlooked the harbour. Much of Barcelona was negatively affected by the Napoleonic wars, but the start of industrialization saw the fortunes of the province improve.

During the 19th century, Catalan business interests, many of them based in Barcelona, became increasingly involved in the Atlantic slave trade, taking advantage of the void left by the British abolition of the trade in 1807. Catalan immigrants in Spanish America also became heavily involved in owning and running slave plantations in Cuba and Puerto Rico. Between 1817 and 1867, Catalans were involved in the transportation of 700,000 slaves from West Africa to the Caribbean, which "financed much of the industrialisation of Catalonia and the 19th-century building boom in Barcelona." Although the Spanish government had abolished slave trading in 1817, it turned a blind eye to illicit slave trading. When slavery was abolished in the Spanish Empire in 1886, many Catalans returned to Barcelona and invested their newfound fortunes in constructing opulent mansions in areas such as La Rambla.

=== Transforming the city ===
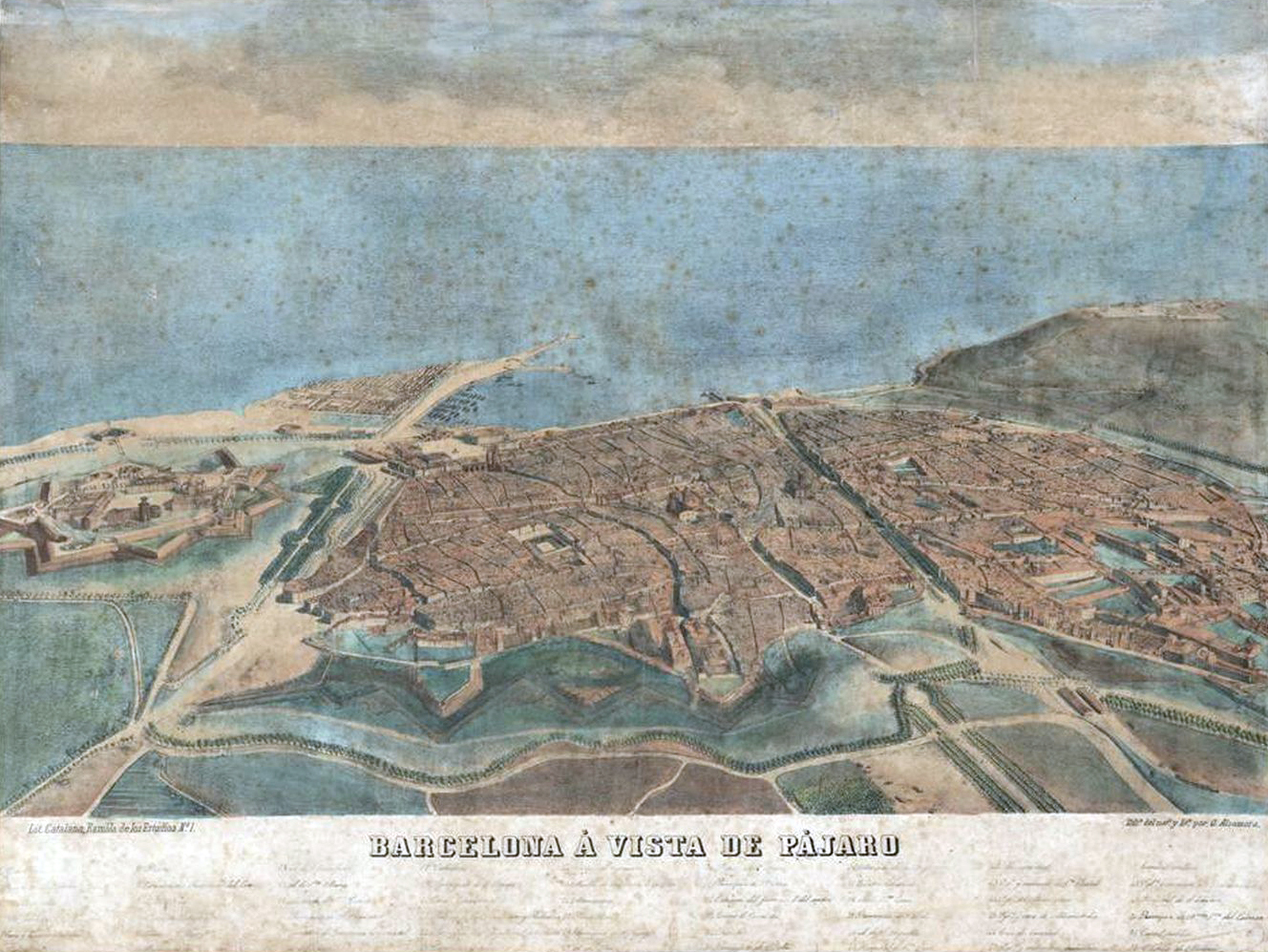
Barcelona before the Cerdà Plan (1857)

In the mid-1850s, Barcelona was struggling with population density as it became an industrial, port city and European capital. The city's density was at 856 people per hectare, more than double that of Paris. Mortality rates were on the rise and any outbreaks of disease would devastate the population. To solve the issue, a civil engineer named Ildefons Cerdà proposed a plan for a new district known as the Eixample. The citizens of Barcelona had begun to demolish the medieval wall surrounding and constricting the city. Cerdà thought it best to transform the land outside the walls into an area characterized by a scientific approach to urbanization. His proposal consisted of a grid of streets to unite the old city and surrounding villages. There would also be wide streets to allow people to breathe clean air, gardens in the centre of each street block, integration of rich and poor giving both groups access to the same services, and smooth-flowing traffic.

Urban quality, egalitarianism, hygiene, sunlight, and efficiency were all major keys for Cerdà's vision. Not everything he imagined would be realized within the Eixample district, but the iconic octagonal superblocks with chamfered corners for better visibility are his direct brainchild and remain immensely helpful even 170 years later. The district and its ideals were not appreciated at the time. The city council awarded the design of the extension plan to another architect. The Spanish government was the one to step in and impose Cerdà's plan, laying the groundwork for many more tensions between the Spanish and Catalan administrations. Regardless, some of the upper class citizens of Barcelona were excited by the new plan and began a race to build "the biggest, tallest, most attractive house" in the district. Their interest and money fueled the rich diversity that we now see in the district's architecture. In the end, Cerdà's ideas would have a lasting impact on Barcelona's development, earning it international recognition for its highly efficient approach to urban planning and design.

=== Spanish Civil War and Franco period ===
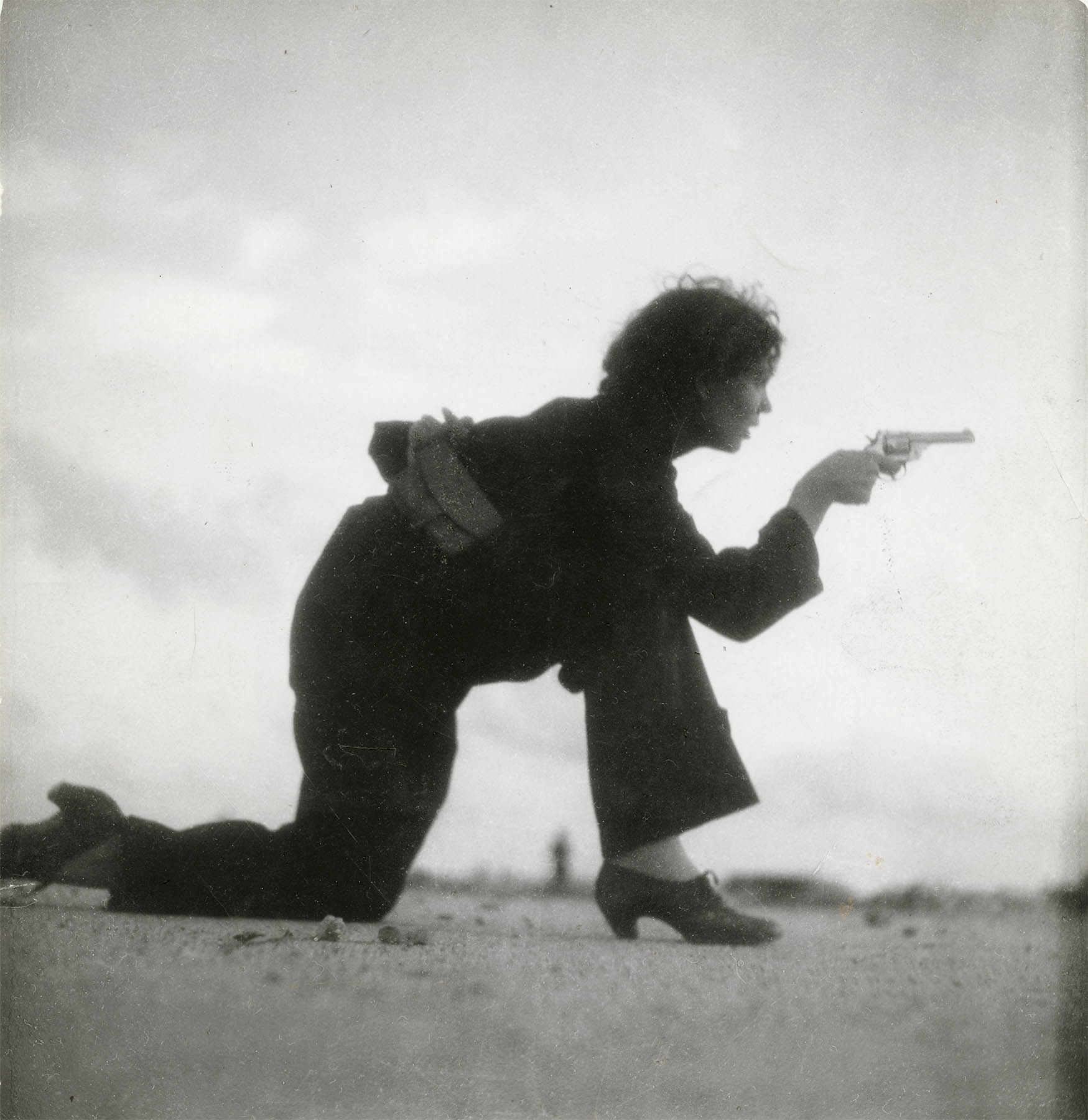
Woman training for a Republican militia by Gerda Taro, Somorrostro beach (1936)

Shortly after the establishment of the Second Spanish Republic, in 1931, it became the capital of the autonomous region of Catalonia. During the Spanish Civil War, the city, and Catalonia in general, were resolutely Republican. Many enterprises and public services were collectivized by the CNT and UGT unions. As the power of the Republican government and the Generalitat diminished, much of the city was under the effective control of anarchist groups. The anarchists lost control of the city to their own allies, the Communists and official government troops, after the street fighting of the Barcelona May Days.

Barcelona was one of the last places in Spain to fall under Francoist control, and became the capital of the Second Spanish Republic in November 1937.

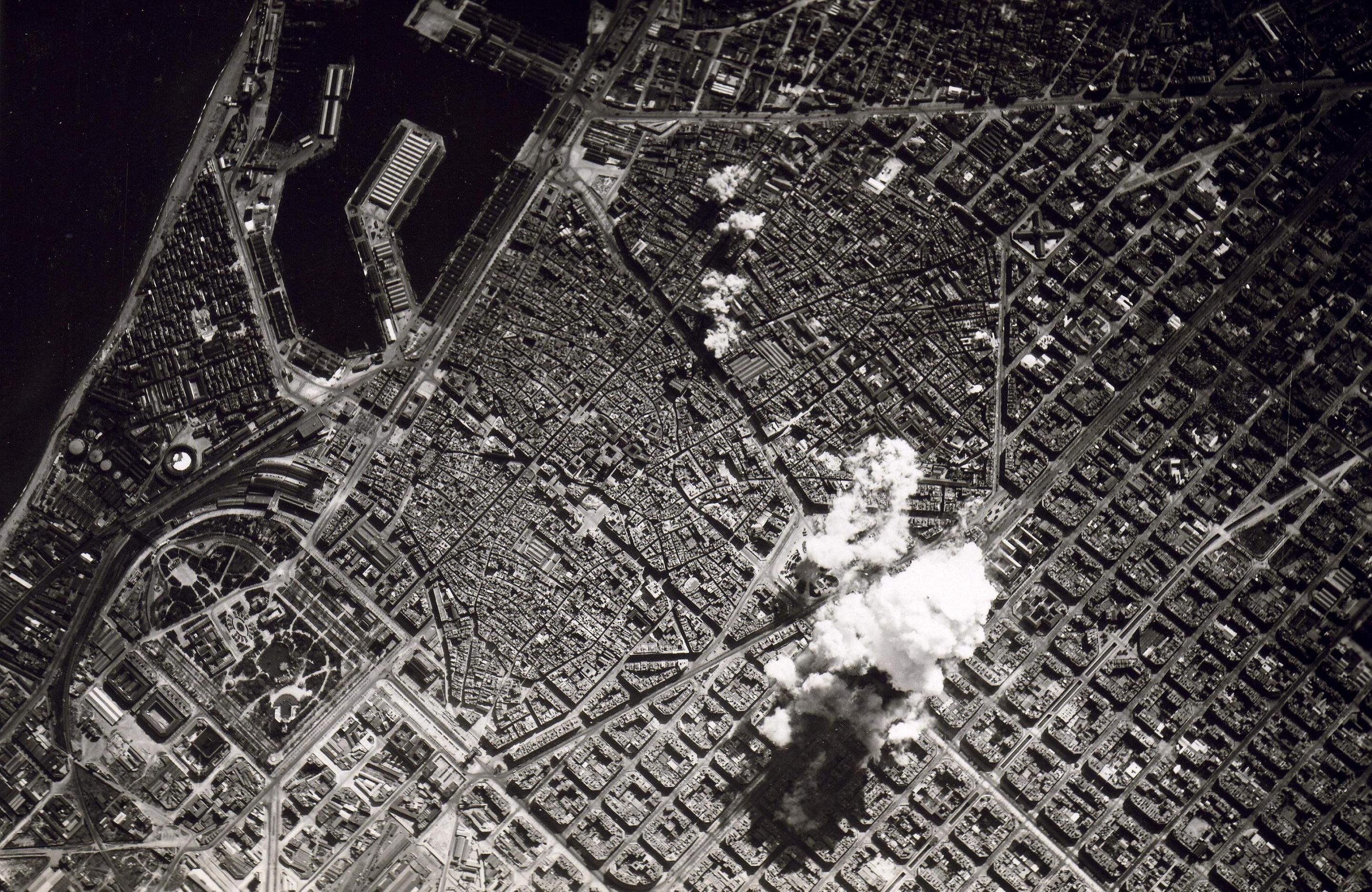
Aerial photograph of the bombing of Barcelona (1938)

From 16 to 18 March 1938, Barcelona was bombed several times by Fascist Italy and Nazi Germany, in support of the Francoist-led army. It left at least 1,300 people killed and 2,000 wounded. The airstrikes intended to destroy industrial areas and demoralize the republicans, however civil buildings were also destroyed.

The fall of the city on 26 January 1939, caused a mass exodus of civilians who fled to the French border. The resistance of Barcelona to Franco's coup d'état was to have lasting effects after the defeat of the Republican government. The autonomous institutions of Catalonia were abolished, and the use of the Catalan language in public life was suppressed. Barcelona remained the second largest city in Spain, at the heart of a region which was relatively industrialized and prosperous, despite the devastation of the civil war. The result was a large-scale immigration from poorer regions of Spain (particularly Andalusia, Murcia and Galicia), which in turn led to rapid urbanization.

During the francoist period, municipal elections were suspended through all Spain and the mayor was appointed by the central government. Pressure for change was particularly strong in Barcelona, which considered that it had been punished during nearly forty years of Francoism for its support of the Republican government. After Franco's death in 1975, massive peaceful demonstrations on 11 September 1977 assembled over a million people in the streets of Barcelona to call for the restoration of Catalan autonomy. It was granted less than a month later. After the adoption of the Constitution, municipal elections were held again (1979).

=== Recent history ===
The development of Barcelona was promoted by two events in 1986: Spanish accession to the European Community, and particularly Barcelona's designation as host city of the 1992 Summer Olympics. The process of urban regeneration has been rapid, and accompanied by a greatly increased international reputation of the city as a tourist destination. The increased cost of housing has led to a slight decline (−16.6%) in the population over the last two decades of the 20th century as many families move out into the suburbs. This decline has been reversed since 2001, as a new wave of immigration (particularly from Latin America and from Morocco) has gathered pace.

In 1987, an ETA car bombing at Hipercor killed 21 people.

In 1992, Barcelona hosted the Summer Olympics. The after-effects of this are credited with driving major changes in what had, up until then, been a largely industrial city. As part of the preparation for the games, industrial buildings along the sea-front were demolished and 3 km (2 mi) of beach were created. New construction increased the road capacity of the city by 17%, the sewage handling capacity by 27% and the amount of new green areas and beaches by 78%. Between 1990 and 2004, the number of hotel rooms in the city doubled. Perhaps more importantly, the outside perception of the city was changed making, by 2012, Barcelona the 12th most popular city destination in the world and the 5th amongst European cities.

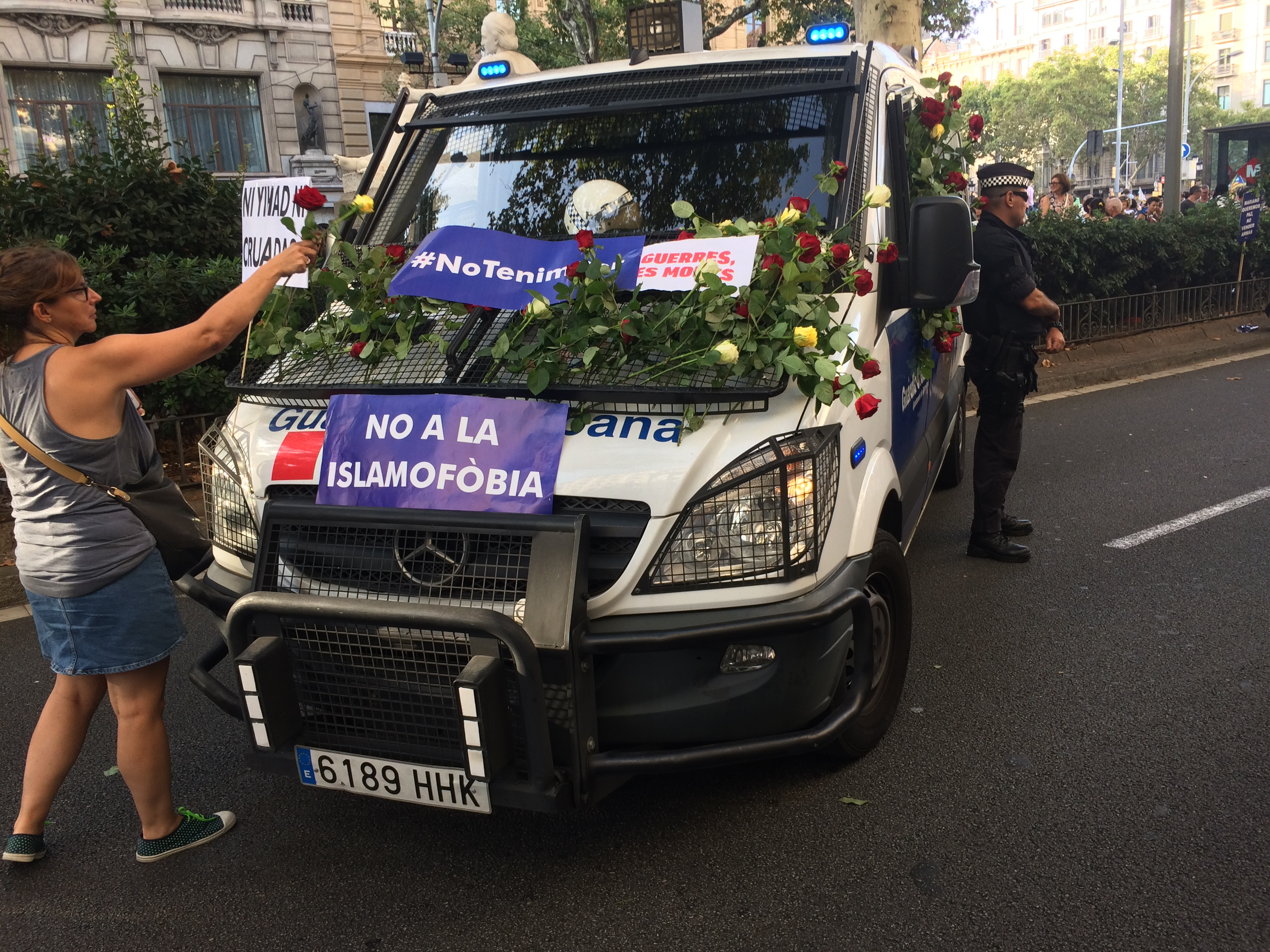
A woman leaves flowers in a Guàrdia Urbana van after the attack

The year 2017 was an intense year in Barcelona. On 17 August, Barcelona suffered a terrorist attack in the iconic Rambla, where a van drove into pedestrians, killing 13 people and injuring at least 130 others. The perpetrator fled on foot, killing another person to steal his car, and a large police operation was started. Massive demonstrations in the city center took place the days after the attack, with the motto "No tinc por" ("I am not afraid").

Other attacks took place elsewhere in Catalonia. The Prime Minister of Spain, Mariano Rajoy, called the attack in Barcelona a jihadist attack. Amaq News Agency attributed indirect responsibility for the attack to the Islamic State of Iraq and the Levant (ISIL).

External videos
- One YouTube video
- Catalonia referendum: Violence as police block voting - BBC News

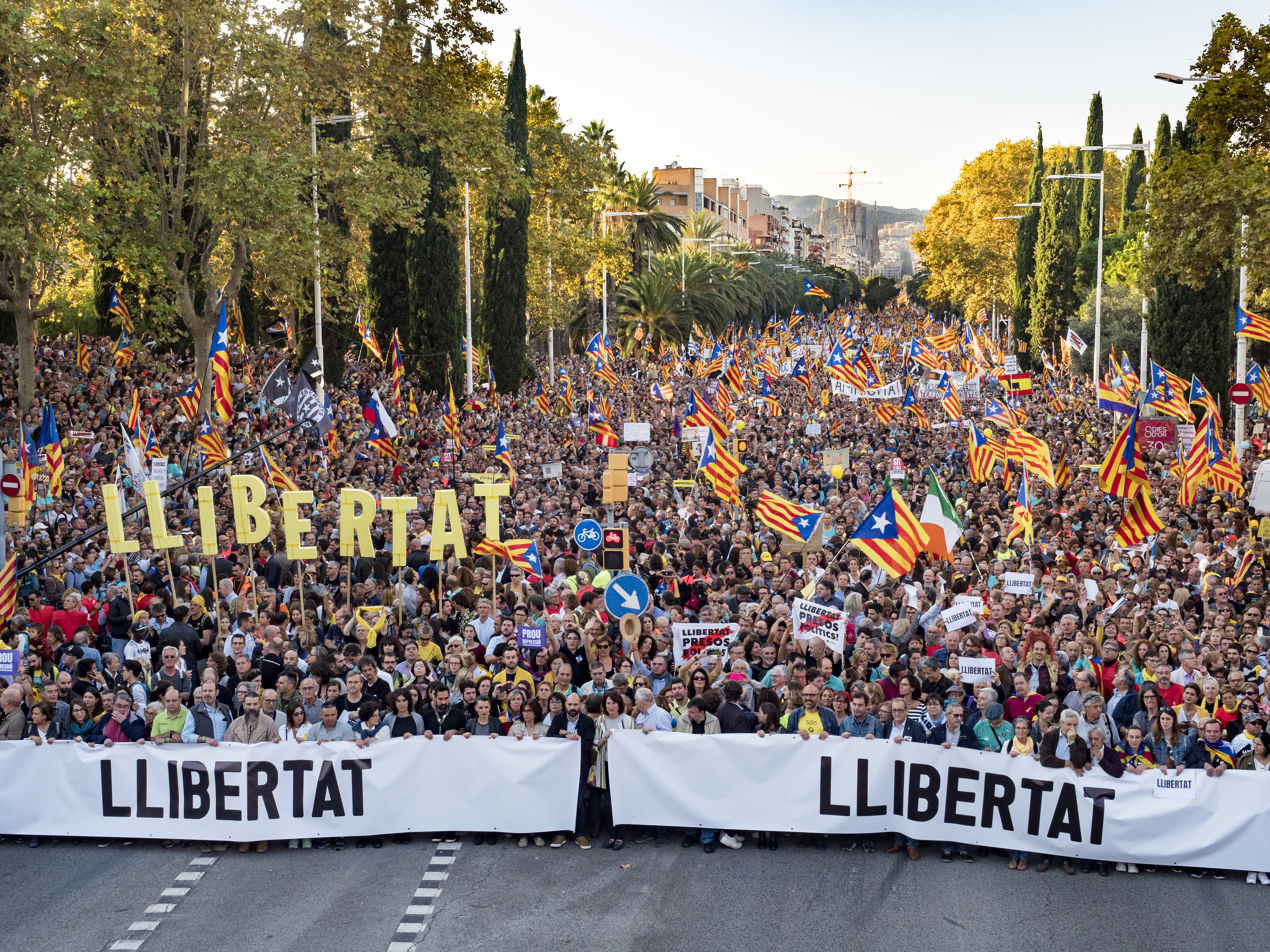
Supporters of Catalan independence in October 2019

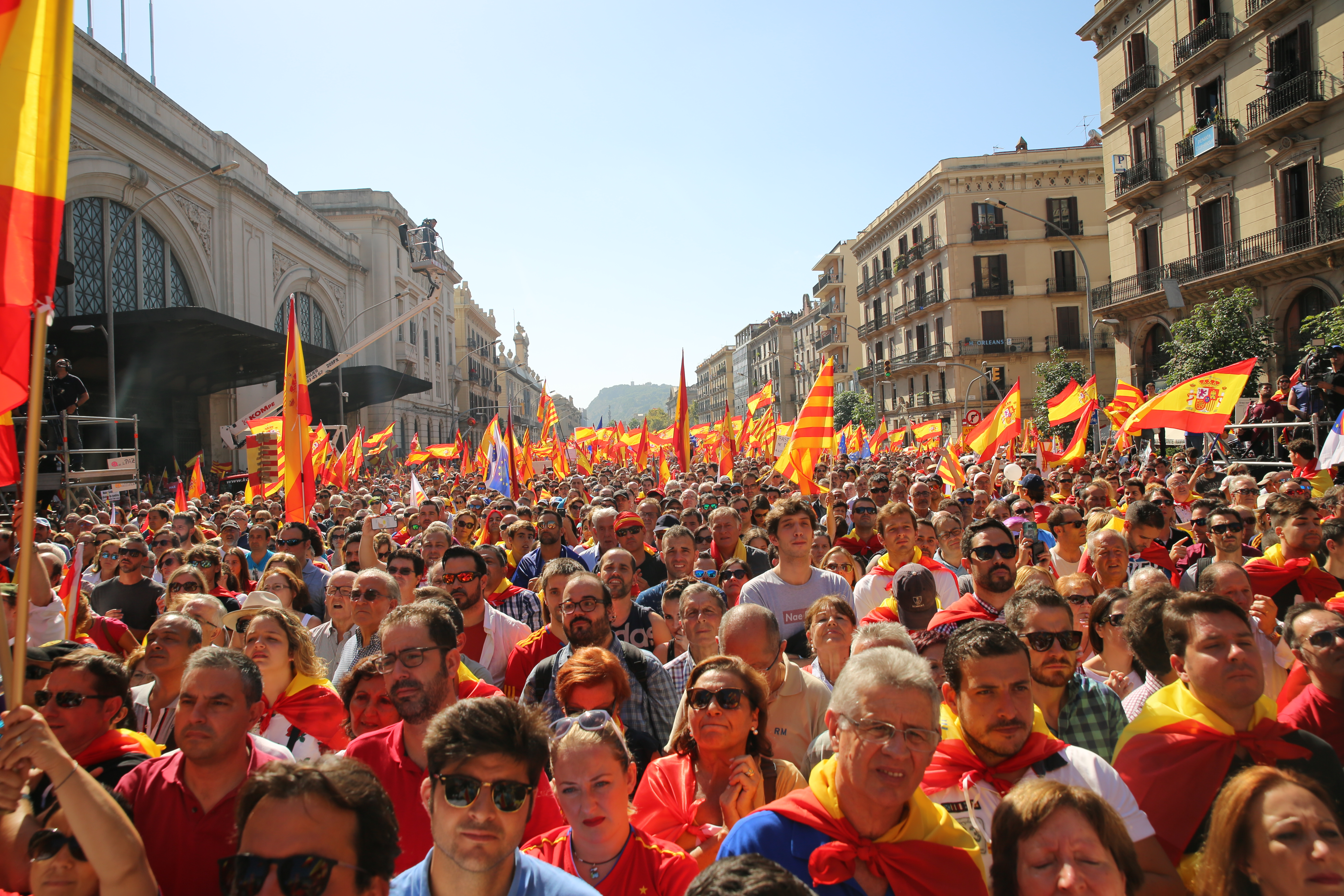
Protest against independence in October 2017

In October 2017, after several years of growing of the Catalan independence movement, with massive demonstrations along the decade, an independence referendum took place. It was declared unconstitutional by the Spanish Constitutional Court, however the Catalan Government ignored it and celebrated it. This led to another court ordering the Spanish Civil Guard and National Police to dismantle voting centers, however their intervention was not pacific. Barcelona was the scenario of several police oppression and chaos, with sources that reported at least 1,066 injured requiring medical attention. Several NGOs condemned the police's violence and reported an excessive use of force.

The referendum sparked the 2017–2018 Spanish constitutional crisis, and later protests took place.

In July 2023, Barcelona was announced as the UNESCO-UIA World Capital of Architecture for the 2024–2026 term. This means it will be the hub for discussion around global challenges including culture, heritage, urban planning and architecture. In addition to being the capital through 2026, it will also host the UIA World Congress of Architects for that year. The honour is befitting of Barcelona, as its history is peppered with architectural achievement and various iconic styles and influences. From its ancient Roman roots, to the Gothic and Modernisme movements, Barcelona has thrived through the way it ties together architecture and culture.

== Geography ==
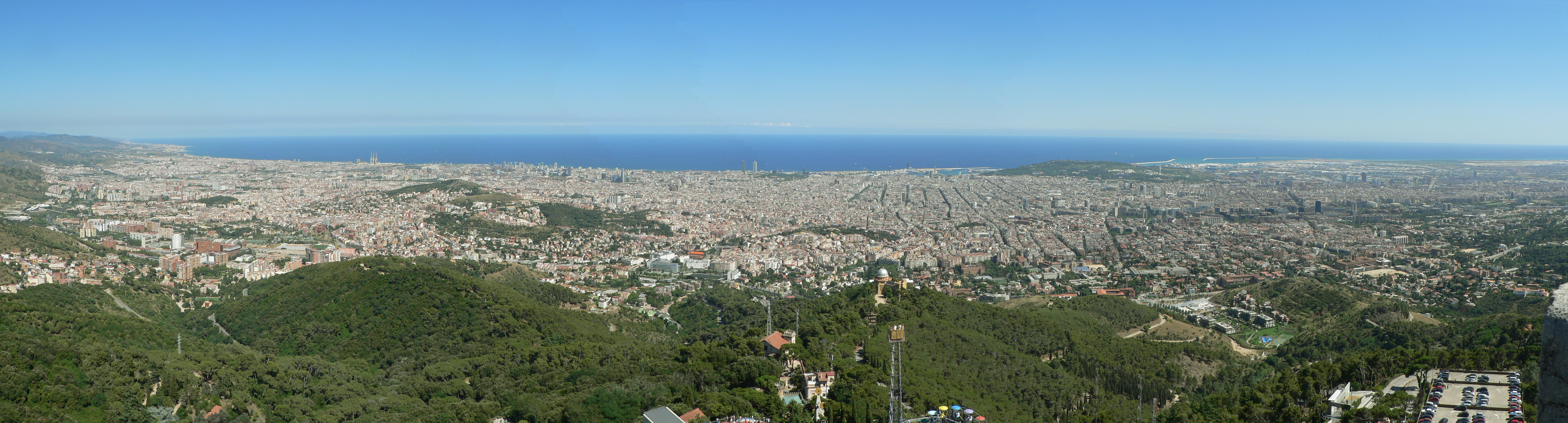
A panoramic view of Barcelona

=== Location ===
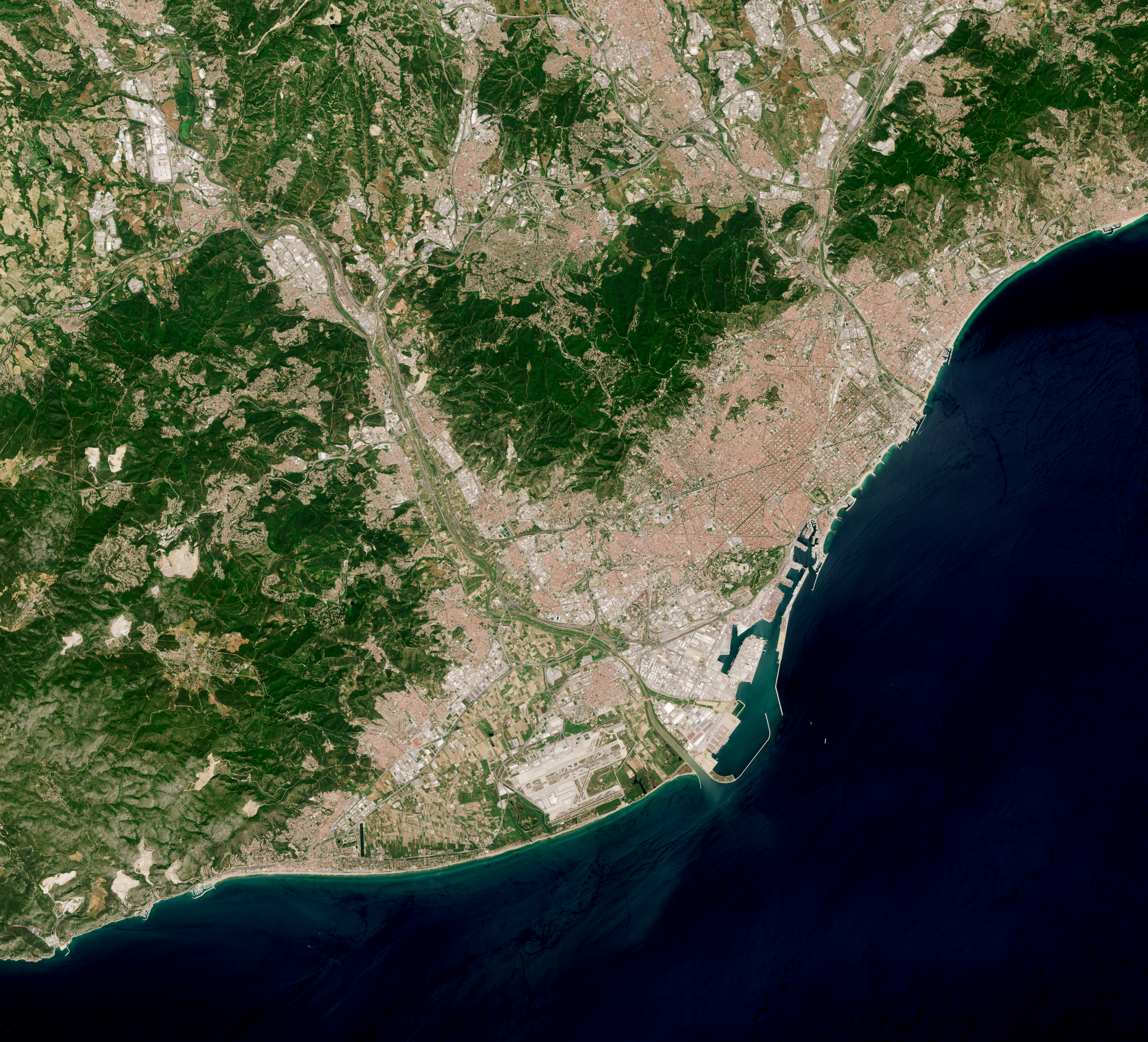
Barcelona as seen by the European Space Agency's Copernicus Sentinel-2 mission

Map of Barcelona metropolitan area

Barcelona is located on the northeast coast of the Iberian Peninsula, facing the Mediterranean Sea, on a plain approximately 5 km (3 mi) wide limited by the mountain range of Collserola, the Llobregat river to the southwest and the Besòs river to the north. This plain covers an area of 170 km^{2} (66 sq mi), of which 101 km^{2} (39.0 sq mi) are occupied by the city itself. It is 120 km (75 mi) south of the Pyrenees and the Catalan border with France.

Tibidabo, 512 m (1,680 ft) high, offers striking views over the city and is topped by the 288.4 m (946.2 ft) Torre de Collserola, a telecommunications tower that is visible from most of the city. Barcelona is peppered with small hills, most of them urbanized, that gave their name to the neighbourhoods built upon them, such as Carmel (267 m or 876 ft), Putxet (es) (181 m or 594 ft) and Rovira (261 m or 856 ft). The escarpment of Montjuïc (173 m or 568 ft), situated to the southeast, overlooks the harbour and is topped by Montjuïc Castle, a fortress built in the 17–18th centuries to control the city as a replacement for the Ciutadella. Today, the fortress is a museum and Montjuïc is home to several sporting and cultural venues, as well as Barcelona's biggest park and gardens.

The city borders on the municipalities of Santa Coloma de Gramenet and Sant Adrià de Besòs to the north; the Mediterranean Sea to the east; El Prat de Llobregat and L'Hospitalet de Llobregat to the south; and Sant Feliu de Llobregat, Sant Just Desvern, Esplugues de Llobregat, Sant Cugat del Vallès, and Montcada i Reixac to the west. The municipality includes two small sparsely-inhabited exclaves to the north-west.

=== Climate ===
According to the Köppen climate classification, Barcelona has a hot summer Mediterranean climate (Csa), with mild winters and warm to hot summers, while the rainiest seasons are autumn and spring. The rainfall pattern is characterized by a short (3 months) dry season in summer, as well as less winter rainfall than in a typical Mediterranean climate. However, both June and August are wetter than February, which is unusual for the Mediterranean climate. This subtype, labelled as "Portuguese" by the French geographer George Viers after the climate classification of Emmanuel de Martonne and found in the NW Mediterranean area (e.g. Marseille), can be seen as transitional to the humid subtropical climate (Cfa) found in inland areas.

Barcelona is densely populated, thus heavily influenced by the urban heat island effect. Areas outside of the urbanized districts can have as much as 2 °C of difference in temperatures throughout the year. Its average annual temperature is 21.2 °C (70.2 °F) during the day and 15.1 °C (59.2 °F) at night. The average annual temperature of the sea is about 20 °C (68 °F). In the coldest month, January, the temperature typically ranges from 12 to 18 °C (54 to 64 °F) during the day, 6 to 12 °C (43 to 54 °F) at night and the average sea temperature is 13 °C (55 °F). In the warmest month, August, the typical temperature ranges from 27 to 31 °C (81 to 88 °F) during the day, about 23 °C (73 °F) at night and the average sea temperature is 26 °C (79 °F). Generally, the summer or "holiday" season lasts about six months, from May to October. Two months – April and November – are transitional; sometimes the temperature exceeds 20 °C (68 °F), with an average temperature of 18–19 °C (64–66 °F) during the day and 11–13 °C (52–55 °F) at night. December, January and February are the coldest months, with average temperatures around 15 °C (59 °F) during the day and 9 °C (48 °F) at night. Large fluctuations in temperature are rare, particularly in the summer months. Because of the proximity to the warm sea plus the urban heat island, frosts are very rare in the city of Barcelona. Snow is also very infrequent in the city of Barcelona, but light snowfalls can occur yearly in the nearby Collserola mountains, such as in the Fabra Observatory located in a nearby mountain.

Barcelona averages 78 rainy days per year (≥ 1 mm), and annual average relative humidity is 72%, ranging from 69% in July to 75% in October. Rainfall totals are highest in late summer and autumn (September–November) and lowest in early and mid-summer (June–August), with a secondary winter minimum (February–March). Sunshine duration is 2,524 hours per year, from 138 (average 4.5 hours of sunshine a day) in December to 310 (average 10 hours of sunshine a day) in July.

Climate data for Barcelona Airport (1991–2020 normals) at 15 km (9.3 mi) from the city centre (extremes 1913–present)
Month	Jan	Feb	Mar	Apr	May	Jun	Jul	Aug	Sep	Oct	Nov	Dec	Year
Record high °C (°F)	23.8 (74.8)	24.5 (76.1)	27.5 (81.5)	29.1 (84.4)	32.0 (89.6)	35.0 (95.0)	37.7 (99.9)	37.4 (99.3)	35.3 (95.5)	30.4 (86.7)	27.0 (80.6)	27.0 (80.6)	37.7 (99.9)
Mean maximum °C (°F)	17.5 (63.5)	18.2 (64.8)	21.0 (69.8)	23.1 (73.6)	26.2 (79.2)	30.1 (86.2)	32.5 (90.5)	32.7 (90.9)	30.1 (86.2)	26.4 (79.5)	21.3 (70.3)	18.1 (64.6)	33.6 (92.5)
Mean daily maximum °C (°F)	14.0 (57.2)	14.5 (58.1)	16.4 (61.5)	18.5 (65.3)	21.7 (71.1)	25.5 (77.9)	28.3 (82.9)	28.9 (84.0)	26.0 (78.8)	22.3 (72.1)	17.6 (63.7)	14.5 (58.1)	20.7 (69.2)
Daily mean °C (°F)	9.7 (49.5)	10.2 (50.4)	12.3 (54.1)	14.5 (58.1)	17.8 (64.0)	21.7 (71.1)	24.5 (76.1)	25.1 (77.2)	22.1 (71.8)	18.3 (64.9)	13.3 (55.9)	10.4 (50.7)	16.7 (62.0)
Mean daily minimum °C (°F)	5.5 (41.9)	5.9 (42.6)	8.1 (46.6)	10.4 (50.7)	13.8 (56.8)	17.9 (64.2)	20.8 (69.4)	21.3 (70.3)	18.0 (64.4)	14.3 (57.7)	9.1 (48.4)	6.2 (43.2)	12.6 (54.7)
Mean minimum °C (°F)	1.1 (34.0)	1.9 (35.4)	3.8 (38.8)	6.6 (43.9)	10.3 (50.5)	14.5 (58.1)	18.0 (64.4)	18.3 (64.9)	14.3 (57.7)	10.1 (50.2)	5.0 (41.0)	2.2 (36.0)	−0.4 (31.3)
Record low °C (°F)	−7.2 (19.0)	−6.6 (20.1)	−1.4 (29.5)	0.1 (32.2)	3.0 (37.4)	7.8 (46.0)	11.4 (52.5)	9.5 (49.1)	7.6 (45.7)	3.8 (38.8)	−1.4 (29.5)	−8.0 (17.6)	−8.0 (17.6)
Average precipitation mm (inches)	41.3 (1.63)	30.1 (1.19)	41.7 (1.64)	47.3 (1.86)	41.9 (1.65)	26.3 (1.04)	27.3 (1.07)	51.2 (2.02)	86.1 (3.39)	82.1 (3.23)	45.5 (1.79)	37.3 (1.47)	558.1 (21.98)
Average precipitation days (≥ 1 mm)	4.2	3.4	4.4	5.6	4.6	3.1	2.1	4.2	6.0	6.4	4.6	3.9	52.5
Average snowy days	0.0	0.2	0.1	0.0	0.0	0.0	0.0	0.0	0.0	0.0	0.1	0.0	0.4
Average relative humidity (%)	68	67	68	68	67	65	65	66	68	72	69	69	68
Mean monthly sunshine hours	136	164	214	228	257	267	298	273	222	177	135	118	2,489
Percentage possible sunshine	46	54	57	57	57	59	65	64	60	51	46	41	55
Source: Agencia Estatal de Meteorología

Climate data for Barcelona centre (1994–2020 averages, extremes 1994–present)
Month	Jan	Feb	Mar	Apr	May	Jun	Jul	Aug	Sep	Oct	Nov	Dec	Year
Record high °C (°F)	22.5 (72.5)	23.2 (73.8)	25.8 (78.4)	26.7 (80.1)	30.3 (86.5)	35.2 (95.4)	35.9 (96.6)	36.2 (97.2)	30.7 (87.3)	29.0 (84.2)	25.9 (78.6)	21.7 (71.1)	36.2 (97.2)
Mean daily maximum °C (°F)	14.5 (58.1)	14.4 (57.9)	16.0 (60.8)	17.7 (63.9)	20.6 (69.1)	24.3 (75.7)	27.0 (80.6)	27.6 (81.7)	25.1 (77.2)	21.9 (71.4)	17.5 (63.5)	14.9 (58.8)	20.1 (68.2)
Daily mean °C (°F)	11.3 (52.3)	11.3 (52.3)	13.1 (55.6)	15.1 (59.2)	18.0 (64.4)	21.9 (71.4)	24.7 (76.5)	25.2 (77.4)	22.4 (72.3)	19.1 (66.4)	14.4 (57.9)	11.9 (53.4)	17.4 (63.3)
Mean daily minimum °C (°F)	8.1 (46.6)	8.2 (46.8)	10.1 (50.2)	12.4 (54.3)	15.4 (59.7)	19.4 (66.9)	22.4 (72.3)	22.8 (73.0)	19.7 (67.5)	16.2 (61.2)	11.3 (52.3)	8.8 (47.8)	14.6 (58.2)
Record low °C (°F)	−1.3 (29.7)	−0.2 (31.6)	0.9 (33.6)	4.3 (39.7)	8.1 (46.6)	12.6 (54.7)	15.3 (59.5)	16.0 (60.8)	12.7 (54.9)	6.9 (44.4)	1.4 (34.5)	1.1 (34.0)	−1.3 (29.7)
Average precipitation mm (inches)	33.1 (1.30)	29.6 (1.17)	38.0 (1.50)	46.5 (1.83)	31.3 (1.23)	17.9 (0.70)	25.2 (0.99)	27.8 (1.09)	65.0 (2.56)	75.2 (2.96)	37.6 (1.48)	32.8 (1.29)	460 (18.1)
Average precipitation days (≥ 1 mm)	3.7	3.7	4.0	5.3	4.3	2.7	1.9	3.2	5.3	5.6	4.2	3.7	47.6
Average relative humidity (%)	77.0	75.7	75.3	76.5	76.8	75.1	74.3	75.2	77.5	80.0	77.7	77.9	76.6
Average dew point °C (°F)	4.5 (40.1)	5.0 (41.0)	6.8 (44.2)	9.2 (48.6)	12.6 (54.7)	16.4 (61.5)	18.8 (65.8)	19.1 (66.4)	16.8 (62.2)	14.0 (57.2)	8.8 (47.8)	5.6 (42.1)	11.5 (52.6)
Mean monthly sunshine hours	150.0	172.5	237.1	258.9	305.8	323.7	334.8	299.0	233.7	189.7	148.6	137.4	2,791.2
Source 1: Agencia Estatal de Meteorología
Source 2: Weather.Directory

Climate data for Barcelona Can Bruixa – Barcelona (1987–2010)
Month	Jan	Feb	Mar	Apr	May	Jun	Jul	Aug	Sep	Oct	Nov	Dec	Year
Mean daily maximum °C (°F)	14.8 (58.6)	15.6 (60.1)	17.4 (63.3)	19.1 (66.4)	22.5 (72.5)	26.1 (79.0)	28.6 (83.5)	29.0 (84.2)	26.0 (78.8)	22.5 (72.5)	17.9 (64.2)	15.1 (59.2)	21.2 (70.2)
Daily mean °C (°F)	11.8 (53.2)	12.4 (54.3)	14.2 (57.6)	15.8 (60.4)	19.3 (66.7)	22.9 (73.2)	25.7 (78.3)	26.1 (79.0)	23.0 (73.4)	19.5 (67.1)	14.9 (58.8)	12.3 (54.1)	18.2 (64.8)
Mean daily minimum °C (°F)	8.8 (47.8)	9.3 (48.7)	10.9 (51.6)	12.5 (54.5)	16.1 (61.0)	19.8 (67.6)	22.7 (72.9)	23.1 (73.6)	20.0 (68.0)	16.5 (61.7)	11.9 (53.4)	9.5 (49.1)	15.1 (59.2)
Average precipitation mm (inches)	43.7 (1.72)	31.4 (1.24)	33.0 (1.30)	47.7 (1.88)	47.4 (1.87)	32.5 (1.28)	25.1 (0.99)	40.8 (1.61)	81.9 (3.22)	96.5 (3.80)	45.1 (1.78)	46.8 (1.84)	571.9 (22.53)
Average precipitation days (≥ 0.1 mm)	7.0	5.0	6.2	7.9	7.5	5.5	3.1	5.8	8.0	9.0	6.6	7.0	78.6
Average relative humidity (%) (daily average)	69	69	69	68	68	67	66	70	74	75	71	69	70
Mean monthly sunshine hours	149	163	200	220	244	262	310	282	219	180	146	138	2,524
Source 1: Servei Meteorològic de Catalunya
Source 2: Agencia Estatal de Meteorología (sunshine hours)

== Demographics ==
Province of Barcelona population pyramid in 2022

Historical population
Year	Pop.	±%
1842	121,815	—
1857	183,787	+50.9%
1877	243,315	+32.4%
1887	268,223	+10.2%
1900	528,946	+97.2%
1910	581,823	+10.0%
1920	705,901	+21.3%
1930	958,723	+35.8%
1940	1,077,671	+12.4%
1950	1,276,675	+18.5%
1960	1,526,550	+19.6%
1970	1,741,979	+14.1%
1981	1,752,627	+0.6%
1991	1,643,542	−6.2%
2001	1,503,884	−8.5%
2011	1,611,013	+7.1%
2021	1,627,559	+1.0%
Source: INE

As of 2025, the population is 1,713,247, of which 47.9% are males, and 52.1% are females. Minors make up 13.8% of the population, and seniors make up 21.0%.

The city is the main component of an administrative area of Greater Barcelona, with a population of 3,218,071 in an area of 636 km^{2} (246 sq mi) (density 5,060 inhabitants/km^{2}). The population of the urban area was 4,840,000. It is the central nucleus of the Barcelona metropolitan area, which relies on a population of 5,474,482.

In 1900, Barcelona had a population of 533,000, which grew steadily but slowly until 1950, when it started absorbing a high number of people from other less-industrialized parts of Spain. Barcelona's population peaked in 1979 at 1,906,998, and fell throughout the 1980s and 1990s as more people sought a higher quality of life in outlying cities in the Barcelona Metropolitan Area. After bottoming out in 2000 with 1,496,266 residents, the city's population began to rise again as younger people started to return, causing a great increase in housing prices.

=== Languages spoken ===
Catalan is the "own language" of Catalonia and Barcelona, and therefore its the main language used by the City Council, in schools and it dominates the linguistic landscape. All toponymy of Barcelona, including the stops of the metro system, are exclusively in the Catalan language. Despite this, Spanish is the most spoken language in Barcelona (according to the linguistic census held by the Government of Catalonia in 2013) and it is understood almost universally. Catalan is also very commonly spoken in the city: it is understood by 95% of the population, while 72.3% can speak it, 79% can read it, and 53% can write it. Knowledge of Catalan has increased significantly in recent decades thanks to a language immersion educational system.

After Catalan and Spanish, the most spoken languages in Barcelona are those from North Africa, such as Amazigh and Arabic, followed by Bengali, Urdu, Punjabi, Mandarin Chinese, Romanian, English, Russian and Quechua, according to data collected by the University of Barcelona. Within Barcelona's Chinese community, varieties of Wu Chinese are also widely spoken by migrants of Qingtianese and Wenzhounese origin alongside Mandarin Chinese.

=== Population density ===
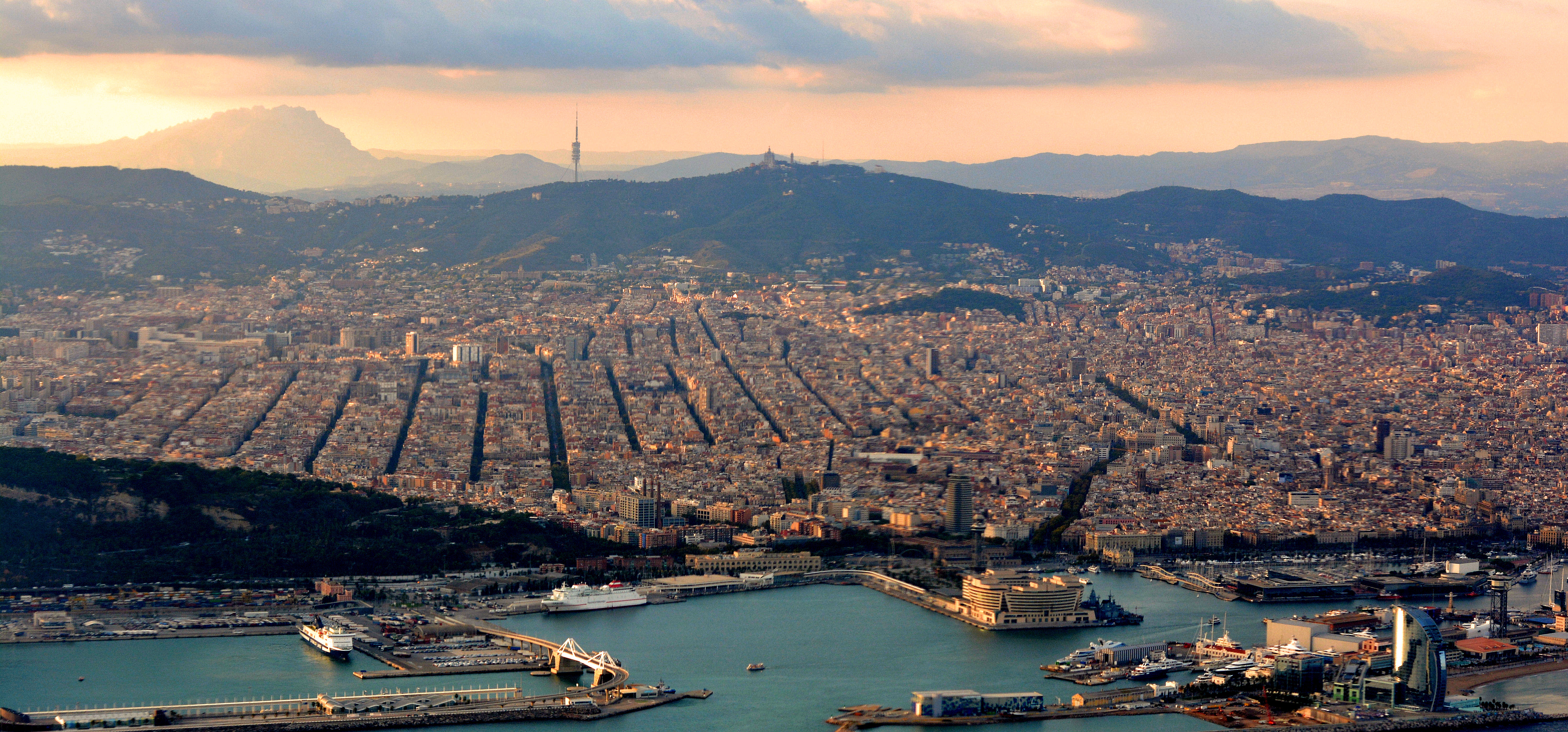
Aerial view of the centre and the Eixample, with the Serra de Collserola at the background

Barcelona is one of the most densely populated cities in Europe. In 2008, the city council calculated the population to 1,621,090 living in the 102.2 km^{2} sized municipality, giving the city an average population density of 15,926 inhabitants per square kilometre with Eixample being the most populated district.

In the case of Barcelona though, the land distribution is extremely uneven. Half of the municipality or 50.2 km^{2}, all of it located on the municipal edge is made up of the ten least densely populated neighbourhoods containing less than 10% of the city's population, the uninhabited Zona Franca industrial area and Montjuïc forest park. Leaving the remaining 90% or slightly below 1.5 million inhabitants living on the remaining 52 km^{2} (20 sq mi) at an average density close to 28,500 inhabitants per square kilometre.

Of the 73 neighbourhoods in the city, 45 had a population density above 20,000 inhabitants per square kilometre with a combined population of 1,313,424 inhabitants living on 38.6 km^{2} at an average density of 33,987 inhabitants per square kilometre. The 30 most densely populated neighbourhoods accounted for 57.5% of the city population occupying only 22.7% of the municipality, or in other words, 936,406 people living at an average density of 40,322 inhabitants per square kilometre. The city's highest density is found at and around the neighbourhood of la Sagrada Família where four of the city's most densely populated neighbourhoods are located side by side, all with a population density above 50,000 inhabitants per square kilometre.

=== Age structure ===
In 1900, almost a third (28.9 percent) of the population were children (aged younger than 14 years). As of 2025, this age group constituted only 12.7% of the population. In 2017, people aged between 15 and 24 years made up 9 percent of the population; those aged between 25 and 44 years made up 30.6 percent of the population; while those aged between 45 and 64 years formed 56.9% of all Barcelonans. In 1900, people aged 65 and older made up just 6.5 percent of the population. As of 2025, this age group makes up 21.0% of the population.

=== Migration ===
Foreign population by country of birth (2025)
Country	Population
Argentina	48,258
Colombia	44,978
Peru	40,833
Venezuela	34,391
Pakistan	29,538
Ecuador	25,605
Morocco	25,401
Italy	23,434
Honduras	21,444
China	20,258
France	17,753
Brazil	16,521
Russia	15,162
Bolivia	14,572
Philippines	14,460

As of 2025, immigrants make up 34.6% of the population. The 5 largest foreign countries of birth are Argentina, Colombia, Peru, Venezuela, and Pakistan. Many migrants also come from Latin American nations such as Bolivia or Ecuador. Since the 1990s, and similar to other migrants, many Latin Americans have settled in northern parts of the city.

As of 2025, 45.3% of the population was born in Barcelona, 7.1% in the rest of Catalonia and 13.0% in the rest of the country. In addition to that, 34.6% of the population was born outside of Spain, a proportion which has more than quadrupled since 2001 and increased more than eightfold since 1996 when it was 8.6% and 3.9% respectively.

There exists a relatively large Pakistani community in Barcelona with up to twenty thousand nationals. The community consists of significantly more men than women. Many of the Pakistanis are living in Ciutat Vella. First Pakistani migrants came in the 1970s, with increasing numbers in the 1990s.

Other significant migrant groups come from Asia as from China and the Philippines. Barcelona's Chinese community has historically included substantial numbers of migrants from Qingtian and neighboring Wenzhou region in southern Zhejiang. Although migration from this region has long predominated, the provenance of Chinese population has become increasingly diverse, with arrivals from other regions across China.

There is a Japanese community clustered in Bonanova, Les Tres Torres, Pedralbes, and other northern neighbourhoods, and a Japanese international school serves that community.

=== Religion ===
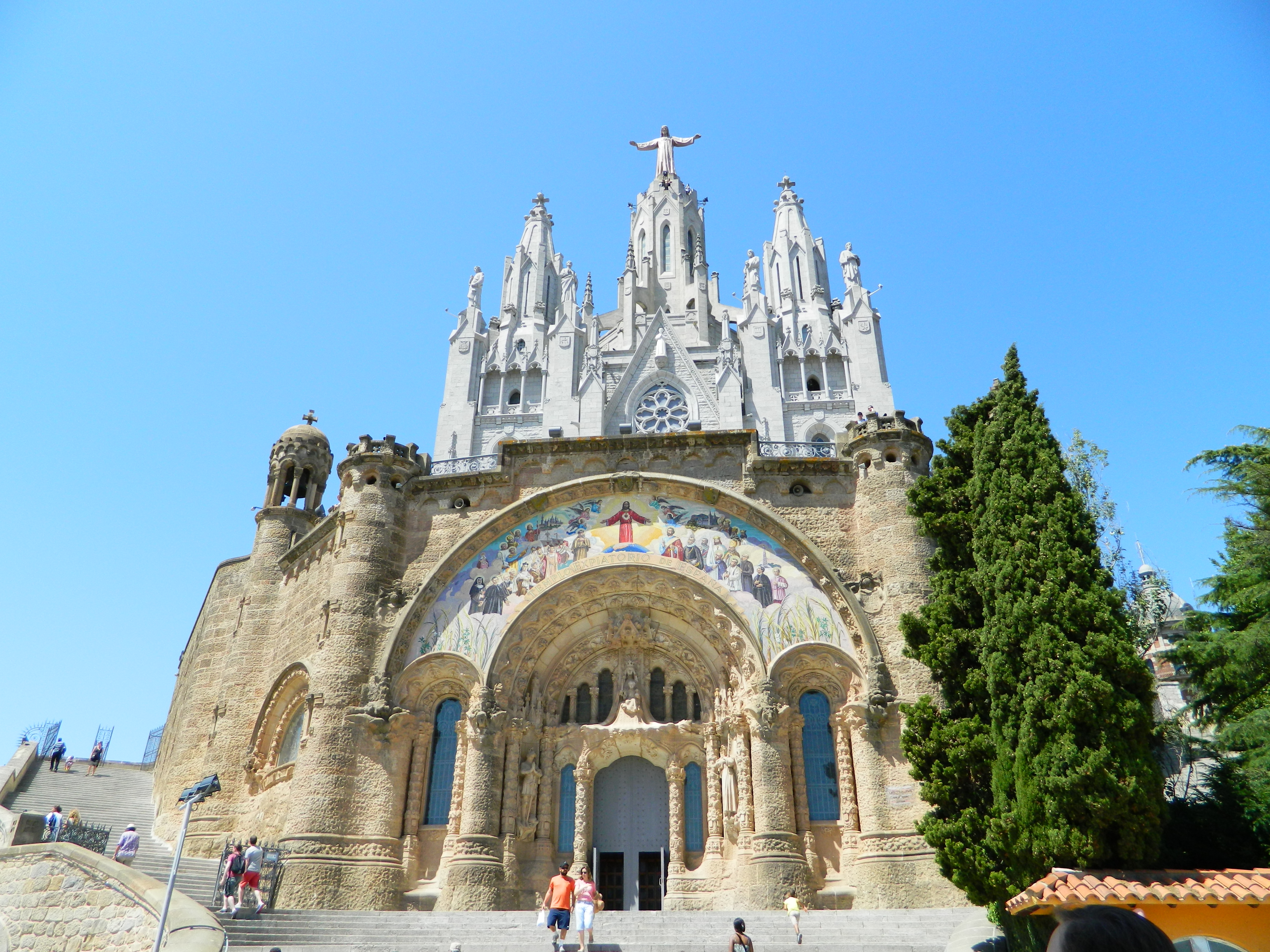
Temple Expiatori del Sagrat Cor

In 2007, most of the inhabitants stated they are Roman Catholic (208 churches). In a 2011 survey conducted by InfoCatólica, 49.5% of Barcelona residents of all ages identified themselves as Catholic. This was the first time that more than half of respondents did not identify themselves as Catholic Christians. The numbers reflect a broader trend in Spain whereby the numbers of self-identified Catholics have declined. In 2019, a survey by Centro de Investigaciones Sociológicas showed that 53.2% of residents in Barcelona identified themselves as Catholic (9.9% practising Catholics, 43.3% non-practising Catholics).

The province has the largest Muslim community in Spain, 322,698 people in Barcelona province are of Muslim religion. A considerable number of Muslims live in Barcelona due to immigration (169 locations, mostly professed by Moroccans in Spain). In 2014, 322,698 out of 5.5 million people in the province of Barcelona identified themselves as Muslim, which makes 5.6% of the total population.

The city also has the largest Jewish community in Spain, with an estimated 3,500 Jews living in the city. There are also a number of other groups, including Evangelical (71 locations, mostly professed by Roma), Jehovah's Witnesses (21 Kingdom Halls), Buddhists (13 locations), and Eastern Orthodox.

== Administration ==
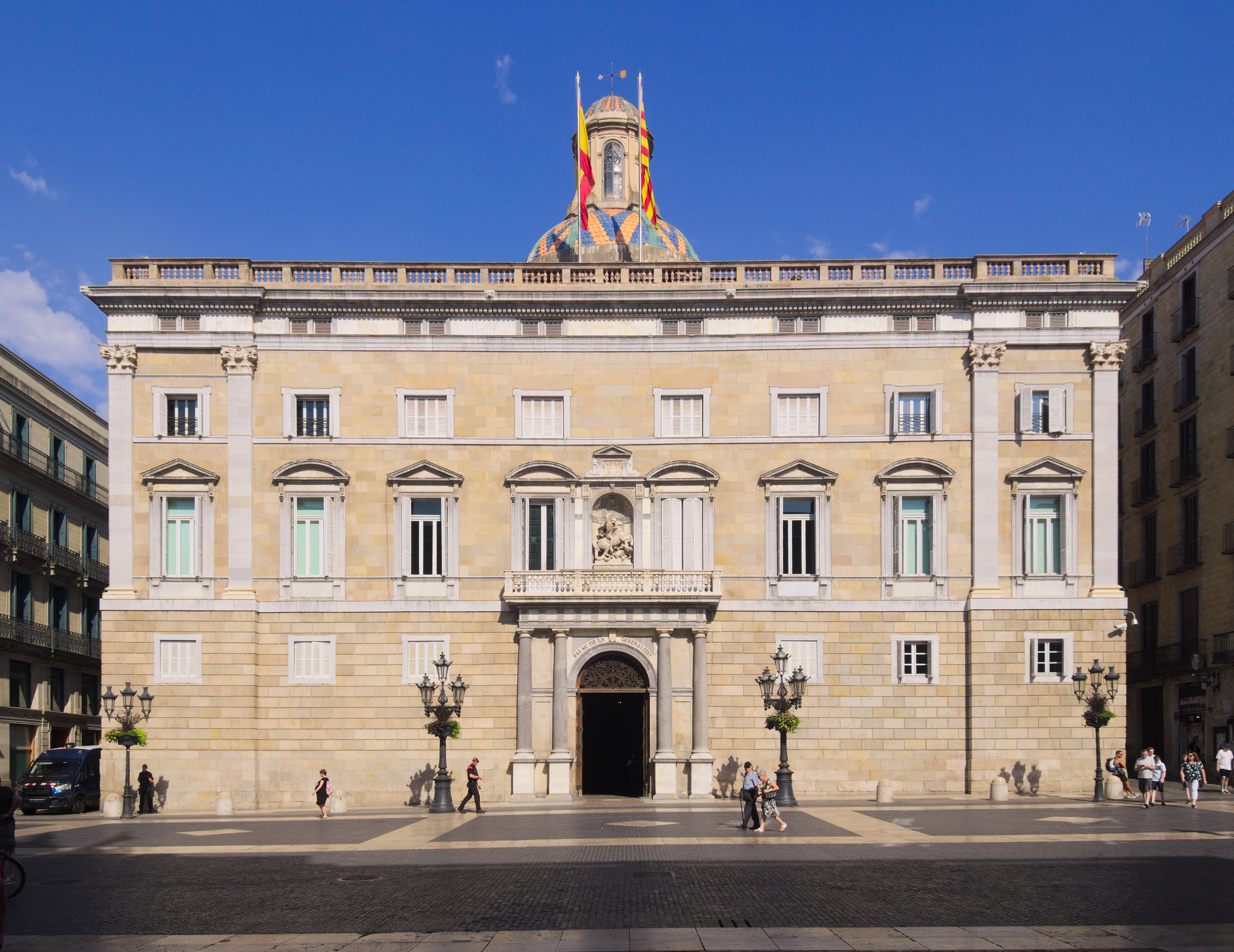
Palau de la Generalitat de Catalunya

As the capital of the autonomous community of Catalonia, Barcelona is the seat of the Catalan government, known as the Generalitat de Catalunya; of particular note are the executive branch, the parliament, and the High Court of Justice of Catalonia. The city is also the capital of the Province of Barcelona and the Barcelonès comarca (district).

Barcelona is governed by a city council formed by 41 city councillors, elected for a four-year term by universal suffrage. As one of the two biggest cities in Spain, Barcelona is subject to a special law articulated through the Carta Municipal (Municipal Law). A first version of this law was passed in 1960 and amended later, but the current version was approved in March 2006. According to this law, Barcelona's city council is organized in two levels: a political one, with elected city councillors, and one executive, which administers the programs and executes the decisions taken on the political level. This law also gives the local government a special relationship with the central government and it also gives the mayor wider prerogatives by the means of municipal executive commissions. It expands the powers of the city council in areas like telecommunications, city traffic, road safety and public safety. It also gives a special economic regime to the city's treasury and it gives the council a veto in matters that will be decided by the central government, but that will need a favourable report from the council.

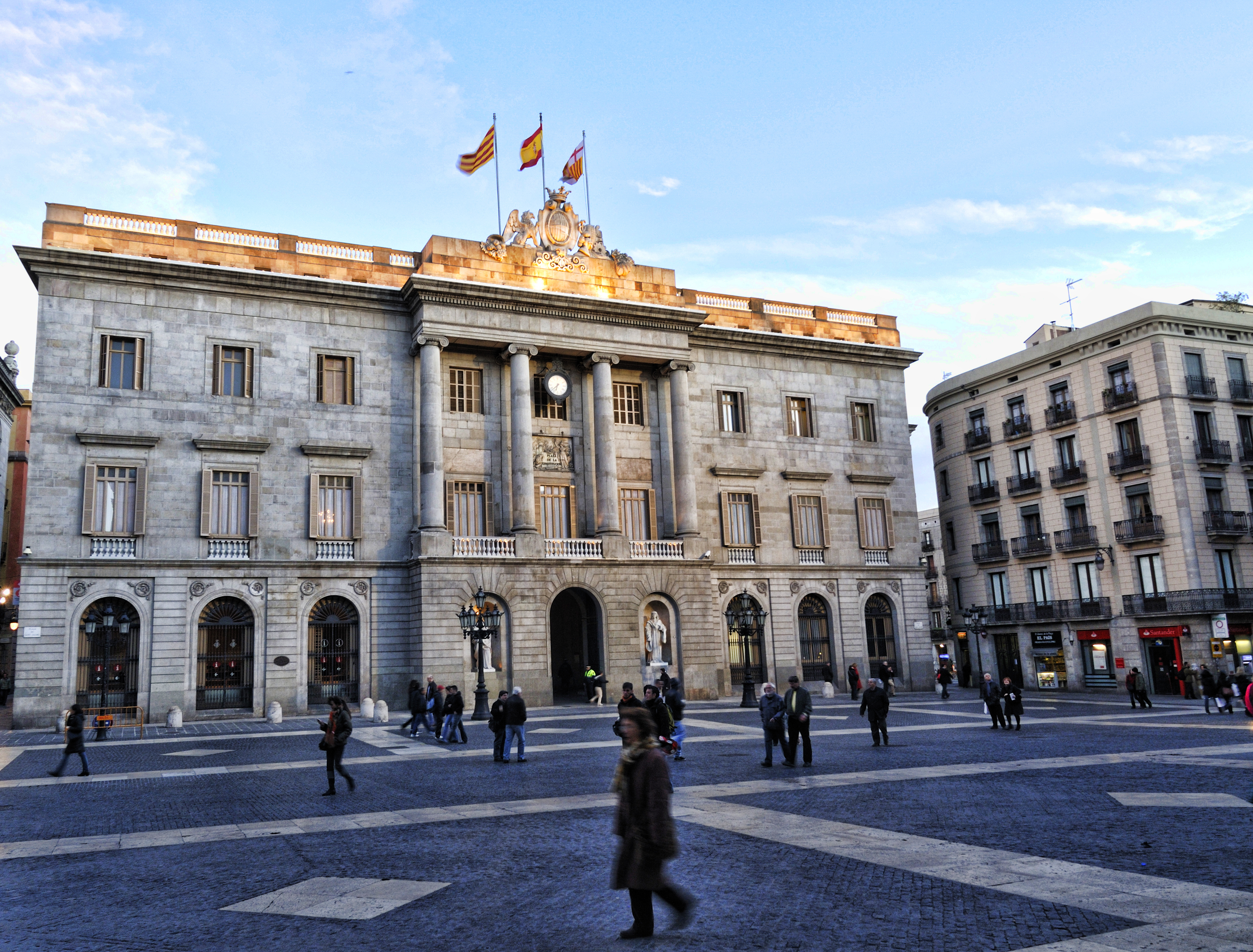
The City Hall of Barcelona

The Comissió de Govern (Government Commission) is the executive branch, formed by 24 councillors, led by the Mayor, with 5 lieutenant-mayors and 17 city councillors, each in charge of an area of government, and 5 non-elected councillors. The plenary, formed by the 41 city councillors, has advisory, planning, regulatory, and fiscal executive functions. The six Commissions del Consell Municipal (City council commissions) have executive and controlling functions in the field of their jurisdiction. They are composed by a number of councillors proportional to the number of councillors each political party has in the plenary. The city council has jurisdiction in the fields of city planning, transportation, municipal taxes, public highways security through the Guàrdia Urbana (the municipal police), city maintenance, gardens, parks and environment, facilities (like schools, nurseries, sports centres, libraries, and so on), culture, sports, youth and social welfare. Some of these competencies are not exclusive, but shared with the Generalitat de Catalunya or the central Spanish government. In some fields with shared responsibility (such as public health, education or social services), there is a shared Agency or Consortium between the city and the Generalitat to plan and manage services.

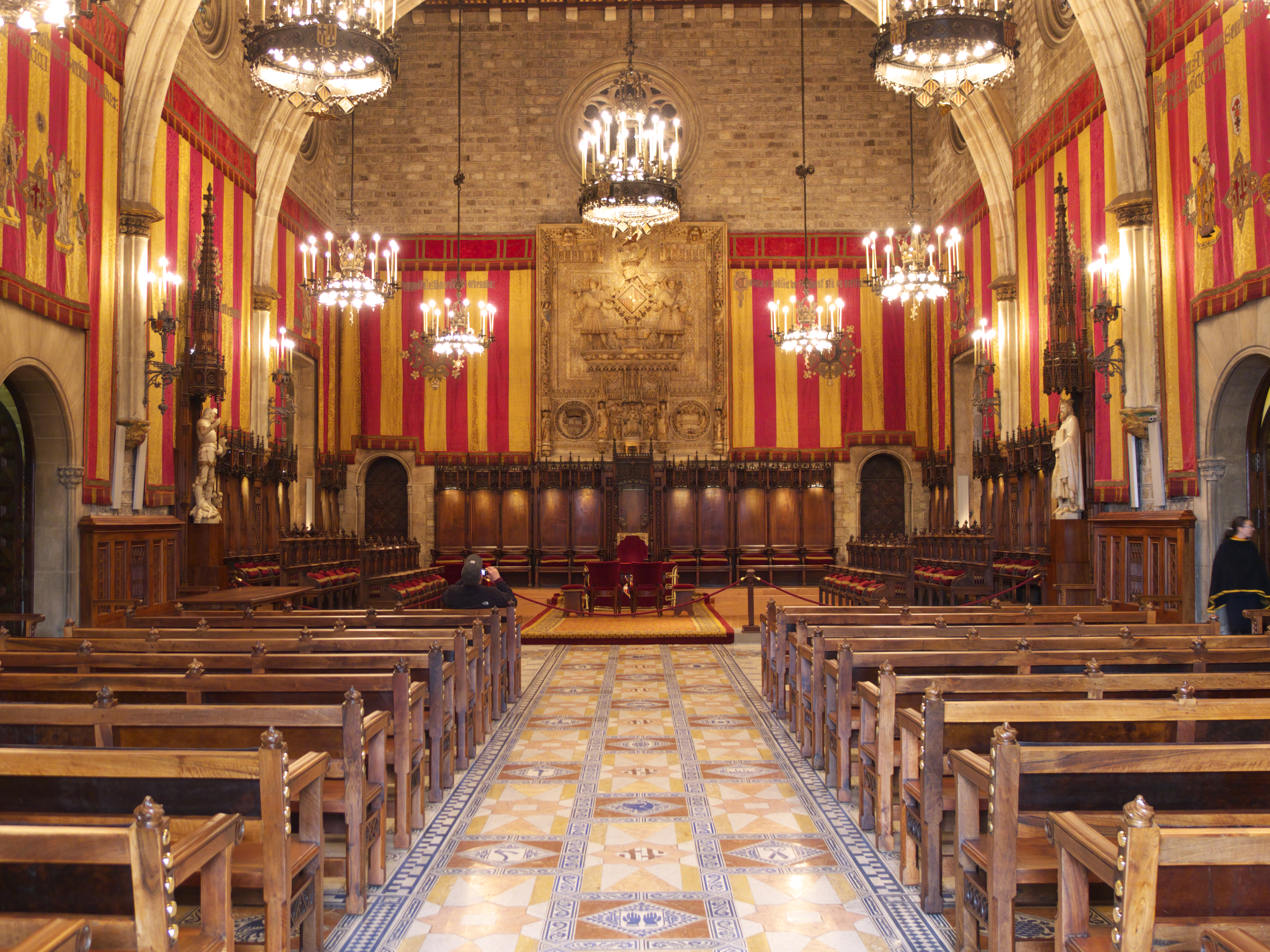
The Saló de Cent, in the City Hall of Barcelona

The executive branch is led by a Chief Municipal Executive Officer which answers to the Mayor. It is made up of departments which are legally part of the city council and by separate legal entities of two types: autonomous public departments and public enterprises.

The seat of the city council is on the Plaça de Sant Jaume, opposite the seat of Generalitat de Catalunya. Since the coming of the Spanish democracy, Barcelona had been governed by the PSC, first with an absolute majority and later in coalition with ERC and ICV. After the May 2007 election, the ERC did not renew the coalition agreement and the PSC governed in a minority coalition with ICV as the junior partner.

After 32 years, on 22 May 2011, CiU gained a plurality of seats at the municipal election, gaining 15 seats to the PSC's 11. The PP hold 8 seats, ICV 5 and ERC 2.

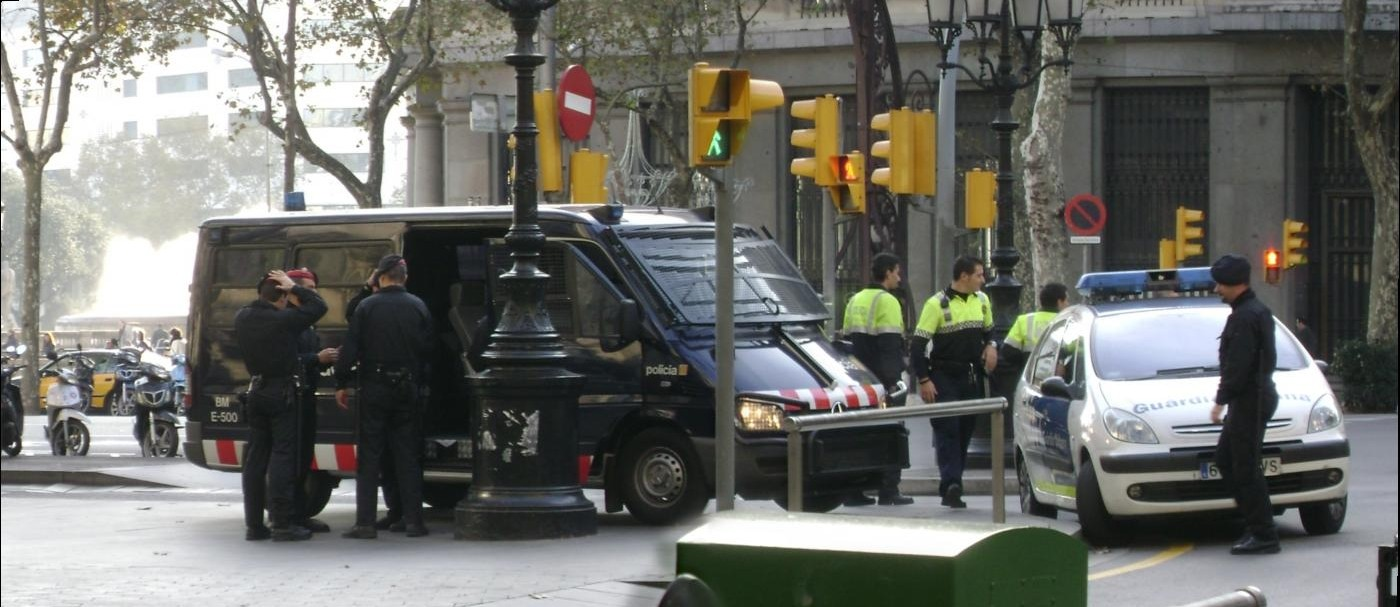
Mossos and Guàrdia Urbana (2010).

=== Public safety ===
Public safety in Barcelona is the duty of the City Council and the Government of Catalonia, who provide it through 2 police forces: the Guàrdia Urbana de Barcelona and the Mossos d'Esquadra, respectively. Before 2008, public safety was also conducted by the National Police Corps, however their duties are now delegated to documental and immigration purposes.

Medical emergencies are attended by the System of Medical Emergencies, while fire and rescue emergencies are attended by the Bombers de Barcelona. Maritime rescue is provided by the Maritime Safety and Rescue Society, the Civil Guard and Mossos (with the support of Guàrdia Urbana during the summer).

The protection of the wildlife of the part of Collserola Park inside municipal limits is the duty of the Rural Agents Corps.

=== Districts ===
Districts of Barcelona

Since 1987, the city has been divided into 10 administrative districts (districtes in Catalan, distritos in Spanish):

- Ciutat Vella
- Eixample
- Sants-Montjuïc
- Les Corts
- Sarrià-Sant Gervasi
- Gràcia
- Horta-Guinardó
- Nou Barris
- Sant Andreu
- Sant Martí

The districts are based mostly on historical divisions, and several are former towns annexed by the city of Barcelona in the 18th and 19th centuries that still maintain their own distinct character. Each district has its own council led by a city councillor. The composition of each district council depends on the number of votes each political party had in that district, so a district can be led by a councillor from a different party than the executive council.

== Culture ==
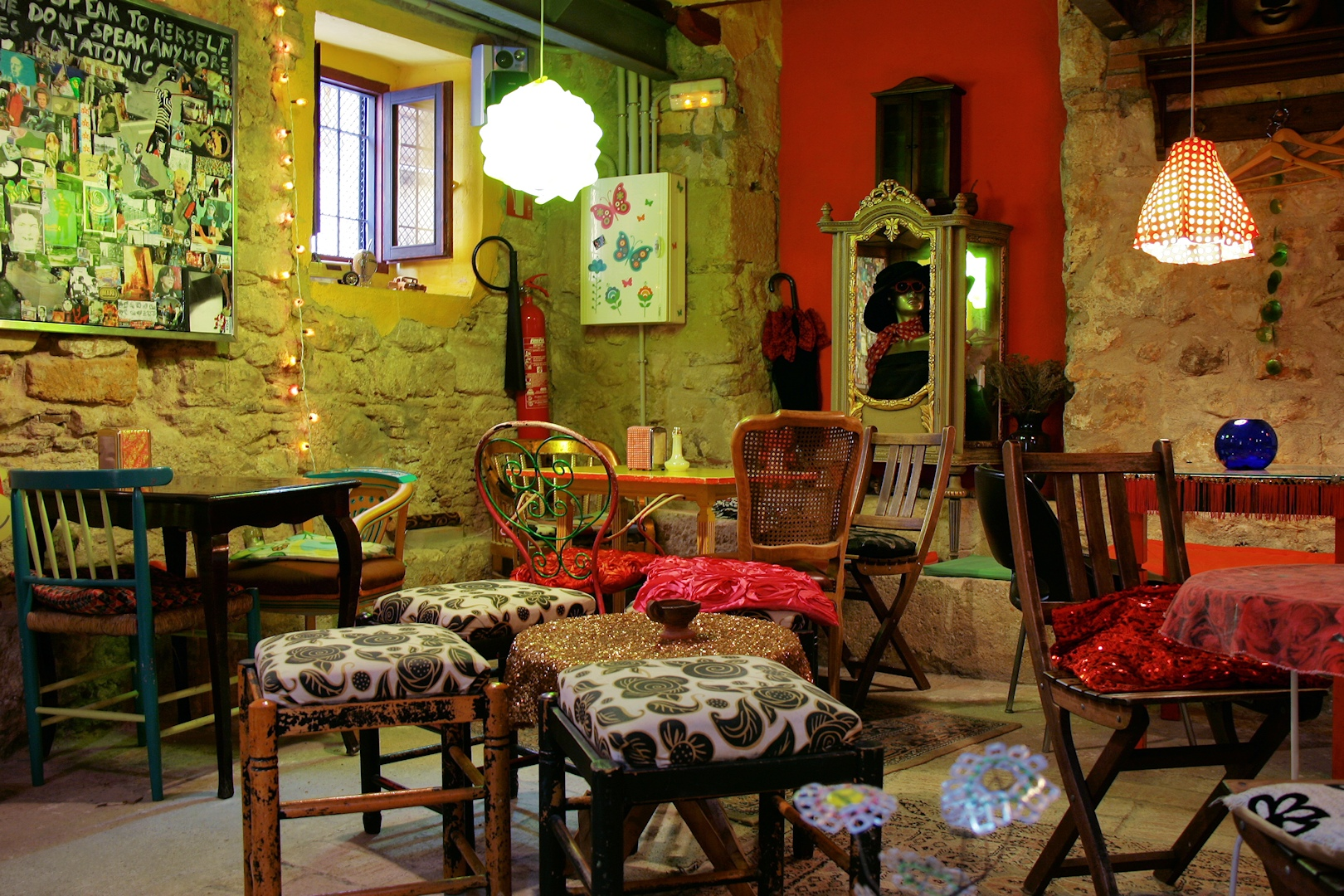
A café in Barcelona

Barcelona's cultural roots go back 2000 years. Since the arrival of democracy, the Catalan language (very much repressed during the dictatorship of Franco) has been promoted, both by recovering works from the past and by stimulating the creation of new works. Barcelona is designated as a world-class city by the Globalization and World Cities Study Group and Network. It has also been part of the UNESCO Creative Cities Network as a City of Literature since 2015.

=== Entertainment and performing arts ===
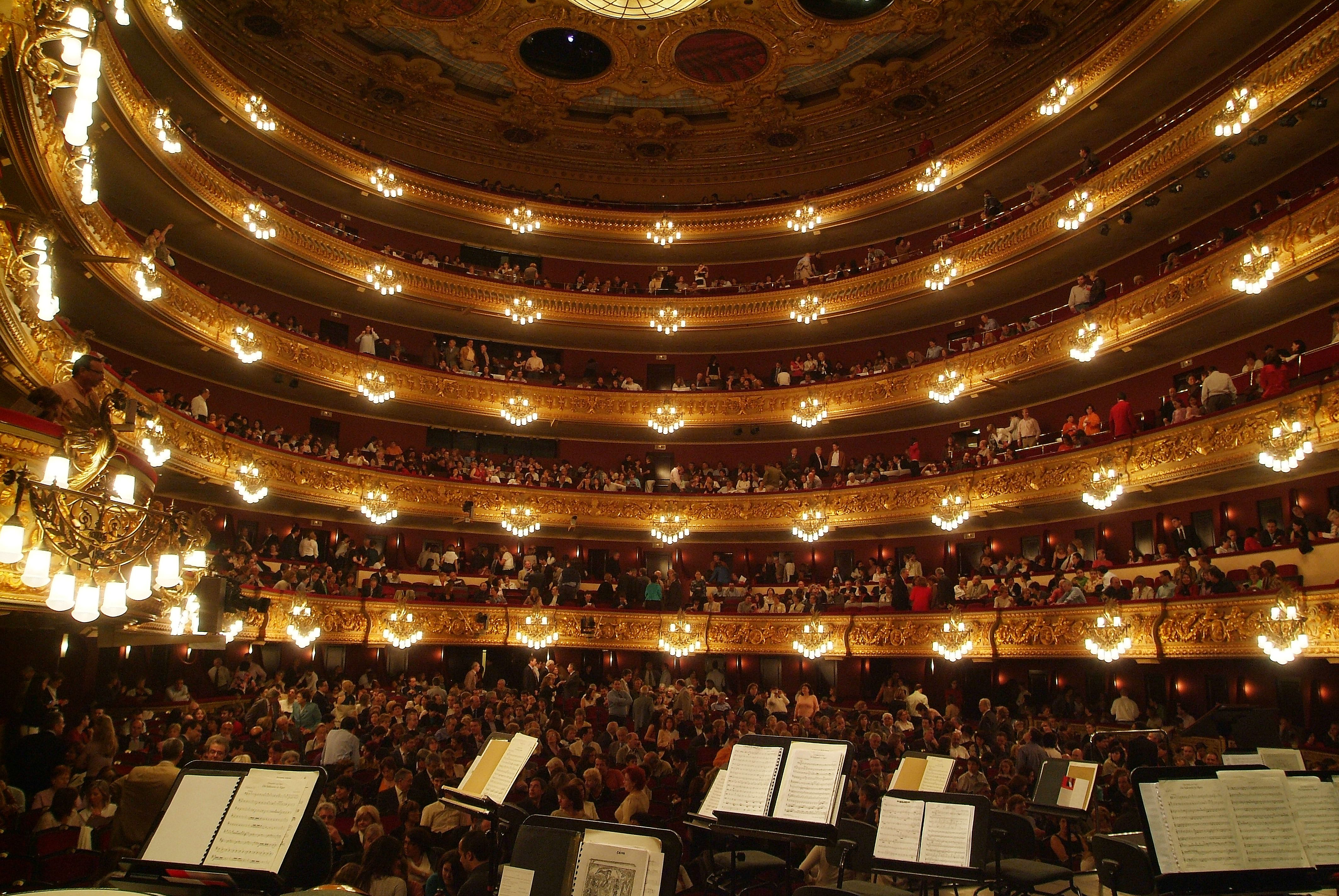
The Liceu opera house

Barcelona has many venues for live music and theatre, including the world-renowned Gran Teatre del Liceu opera house, the Teatre Nacional de Catalunya, the Teatre Lliure and the Palau de la Música Catalana concert hall. Barcelona also is home to the Barcelona Symphony and Catalonia National Orchestra (Orquestra Simfònica de Barcelona i Nacional de Catalunya, usually known as OBC), the largest symphonic orchestra in Catalonia. In 1999, the OBC inaugurated its new venue in the brand-new Auditorium (L'Auditori). It performs around 75 concerts per season and its current director is Eiji Oue. It is home to the Barcelona Guitar Orchestra, directed by Sergi Vicente. The major thoroughfare of La Rambla is home to mime artists and street performers. Yearly, two major pop music festivals take place in the city, the Sónar Festival and the Primavera Sound Festival. The city also has a thriving alternative music scene, with groups such as The Pinker Tones receiving international attention. Barcelona is an international hub of highly active and diverse nightlife with bars, dance bars and nightclubs staying open well past midnight.

=== Media ===
El Periódico de Catalunya, La Vanguardia and Ara are Barcelona's three major daily newspapers (the first two with Catalan and Spanish editions, Ara only in Catalan) while Sport and El Mundo Deportivo (both in Spanish) are the city's two major sports daily newspapers, published by the same companies. The city is also served by a number of smaller publications such as Ara and El Punt Avui (in Catalan), by nationwide newspapers with special Barcelona editions such as El País (in Spanish, with an online version in Catalan) and El Mundo (in Spanish), and by several free newspapers like 20 minutos and Què (all bilingual).

Barcelona's oldest and main online newspaper VilaWeb is also one of the oldest one in Europe (with Catalan and English editions).

Several major FM stations include Catalunya Ràdio, RAC 1, RAC 105 and Cadena SER. Barcelona also has a local TV station, Betevé, owned by city council. The headquarters of Televisió de Catalunya, Catalonia's public network, are located in Sant Joan Despí, in Barcelona's metropolitan area.

=== Sports ===
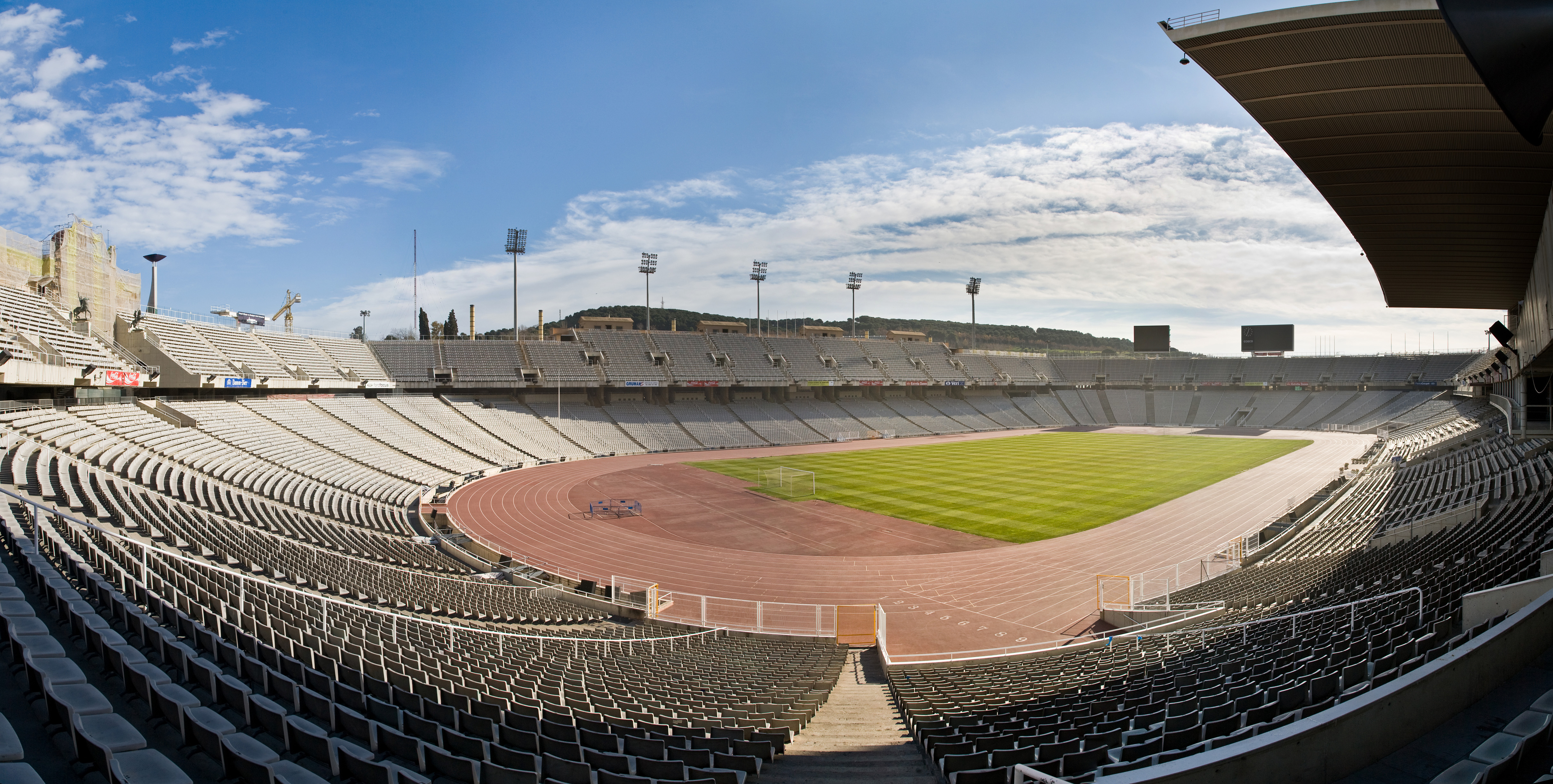
Estadi Olímpic de Montjuïc (Barcelona Olympic Stadium) built for the 1936 Summer Olympics named People's Olympiad, main stadium of 1992 Summer Olympics

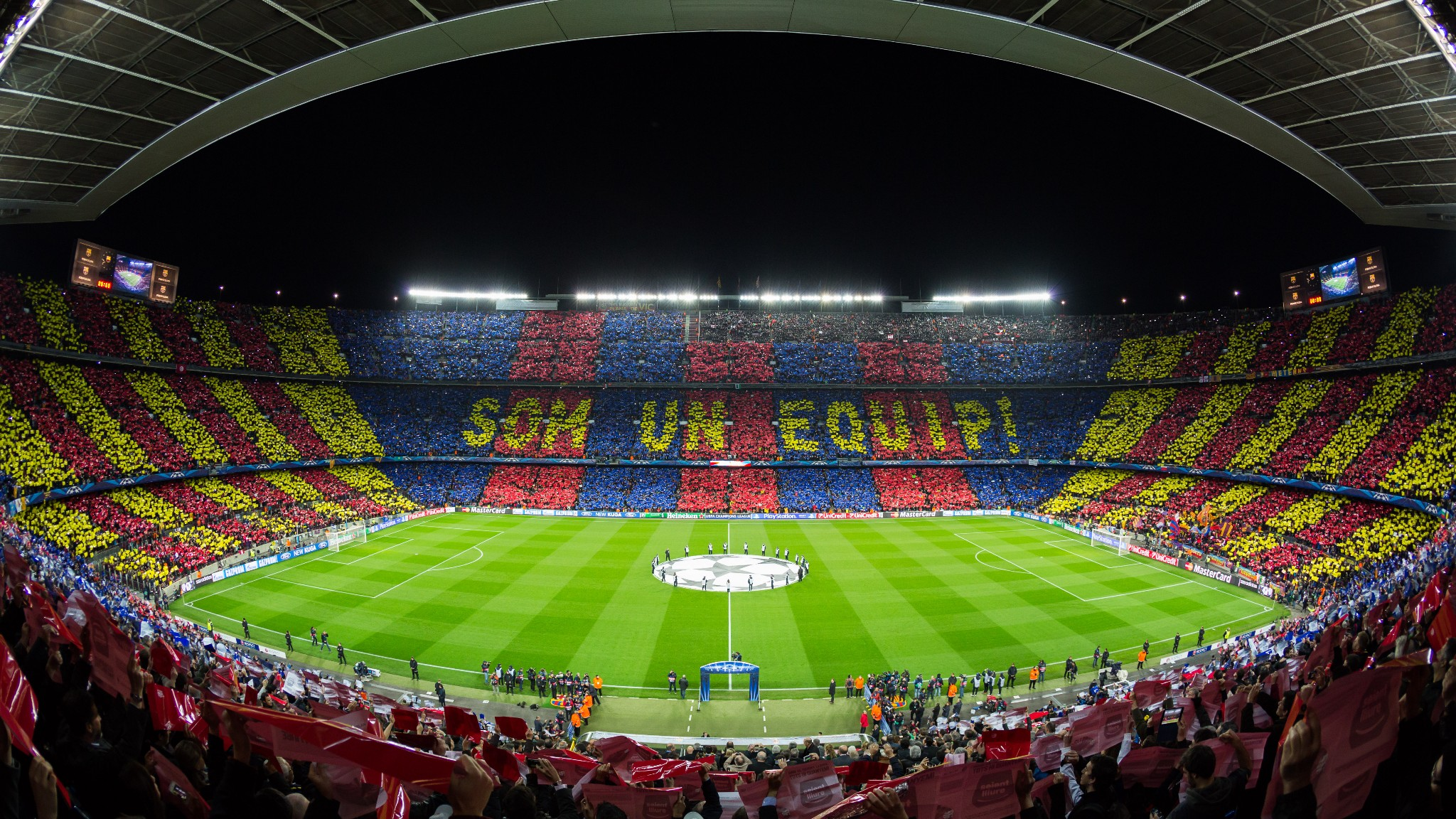
The Camp Nou, the largest stadium in Europe

Barcelona has a long sporting tradition and hosted the highly successful 1992 Summer Olympics as well as several matches during the 1982 FIFA World Cup (at the two stadiums). It has hosted about 30 sports events of international significance. FC Barcelona is a sports club best known worldwide for its football team, one of the largest and the wealthiest in the world. It has 74 national trophies (while finishing 46 times as runners-up) and 17 continental prizes (with being runners-up 11 times), including five UEFA Champions League trophies out of eight finals and three FIFA Club World Cup wins out of four finals. The club won six trophies in a calendar year in 2009, becoming one of only 2 male football teams in the world to win the coveted sextuple, apart from FC Bayern Munich in 2020. FC Barcelona also has professional teams in other sports like FC Barcelona Regal (basketball), FC Barcelona Handbol (handball), FC Barcelona Hoquei (roller hockey), FC Barcelona Ice Hockey (ice hockey), FC Barcelona Futsal (futsal) and FC Barcelona Rugby (rugby union), all at one point winners of the highest national or European competitions. The club's museum is the second most visited in Catalonia. The matches against cross-town rivals RCD Espanyol are of particular interest, but there are other Barcelonan football clubs in lower categories, like CE Europa and UE Sant Andreu. FC Barcelona's basketball team has a noted rivalry in the Liga ACB with nearby Joventut Badalona.

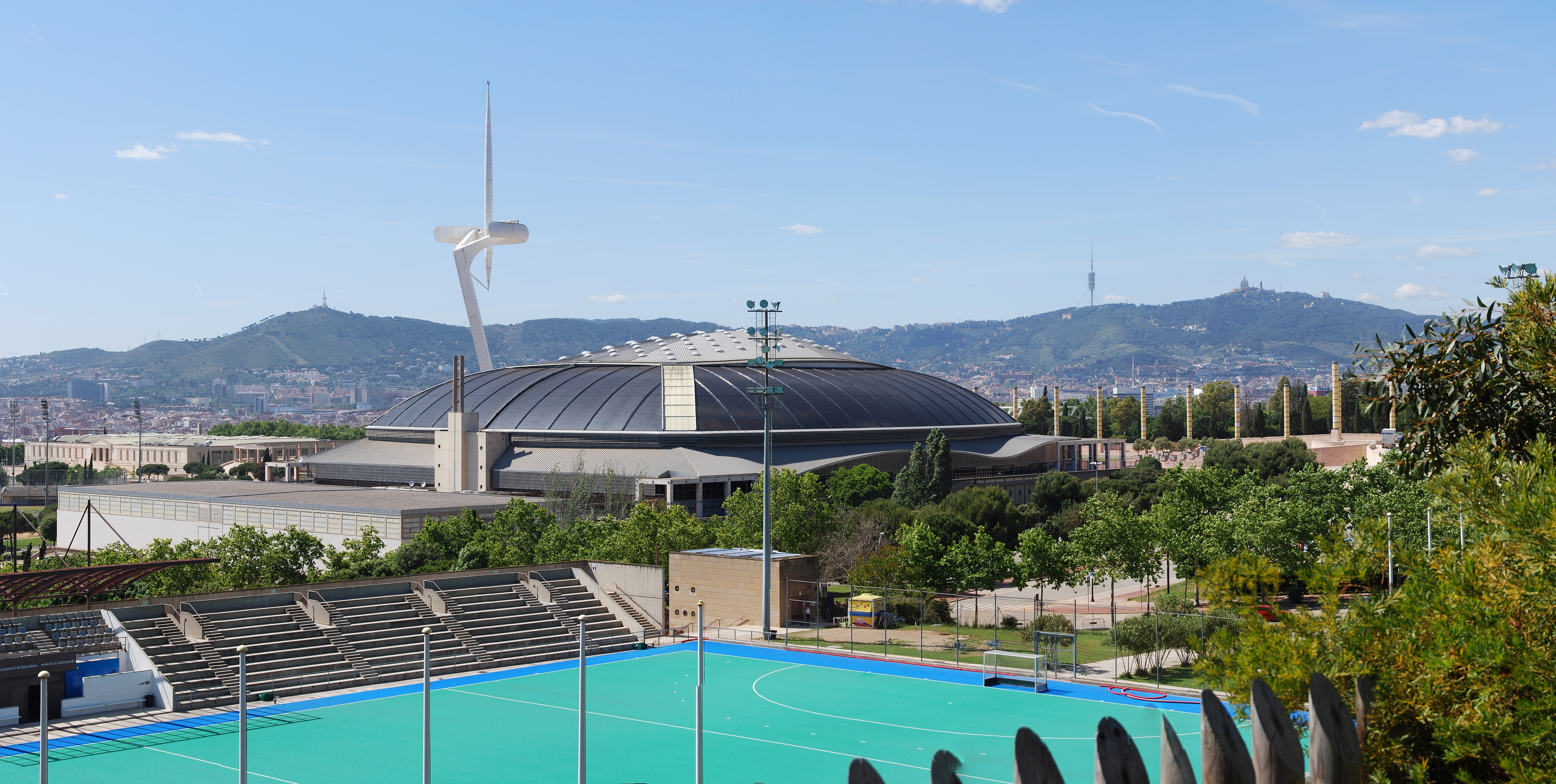
Palau Sant Jordi (St. George's sporting arena) and Montjuïc Communications Tower

Barcelona has three UEFA elite stadiums: FC Barcelona's Camp Nou, the largest stadium in Europe with a capacity of 99,354; the publicly owned Estadi Olímpic Lluís Companys, with a capacity of 55,926; used for the 1992 Olympics; and Estadi Cornellà-El Prat, with a capacity of 40,500. Furthermore, the city has several smaller stadiums such as Mini Estadi (also owned by FC Barcelona) with a capacity of 15,000, Camp Municipal Narcís Sala with a capacity of 6,563 and Nou Sardenya with a capacity of 7,000. The city has a further three multifunctional venues for sports and concerts: the Palau Sant Jordi with a capacity of 12,000 to 24,000 (depending on use), the Palau Blaugrana with a capacity of 7,500, and the Palau dels Esports de Barcelona with a capacity of 3,500.

Barcelona was the host city for the 2013 World Aquatics Championships, which were held at the Palau San Jordi.

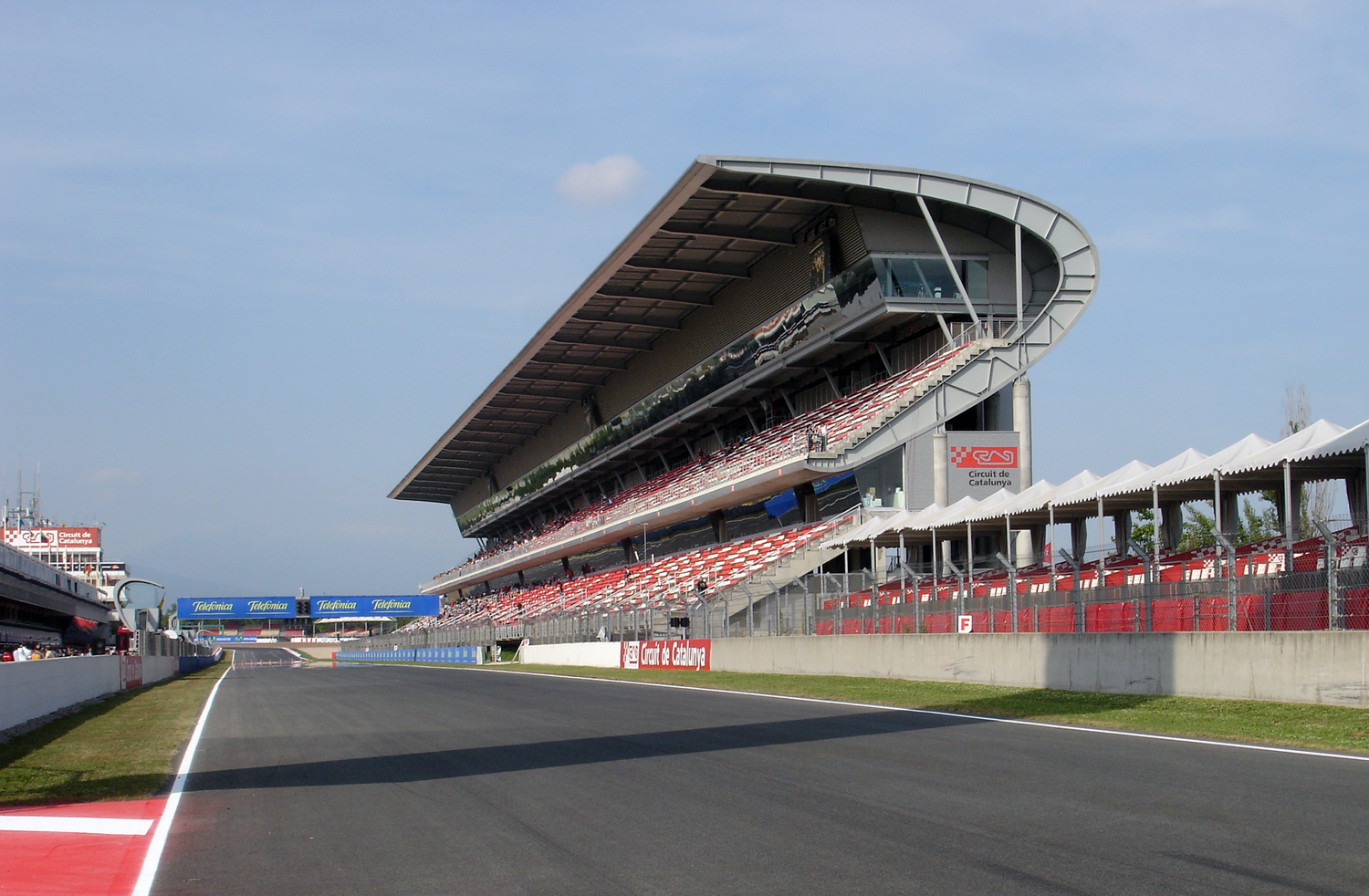
Circuit de Catalunya/Circuit de Barcelona, race track of Formula 1 and MotoGP on the suburb of Barcelona

Several road running competitions are organized year-round in Barcelona: the Barcelona Marathon every March with over 10,000 participants in 2010, the Cursa de Bombers in April, the Cursa de El Corte Inglés in May (with about 60,000 participants each year), the Cursa de la Mercè, the Cursa Jean Bouin, the Milla Sagrada Família and the San Silvestre. There is also the Ultratrail Collserola which passes 85 km (53 mi) through the Collserola forest. The Open Seat Godó, a 50-year-old ATP World Tour 500 Series tennis tournament, is held annually in the facilities of the Real Club de Tenis Barcelona. Each year on Christmas Day, a 200-meter swimming race across the Old Port of Barcelona takes place. Near Barcelona, in Montmeló, the 107,000 capacity Circuit de Barcelona-Catalunya racetrack hosts the Formula One Spanish Grand Prix, the Catalan motorcycle Grand Prix, the Spanish GT Championship and races in the GP2 Series. Skateboarding and cycling are also very popular in Barcelona; in and around the city there are dozens of kilometers of bicycle paths.

=== Squatter movement ===
Barcelona is also home to numerous social centres and illegal squats that effectively form a shadow society mainly made up of the unemployed, immigrants, dropouts, anarchists, anti-authoritarians and autonomists. Peter Gelderloos estimates that there around 200 squatted buildings and 40 social centres across the city with thousands of inhabitants, making it one of the largest squatter movements in the world. He notes that they pirate electricity, internet and water allowing them to live on less than one euro a day. He argues that these squats embrace an anarcho-communist and anti-work philosophy, often freely fixing up new houses, cleaning, patching roofs, installing windows, toilets, showers, lights and kitchens. In the wake of austerity, the squats have provided a number of social services to the surrounding residents, including bicycle repair workshops, carpentry workshops, self-defense classes, free libraries, community gardens, free meals, computer labs, language classes, theatre groups, free medical care and legal support services. The squats help elderly residents avoid eviction and organize various protests throughout Barcelona. Notable squats include Can Vies, Can Masdeu, La Cinètika, Àgora Juan Andrés Benítez and Kasa de la Muntanya.

== Sights ==
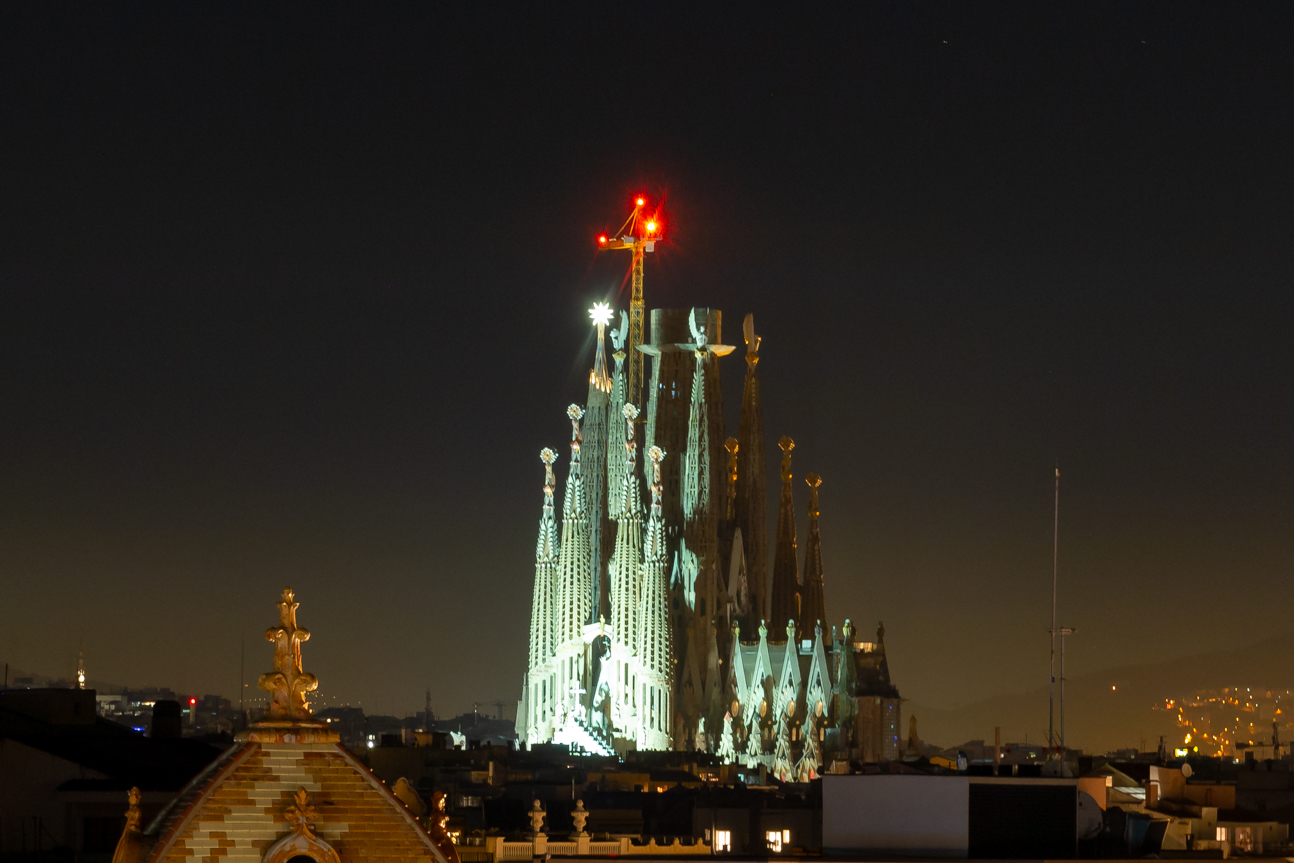
Sagrada Família church at night, designed by Gaudí

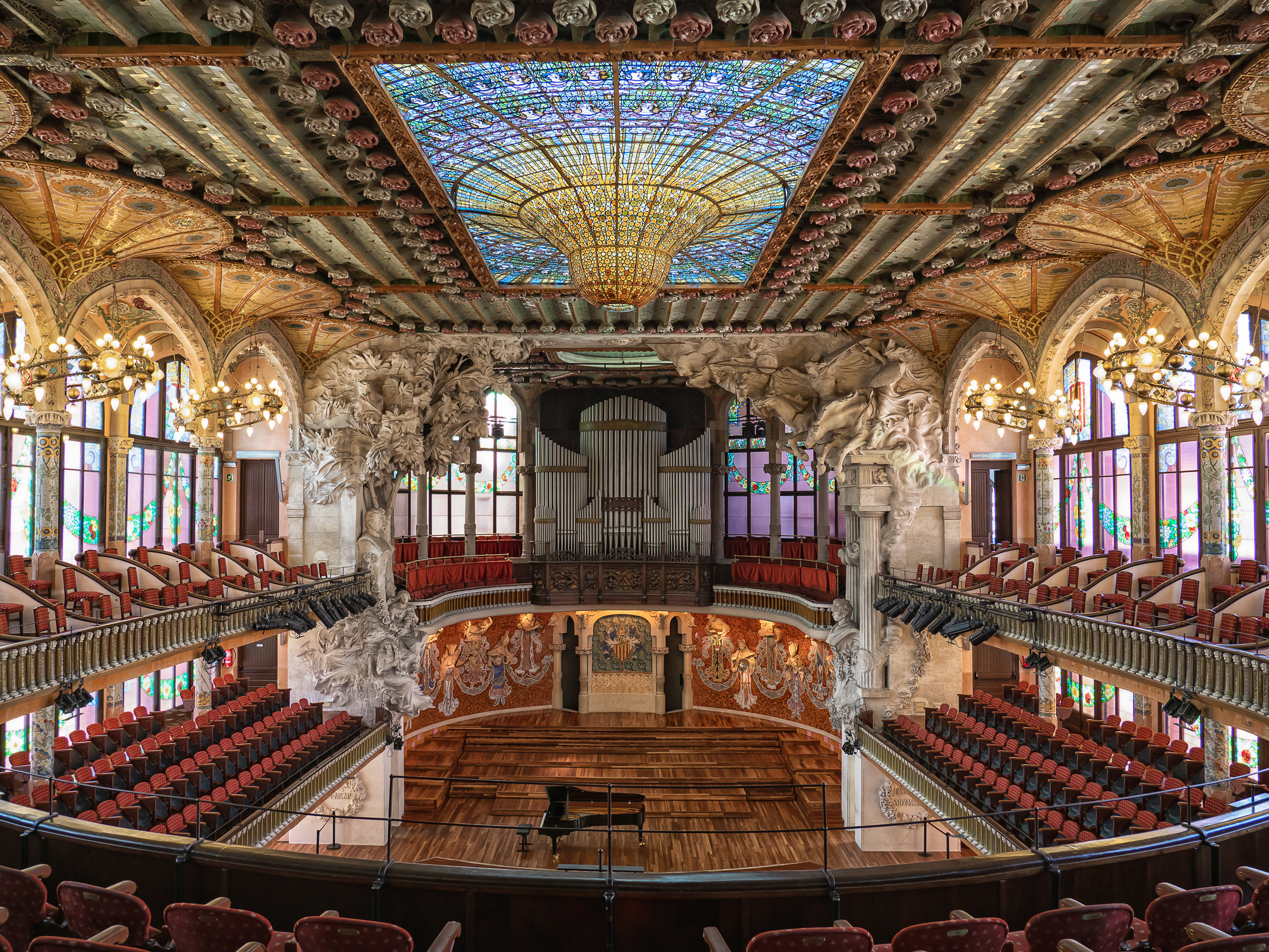
Palau de la Música Catalana

The Barri Gòtic (Catalan for "Gothic Quarter") is the centre of the old city of Barcelona. Many of the buildings date from medieval times, some from as far back as the Roman settlement of Barcelona. Catalan modernista architecture (related to the movement known as Art Nouveau in the rest of Europe) developed between 1885 and 1950 and left an important legacy in Barcelona. Several of these buildings are World Heritage Sites. Especially remarkable is the work of architect Antoni Gaudí, which can be seen throughout the city. His best-known work is the immense but still unfinished church of the Sagrada Família, which has been under construction since 1882 and is still financed by private donations. As of 2015, completion is planned for 2026.

Barcelona was also home to Mies van der Rohe's Barcelona Pavilion. Designed in 1929 for the International Exposition for Germany, it was an iconic building that came to symbolize modern architecture as the embodiment of van der Rohe's aphorisms "less is more" and "God is in the details". The Barcelona pavilion was intended as a temporary structure and was torn down in 1930 less than a year after it was constructed. A modern re-creation by Spanish architects now stands in Barcelona, however, constructed in 1986.

Barcelona won the 1999 RIBA Royal Gold Medal for its architecture, the first (and as of 2015, only) time that the winner has been a city rather than an individual architect. Barcelona is the home of many points of interest declared World Heritage Sites by UNESCO:

=== Historic buildings and monuments ===
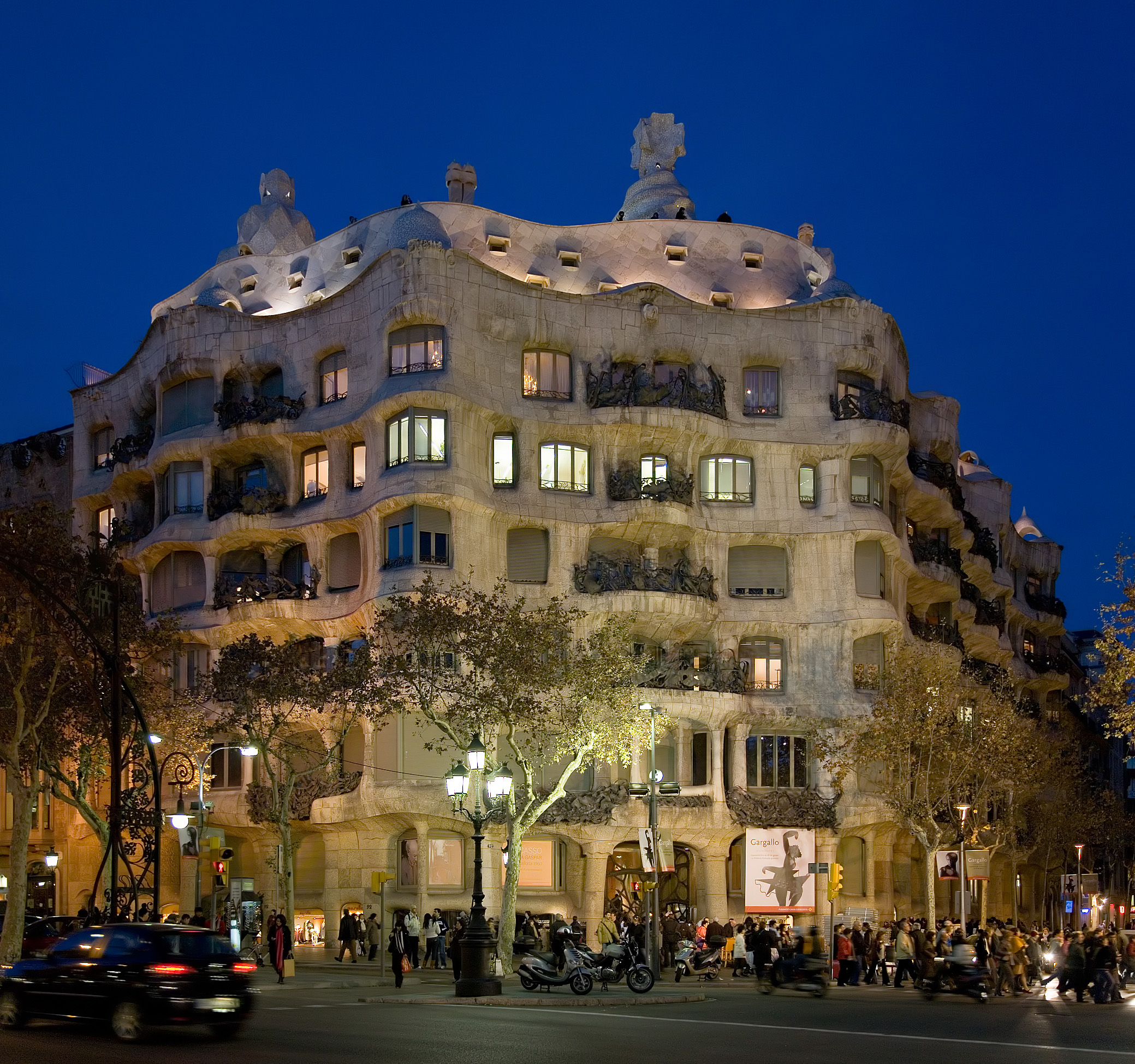
Casa Milà

- Minor basilica of Sagrada Família, the symbol of Barcelona.
- Palau de la Música Catalana and Hospital de Sant Pau, designed by Lluís Domènech i Montaner, included in the UNESCO Heritage List in 1997.
- Works by Antoni Gaudí, including Park Güell, Palau Güell, Casa Milà (La Pedrera), Casa Vicens, Sagrada Família (Nativity façade and crypt), Casa Batlló, crypt in Church of Colònia Güell. The first three works were inscribed as a World Heritage Site in 1984. The other four were added as extensions to the site in 2005.
- The Cathedral of the Holy Cross and St. Eulalia (Gothic)
- Gothic basilica of Santa Maria del Mar
- Gothic basilica of Santa Maria del Pi
- Romanesque church of Sant Pau del Camp
- The Marcùs Chapel, one of the oldest churches in Barcelona
- Palau Reial Major, medieval residence of the sovereign Counts of Barcelona, later Kings of Aragon
- The Royal Shipyard (gothic)
- Monastery of Pedralbes (gothic)
- The Columbus Monument
- The Arc de Triomf, a triumphal arch built for entrance to 1888 Barcelona Universal Exposition.
- Expiatory church of the Sacred Heart of Jesus on the summit of Tibidabo.
- The Historic Building of the University of Barcelona

=== Museums ===
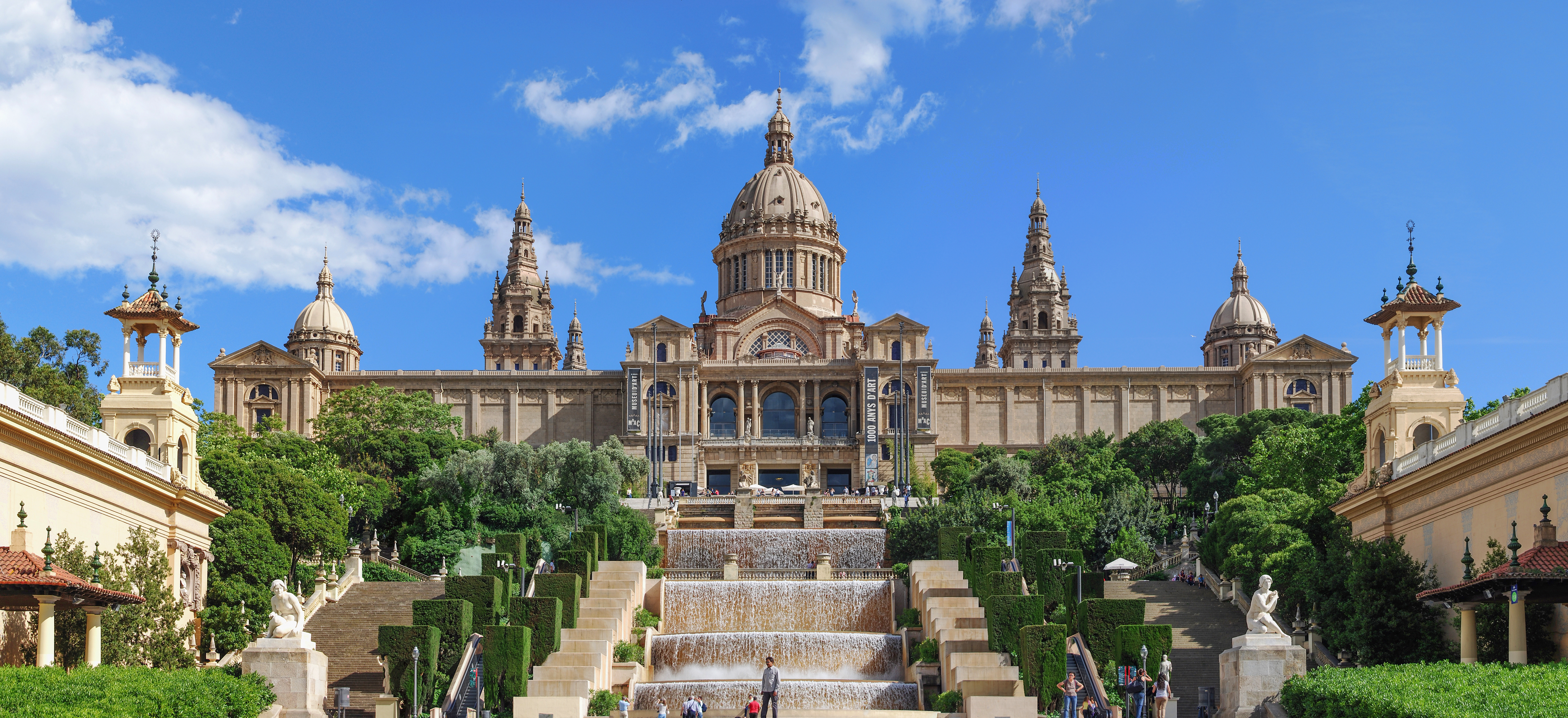
The National Museum of Art of Catalonia stands out for its collection of Romanesque painting.

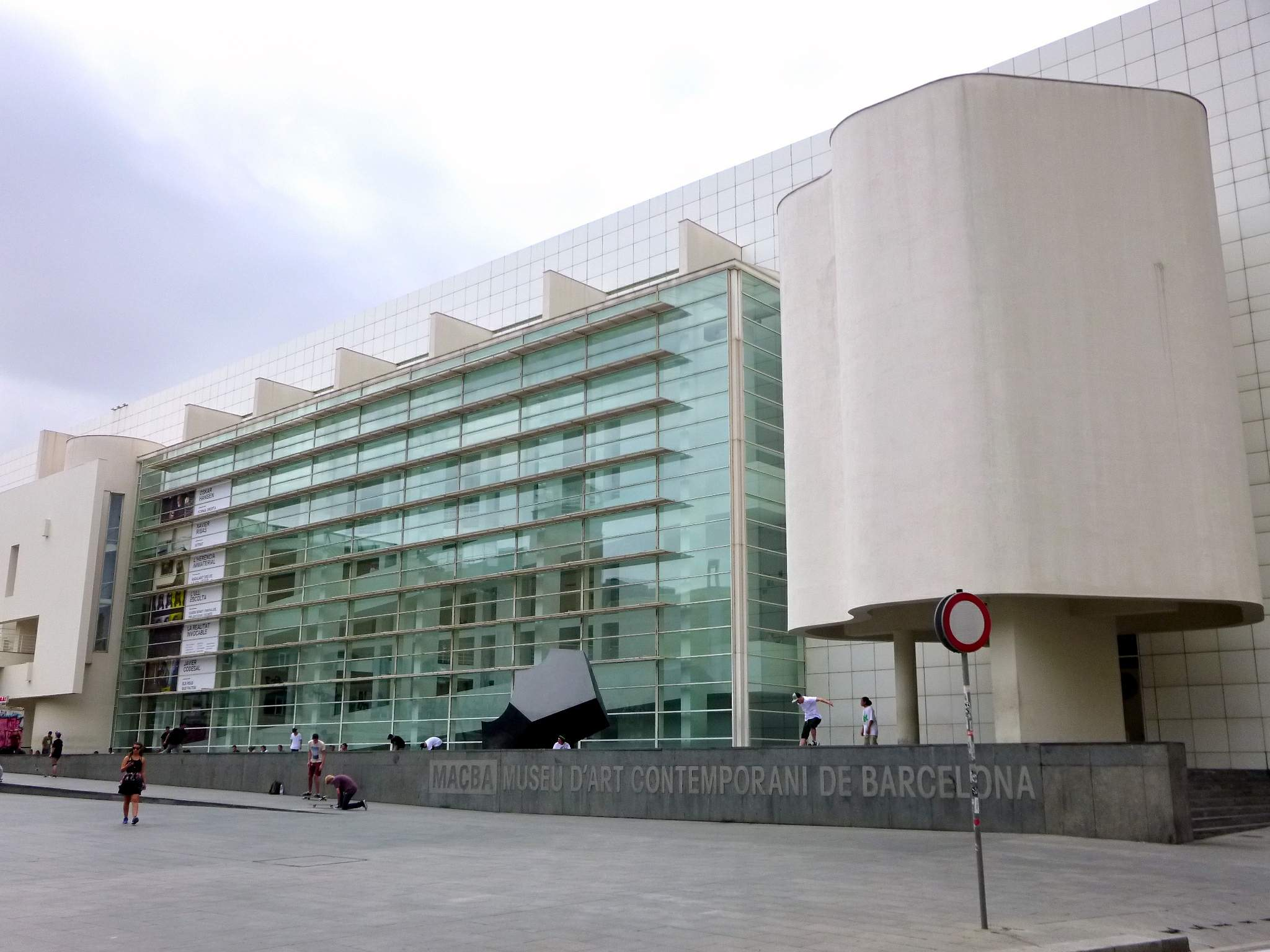
Barcelona Museum of Contemporary Art

Barcelona has many museums, which cover different areas and eras. The National Museum of Art of Catalonia possesses a well-known collection of Romanesque art, while the Barcelona Museum of Contemporary Art focuses on post-1945 Catalan and Spanish art. The Fundació Joan Miró, Picasso Museum, and Fundació Antoni Tàpies hold important collections of these world-renowned artists, as well as the Can Framis Museum, focused on post-1960 Catalan Art owned by Fundació Vila Casas. Several museums cover the fields of history and archaeology, like the Barcelona City History Museum (MUHBA), the Museum of the History of Catalonia, the Archeology Museum of Catalonia, the Maritime Museum of Barcelona, the Music Museum of Barcelona and the privately owned Egyptian Museum of Barcelona. The Erotic museum of Barcelona is among the most peculiar ones, while CosmoCaixa is a science museum that received the European Museum of the Year Award in 2006.

The Museum of Mathematics of Catalonia is a place where mathematics is approached from a practical and playful point of view. The Museum of Natural Sciences of Barcelona was founded in 1882 under the name of "Museo Martorell de Arqueología y Ciencias Naturales" (Spanish for "Martorell Museum of Archaeology and Natural Sciences"). In 2011 the Museum of Natural Sciences ended up with a merge of five institutions: the Museum of Natural Sciences of Barcelona (the main site, at the Forum Building), the Martorell Museum (the historical seat of the Museum, opened to the public from 1924 to 2010 as a geology museum), the Laboratori de Natura, at the Castle of the Three Dragons (from 1920 to 2010: the Zoology Museum), the Historical Botanical Garden of Barcelona, founded 1930, and the Botanical garden of Barcelona, founded 1999. Those two gardens are a part of the Botanical Institute of Barcelona too.

The FC Barcelona Museum is the third most popular tourist attraction in Catalonia, with 1,51 million visitors in 2013.

=== Parks ===
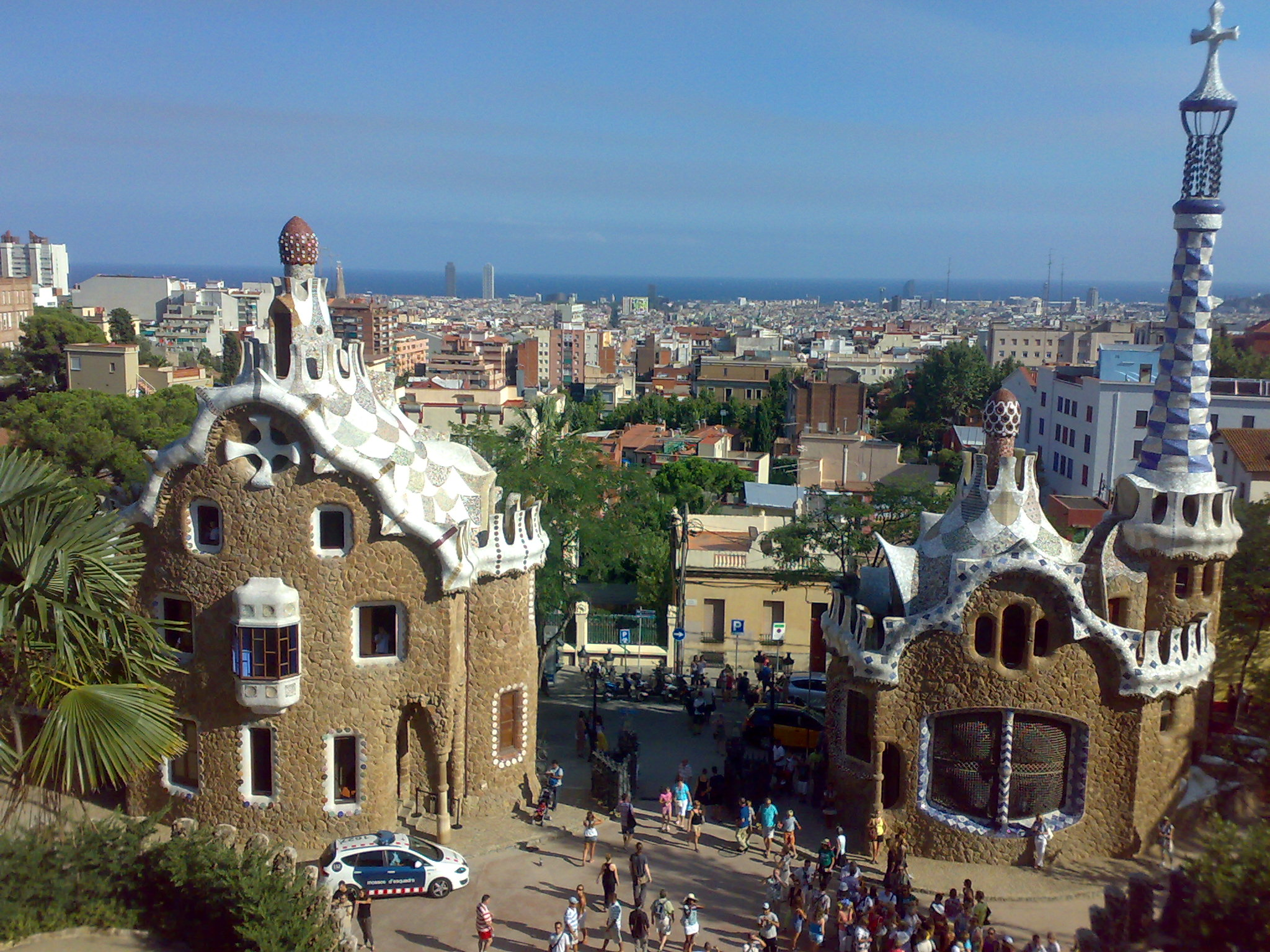
Park Güell

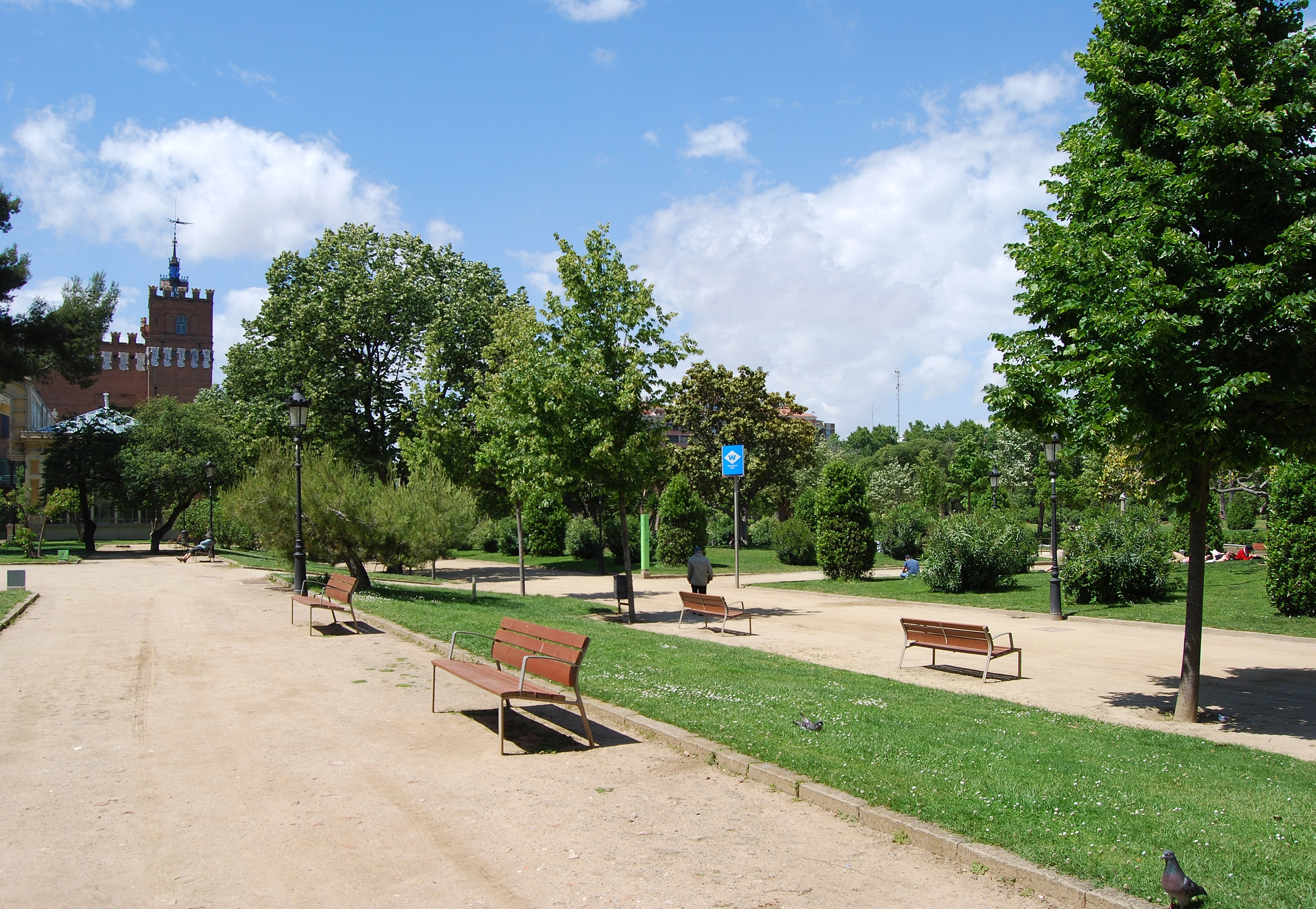
Parc de la Ciutadella north of La Barceloneta

Barcelona contains sixty municipal parks, twelve of which are historic, five of which are thematic (botanical), forty-five of which are urban, and six of which are forest. They range from vest-pocket parks to large recreation areas. The urban parks alone cover 10% of the city (549.7 ha or 1,358.3 acres). The total park surface grows about 10 ha (25 acres) per year, with a proportion of 18.1 m^{2} (195 sq ft) of park area per inhabitant.

Of Barcelona's parks, Montjuïc is the largest, with 203 ha located on the mountain of the same name, and includes the Botanical Garden of Barcelona, the Mossèn Costa i Llobera Gardens, and more. It is followed by Parc de la Ciutadella (which occupies the site of the old citadel and which houses the Parliament building, the Barcelona Zoo, and several museums); 31 ha or 76.6 acres including the zoo), the Guinardó Park (19 ha or 47.0 acres), Park Güell (designed by Antoni Gaudí; 17.2 ha or 42.5 acres), Oreneta Castle Park (also 17.2 ha or 42.5 acres), Diagonal Mar Park (13.3 ha or 32.9 acres, inaugurated in 2002), Nou Barris Central Park (13.2 ha or 32.6 acres), Can Dragó Sports Park and Poblenou Park (both 11.9 ha or 29.4 acres), the Labyrinth Park (9.10 ha or 22.5 acres), named after the garden maze it contains. There are also several smaller parks, for example, the Parc de Les Aigües (2 ha or 4.9 acres). A part of the Collserola Park is also within the city limits. PortAventura World, one of the largest resort in Europe, with 5,837,509 visitors per year, is located one hour's drive from Barcelona. Also, within the city lies Tibidabo Amusement Park, a smaller amusement park in Plaza del Tibidabo, with the Muntanya Russa amusement ride.

Besides the parks managed by the town hall, there exist several self-managed green spaces and gardens such as Jardí del Silenci in Gracia, the Ágora Juan Andrés Benítez in Raval, and L'Horta Alliberada in Sants.

=== Beaches ===
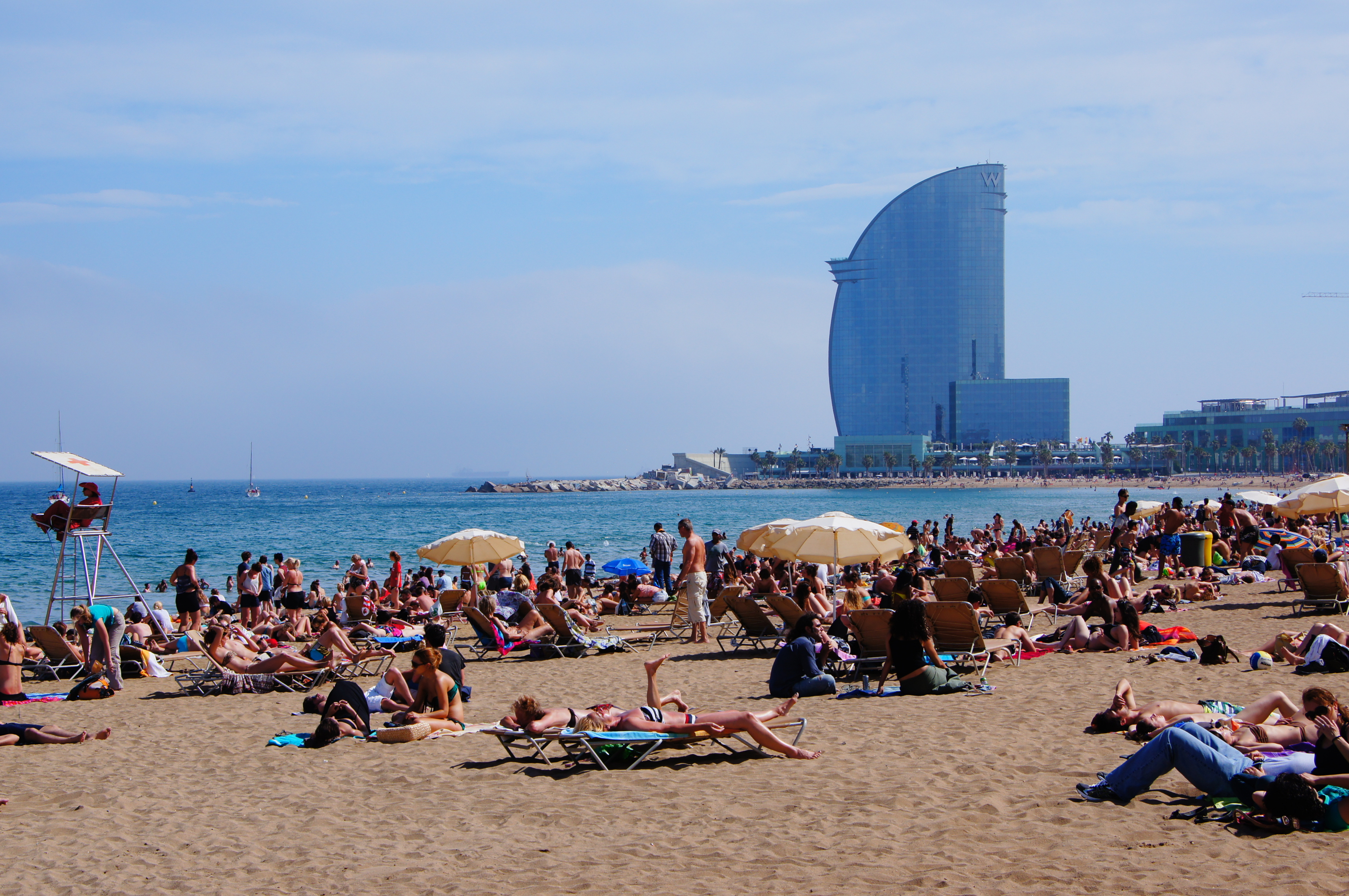
La Barceloneta

Barcelona beach was listed as number one in a list of the top ten city beaches in the world according to National Geographic and Discovery Channel. Barcelona contains seven beaches, totalling 4.5 km (2 3/4 mi) of coastline. Sant Sebastià, Barceloneta and Somorrostro beaches, both 1,100 m (3,610 ft) in length, are the largest, oldest and the most-frequented beaches in Barcelona.

The Olympic Harbour separates them from the other city beaches: Nova Icària, Bogatell, Mar Bella, Nova Mar Bella and Llevant. These beaches (ranging from 400 to 640 m (1,310 to 2,100 ft) were opened as a result of the city restructuring to host the 1992 Summer Olympics, when a great number of industrial buildings were demolished. At present, the beach sand is artificially replenished given that storms regularly remove large quantities of material. The 2004 Universal Forum of Cultures left the city a large concrete bathing zone on the eastmost part of the city's coastline. Most recently, Llevant is the first beach to allow dogs access during summer season.

== Economy ==
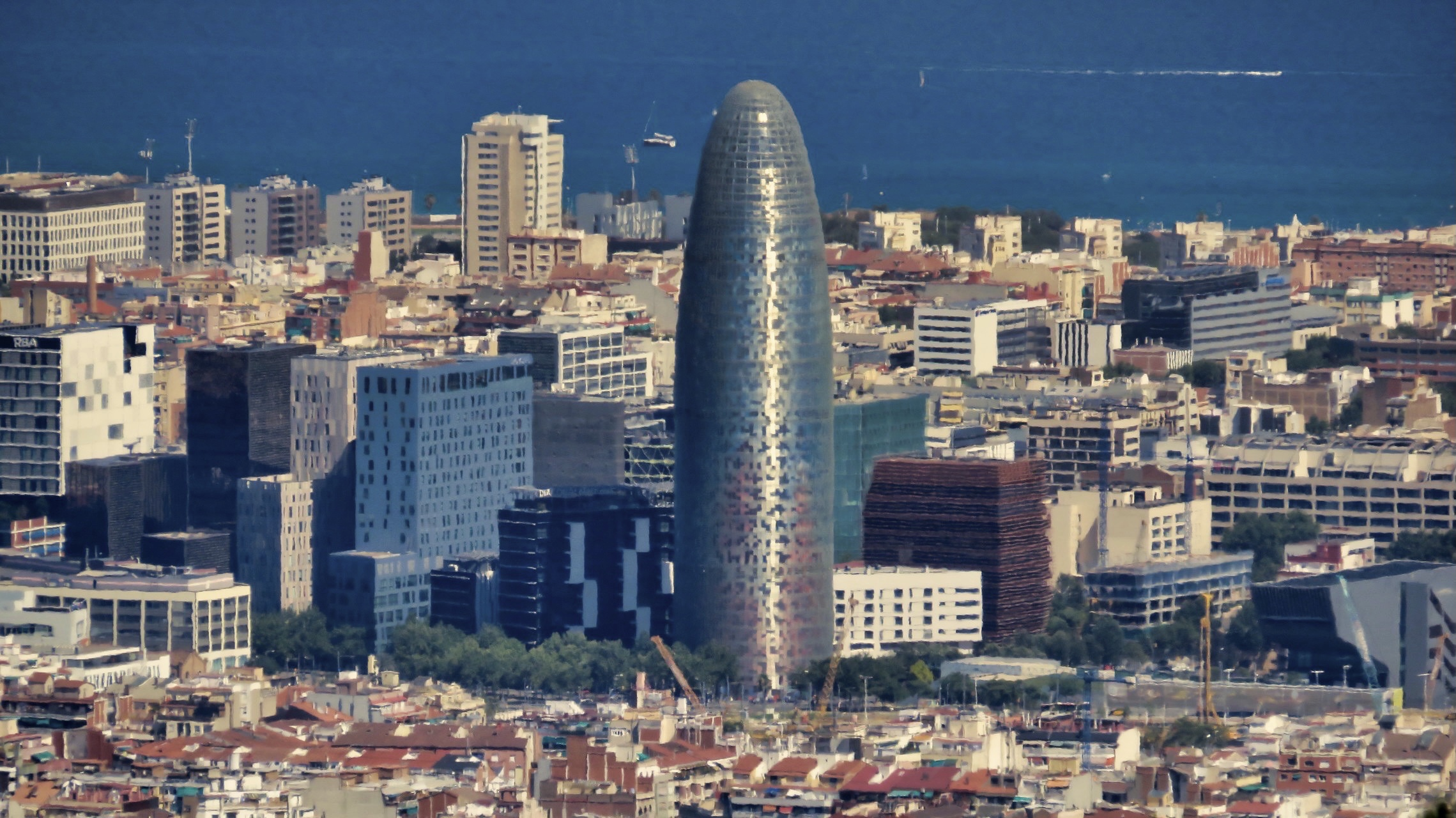
Torre Glòries and the 22@Barcelona business and innovation district

The Barcelona metropolitan area comprises over 66% of the people of Catalonia, one of the richer regions in Europe and the fourth richest region per capita in Spain, with a GDP per capita amounting to €28,400 (16% more than the EU average). The greater Barcelona metropolitan area had a GDP amounting to $177 billion (equivalent to $34,821 in per capita terms, 44% more than the EU average), making it the 4th most economically powerful city by gross GDP in the European Union, and 35th in the world in 2009. Barcelona city had a very high GDP of €80,894 per head in 2004, according to Eurostat. Furthermore, Barcelona was Europe's fourth best business city and fastest improving European city, with growth improved by 17% per year as of 2009.

Barcelona was the 24th most "livable city" in the world in 2015 according to lifestyle magazine Monocle. Similarly, according to Innovation Analysts 2thinknow, Barcelona occupies 13th place in the world on Innovation Cities™ Global Index. At the same time it is according to the Global Wealth and Lifestyle Report 2020 one of the most affordable cities in the world for a luxury lifestyle.

Barcelona has a long-standing mercantile tradition. Less well known is that the city industrialized early, taking off in 1833, when Catalonia's already sophisticated textile industry began to use steam power. It became the first and most important industrial city in the Mediterranean basin. Since then, manufacturing has played a large role in its history.

Borsa de Barcelona (Barcelona Stock Exchange) is the main stock exchange in the northeastern part of the Iberian Peninsula.

Barcelona was recognized as the Southern European City of the Future for 2014/15, based on its economic potential, by FDi Magazine in their bi-annual rankings.

=== Trade fair and exhibitions ===
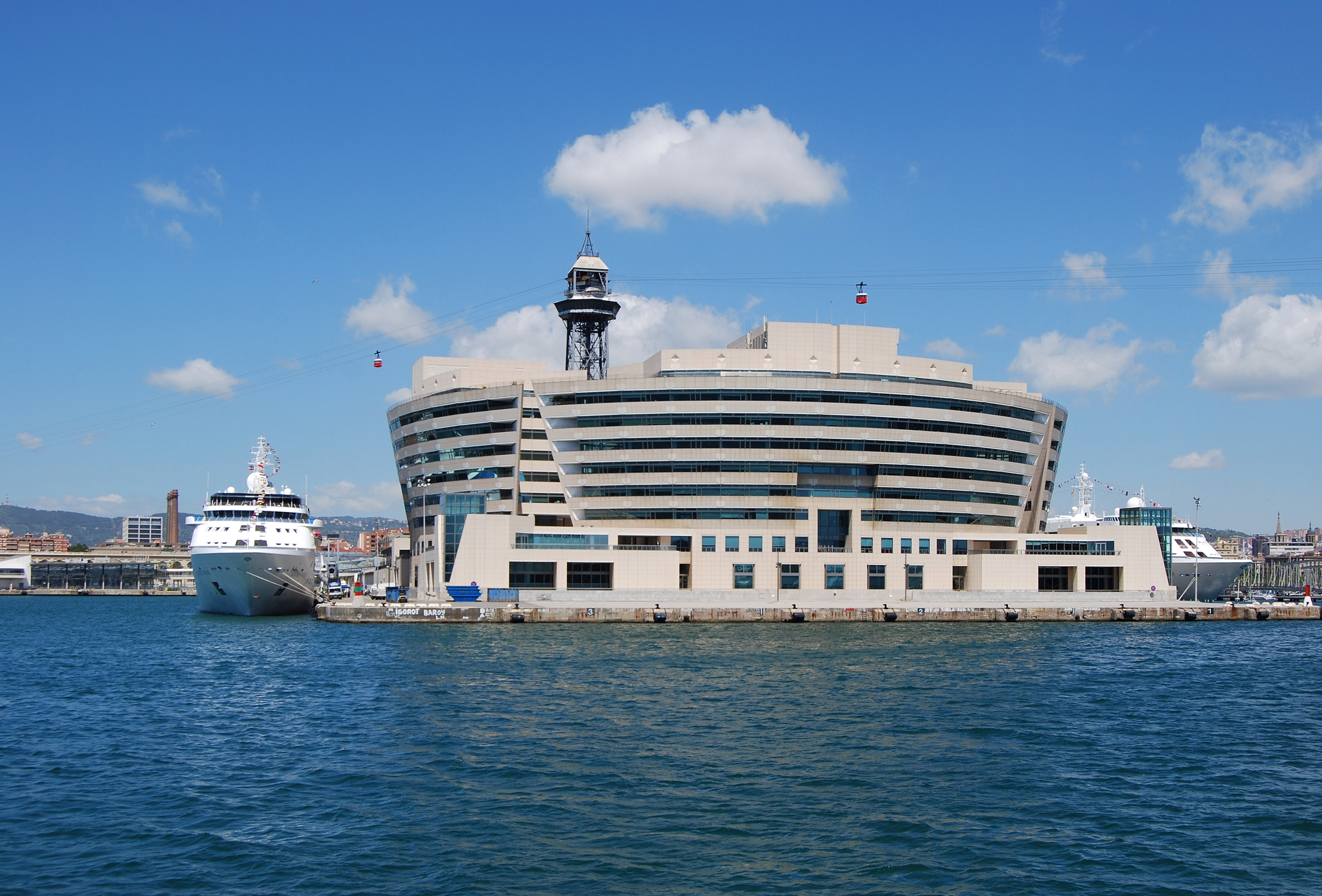
The World Trade Center Barcelona

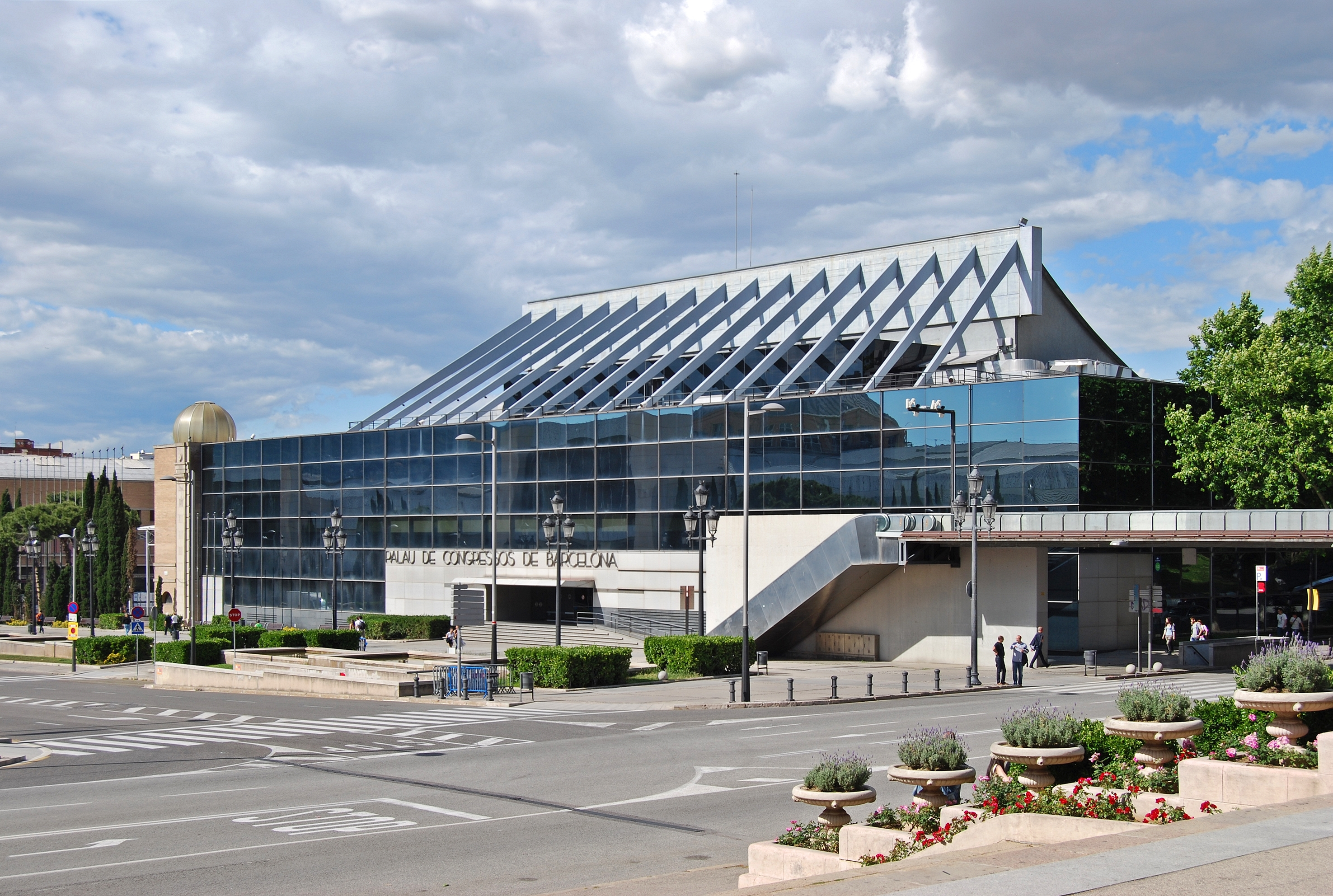
The Palau de Congressos de Barcelona

It also has several congress halls, notably Fira de Barcelona – the second largest trade fair and exhibition centre in Europe, that host a quickly growing number of national and international events each year (at present above 50). The total exhibition floor space of Fira de Barcelona venues is 405,000 m^{2} (41 ha), not counting Gran Via centre on the Plaza de Europa. However, the Eurozone crisis and deep cuts in business travel affected the council's positioning of the city as a convention centre.

An important business centre, the World Trade Center Barcelona, is located in Barcelona's Port Vell harbour.

The city is known for hosting well as world-class conferences and expositions, including the 1888 Exposición Universal de Barcelona, the 1929 Barcelona International Exposition (Expo 1929), the 2004 Universal Forum of Cultures and the 2004 World Urban Forum.

=== Tourism ===
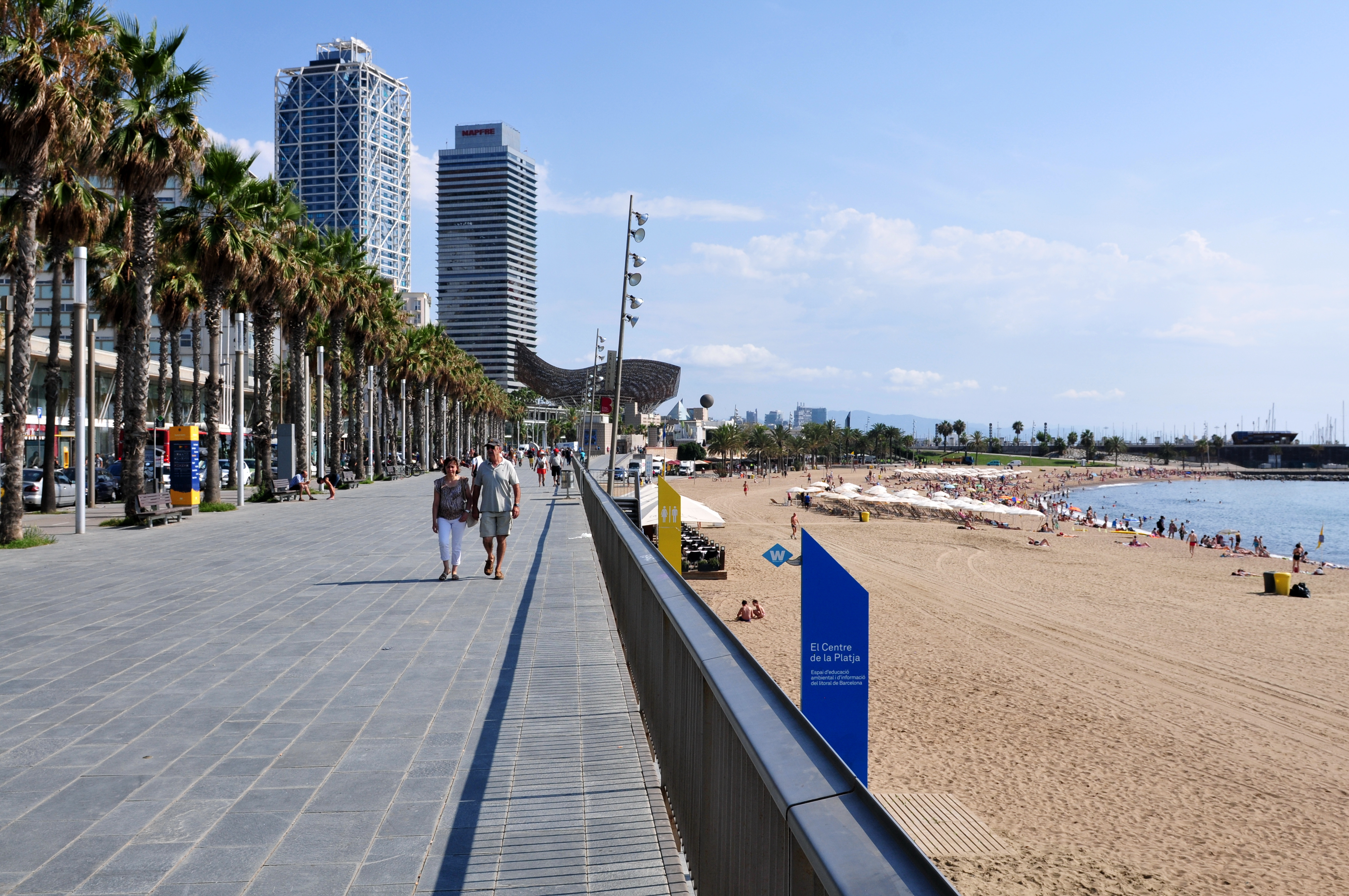
Part of the beach promenade and the beach of La Barceloneta towards Port Olímpic

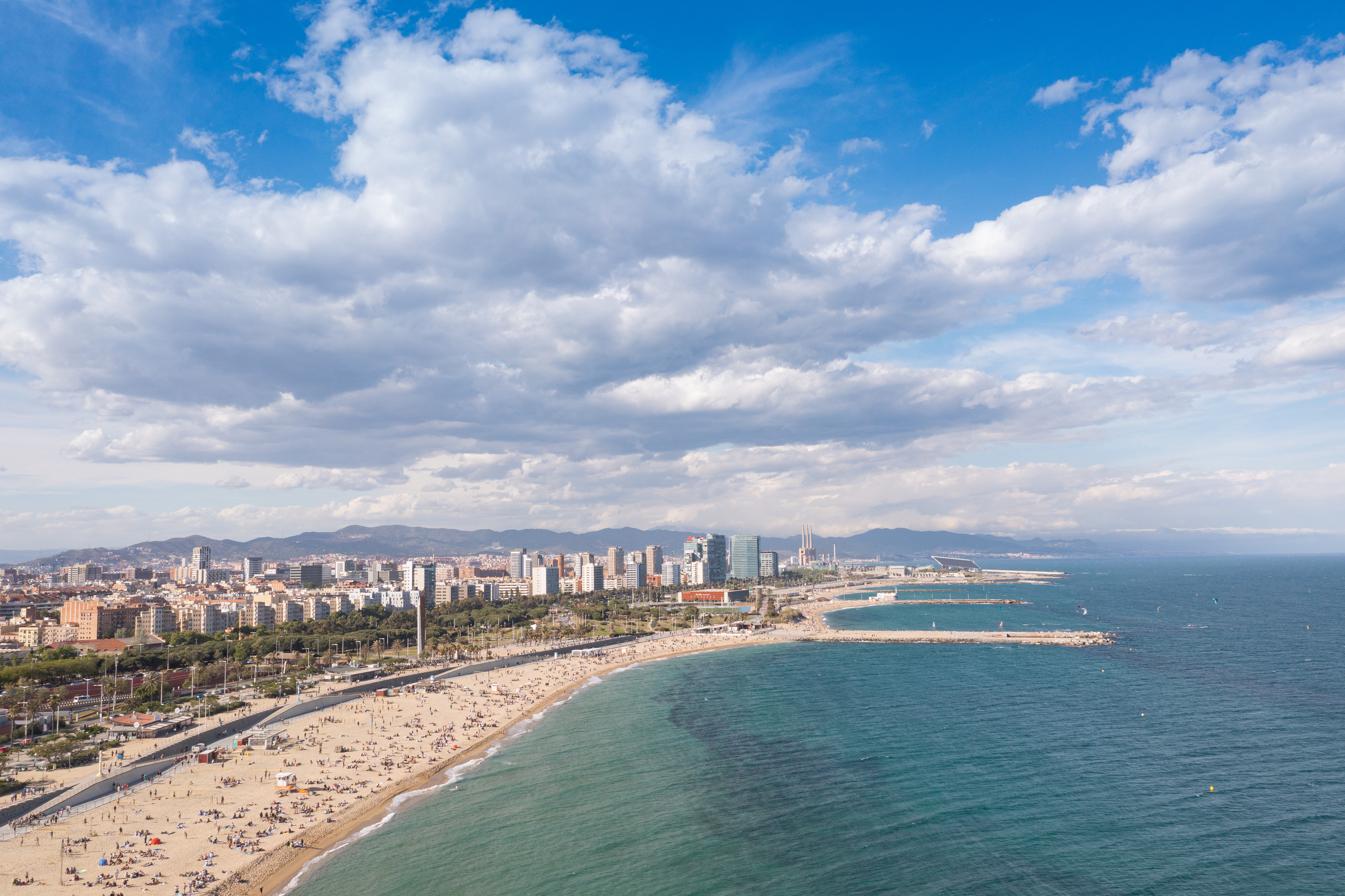
Beaches of Barcelona

In 2023, Barcelona was the 9th most visited city in the world by international visitors and the fifth most visited city in Europe after Paris, Madrid, Amsterdam, and Rome, with around 9 million international arrivals. Barcelona is an internationally renowned tourist destination, with numerous recreational areas, one of the best beaches in the world, mild and warm climate, historical monuments, including eight UNESCO World Heritage Sites, 519 hotels as of March 2016 including 35 five-star hotels, and developed tourist infrastructure.

Due to its large influx of tourists each year, Barcelona, like many other tourism capitals, has to deal with pickpockets, with wallets and passports being commonly stolen items. Despite its moderate pickpocket rate, Barcelona is considered one of the safest cities in terms of security and personal safety, mainly because of a sophisticated policing strategy that has dropped crime by 32% in just over three years and has led it to be considered the 15th safest city in the world by Business Insider in 2016.

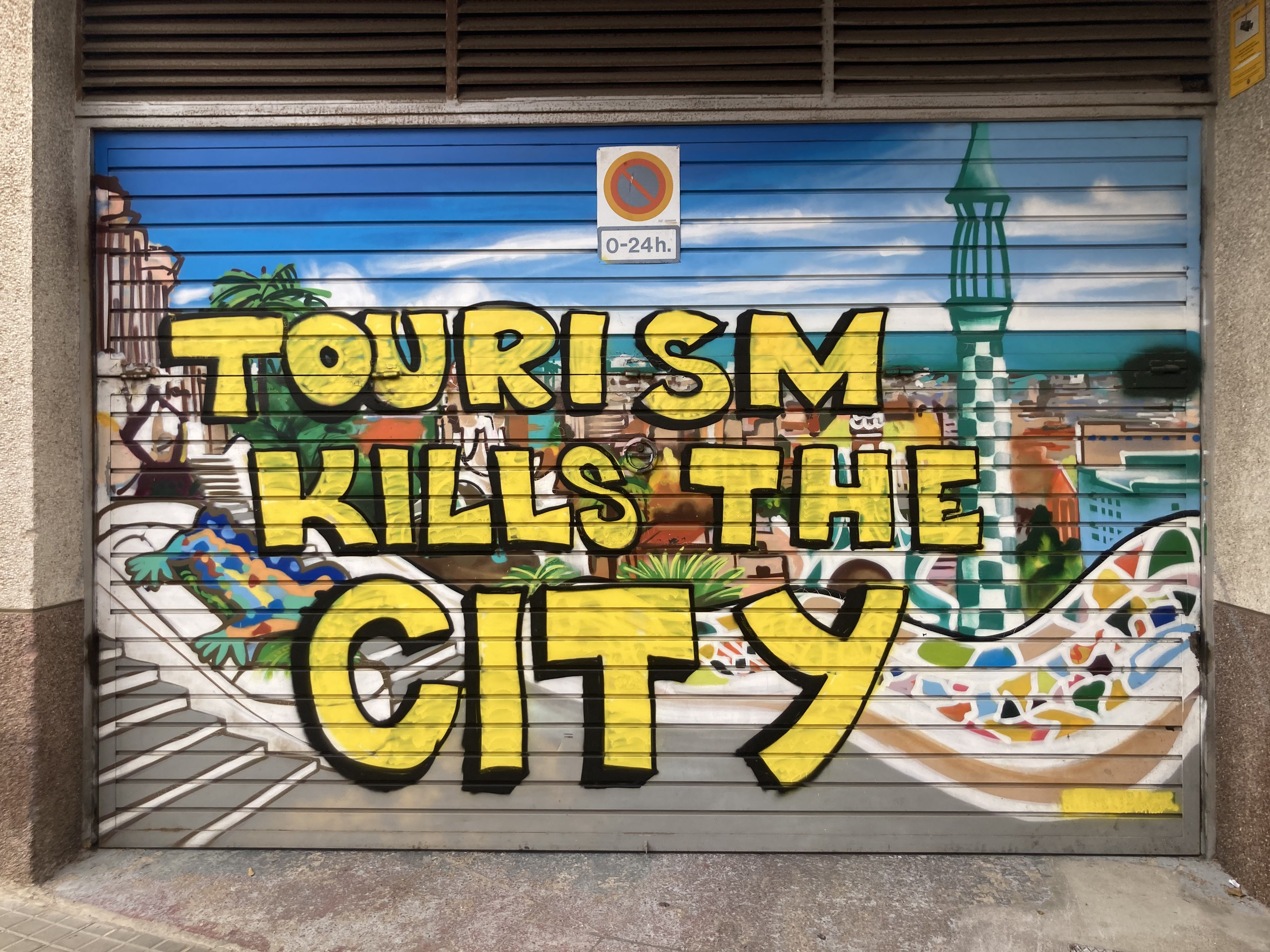
Street art rejecting tourists

While tourism produces economic benefits, according to one report, the city is "overrun [by] hordes of tourists". In early 2017, over 150,000 protesters warned that tourism is destabilizing the city. Slogans included "Tourists go home", "Barcelona is not for sale" and "We will not be driven out". By then, the number of visitors had increased from 1.7 million in 1990 to 32 million in a city with a population of 1.62 million, increasing the cost of rental housing for residents and overcrowding the public places. While tourists spent an estimated €30 billion in 2017, they are viewed by some as a threat to Barcelona's identity.

A May 2017 article in the British online daily The Independent included Barcelona among the "Eight Places That Hate Tourists the Most" and included a comment from Mayor Ada Colau, "We don't want the city to become a cheap souvenir shop", citing Venice as an example. To moderate the problem, the city has stopped issuing licenses for new hotels and holiday apartments; it also fined AirBnb €30,000. The mayor has suggested introducing a new tourist tax and setting a limit on the number of visitors. One industry insider, Justin Francis, founder of the Responsible Travel agency, stated that steps must be taken to limit the number of visitors that are causing an "overtourism crisis" in several major European cities. "Ultimately, residents must be prioritised over tourists for housing, infrastructure and access to services because they have a long-term stake in the city's success", he said. "Managing tourism more responsibly can help", Francis later told a journalist, "but some destinations may just have too many tourists, and Barcelona may be a case of that". In April 2024 protests against overtourism began in the city, reaching its peak in July 2024. These protests caught further attention again in July 2025, as similar protests took place in Southern Europe and included Palma, and Lisbon, organized by the Southern Europe Network Against Touristification (SET). During the protests some protesters used large water guns to spray water on tourists.

=== Manufacturing sector ===
Industry generates 21% of the total gross domestic product (GDP) of the region, with the energy, chemical and metallurgy industries accounting for 47% of industrial production. The Barcelona metropolitan area had 67% of the total number of industrial establishments in Catalonia as of 1997.

Barcelona has long been an important European automobile manufacturing centre. Formerly there were automobile factories of AFA, Abadal, Actividades Industriales, Alvarez, America, Artés de Arcos, Balandrás, Baradat-Esteve, Biscúter, J. Castro, Clúa, David, Delfín, Díaz y Grilló, Ebro trucks, Edis, Elizalde, Automóviles España, Eucort, Fenix, Fábrica Hispano, Auto Academia Garriga, Fábrica Española de Automóviles Hebe, Hispano-Suiza, Huracán Motors, Talleres Hereter, Junior SL, Kapi, La Cuadra, M.A., Automóviles Matas, Motores y Motos, Nacional Custals, National Pescara, Nacional RG, Nacional Rubi, Nacional Sitjes, Automóviles Nike, Orix, Otro Ford, Patria, Pegaso, PTV, Ricart, Ricart-España, Industrias Salvador, Siata Española, Stevenson, Romagosa y Compañía, Garaje Storm, Talleres Hereter, Trimak, Automóviles Victoria, Manufacturas Mecánicas Aleu.

Today, the headquarters and a large factory of SEAT (the largest Spanish automobile manufacturer) are in one of its suburbs. There is also a Nissan factory in the logistics and industrial area of the city. The factory of Derbi, a large manufacturer of motorcycles, scooters and mopeds, also lies near the city.

As in other modern cities, the manufacturing sector has long since been overtaken by the services sector, though it remains very important. The region's leading industries are textiles, chemical, pharmaceutical, motor, electronic, printing, logistics, publishing, in telecommunications industry and culture the notable Mobile World Congress, and information technology services.

=== Fashion ===
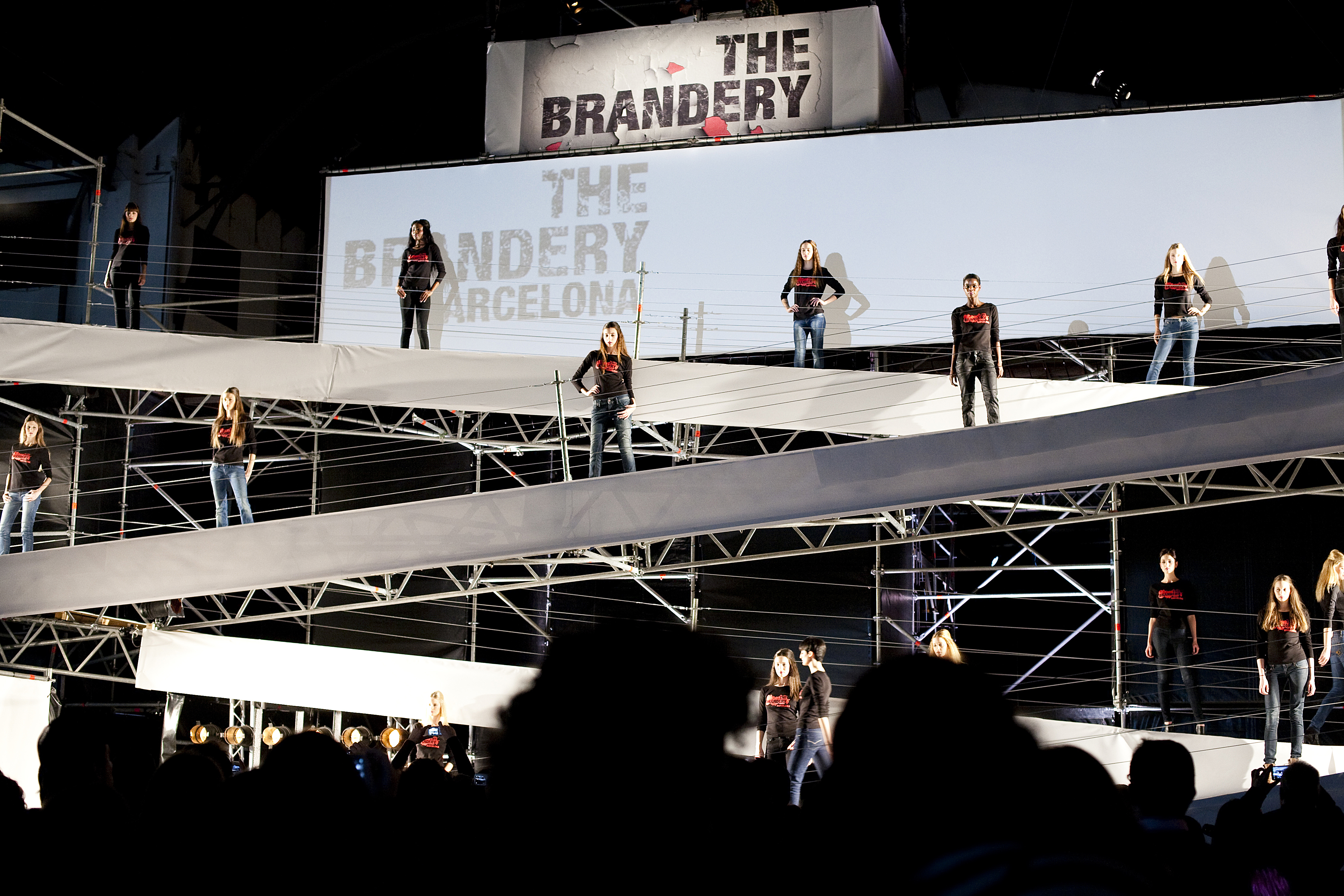
The Brandery fashion show of 2011

The traditional importance of textiles is reflected in Barcelona's drive to become a major fashion centre. There have been many attempts to launch Barcelona as a fashion capital, notably Gaudi Home.

Beginning in the summer of 2000, the city hosted the Bread & Butter urban fashion fair until 2009, when its organizers announced that it would be returning to Berlin. This was a hard blow for the city as the fair brought €100 m to the city in just three days.

From 2009, The Brandery, an urban fashion show, was held in Barcelona twice a year until 2012. According to the Global Language Monitor's annual ranking of the world's top fifty fashion capitals Barcelona was named as the seventh most important fashion capital of the world right after Milan and before Berlin in 2015.

=== Technology ===
Several technology companies have offices in Barcelona, most of them in the El Poblenou neighborhood. Examples of technology companies based in Barcelona: Factorial, Glovo, TravelPerk, Wallapop, EDreams.

Technology companies not based in Barcelona but having an office in the city include Oracle Corporation, Amazon (company), King (company), Dynatrace, Clarivate, Ocado, Sage Group, Smallpdf, Proton Mail, Hewlett-Packard, Personio, Semrush.

Barcelona was ranked as the number 1 startup hub in Southern Europe, and as the 33rd best city in the Global Started Ecosystem published by Startupblink.

The Barcelona Supercomputing Center is located in Barcelona and hosts the MareNostrum supercomputer.

== Education ==
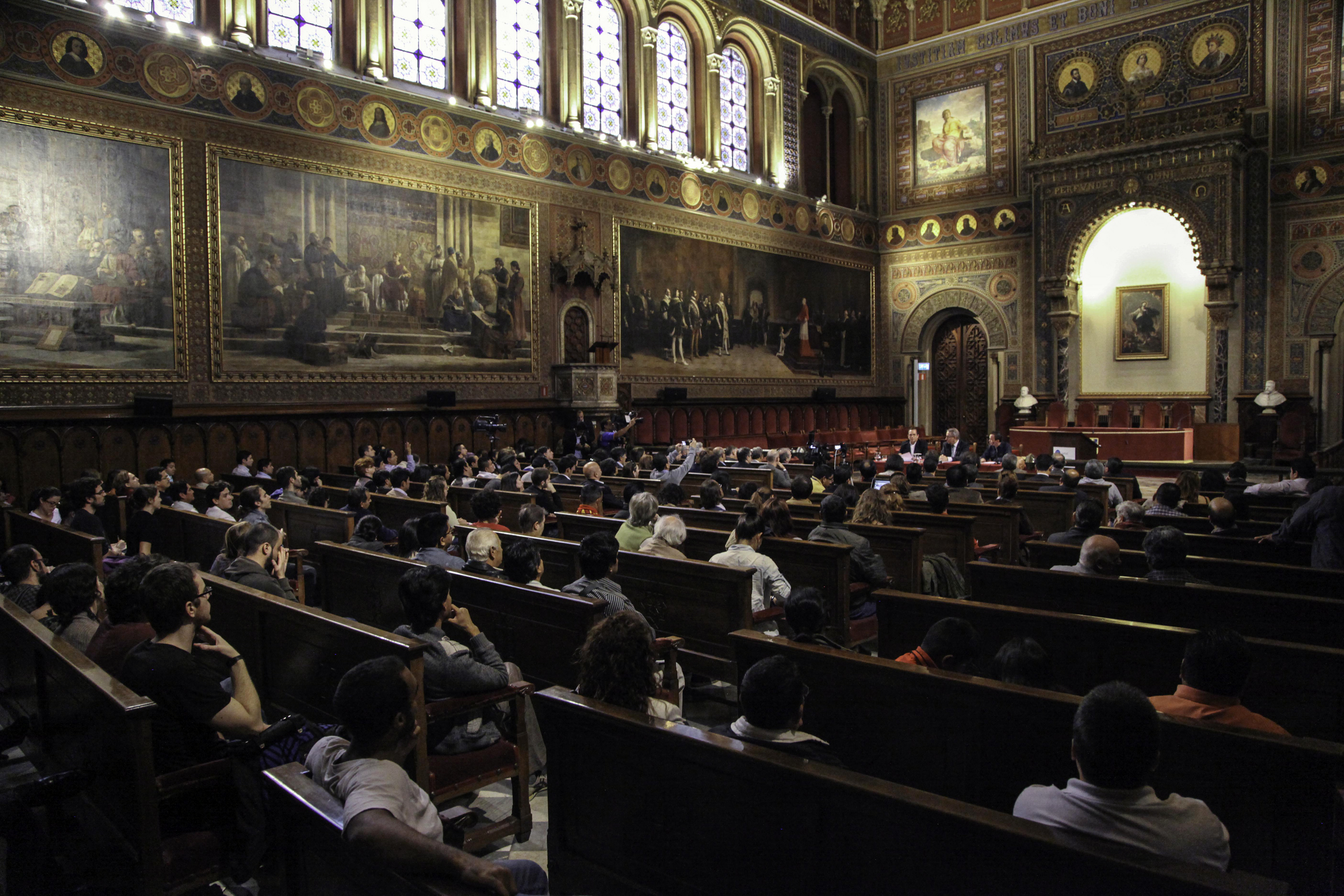
Main hall of the University of Barcelona

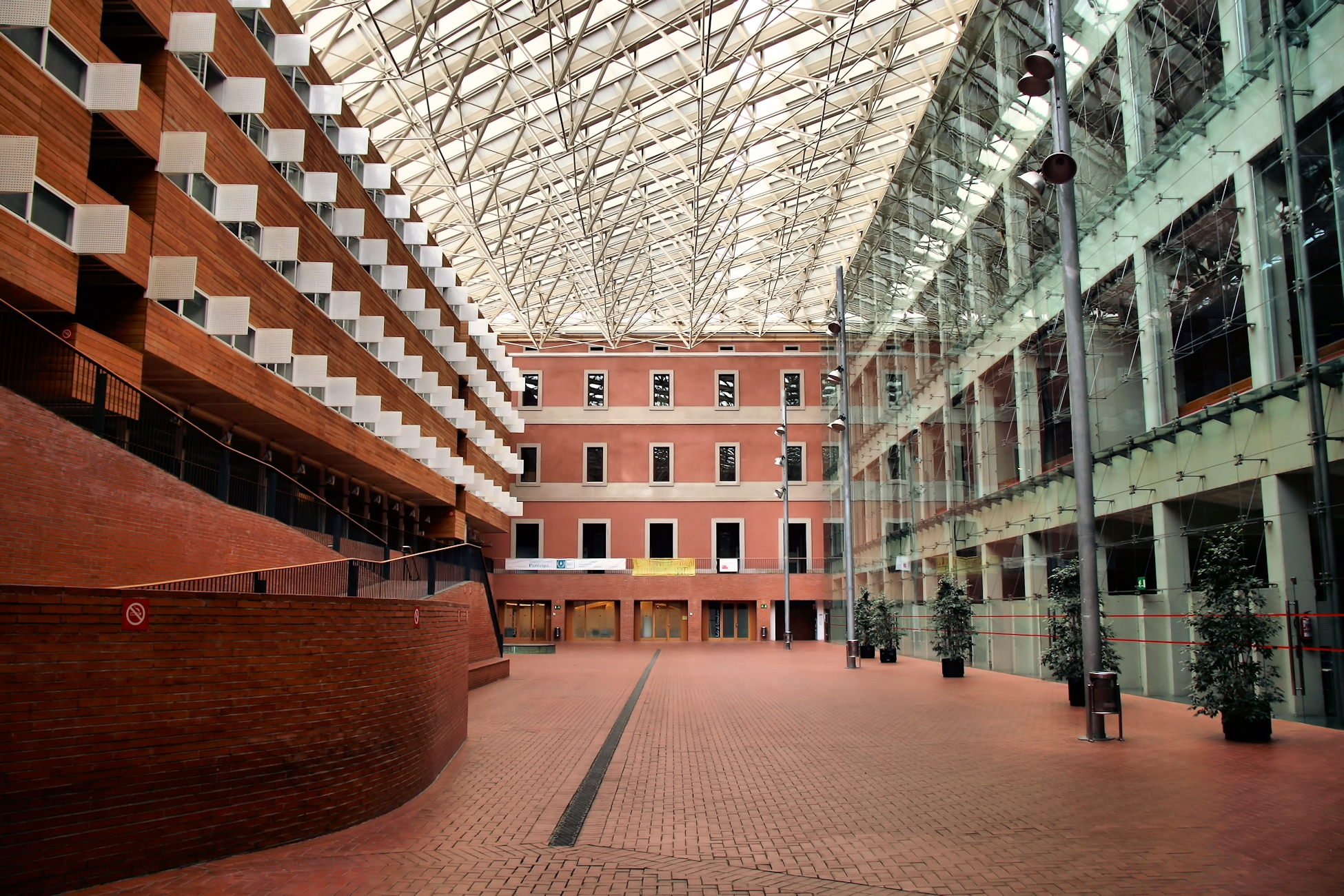
Roger de Llúria building at Campus de la Ciutadella, Pompeu Fabra University

Barcelona has a well-developed higher education system of public universities. Most prominent among these are the University of Barcelona (established in 1450) and the more modern Pompeu Fabra University. Barcelona is also home to the Polytechnic University of Catalonia, and in the private sector the EADA Business School (founded in 1957), which became the first Barcelona institution to run manager training programmes for the business community. IESE Business School, as well as the largest private educational institution, the Ramon Llull University, which encompasses schools and institutes such as the ESADE Business School. The Autonomous University of Barcelona, another public university, is located in Bellaterra, a town in the Metropolitan Area. Toulouse Business School and the Open University of Catalonia (a private Internet-centred open university) are also based in Barcelona.

The city has a network of public schools, from nurseries to high schools, under the responsibility of a consortium led by city council (though the curriculum is the responsibility of the Generalitat de Catalunya). There are also many private schools, some of them Roman Catholic. Most such schools receive a public subsidy on a per-student basis, are subject to inspection by the public authorities, and are required to follow the same curricular guidelines as public schools, though they charge tuition. Known as escoles concertades, they are distinct from schools whose funding is entirely private (escoles privades).

The language of instruction at public schools and escoles concertades is Catalan, as stipulated by the 2009 Catalan Education Act. Spanish may be used as a language of instruction by teachers of Spanish literature or language, and foreign languages by teachers of those languages. An experimental partial immersion programme adopted by some schools allows for the teaching of a foreign language (English, generally) across the curriculum, though this is limited to a maximum of 30% of the school day. No public school or escola concertada in Barcelona may offer 50% or full immersion programmes in a foreign language, nor does any public school or escola concertada offer International Baccalaureate programmes.

== Transport ==
=== Air ===
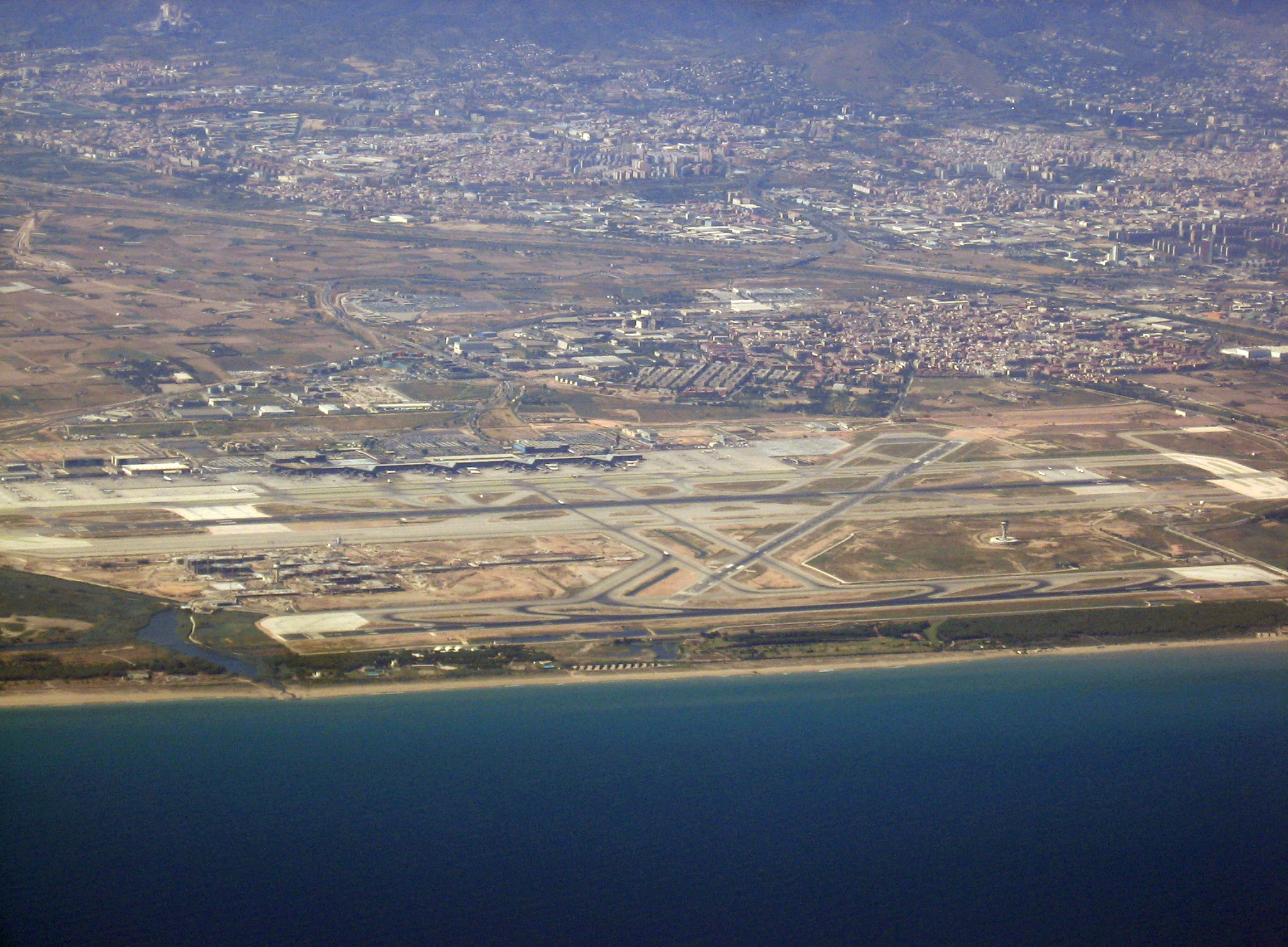
Barcelona–El Prat Airport as seen from the air

Barcelona is served by Barcelona-El Prat Airport, about 17 km (11 mi) south-west of the centre of Barcelona. It is the second-largest airport in Spain, and the largest on the Mediterranean coast, which handled more than 50.17 million passengers in 2018, showing an annual upward trend. It is a main hub for Vueling Airlines and Ryanair, and also a focus for Iberia and Air Europa. The airport mainly serves domestic and European destinations, although some airlines offer destinations in Latin America, Asia and the United States. The airport is connected to the city by highway, metro (Airport T1 and Airport T2 stations), commuter train (Barcelona Airport railway station) and scheduled bus service. A new terminal (T1) has been built, and entered service on 17 June 2009.

Some low-cost airlines, also use Girona-Costa Brava Airport, about 90 km (56 mi) to the north, Reus Airport, 77 km (48 mi) to the south, or Lleida-Alguaire Airport, about 150 km (93 mi) to the west, of the city. Sabadell Airport is a smaller airport in the nearby town of Sabadell, devoted to pilot training, aerotaxi and private flights.

The city has several heliports, mainly at the top of hospitals or tall buildings. However, only one heliport is public, the Port of Barcelona Heliport.

=== Seaport ===
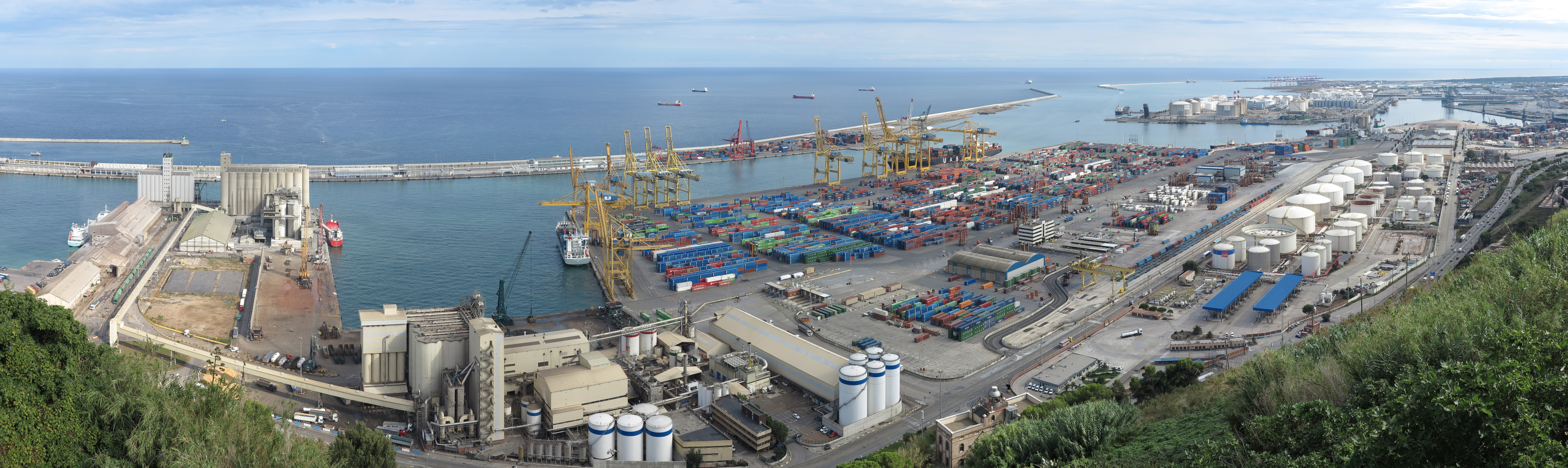
The Port of Barcelona

The Port of Barcelona has a 2000-year-old history and a great contemporary commercial importance. It is Europe's ninth largest container port, with a trade volume of 1.72 million TEU's in 2013. The port is managed by the Port Authority of Barcelona. Its 10 km^{2} (4 sq mi) are divided into three zones: Port Vell (the old port), the commercial port and the logistics port (Barcelona Free Port). The port is undergoing an enlargement that will double its size thanks to diverting the mouth of the Llobregat river 2 km (1 mi) to the south.

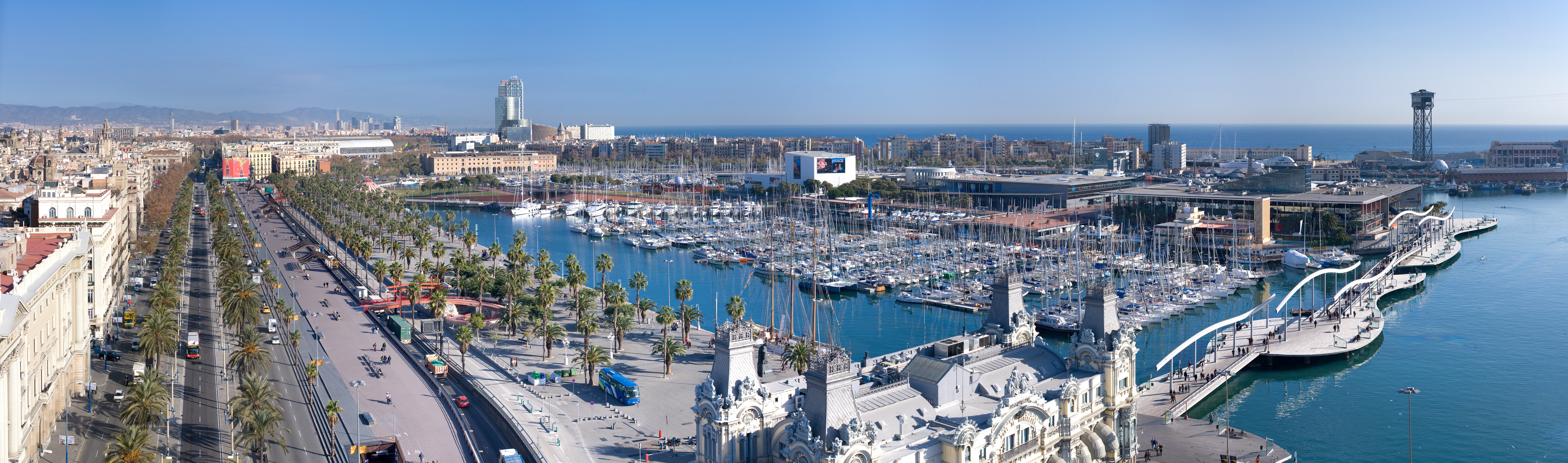
Port Vell in winter

The Barcelona harbour is the leading European cruiser port and a very important Mediterranean turnaround base. In 2013, 3.6 million pleasure cruise passengers used the Port of Barcelona.

The Port Vell area also houses the Maremagnum (a commercial mall), a multiplex cinema, the IMAX Port Vell and one of Europe's largest aquariums – Aquarium Barcelona, containing 8,000 fish and 11 sharks contained in 22 basins filled with 4 million litres of sea water. The Maremagnum, being situated within the confines of the port, is the only commercial mall in the city that can open on Sundays and public holidays.

=== National and international rail ===
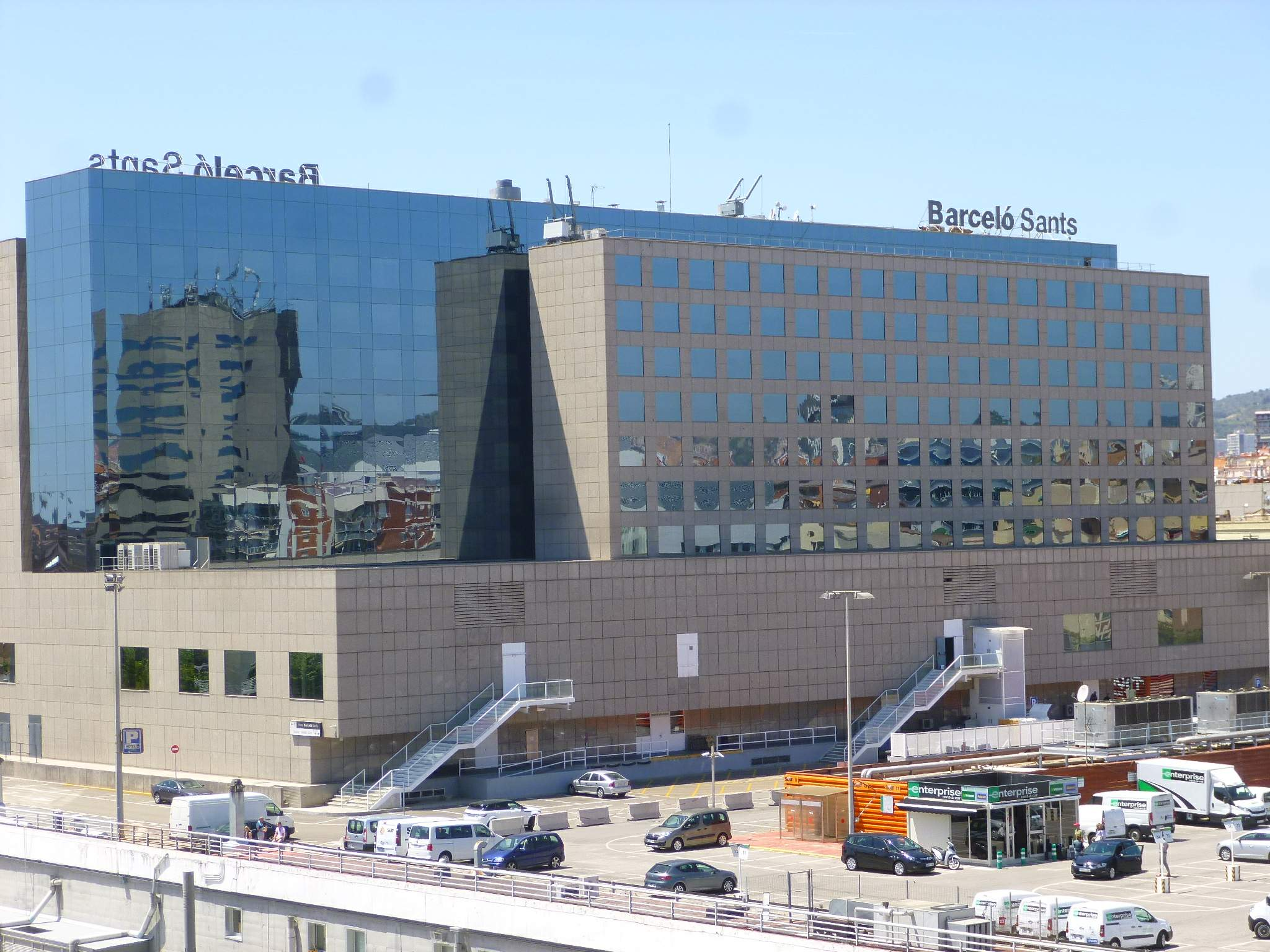
The main railway station Estació de Sants

Barcelona is a major hub for the Spanish rail network. The city's main Inter-city rail station is Barcelona Sants railway station, whilst Estació de França terminus serves a secondary role handling suburban, regional and medium distance services. Freight services operate to local industries and to the Port of Barcelona.

RENFE's AVE high-speed rail system, which is designed for speeds of 310 km/h (193 mph), was extended from Madrid to Barcelona in 2008 in the form of the Madrid–Barcelona high-speed rail line. A shared RENFE-SNCF high-speed rail connecting Barcelona and France (Paris, Marseille and Toulouse, through Perpignan–Barcelona high-speed rail line) was launched in 2013. Both these lines serve Barcelona Sants terminal station.

=== Metro and regional rail ===
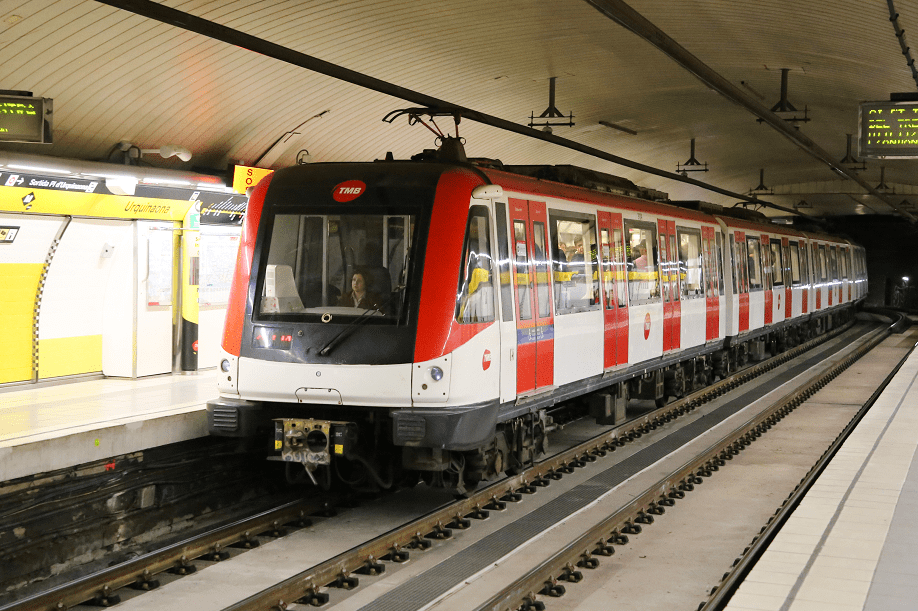
Barcelona Metro

Barcelona is served by an extensive local public transport network that includes a metro system, a bus network, a regional railway system, trams, funiculars, rack railways, a Gondola lift and aerial cable cars. These networks and lines are run by a number of different operators but they are integrated into a coordinated fare system, administered by the Autoritat del Transport Metropolità (ATM). The system is divided into fare zones (1 to 6) and various Integrated Travel Cards are available.

The Barcelona Metro network comprises twelve lines, identified by an "L" followed by the line number as well as by individual colours. The Metro largely runs underground; eight Metro lines are operated on dedicated track by the Transports Metropolitans de Barcelona (TMB), whilst four lines are operated by the Ferrocarrils de la Generalitat de Catalunya (FGC) and some of them share tracks with RENFE commuter lines.

In addition to the city Metro, several regional rail lines operated by Renfe's Rodalies de Catalunya and FGC run across the city, providing connections to outlying towns in the surrounding region.

=== Tram ===
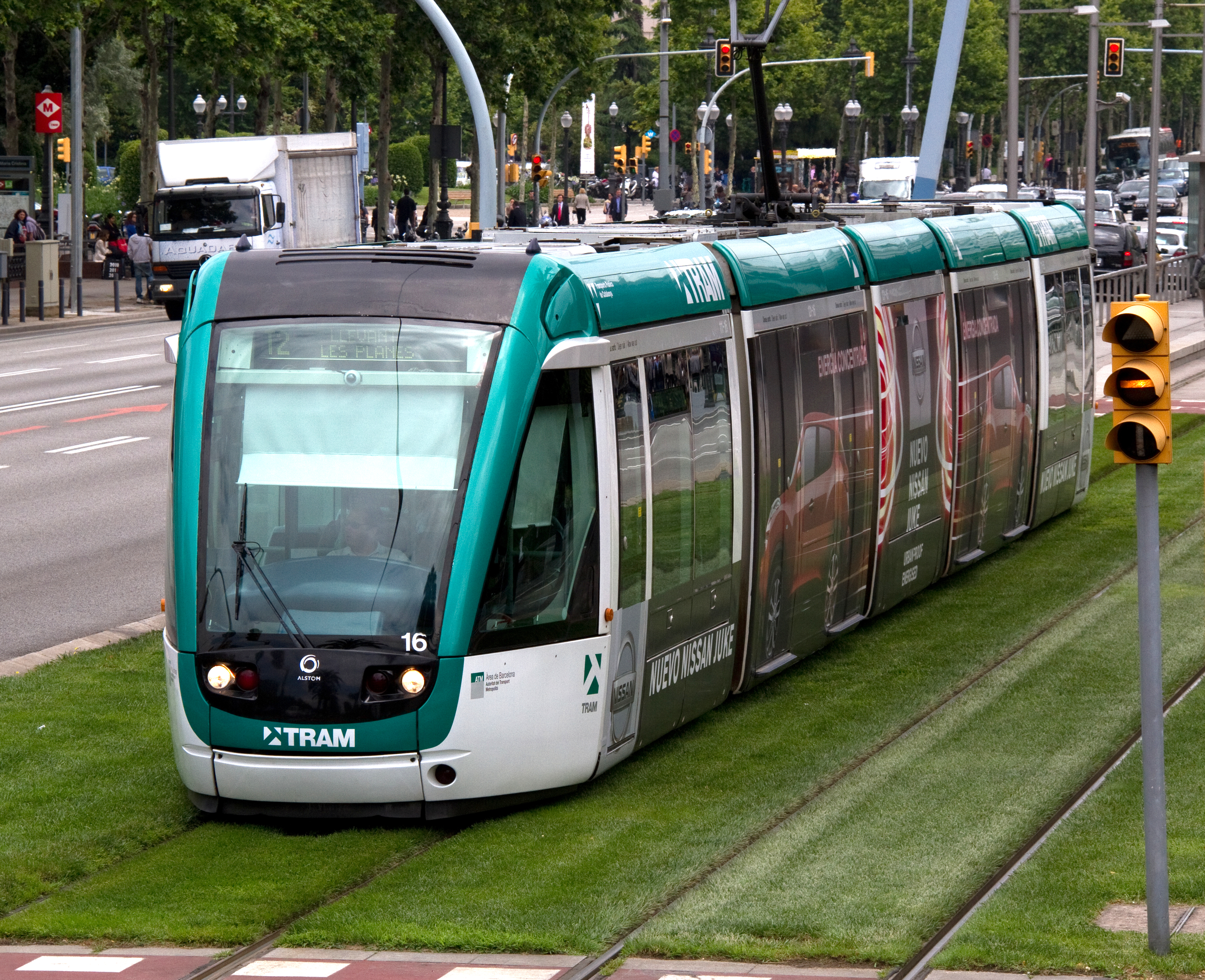
Barcelona Tram at Avinguda Diagonal

The city currently has two modern tram systems, Trambaix and Trambesòs, are operated by TramMet. Both go through the Avinguda Diagonal, one at each end of the avenue, but they do not meet. Since 2020, there is an ongoing project to unify the two systems and allow the tram to connect both ends of the city.

A heritage tram line, the Tramvia Blau, also operated between the metro Line 7 and the Funicular del Tibidabo, but its operation has been indefinitely suspended since 2018.

=== Funicular and cable car ===
Barcelona's metro and rail system is supplemented by several aerial cable cars, funiculars and rack railways that provide connections to mountain-top stations.

FGC operates the Funicular de Tibidabo up the hill of Tibidabo and the Funicular de Vallvidrera, while TMB runs the Funicular de Montjuïc up Montjuïc. The city has two aerial cable cars: the Montjuïc Cable Car, which serves Montjuïc castle, and the Port Vell Aerial Tramway that runs via Torre Jaume I and Torre Sant Sebastià over the port.

=== Bus ===
Buses in Barcelona are a major form of public transport, with extensive local, interurban and night bus networks. Most local services are operated by the TMB, although some other services are operated by a number of private companies, albeit still within the ATM fare structure. There are 21 night lines, 19 of them go through Plaça de Catalunya, where you can change to other lines. The frequency is 15/20 minutes between 22:20 and 06:00. A separate private bus line, known as Aerobús, links the airport with the city centre, with its own fare structure.

The Estació del Nord (Northern Station), a former railway station which was renovated for the 1992 Olympic Games, now serves as the terminus for long-distance and regional bus services.

=== Taxi ===
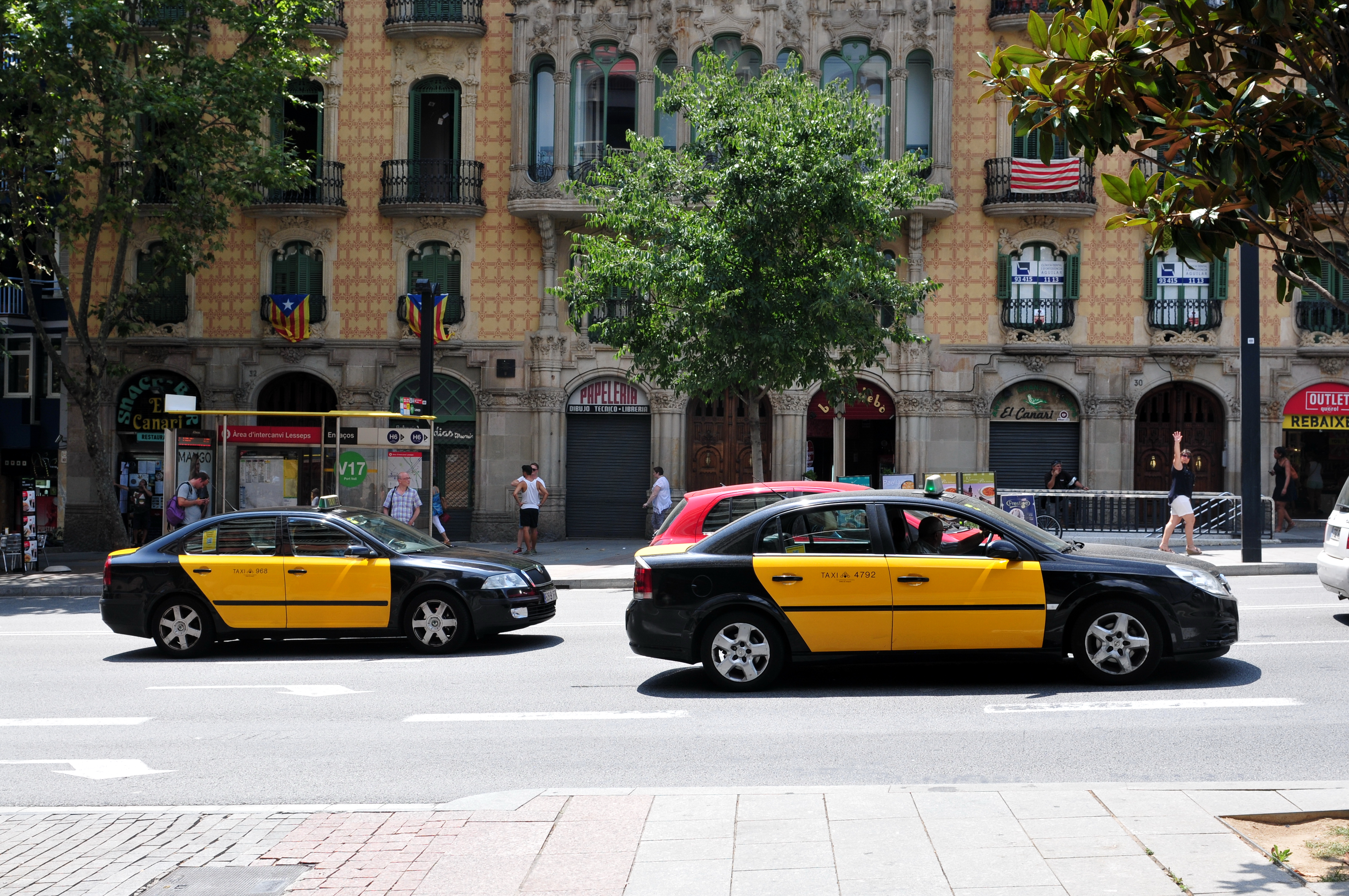
Two typical Barcelona taxis

Barcelona has a metered taxi fleet governed by the Institut Metropolità del Taxi (Metropolitan Taxi Institute), composed of more than 10,000 cars. Most of the licences are in the hands of self-employed drivers. With their black and yellow livery, Barcelona's taxis are easily spotted, and can be caught from one of many taxi ranks, hailed on street, called by telephone or via app.

On 22 March 2007, Barcelona's City Council started the Bicing service, a bicycle service understood as a public transport. Once the user has their user card, they can take a bicycle from any of the more than 400 stations spread around the city and use it anywhere the urban area of the city, and then leave it at another station. The service has been a success, with 50,000 subscribed users in three months.

=== Roads and highways ===
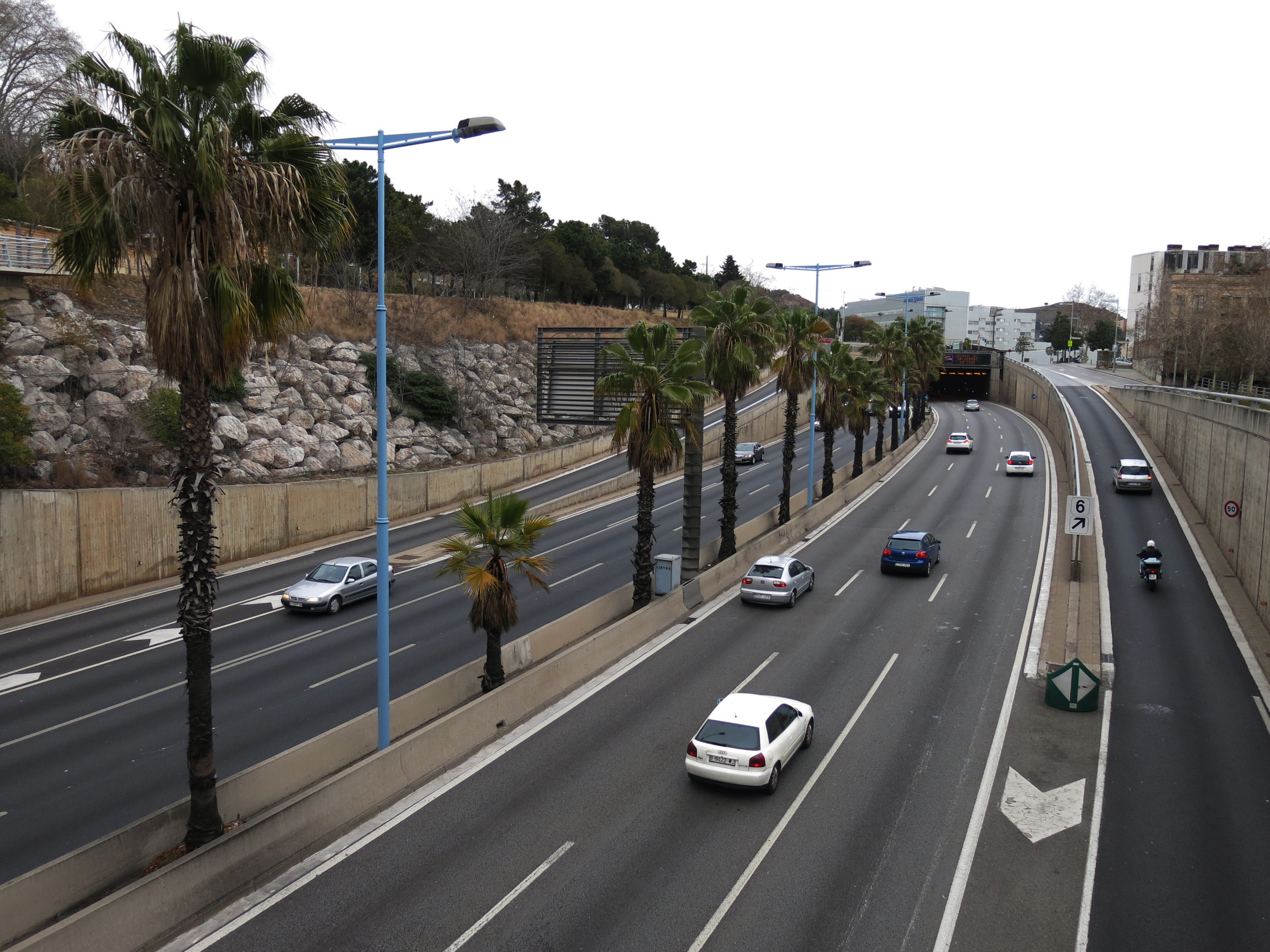
B-20 motorway in Barcelona

Barcelona lies on three international routes, including European route E15 that follows the Mediterranean coast, European route E90 to Madrid and Lisbon, and European route E09 to Paris. It is also served by a comprehensive network of motorways and highways throughout the metropolitan area, including A-2, A-7/AP-7, C-16, C-17, C-31, C-32, C-33, C-60.

The city is circled by three half ring roads or bypasses, Ronda de Dalt (B-20) (on the mountain side), Ronda del Litoral (B-10) (along the coast) and Ronda del Mig (separated into two parts: Travessera de Dalt in the north and the Gran Via de Carles III), two partially covered fast highways with several exits that bypass the city.

The city's main arteries include Diagonal Avenue, which crosses it diagonally, Meridiana Avenue which leads to Glòries and connects with Diagonal Avenue and Gran Via de les Corts Catalanes, which crosses the city from east to west, passing through its centre. The famous boulevard of La Rambla, whilst no longer an important vehicular route, remains an important pedestrian route.

== International relations ==
=== Twin towns – sister cities ===
Barcelona is twinned with:

- Antwerp, Belgium (1997)
- Athens, Greece (1999)
- Boston, United States (1983)
- Busan, South Korea (1983)
- Cologne, Germany (1984)
- (Republic of Ireland) Dublin, Ireland (1998)
- Gaza City, Palestine (1998)
- Havana, Cuba (1993)
- Istanbul, Turkey (1997)
- Kobe, Japan (1993)
- Monterrey, Mexico (1977)
- Montevideo, Uruguay (1985)
- Montpellier, France (1963)
- Rio de Janeiro, Brazil (1972)
- San Francisco, United States (2010)
- São Paulo, Brazil (1985)
- Sarajevo, Bosnia and Herzegovina (2000)
- Shanghai, China (2001)
- Tunis, Tunisia (1969)
- Valparaíso, Chile (2001)

Suspended twin towns / sister cities agreements

- Saint Petersburg, Russia (1985, suspended in 2022)
- Tel Aviv, Israel (1998, suspended in 2023 until Israel agrees to a ceasefire in Gaza)

=== Partnership and friendship ===
Barcelona also cooperates with:

- Amman, Jordan
- Guangzhou, China
- Isfahan, Iran
- Kyoto, Japan
- Lampedusa, Italy
- Lesbos, Greece
- Maputo, Mozambique
- New York City, United States
- Ningbo, China
- Paris, France
- Rosario, Argentina
- Saïda, Algeria
- Seoul, South Korea
- Tétouan, Morocco
- Turin, Italy

== See also ==
- Architecture of Barcelona
- Cerdà Plan
- List of markets in Barcelona
- List of tallest buildings in Barcelona
- Mobile World Congress
- OPENCities
- Outline of Barcelona
- Parks and gardens of Barcelona
- Public art in Barcelona
- Street names in Barcelona
- Urban planning of Barcelona
