= Autopista AP-7 =

Toll highway in Spain

Coordinates: 42°25′28″N 2°51′57″E

Autopista AP-7
- Autopista del Mediterráneo; Autopista de la Mediterrània
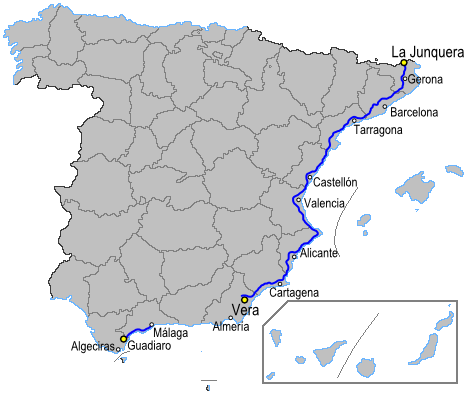

Route information
- Part of
- Length: 1,007 km (626 mi)

Major junctions
- From: La Jonquera
- To: Vera/Algeciras

Location
- Country: Spain

Highway system
- Highways in Spain; Autopistas and autovías; National Roads

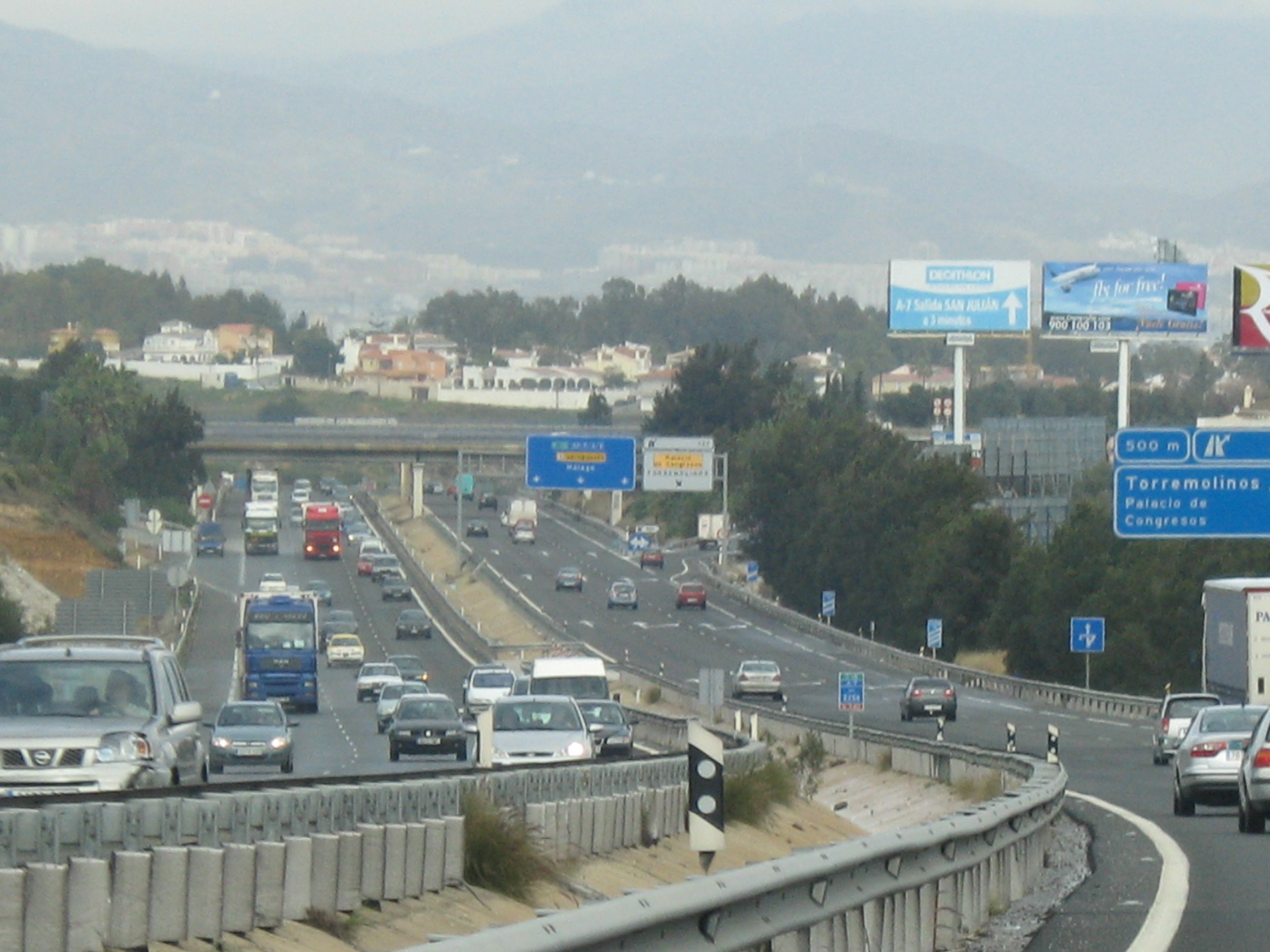
AP-7 in Málaga.

The Autopista AP-7 (also called Autopista del Mediterráneo) (Catalan: Autopista de la Mediterrània) is a Spanish autopista (controlled-access highway). It runs along the Mediterranean coast of Spain, parallel to the Autovía A-7.

AP-7 has two different sections (911+96 km):

- From Els Límits (in La Jonquera municipality) to Vera: 911 km long. Main cities passed:
  - Figueres
  - Girona
  - Sabadell
  - Barcelona
  - Tarragona
  - Reus
  - Salou
  - Amposta
  - Castelló de la Plana
  - Sagunt
  - Valencia
  - Gandia
  - Dénia
  - Benidorm
  - Alacant
  - Elx
  - Cartagena
- From Málaga to Guadiaro: 96 km long. Main cities passed:
  - Torremolinos
  - Benalmádena
  - Fuengirola
  - Marbella
  - Estepona

== Junctions ==
Autopista AP-7 junctions
Southbound exits	Junction	Northbound exits
Entering Spain, Catalonia and Girona Province	Border	End of autopista Road continues as A9 towards Perpignan
Start of autopista	Border	Entering France
La Jonquera N Customs	1	No access (on-slip only)
~~Toll~~
La Jonquera	2 Services	La Jonquera; Customs
Figueres N, Figueres-Vilafant, Roses	3	Figueres N
Figueres S, Roses	4	Figueres S, Figueres-Vilafant, Roses
L'Empordà Services
L'Escala, Empúries	5	L'Escala, Empúries
No access (on-slip only)		Vilademuls, La Jonquera, France N-II
Girona N, Banyoles, Olot, Palamós, Palamós	6	Girona N, Olot, Banyoles
	6A	
Girona O, Girona	6B	Girona O
Girona S, Sant Feliu de Guíxols	7	Girona S, Girona
Fornells de la Selva A-2, Barcelona N-II		No access (on-slip only)
El Gironès Services
Girona–Costa Brava, CIM la Selva, Riudellots de la Selva, Cassà de la Selva, Vic C-25	8	Girona–Costa Brava, CIM la Selva, Riudellots de la Selva, Cassà de la Selva, Vic C-25
Maçanet de la Selva, Lloret de Mar, Blanes, Malgrat de Mar C-35	9	Maçanet de la Selva, Santa Coloma de Farners, Lloret de Mar, Sant Feliu de Guíxols, Palamós, Palamós C-35
La Selva Services
Entering Barcelona Province		Entering Girona Province
Hostalric	10	Hostalric, Blanes
Sant Celoni, Montseny	11	Sant Celoni, Montseny
Montseny Services
Cardedeu, La Roca Village	12A	Cardedeu, La Roca Village
La Roca del Vallès, Granollers E, Mataró C-60	12B	La Roca del Vallès, Granollers E, Mataró C-60
~~Toll~~
Granollers, Montornès del Vallès, Vilanova del Vallès	13	Granollers, Montornès del Vallès, Vilanova del Vallès
Barcelona, Barcelona-El Prat C-33	14; TOTSO	Parets, Vic, Puigcerdà C-17
Mollet del Vallès C-17	15	Mollet del Vallès, Parets, La Llagosta C-17
Mollet del Vallès N	16	Mollet del Vallès N
Caldes de Montbui, CIM Vallès, Mollet del Vallès S C-59	17	Caldes de Montbui, CIM Vallès, Mollet del Vallès S C-59
Santa Perpètua de Mogoda, Polinyà, Industrial area	18; Services	Santa Perpètua de Mogoda, Polinyà, Industrial area
1.000 mi = 1.609 km; 1.000 km = 0.621 mi: Incomplete access; Tolled; Unopened

== See also ==
- N-340 road (Spain)
- Toll road
