= Alella (DO) =

Coordinates: 41°29′43″N 2°17′45″E

Alella DO
- Wine region
- Alella DO in the province of Barcelona in the region of Catalonia
- Official name: Denominació d'Origen Alella
- Type: Denominación de Origen
- Year established: 1953
- Country: Spain
- Sub-regions: Maresme and Vallès counties
- Precipitation (annual average): 600 mm
- Total area: 314 ha
- No. of vineyards: 96
- Grapes produced: 1.4 tn
- No. of wineries: 8
- Wine produced: 9350 hL

Alella DO in Catalonia

Alella is a Spanish Denominación de Origen (DO) (Denominació d'Origen in Catalan) for wines produced in Maresme county in the province of Barcelona in the Spanish autonomous communities of Catalonia, located on the Mediterranean coast, 15 km to the north of the city of Barcelona.

It is one of the smallest DOs in Spain as the vineyards have been encroached upon by urban development. At the present time it only covers one third of the area that it covered in 1956 when it was established, despite a territorial extension in 1989.

== History ==
Wines have been produced in this area since the time of the ancient Romans, and were mentioned by Pliny the Elder in his Naturalis Historia and by Martial in his Epigrams, when they were known as vins laietans. Structures have been found at the archaeological site of Veral de Vallmora, near Teià, showing that wine was made there from the 1st to 4th centuries AD. During the Middle Ages Alella wine was served at the court of the Kings of Aragón.

The region suffered the effects of the phylloxera virus at the end of the 19th century but the vineyards were successfully replanted using phylloxera resistant rootstock from the New World.

In 1906 the wine cooperative, Alella Vinícola, was founded which is renowned for its traditional Marfil brand. The wine cellars were designed by the modernist architect Jeroni Martorell i Terrats.

During the 1920s the region was famous for its cava (sparkling wine).

During the 1980s new varieties were introduced and the wine-making methods modernized. The wineries are urban mansions that are built on the slopes overlooking the sea. The height above sea level of the vineyards determines the variety grown and thus the type of wine produced.

== Geography ==
The vineyards grow on the Serra de Parpers foothills, from the coast up the slopes of the mountains. The Besòs river forms the western boundary. There are two distinct areas within the DO:

- Maresme, on the foothills overlooking the sea, is influenced by the sun and the Mediterranean breezes. The hills protect the vines from the cold winds and condense the humidity caused by the sea. The wines from this area are smooth with low acidity levels.
- Vallès, on the interior slopes facing inland, has a more continental climate. The wines are stronger and more acidic.

The DO covers the following municipalities:

Maresme: Alella, Argentona, Cabrils, El Masnou, Montgat, Òrrius, Premià de Dalt, Premià de Mar, Teià, Tiana, Vilassar de Dalt

Vallès: La Roca del Vallès, Martorelles, Montornès del Vallès, Santa Maria de Martorelles, Sant Fost de Campsentelles, Vallromanes, Vilanova del Vallès

== Climate ==
The oldest vineyards, close to the coast at an altitude of between 60 – 90 m above sea level enjoy a totally Mediterranean climate (mild winters, hot summers), whereas the younger ones, located higher up in cooler areas have a more continental climate.

The average temperature is about 15 °C (max 35 °C in summer, min −3 °C in winter) and there is a risk of frost during the winter and spring months especially at the higher altitudes. Rainfall is sparse to average falling mainly at the end of summer and autumn in the form of violent storms. Average of 600 mm per year.

== Soils ==
The lowest vineyards, at 60 m above sea level, are on dark soils over igneous rocks in an open valley overlooking the sea. The highest ones, in a new district known as Vallés, are on lime bearing rock sheltered by the mountains.

The most interesting feature of Allella DO is the distinctive topsoil which is known as sauló in Catalan. It is basically a white granite-based sand which is very porous and retains heat very well. This helps the grapes to ripen, while the low water retention properties are compensated by the local humid microclimate.

== Grape varieties ==
White:

- Recommended: Garnacha blanca and Xarel·lo (Pansa blanca)
- Also authorized: Chardonnay, Chenin, Macabeo, Malvasia, Moscatell de Gra Petit, Parellada, Picapoll Blanc, and Sauvignon blanc

Red:

- Recommended: Garnacha Negra
- Also authorized: Cabernet sauvignon, Garnatxa Peluda, Merlot, Monastrell (Morastrell), Pinot noir, Samsó, Mazuela, Sumoll negre, Syrah and Ull de llebre (Tempranillo)

The older vines grow freely while the newer vineyards have been planted on trellises. Planting density is between 2,000 and 3,500 vines per hectare.

== See also ==
- Catalan wine
