= Roca Centella =

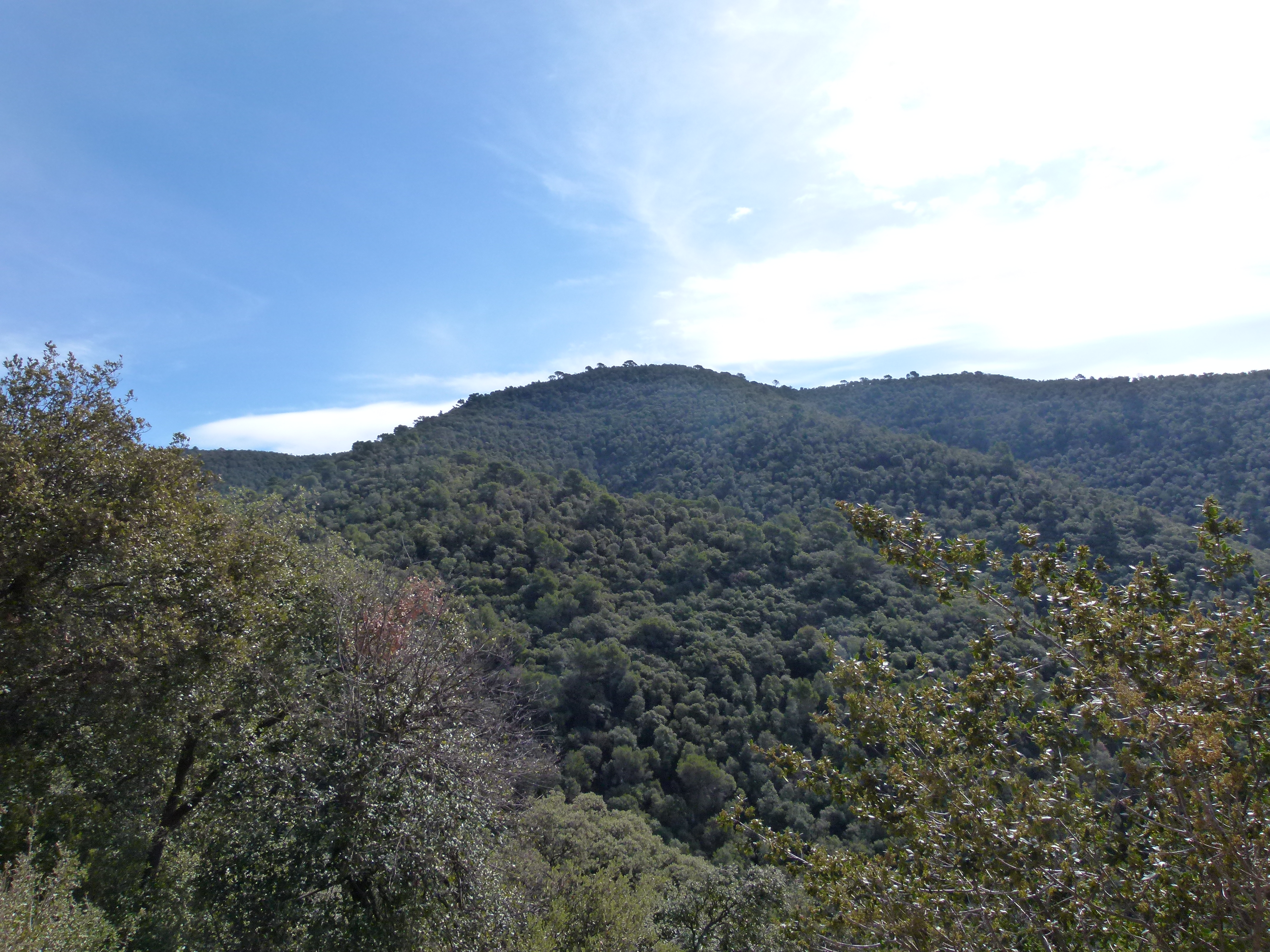

Highest point
- Elevation: 1,000 m (3,300 ft)
- Coordinates: 41°43′11″N 2°19′20″E

Geography
- Location within Catalonia
- Location: Vallès Oriental, Catalonia

Climbing
- First ascent: Unknown
- Easiest route: From Cànoves i Samalús, Figaró-Montmany or Tagamanent

Roca Centella is a mountain of Catalonia, Spain. It has an elevation of 1,000 metres above sea level. This mountain is part of the Catalan Pre-Coastal Range.

The name of the mountain means "Lightning Rock" in the Catalan language.

== See also ==
- Catalan Pre-Coastal Range
- Mountains of Catalonia
