= Andreu Rabasa Negre =

Spanish businessperson (1931–2022)

- Born: April 5, 1931; Mollet del Vallès, Barcelona
- Died: October 17, 2022 (aged 91); Barcelona
- Occupation: businessman

Andreu Rabasa Negre (April 5, 1931 – October 17, 2022) was a Spanish motorcycle businessman and president of Derbi from 1988 to 2000.

== Biography ==
Negre was born in Mollet del Vallès, in the Vallès Oriental region of Catalonia, Spain. He was the eldest son of Shimeo Rabasa. After studying engineering at the Barcelona Industrial School, and business management at the IESE Business School, in 1976 he joined the family business, the Rabasa-Derbi moped and motorcycle factory in Martorelles. Negre was the president from 1988 to 2000. Later, when the crisis of 1973 arrived, Negre abandoned the large budget allocations that racing involved, to maintain economic stability and safeguard the company.

In 1984, Andreu helped Derbi returned to the Motorcycle World Championship with Jorge Martínez who managed to become 80 cc world champion three times (1986, 1987 and 1988) and once in 125 cc (1988).
