= Lliçà =

Lliçà may refer to two municipalities in Catalonia, Spain in the province of Barcelona in the comarca of Vallès Oriental:

- Lliçà d'Amunt
- Lliçà de Vall

== See also ==
- Llica, small town in Bolivia
