= Sant Feliu de Codines =

- Municipality
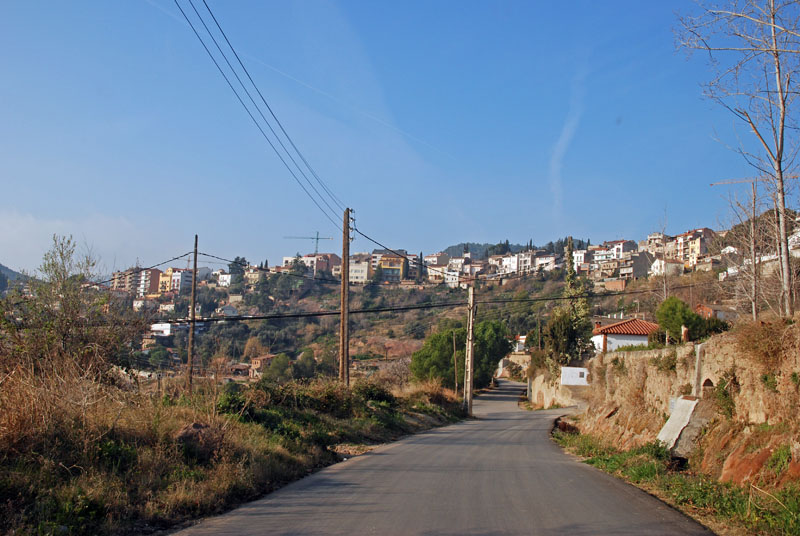

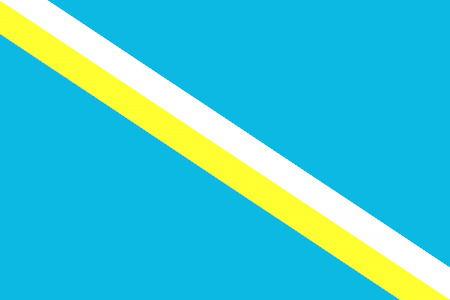
- Flag Coat of arms

- Location in Catalonia Sant Feliu de Codines (Spain)
- Coordinates: 41°41′25″N 2°9′54″E
- Country: Spain
- Community: Catalonia
- Province: Barcelona
- Comarca: Vallès Oriental

Government
  - Mayor: Pere Pladevall Vallcorba (2019)

Area
  - Total: 15.0 km^{2} (5.8 sq mi)
- Elevation: 480 m (1,570 ft)

Population (2025-01-01)
  - Total: 6,827
  - Density: 455/km^{2} (1,180/sq mi)
- Demonym(s): Codinenc, codinenca
- Website: santfeliudecodines.cat

Sant Feliu de Codines (Catalan pronunciation: [ˈsaɱ fəˈliw ðə kuˈðinəs]) is a municipality in the comarca of Vallès Oriental, Catalonia, Spain. It is located in the north-west corner of the comarca, on the border with comarca of Moianès to the north, and the comarca of Vallès Occidental to the west.

== History ==
The name of Sant Feliu first appears in 1059, when the nobleman Mir Geribert and his wife Guisla were named Barons of Montbui by the Count of Barcelona Ramon Berenguer I the Old. These were the first feudal lords, who occupied a barony that extended the length and breadth of an extensive region which includes the present-day municipalities of Sant Feliu, Bigues i Riells, l'Ametlla del Vallès and Santa Eulàlia de Ronçana.

Over the centuries, Sant Feliu became the most prominent part of the barony, when measured both in number of inhabitants and in artisanal production. This caused the inhabitants of Sant Feliu to consider independence from the barony of Montbui. After many petitions, and taking advantage of a favourable political situation, in 1793 King Charles IV granted the parish of Sant Feliu de Codines the title of Vila, effective December 8, 1799.

The population grew around the parish church, where the Sagrera neighbourhood was formed (meaning "sacred land"). Currently, this area still retains narrow alleys and some buildings typical of past centuries. Slowly the town grew and other important neighbourhoods of the town center were formed, such as the Serrat de Vic and the Venderia or Revenderia.

Over time an intense rivalry was created between the two neighbourhoods, to the point that the Venderia, in 1796, built its own bell tower. Since this time, the rivalry between the two neighbourhoods disappeared, and other neighbourhoods and residential areas were also formed until the current village of Sant Feliu de Codines was formed.

The almost exclusive dry climate that Sant Feliu enjoys, its natural environment and the proximity to large cities are the main factors that converted it into a new bedroom community by the late nineteenth century.

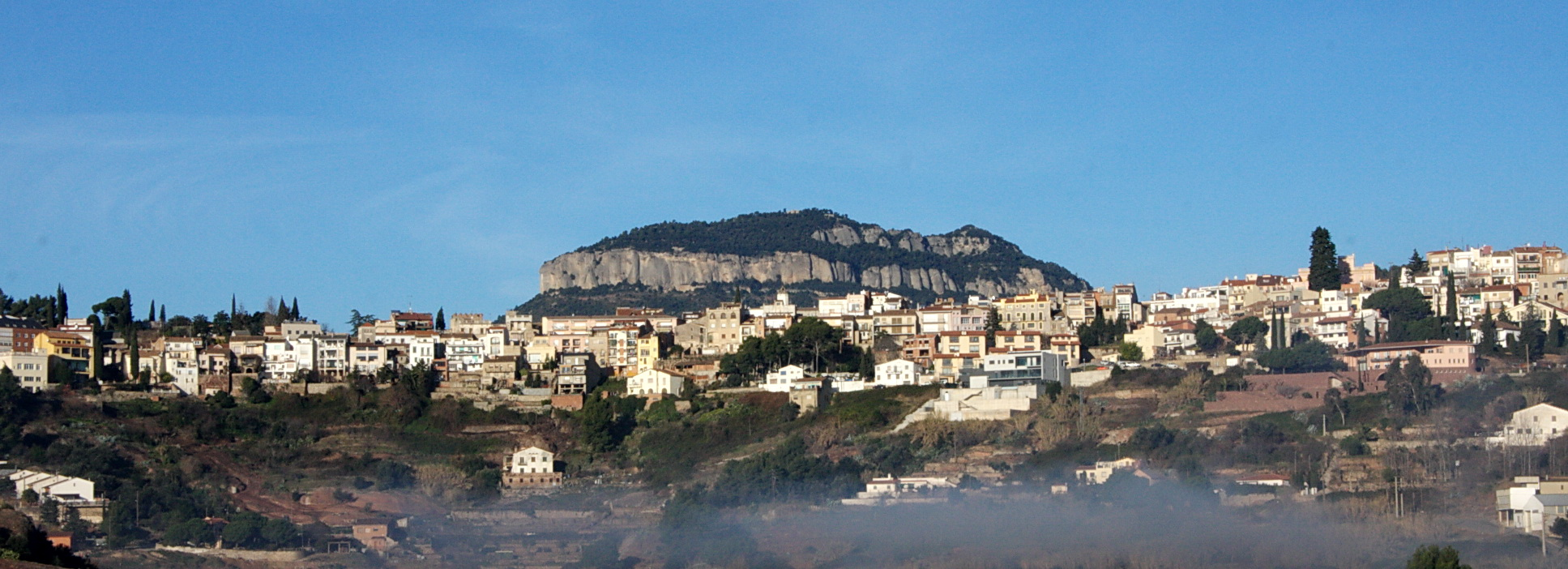
Sant Feliu de Codines

== Illustrious people ==
An illustrious character who visited the town was Antoni Gaudí. In Sant Feliu, he left his mark on the design of the banner of the local Orfeó Feliuà, which is on display at the Can Xifreda Municipal Museum. Dr. Bartomeu Robert also enjoyed the good climate of Sant Feliu, to the point that he commented that Sant Feliu was the best town in Vallès and recommended to many of his patients to spend long periods to cure their illnesses.

Among other illustrious visitors we must also highlight the passage of the philologist Pompeu Fabra. He spent the summer in Can Viladomat, from where he went into exile on January 24, 1939, due to the Spanish Civil War. In 2016, these events were commemorated by placing a plaque in the house of Can Viladomat, on Agustí Santacruz Street, and with a lecture by the linguist Jordi Mir.

We must also highlight the passage of politicians Manuel Carrasco i Formiguera (whose name was bestowed on the secondary school of the municipality), Francesc Cambó, and the theologian and philosopher Jaume Balmes (whose name was bestowed on the primary school). Balmes who notably wrote El Criterio in the nearby masia of Prat de Dalt, in Caldes de Montbui.

== Demography ==
1900	1930	1950	1970	1986	2018
2450	2445	2357	2998	3360	6184

== Entities ==
- ADF El Pinyó
- Agrupació Sardanista de Sant Feliu de Codines
- Agrupament Escolta Makalu
- Amics del Ball
- Amics del Museu de Sant Feliu de Codines
- Anandaya
- Assemblea Territori SFIndependència
- Asociación Alianza La Paz
- Associació Contra el Càncer - Junta Local
- Associació Cultural i Gastronòmica Sense Estovalles
- Associació Cultural No m'Atabalis
- Associació d'arts i oficis Sant Feliu
- Associació d'empresaris de Sant Feliu de Codines
- Associació de Consum el Cogombre a l'ombra
- Associació de Defensa pels Animals
- Associació de Jubilats i Pensionistes de Sant Feliu de Codines
- Associació de Música i Arts de Sant Feliu de Codines
- Associació de Sevillanes de Sant Feliu
- Associació de Veïns Racó del Bosc
- Associació de Veïns Carrer de Montbui
- Associació Fira del Rellotge
- Associació Gastronòmica Els Poca Gana
- Associació Guifinet
- Associació Mans Unides
- Associació Sant Feliu en Sac
- Associació Vincles, espai de criança
- Atthenew SFC
- Càritas
- Casal Cultural Codinenc
- Centre Excursionista de Sant Feliu de Codines
- Club Atlètic Atlètic Sant Feliu
- Club Billar Sant Feliu
- Club de Bàsquet Sant Feliu
- Club de Petanca La Fonteta de Sant Feliu
- Club de Tennis Sant Feliu
- Club Escacs - El Peó Codinenc
- Club Esportiu Racó del Bosc
- Club Futbol Sant Feliu
- Club Hoquei Sant Feliu
- Club Tennis Taula
- Colla Boines Negres
- Comunitat Makinera Sant Feliu
- Country
- Creu Roja
- El magatzem solidari
- Esbart Codinenc
- Escuderia Vall del Tenes-Sant Feliu
- Fundació patronat Agustí Santacruz
- Geganters de Sant Feliu
- Gremi de Sant Antoni Abat
- Grup de Comerciants Codinencs
- Grup de teatre Blaugrana Scena
- Grup de teatre Deixalles 81
- Grup del Correfoc del Follet i la Fantasma
- KulActiu, entitat juvenil de Sant Feliu
- La Caldera, associació de músics de Sant Feliu
- Moto Club Cingles de Bertí
- Mots pel Vint-i-u
- Ona Codinenca, la ràdio municipal
- Òmnium Cultural Vallès Nord - Cingles de Bertí (Vallès Oriental)
- Penya barcelonista "Els Blaugrana"
- Rotary Club Cingles de Bertí
- Secció Ciclista del Club d'Hoquei Sant Feliu
- Secció de Patinatge del Club d'Hoquei
- Sents Veus
- Societat Coral La Poncella
- Societat de Caçadors
- Voluntaris forestals SFC
