= Julio Murillo =

Julio Murillo (born 1957) is a Spanish writer. Born in São Paulo, Brazil to Spanish parents, he moved to Spain as he was four years old. He has worked variously as a journalist, publicist, radio producer, marketing manager and creative consultant. He is best known as a historical novelist, and his six novels in this genre (starting with Las lágrimas de Karseb) have all been well-received. He won the Premio de Novela Histórica Alfonso X El Sabio in 2008 for his novel Shangri-la: La cruz bajo la Antártida.

He currently lives in Santa María de Palautordera.

== Bibliography ==
- Las Lágrimas de Karseb (2005)
- Las Puertas del Paraíso (2006)
- El Agua y la Tierra (2007)
- Shangri-la: La cruz bajo la Antártida (2008)
- Oricalco: La luz de la Atlántida (2010)
- El club de los filósofos asesinos (2012)

== Awards ==
- 2005 – Nominated for the Premio de Novela Histórica Alfonso X El Sabio for Las lágrimas de Karseb: Constantinopla 1453
- 2008 – Winner of Premio de Novela Histórica Alfonso X El Sabio for Shangri-la. La cruz bajo la Antártida
- 2008 – Nominated for the IV Edición del Premio Novela Histórica Ciudad de Zaragoza for El agua y la tierra
