= Campins =

Campins can refer to:

- Campins, Barcelona, Catalonia, Spain
- 3327 Campins, main belt asteroid
