= Vallromanes =

- Municipality
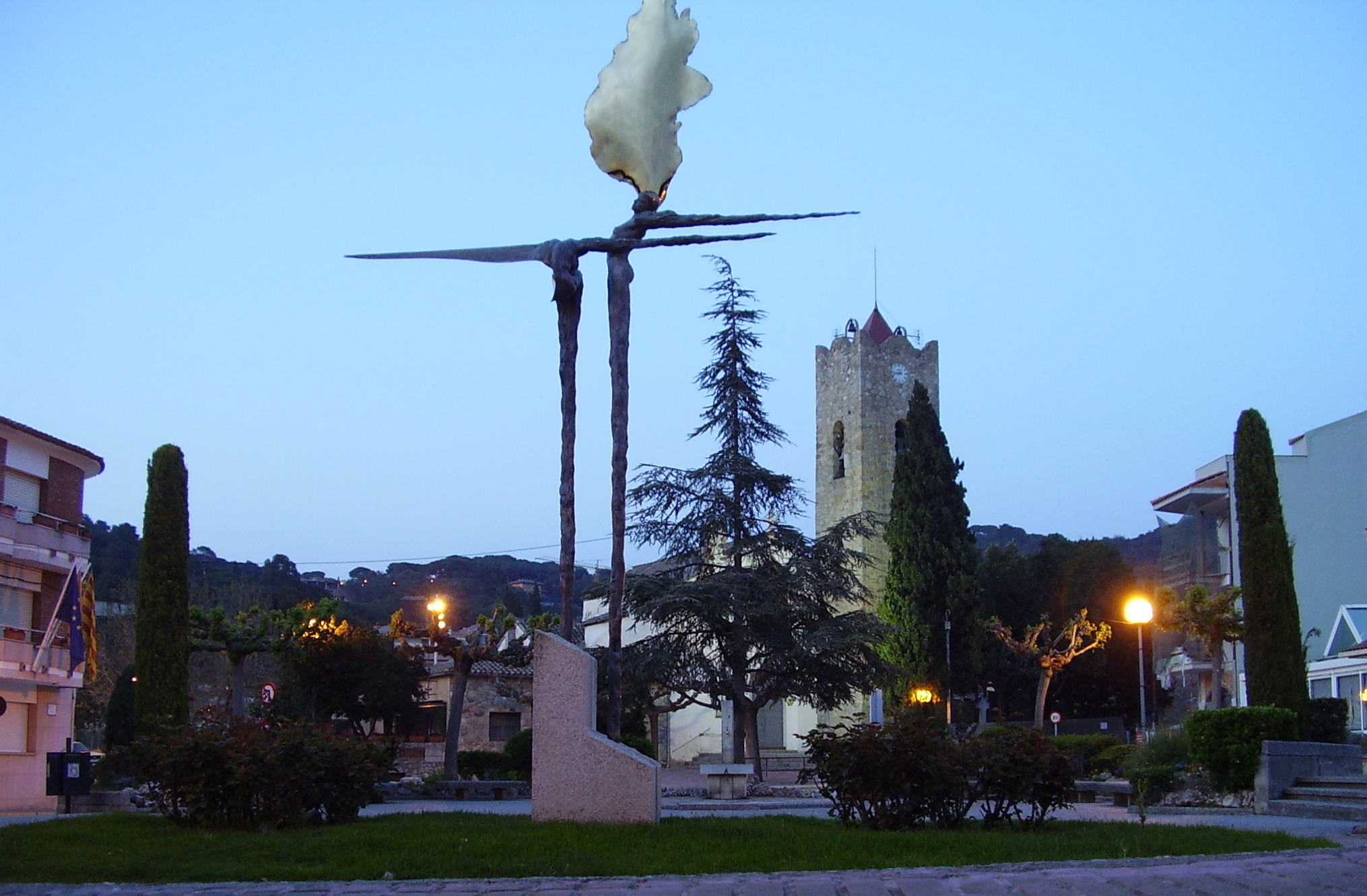
- Church Square

- Flag Coat of arms

- Location in Catalonia Vallromanes (Spain)
- Coordinates: 41°32′2″N 2°18′8″E
- Country: Spain
- Community: Catalonia
- Province: Barcelona
- Comarca: Vallès Oriental

Government
  - Mayor: Jordi Pereda Mañé (2023)

Area
  - Total: 10.7 km^{2} (4.1 sq mi)

Population (2025-01-01)
  - Total: 2,778
  - Density: 260/km^{2} (672/sq mi)
- Website: www.vallromanes.cat

Vallromanes (Catalan pronunciation: [ˌbaʎruˈmanəs]) is a village in the Vallès Oriental, bordering Maresme, and approximately 25 km from Barcelona in Catalunya, Spain. It forms part of the Barcelona metropolitan area and extends along the northeastern slopes of the Sant Mateu range in the Cordillera Litoral; the end of which is home to the Vallromanes riverbed, which flows from Mogent towards Montornès del Vallès. The village is mountainous, largely covered in shrubs, as well as pine and oak forests. There are several gated communities in the area around the Vallromanes Golf Club and nearby.

== Access ==
The road which allows access to Vallromanes is BP-5002, which connects it to the towns of Granollers and El Masnou. Vallromanes is almost exactly in the middle of the two towns. Along the BP-5002, the closest towns are Vilanova del Vallès (in the direction of Granollers) and Alella (in the direction of El Masnou and the Mediterranean Sea), a town known for its wine production.
