= Vilalba Sasserra =

- Municipality
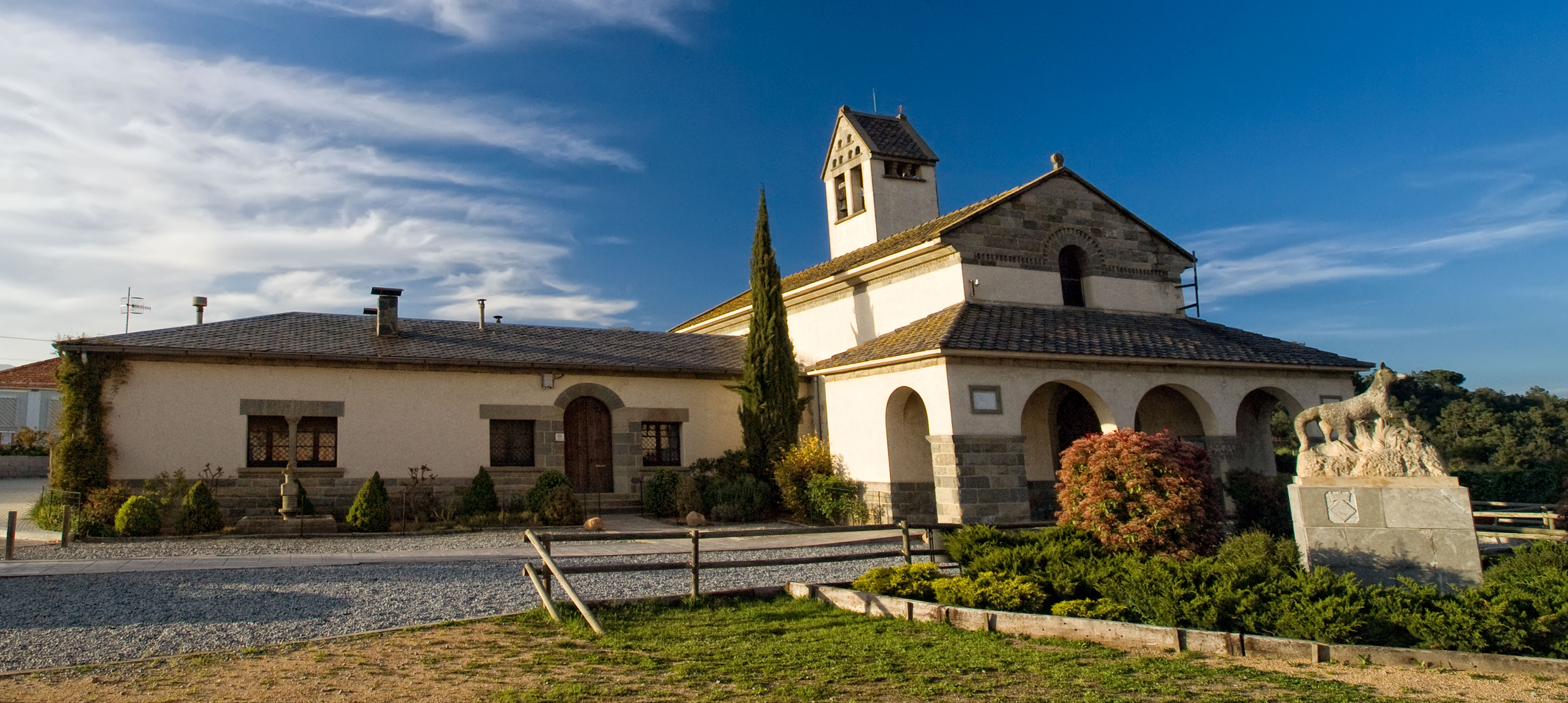
- Church of Santa Maria in Vilalba Sasserra

- Coat of arms

- Location in Catalonia Vilalba Sasserra (Spain)
- Coordinates: 41°39′14″N 2°26′32″E
- Country: Spain
- Community: Catalonia
- Province: Barcelona
- Comarca: Vallès Oriental

Government
  - Mayor: Joan Pons Fiori (2015)

Area
  - Total: 6.0 km^{2} (2.3 sq mi)

Population (2025-01-01)
  - Total: 794
  - Density: 130/km^{2} (340/sq mi)
- Website: vilalbasasserra.cat

Vilalba Sasserra (Catalan pronunciation: [biˈlalβə səˈsɛrə]) is a village in the comarca of Vallès Oriental in the province of Barcelona and autonomous community of Catalonia, Spain. The municipality covers an area of 6 square kilometres (2.3 sq mi) and the population in 2014 was 706.
