= Sant Esteve de Palautordera =

- Municipality
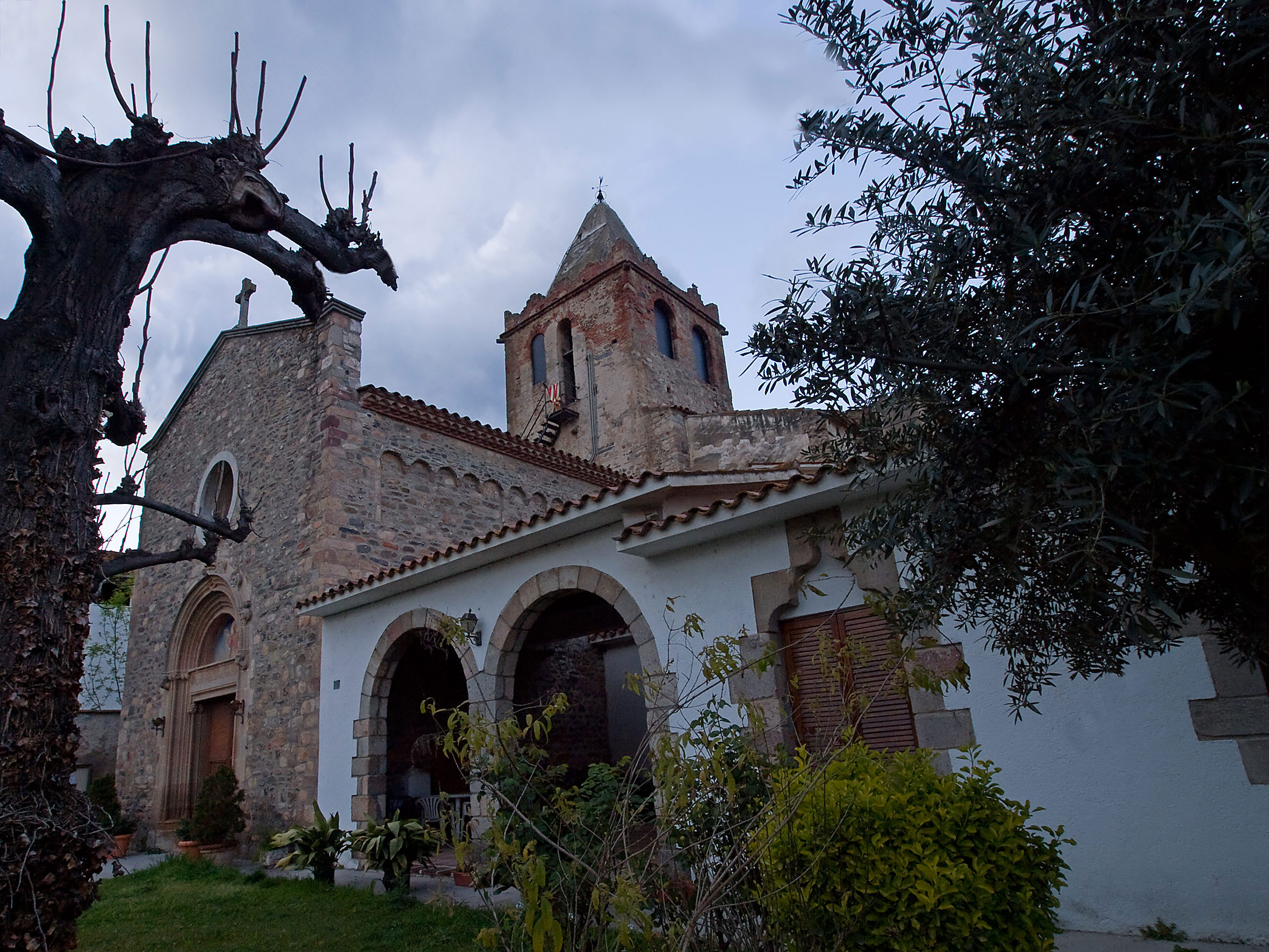
- Parish church of Sant Esteve de Palautordera

- Coat of arms

- Location in Catalonia Sant Esteve de Palautordera (Spain)
- Coordinates: 41°42′19″N 2°26′09″E
- Country: Spain
- Community: Catalonia
- Province: Barcelona
- Comarca: Vallès Oriental

Government
  - Mayor: Daniel Fernández Fuster (2015)

Area
  - Total: 10.6 km^{2} (4.1 sq mi)
- Elevation: 231 m (758 ft)

Population (2025-01-01)
  - Total: 3,099
  - Density: 292/km^{2} (757/sq mi)
- Demonym(s): Santestevenc, santestevenca
- Website: santestevedepalautordera.cat

Sant Esteve de Palautordera (Catalan pronunciation: [ˈsant əsˈteβə ðə pəˌlawtuɾˈðeɾə]) is a municipality in the comarca of the Vallès Oriental in Catalonia, Spain. It forms part of the sub-comarca of Baix Montseny.

== Demography ==
1900	1930	1950	1970	1986	2006
667	789	807	888	n/a	2,079
