= Campins, Spain =

Campins
- Municipality
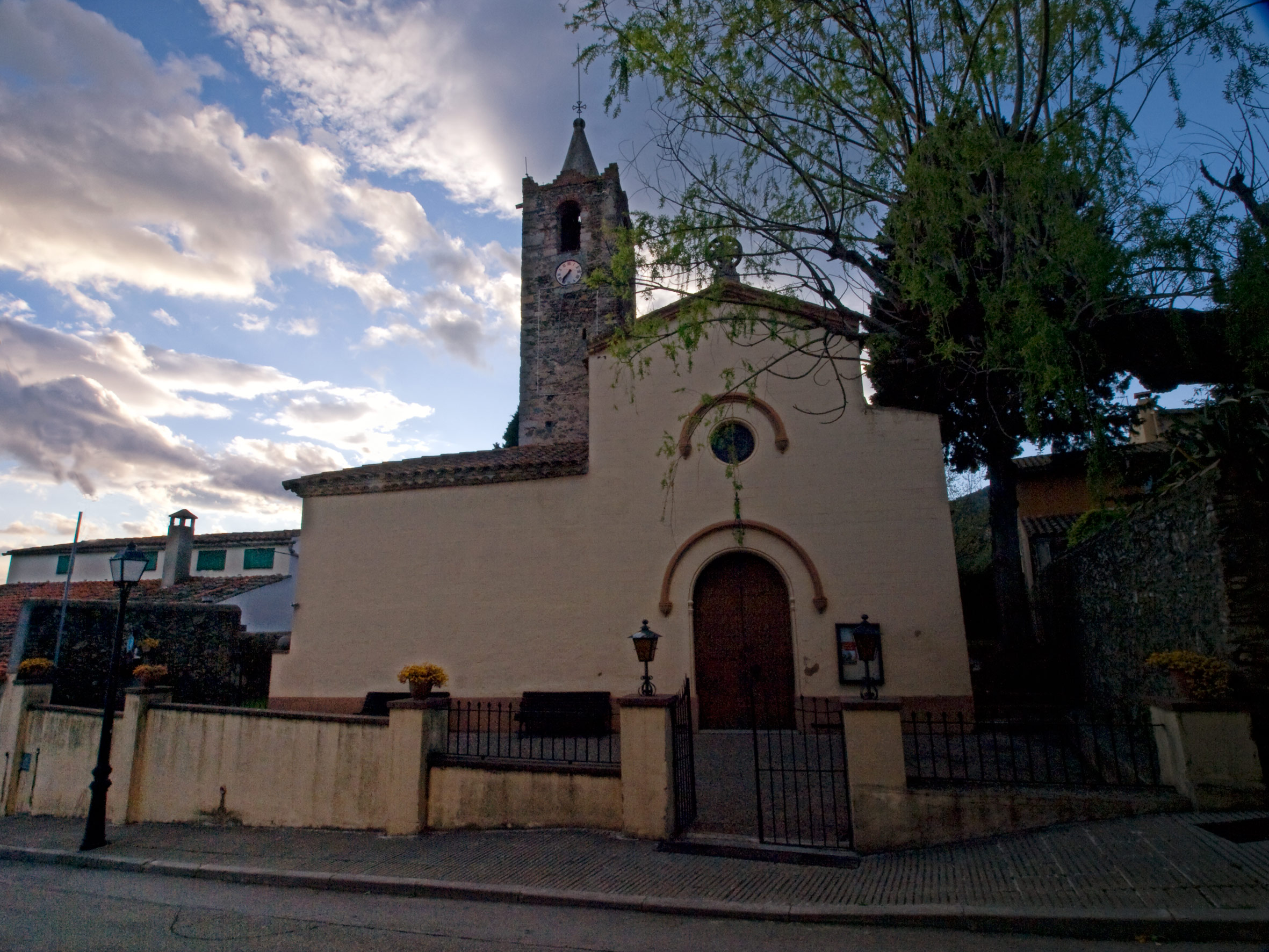
- Saint John's church in Campins

- Coat of arms

- Location in Catalonia Campins (Spain)
- Coordinates: 41°43′N 2°28′E
- Country: Spain
- Community: Catalonia
- Province: Barcelona
- Comarca: Vallès Oriental

Government
  - Mayor: Joan Lacruz Gil (2015)

Area
  - Total: 7.3 km^{2} (2.8 sq mi)

Population (2025-01-01)
  - Total: 586
  - Density: 80/km^{2} (210/sq mi)
- Website: campins.cat

Campins (Catalan pronunciation: [kəmˈpins]) is a municipality in the Vallès Oriental comarca, in Catalonia (North east of Spain). It is part of the subregion of Lower Montseny.

== Demography ==
Historical population

Year	Pop.	±%
1497	14	—
1515	25	+78.6%
1553	24	−4.0%
1717	67	+179.2%
1787	97	+44.8%
1857	362	+273.2%
1877	351	−3.0%
1887	343	−2.3%
1900	293	−14.6%
1910	300	+2.4%
1920	298	−0.7%
1930	262	−12.1%
1940	279	+6.5%
1950	252	−9.7%

Year	Pop.	±%
1960	196	−22.2%
1970	174	−11.2%
1981	160	−8.0%
1990	195	+21.9%
1992	199	+2.1%
1994	218	+9.5%
1996	242	+11.0%
1998	262	+8.3%
2000	292	+11.5%
2002	305	+4.5%
2004	334	+9.5%
2006	363	+8.7%
2011	507	+39.7%
