= Canovelles =

- Municipality
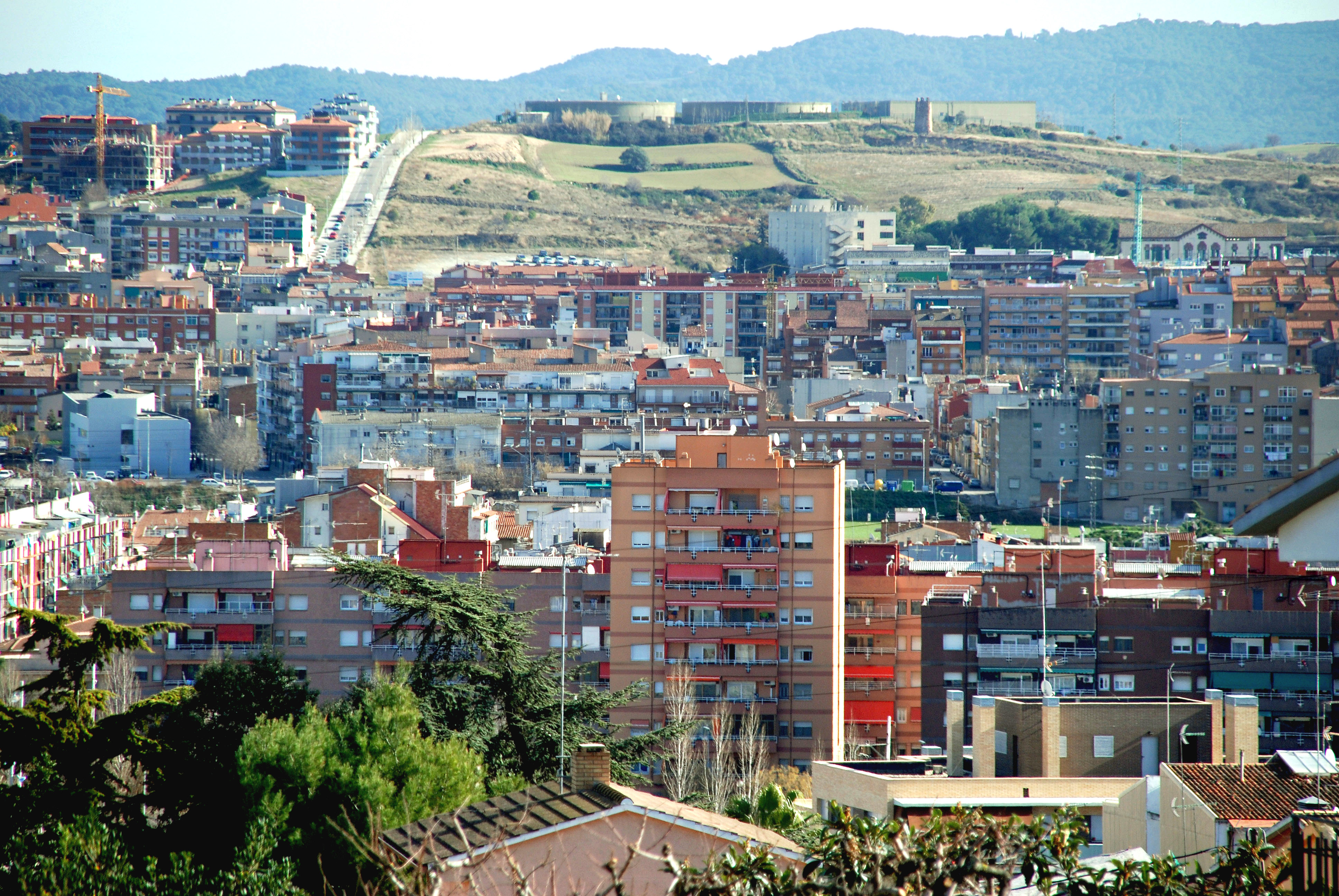
- Buildings seen from the street of Sant Eudald of Canovelles

- Flag Coat of arms

- Location in Catalonia
- Coordinates: 41°37′13″N 2°17′5″E
- Country: Spain
- Autonomous community: Catalonia
- Province: Barcelona
- Comarca: Vallès Oriental

Government
  - Mayor: Emilio Cordero Soria (2016)

Area
  - Total: 6.7 km^{2} (2.6 sq mi)
- Elevation: 175 m (574 ft)

Population (2025-01-01)
  - Total: 17,473
  - Density: 2,600/km^{2} (6,800/sq mi)
  - Demonym: Canovellí canovellina
- Postal code: 08420
- Website: www.canovelles.cat

Canovelles (Catalan pronunciation: [kənuˈβeʎəs]) is a municipality situated in the comarca of Vallès Oriental, in the province of Barcelona, part of the autonomous community of Catalonia in northeastern Spain. It is located about 2 km (1.2 mi) from the local capital of Granollers, with which it forms a conurbation.

== Demographics ==
=== Population by district ===
District	Pop. (2007)
Àligues, les	125
La Barriada Nova	11,786
Bellulla	225
Can Castells	696
Can Comas	17
Can Diviu	1,327
Can Duran	668
Can Quana	58
La Quinta Avinguda	111
La Serra	31
Sanaüja	486
Sant Feliu	45
Tibel	149

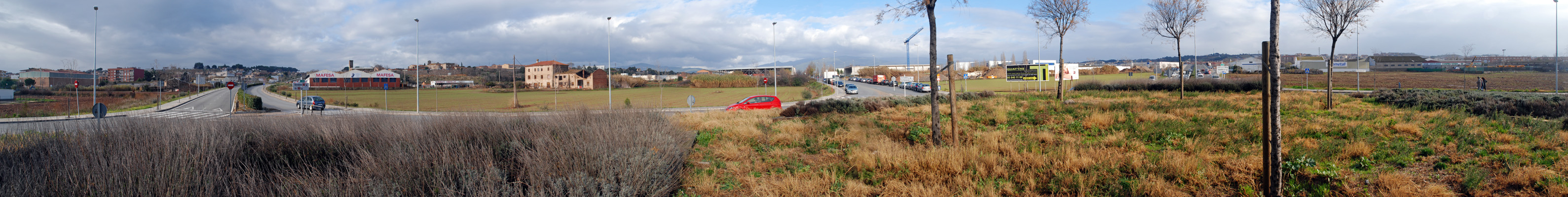
Ronda Nord in Canovelles

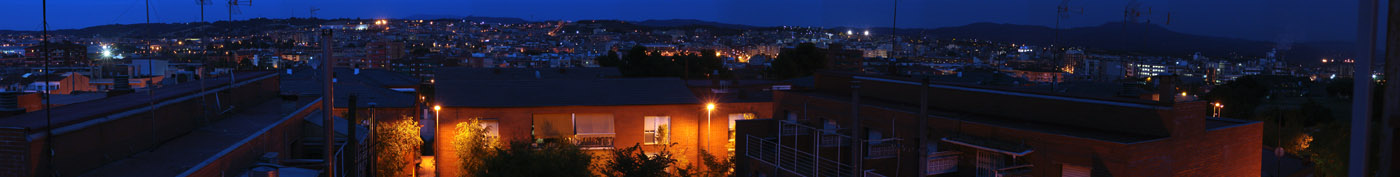
The neighborhood of Can Diviu

== Population distribution ==
The vast majority of the immigrants of the last decade and their descendants live in the Barriada Nova (New Quarters). However, the members of the immigrant wave in the 1960s and 1970s are gradually moving further into the peripheral districts. Public housing shortages and the high price of private housing are driving young people out of the area, and into municipalities in the same region.

=== Demographic evolution ===
1497	1515	1553	1717	1787	1857	1877	1887	1900
18	24	23	136	173	303	305	334	335

1910	1920	1930	1940	1950	1960	1970	1981	1990
330	337	505	665	631	3,061	8,100	12,093	13,165

1992	1994	1996	1998	2000	2002	2004	2006	2007
13,324	13,603	13,287	13,106	13,016	13,375	14,001	15,012	15,704

== Economy ==
During the 1950s and 1960s, Canovelles saw a dramatic increase and immigration from other parts of Spain – namely from the nearby region of Barcelona. Because of this explosion in population, much of Canovelles' economy stems from the service sector.

Another major source of regional economy comes from the weekly market held every Sunday, comprised by more than 500 shops. This market focus on the distribution of clothing, electronic devices and fruit.

== History ==
Numerous archeological finds from the Neolithic Period and the Roman Empire have been found in Canovelles. One representative is the “Menhir”, a replica of which is displayed at the Can Palots Theater exhibition hall.

The first time the term Canovelles appears in a document is in 1008 AD, in a document pertaining to the Abbot of Sant Cugat.

Between the 1950s and the 1970s, many families from Extremadura and Andalusia arrived to the municipality, increasing the population by a factor of twenty. Since the end of the 1990s people from Morocco, Sub-Saharan Africa, and Latin America have been arriving to Canovelles in great numbers.

During the 1970s, clandestine groups of Marxists organized against the Franquist dictatorship, some of them comprised by more than a hundred militants.

=== Recent history ===
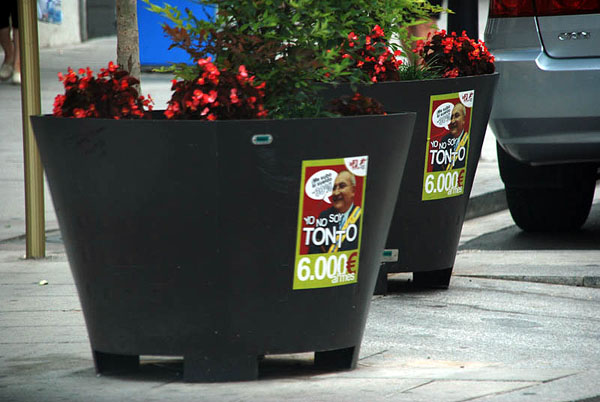
Controversial stickers spread around the town criticized the mayor's increase in pay

A celebration was held in 2008 to celebrate the oldest document (written in 1008) in which a writer mentions the municipality's name.

In 2007, Socialists' Party of Catalonia (PSC) gained an absolute majority in the municipal government under the leadership of José Orive. In 2008, this government approved a thirty percent increase in pay for the mayor and local councillors. This pay increase marked José Orive as an object of controversy when hundreds of stickers criticizing the decision were posted on lampposts and other public objects throughout the municipality. After these stickers had been up for two days, the municipal government paid a cleaning company to remove them. Orive left his position as the Mayor of Canovelles for personal reasons. Emilio Cordero succeeded Orive as the Mayor of Canovelles in 2016.

== Administration ==
=== List of mayors since the democratic elections of 1979 ===
Term	Name of mayor	Political Party
1979–1983	Francesc Martos i Aguilera	PSC
1983–1987	Francesc Martos i Aguilera	PSC
1987–1991	Francesc Martos i Aguilera	PSC
1991–1995	Francesc Martos i Aguilera	PSC
1995–1999	Francesc Martos i Aguilera	PSC
1999–2003	Francesc Martos i Aguilera	PSC
2003–2007	Francesc Martos i Aguilera / José Orive I Vélez	PSC
2007–2016	José Orive I Vélez / Emilio Cordero Soria	PSC
2016–present	Emilio Cordero Soria (incumbent)	PSC

=== List of mayors from 1900 to 1979 ===
Term	Name of mayor	Political party
Restauración Borbónica
1890–1906	Francesc Espargaró i Planas	-
1906–1910	Joan Pous i Roger	-
1910–1916	Francesc Botines i Galitó	-
1916–1918	Esteve Grau i Montpart	-
1918–1923	Jaume Gispert i Cassà	-
1923–1930	Miquel Julià i Gorchs	-
1930–1931	Jaume Gispert i Cassà	-
Second Spanish Republic
1931–1933	Francesc Pous i Gorguí	Acció Catalana Republicana
1933–1934	Josep Gratacòs i Peicasat	ERC
1934–1936	Jaume Gispert i Cassà	-
1936	Amadeu Facundo i Vidal	Unió de Rebassaires-PSUC
1936–1937	Antoni Riera i Genevat	CNT-FAI de Canovelles
1937–1938	Nemesio Sanz i Barrachina	PSUC
1938	Francesc Pous i Gorguí	Acció Catalana Republicana
Franquism
1939–1952	Isidre Duran i Blanchart	-
1952–1960	Ignasi Julià i Argemí	-
1960–1969	Felip Argemí i Orriols	-
1969–1979	Joan Dordas i Vila	-

== Electoral results ==

=== 1995 ===
Party	Votes	%	Councillors
PSC-Progrés Municipal	4.132	63,44	13
Convergència i Unió	788	12,10	2
PP	525	8,06	1
ICV	474	7,28	1
ERC	272	4,18	0
Canovelles Unida (EUiA)	194	3,40	0

=== 1999 ===
Party	Votes	%	Councillors
PSC-Progrés Municipal	3.928	68,78%	15
Convergència i Unió	518	9,07	1
PP	491	8,60	1
EUiA	258	4,52	0
ERC	243	4,25	0
ICV	194	3,40	0

=== 2003 ===
Party	Votes	%	Councillors
PSC-Progrés Municipal	3.351	56,02	10
Convergència i Unió	808	13,51	2
ICV-EUiA	624	10,43	2
PP	624	10,43	2
ERC	495	8,27	1

=== 2007 ===
Party	Votes	%	Councillors
PSC-Progrés Municipal	2.816	53,89	11
Convergència i Unió	705	13,49	2
ICV-EUiA	540	10,33	2
PP	512	9,80	1
ERC	337	6,45	1
Ciutadans	216	4,13	0

== Transportation ==
=== Highways ===
- C-17 – Located on the exit by Ronda Nord and by the exit at Granollers-Canovelles BV1432 and BV1439

=== Railways ===
- Granollers-Canovelles railway station – Line 3 of the Rodalies Barcelona
