= Aiguafreda, Spain =

Aiguafreda
- Municipality
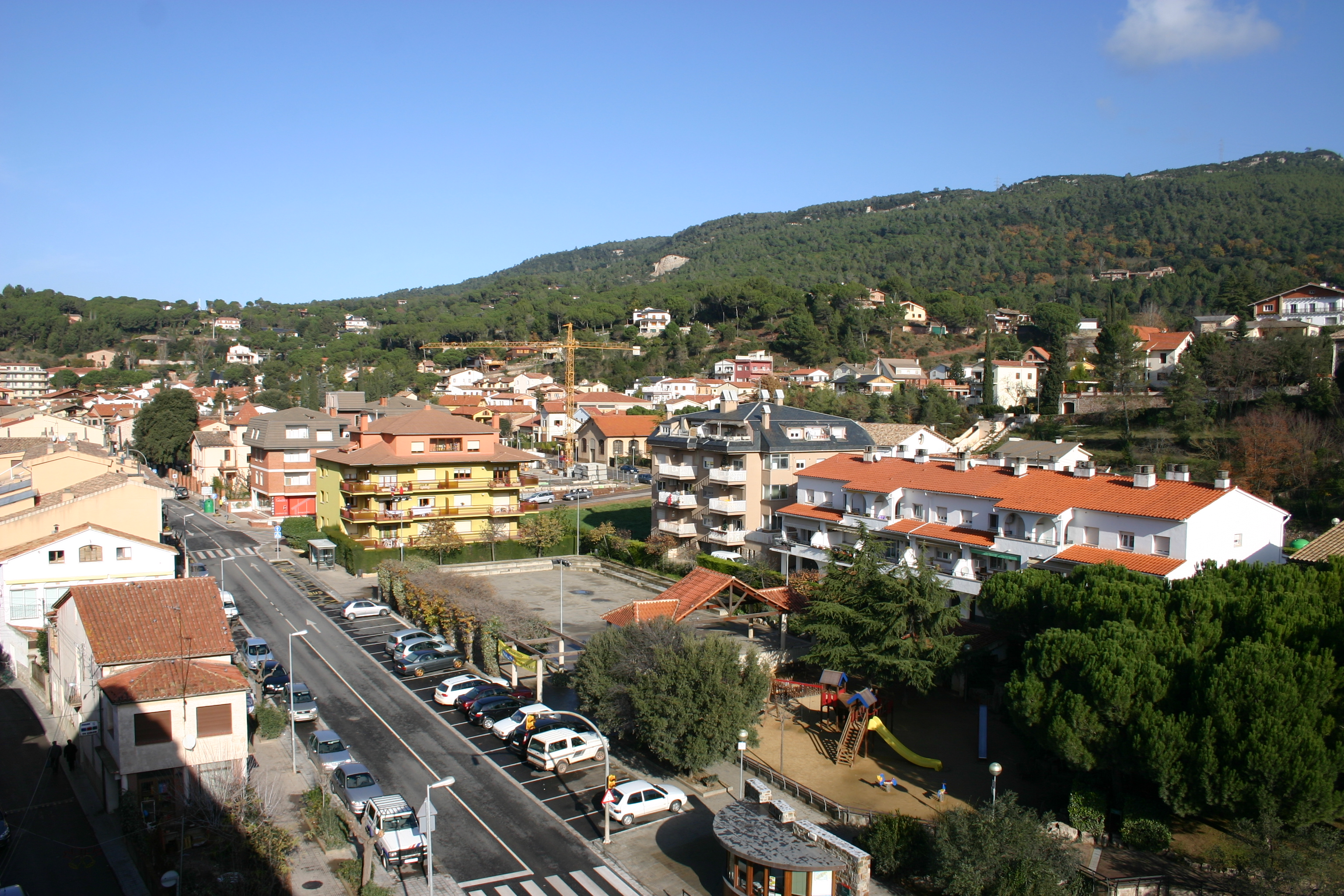
- Panoramic view

- Flag Coat of arms

- Location in Catalonia Aiguafreda (Spain)
- Coordinates: 41°46′9″N 2°15′16″E
- Country: Spain
- Community: Catalonia
- Province: Barcelona
- Comarca: Osona

Government
  - Mayor: Miquel Parella Codina

Area
  - Total: 7.997 km^{2} (3.088 sq mi)

Population (November 1, 2011)
  - Total: 2,469
  - Density: 308.7/km^{2} (800/sq mi)
- Time zone: UTC+01:00 (CET)
- Postal code: 08591
- Area code: 080142
- Website: Official website

Aiguafreda (Catalan pronunciation: [ˌajɣwəˈfɾɛðə]) is a municipality in the comarca of Osona, in the province of Barcelona, Catalonia, Spain. It is located near the Montseny massif. It has a population of 2,190 and occupies an area of 7.96 km².

The principal economic activities are tourism and the textile industry.

There is a large dolmen located in the center of the property of can Brull, and the church of Aiguafreda de Dalt, founded by the abbess Emma, daughter of the count Wilfred the Hairy.

== Demography ==
According to Spanish census data, this is the population of Aiguafreda in recent years.

1981	1991	2001	2011
2,034	2,063	2,155	2,469
