= Sant Pere de Vilamajor =

- Municipality
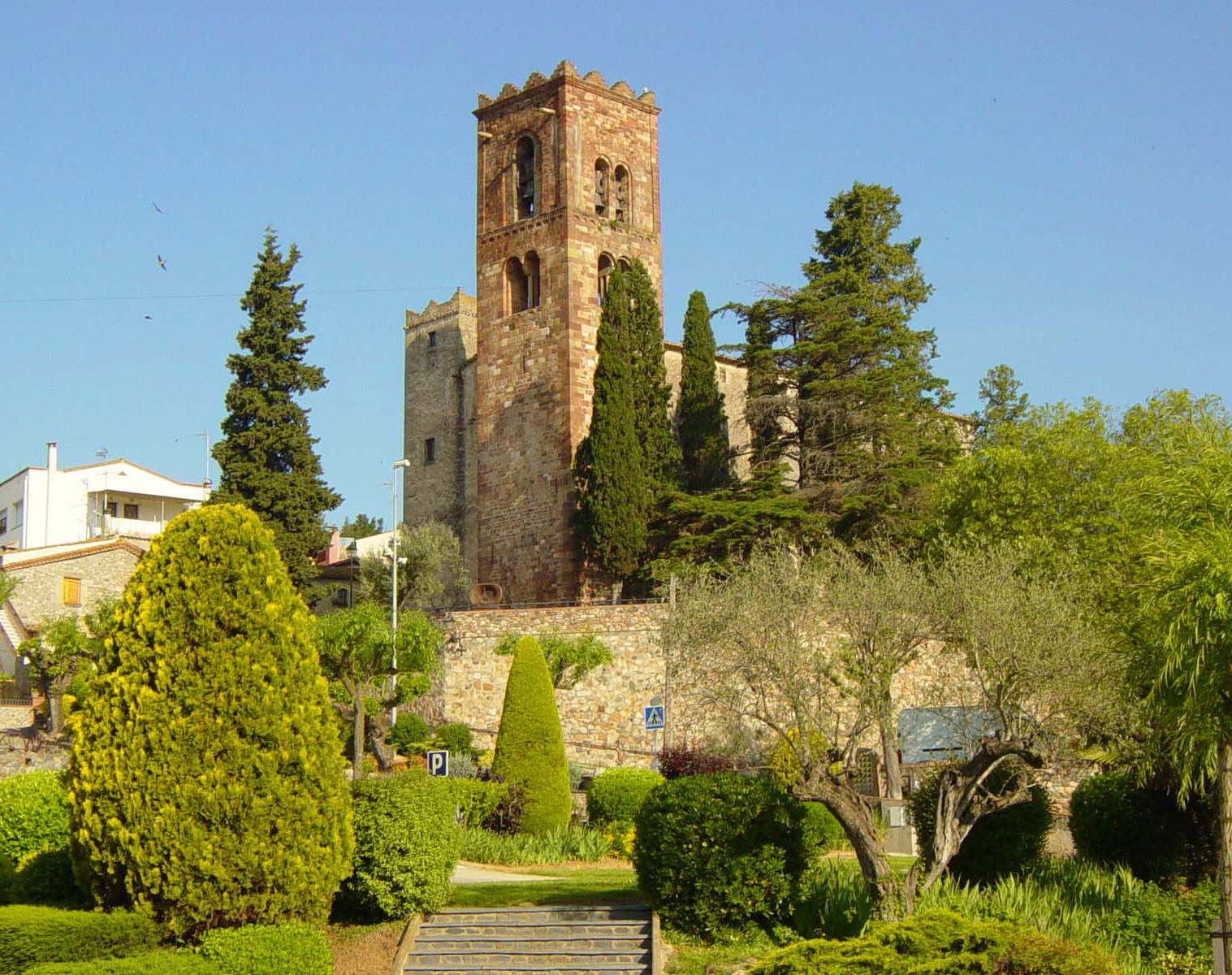
- The tower of the castle of Vilamajor

- Flag Coat of arms

- Location in Catalonia Sant Pere de Vilamajor (Spain)
- Coordinates: 41°41′8″N 2°23′24″E
- Country: Spain
- Community: Catalonia
- Province: Barcelona
- Comarca: Vallès Oriental

Government
  - Mayor: Jésica Pérez Carbonell (2025)

Area
  - Total: 34.7 km^{2} (13.4 sq mi)

Population (2025-01-01)
  - Total: 5,074
  - Density: 146/km^{2} (379/sq mi)
- Website: vilamajor.cat

Sant Pere de Vilamajor (Catalan pronunciation: [ˈsam ˈpeɾə ðə ˌβiləməˈʒo]) is a village in the province of Barcelona and autonomous community of Catalonia, Spain. The municipality covers an area of 13.8 square kilometres (5.3 sq mi) and the population in 2014 was 4,248.
