= Figaró-Montmany =

- Municipality
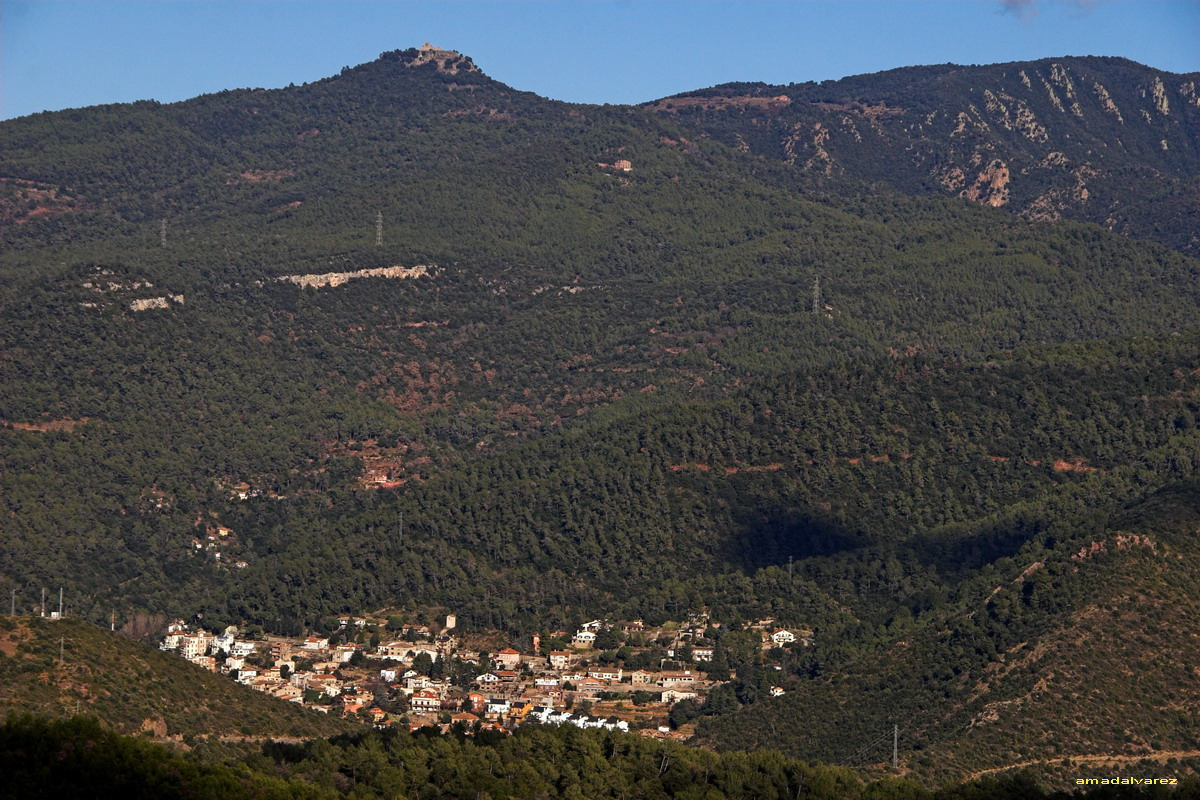

- Flag Coat of arms

- Location in Catalonia Figaró-Montmany (Spain)
- Coordinates: 41°43′22″N 2°16′30″E
- Country: Spain
- Community: Catalonia
- Province: Barcelona
- Comarca: Vallès Oriental

Government
  - Mayor: Mayte Carrillo García (2015)

Area
  - Total: 15.0 km^{2} (5.8 sq mi)

Population (2025-01-01)
  - Total: 1,195
  - Density: 79.7/km^{2} (206/sq mi)
- Website: figaro-montmany.cat

Figaró-Montmany (Catalan pronunciation: [fiɣəˈɾo ˌmomˈmaɲ]) is a municipality in the province of Barcelona and autonomous community of Catalonia, Spain. The municipality covers an area of 15.07 square kilometres (5.82 sq mi) and the population in 2014 was 1,096.
