= Vallès Oriental =

Coordinates: 41°38′47″N 2°18′28″E

- Comarca
- Country: Spain
- Autonomous community: Catalonia
- Province: Barcelona
- Region: Àmbit metropolità de Barcelona
- Capital: Granollers
- Municipalities: List: Aiguafreda, L'Ametlla del Vallès, Bigues i Riells, Caldes de Montbui, Campins, Canovelles, Cànoves i Samalús, Cardedeu, Figaró-Montmany, Fogars de Montclús, Les Franqueses del Vallès, La Garriga, Granollers, Gualba, La Llagosta, Lliçà d'Amunt, Lliçà de Vall, Llinars del Vallès, Martorelles, Mollet del Vallès, Montmeló, Montornès del Vallès, Montseny, Parets del Vallès, La Roca del Vallès, Sant Antoni de Vilamajor, Sant Celoni, Sant Esteve de Palautordera, Sant Feliu de Codines, Sant Fost de Campsentelles, Sant Pere de Vilamajor, Santa Eulàlia de Ronçana, Santa Maria de Martorelles, Santa Maria de Palautordera, Tagamanent, Vallgorguina, Vallromanes, Vilalba Sasserra, Vilanova del Vallès

Government
  - Body: Vallès Oriental Comarcal Council
  - President: Emilio Cordero (PSC) (2019–present)

Area
  - Total: 734.5 km^{2} (283.6 sq mi)

Population (2014)
  - Total: 399,781
  - Density: 544.3/km^{2} (1,410/sq mi)
- adjusted following Moianès creation
- Demonym
- Time zone: UTC+1 (CET)
  - Summer (DST): UTC+2 (CEST)
- Largest municipality: Granollers
- Website: www.vallesoriental.cat

Vallès Oriental (Catalan: [bəˈʎɛz uɾi.ənˈtal], Spanish: [baˈʎes oɾjenˈtal]) is a comarca (county) in the Barcelona region in Catalonia, Spain. Its capital is Granollers. Along with Vallès Occidental it forms the historical Vallès region.

In May 2015, Vallès Oriental lost four municipalities - Castellcir, Castellterçol, Granera, Sant Quirze Safaja - to the new comarca of Moianès.

== Municipalities ==
Municipality	Population (2014)	Area km^{2}
Aiguafreda	2,498	7.9
L'Ametlla del Vallès	8,283	14.2
Bigues i Riells	8,854	28.6
Caldes de Montbui	17,156	37.4
Campins	521	7.3
Canovelles	15,954	6.7
Cànoves i Samalús	2,863	29.2
Cardedeu	17,698	12.1
Figaró-Montmany	1,096	15.0
Fogars de Montclús	482	39.7
Les Franqueses del Vallès	19,170	29.1
La Garriga	15,762	18.8
Granollers	59,930	14.9
Gualba	1,429	23.3
La Llagosta	13,430	3.0
Lliçà d'Amunt	14,696	22.3
Lliçà de Vall	6,354	10.8
Llinars del Vallès	9,536	27.6
Martorelles	4,783	3.6
Mollet del Vallès	51,719	10.8
Montmeló	8,863	4.0
Montornès del Vallès	16,217	10.2
Montseny	332	26.8
Parets del Vallès	18,733	9.1
La Roca del Vallès	10,518	36.9
Sant Antoni de Vilamajor	5,708	13.7
Sant Celoni	17,251	65.2
Sant Esteve de Palautordera	2,532	10.6
Sant Feliu de Codines	5,900	15.0
Sant Fost de Campsentelles	8,666	13.2
Sant Pere de Vilamajor	4,248	34.7
Santa Eulàlia de Ronçana	7,114	14.2
Santa Maria de Martorelles	851	4.5
Santa Maria de Palautordera	9,138	16.9
Tagamanent	322	43.3
Vallgorguina	2,699	22.1
Vallromanes	2,519	10.6
Vilalba Sasserra	706	6.0
Vilanova del Vallès	5,250	15.2
• Total: 39	399,781	734.5

== Vegetation ==
The natural vegetation of Vallès Oriental is typically Mediterranean, with a predominance of Holm oak, cork oak, and Aleppo pine. There are some oaks (in the narrow sense of the word) at Montnegre and Montseny. The latter also features European beech and silver fir woods.

== Politics and government ==
=== Comarcal council ===
Councilors in the Comarcal Council of Vallès Oriental since 1987
Key to parties CUP ICV ICV–EUiA–EPM BComú–E (ENTESA) En Comú–ECG ECG–C ERC AAEVO PSC JxCat Junts PDeCAT CiU Cs PP Vox
Election	Distribution	President
1987	3 / 2 / 11 / 17	Josep Serratusell (CiU)
1991	3 / 1 / 3 / 12 / 14	Jordi Terrades (PSC)
1995	3 / 3 / 3 / 10 / 12 / 2	Jordi Terrades (PSC)
1999	1 / 3 / 14 / 13 / 2	Jordi Terrades (PSC)
2003	4 / 5 / 12 / 10 / 2	Joan Castaño (PSC)
2007	3 / 4 / 14 / 10 / 2	Antonio Rísquez (PSC)
2011	4 / 4 / 12 / 10 / 3	José Orive (PSC)
2015	2 / 4 / 8 / 9 / 8 / 1 / 1	David Ricart (ERC)
2019	1 / 2 / 11 / 10 / 7 / 2	Emilio Cordero (PSC)
2023	1 / 3 / 8 / 12 / 8 / 1	Emilio Cordero (PSC)
