= Santa Maria de Martorelles =

- Municipality
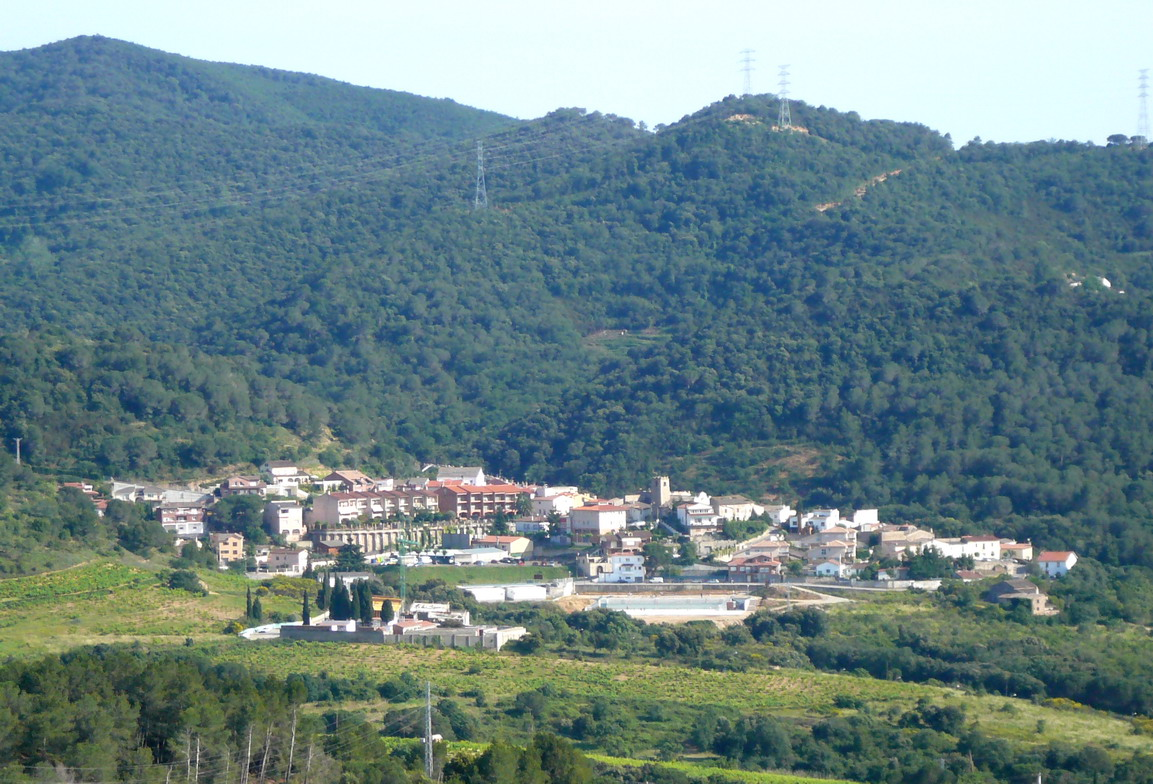
- Santa Maria de Martorelles

- Flag Coat of arms

- Location in Catalonia Santa Maria de Martorelles (Spain)
- Coordinates: 41°31′11″N 2°15′14″E
- Country: Spain
- Community: Catalonia
- Province: Barcelona
- Comarca: Vallès Oriental
- Established: 1927

Government
  - mayor: Julián Trapero Frias (2015)

Area
  - Total: 4.5 km^{2} (1.7 sq mi)

Population (2025-01-01)
  - Total: 868
  - Density: 190/km^{2} (500/sq mi)
- Postal code: 08106
- Website: www.santamariademartorelles.cat

Santa Maria de Martorelles (Catalan pronunciation: [ˈsantə məˈɾi.ə ðə məɾtuˈɾɛʎəs]) is a village in the province of Barcelona and autonomous community of Catalonia, Spain. The municipality covers an area of 4.49 square kilometres (1.73 sq mi) and the population in 2014 was 851.
