= La Llagosta =

- Municipality
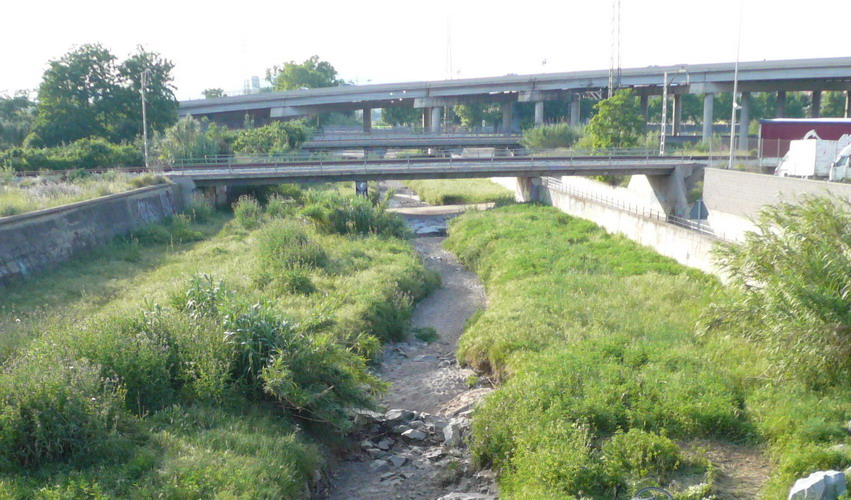

- Flag Coat of arms

- Location within Province of Barcelona Location within Spain
- Coordinates: 41°30′56″N 2°11′34″E
- Country: Spain
- autonomous community: Catalonia
- Province: Barcelona
- Comarca: Valles Oriental

Government
  - Mayor: Òscar Sierra Gaona (2015) (ICV-EUiA)

Area
  - Total: 3.0 km^{2} (1.2 sq mi)
- Elevation: 45 m (148 ft)

Population (2025-01-01)
  - Total: 13,280
  - Density: 4,400/km^{2} (11,000/sq mi)
- Postal code: 08120
- Website: www.llagosta.cat

La Llagosta (Catalan pronunciation: [lə ʎəˈɣostə]) is municipality in the province of Barcelona and autonomous community of Catalonia, Spain. The municipality covers an area of 3.03 square kilometres (1.17 sq mi) and the population in 2014 was 13,430.

== Notable people ==
- Antonio García Robledo, Spanish handball player and world champion
