= Santa Maria de Palautordera =

Santa María de Palautordera
- Municipality
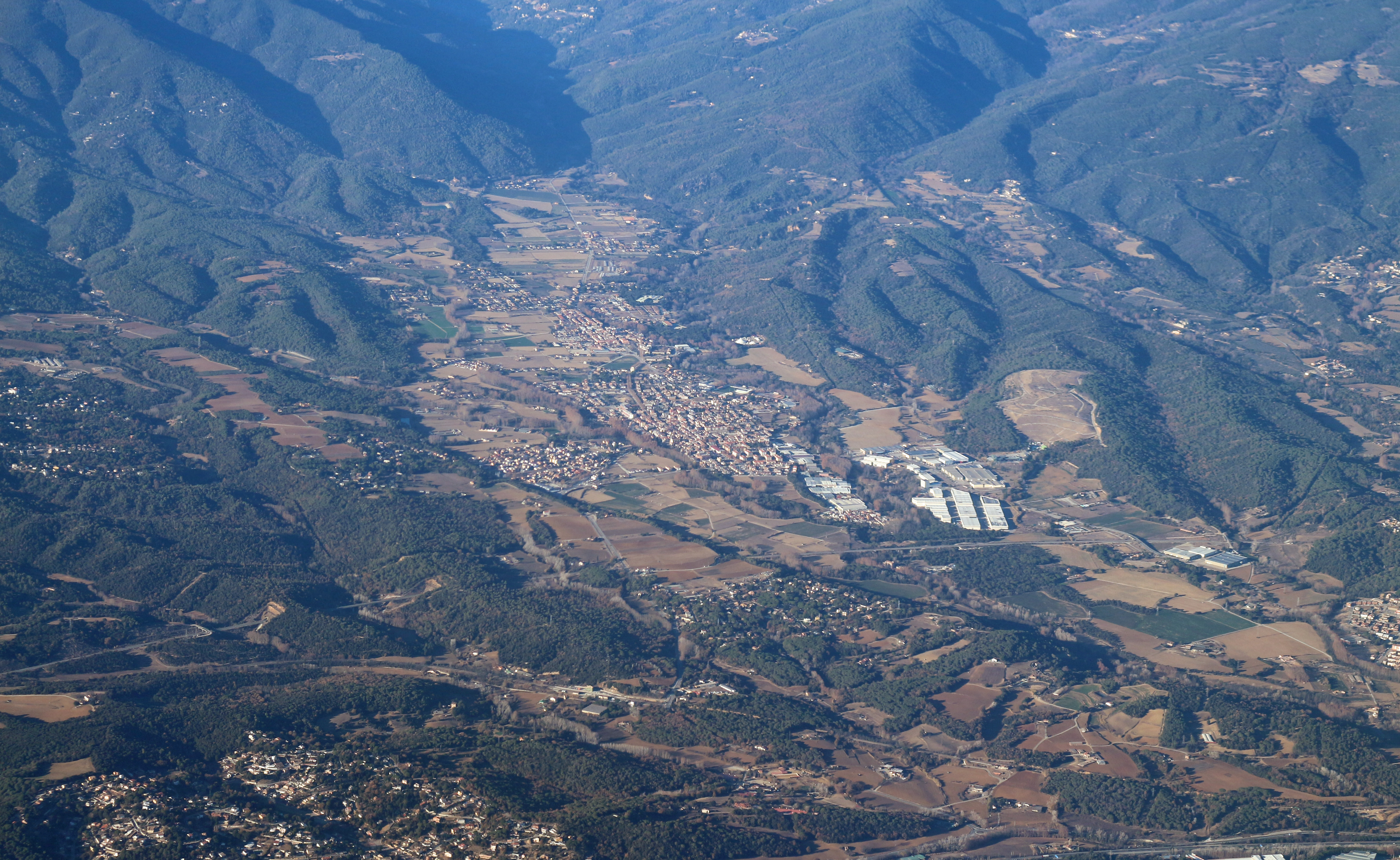
- Aerial view from jetliners landing at Josep Tarradellas Barcelona-El Prat Airport

- Coat of arms

- Location in Catalonia Santa María de Palautordera (Spain)
- Coordinates: 41°41′43″N 2°26′45″E
- Country: Spain
- Autonomous community: Catalonia
- Province: Barcelona
- Comarca: Valles Oriental

Government
  - Alcalde: Jordi Xena Ibáñez (2015) (CiU)

Area
  - Total: 16.9 km^{2} (6.5 sq mi)
- Elevation: 208 m (682 ft)

Population (2025-01-01)
  - Total: 10,080
  - Density: 596/km^{2} (1,540/sq mi)
- Demonym(s): Palauenc, Palauenca
- Time zone: UTC+1 (CET)
  - Summer (DST): UTC+2 (CEST)
- Postal code: 08460
- Official language(s): Catalan
- Website: smpalautordera.cat

Santa María de Palautordera (Catalan pronunciation: [ˈsantə məˈɾi.ə ðə pəˌlawtuɾˈðeɾə]) is a village and municipality in the comarca of Vallès Oriental in the province of Barcelona and autonomous community of Catalonia, Spain.

== Geography ==
The village is situated in the valley of the River Tordera, at the foot of the Montseny Massif. The vegetation is predominantly pine and oak woods.

== Demographics ==
The population of Santa María de Palautordera as measured by the Town Hall was 9,103 in 2015. The Municipal Population Register has been produced annually since 1998 and demonstrates the change in population:

Year	Men	Women	Total
2013	4,700	4,495	9,195
2008	4,445	4,169	8,614
2003	3,779	3,539	7,318
1998	2,916	2,879	5,795

== Transport ==
Santa María de Palautordera is served by its own station (simply called Palautordera) on the Rodalies de Catalunya regional rail system. The system is currently operated by the Catalan Government.

== Notable people ==
- David Davis Cámara, international handball player for Spain.
- Joan Cañellas, international handball player for Spain.

== Twin towns ==
Santa María de Palautordera is twinned with:

- - Arjona, Jaén, Spain
