= Tagamanent =

- Municipality
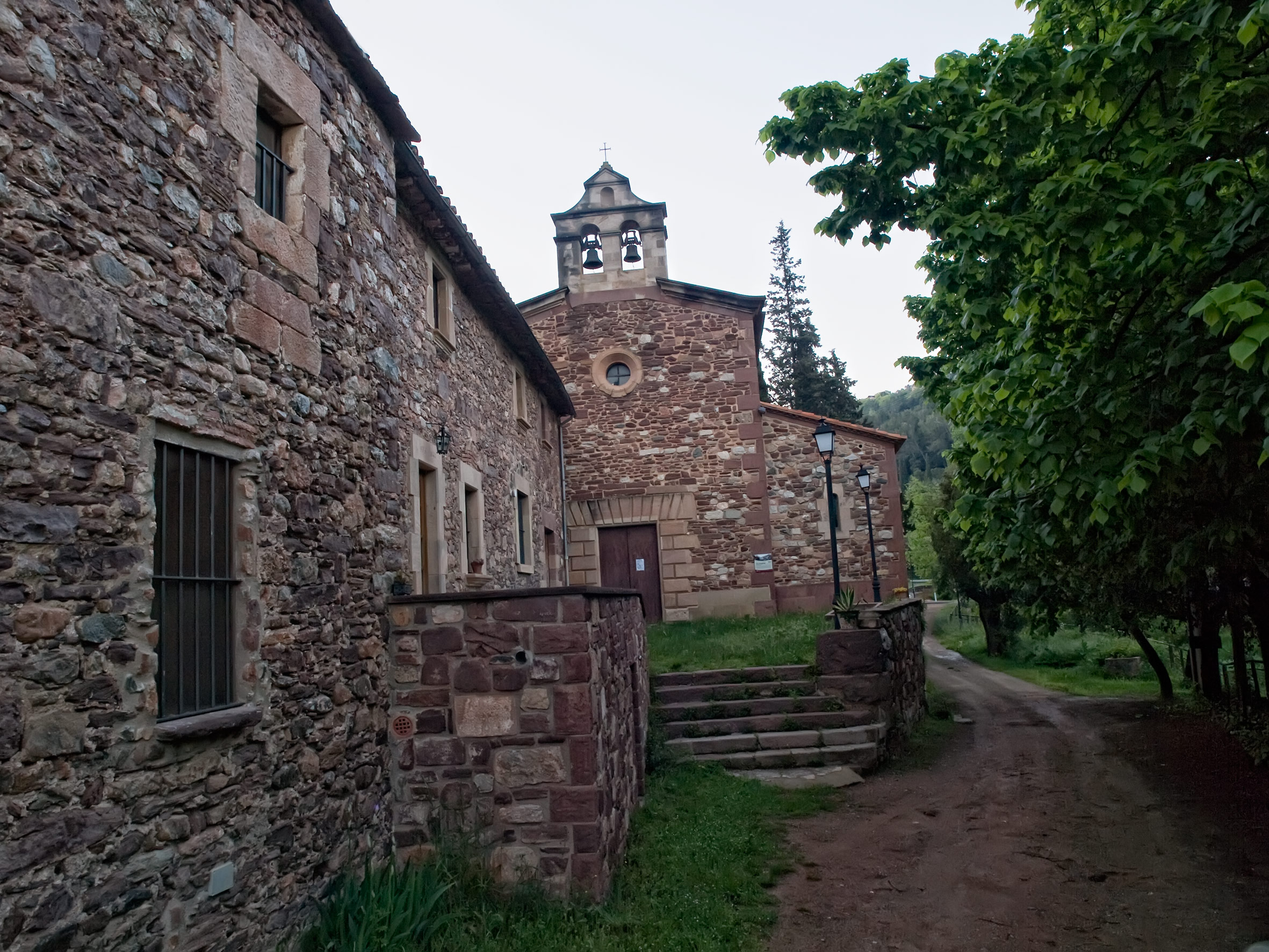
- Church of Santa Eugènia del Congost

- Flag Coat of arms

- Location in Catalonia Tagamanent (Spain)
- Coordinates: 41.741°N 2.265°E
- Country: Spain
- Community: Catalonia
- Province: Barcelona
- Comarca: Vallès Oriental

Government
  - Mayor: Luis Ignacio Martínez Murciano (2015)

Area
  - Total: 43.3 km^{2} (16.7 sq mi)

Population (2025-01-01)
  - Total: 328
  - Density: 7.58/km^{2} (19.6/sq mi)
- Website: tagamanent.cat

Tagamanent (Catalan pronunciation: [ˌtaɣəməˈnen]) is a village in the province of Barcelona and autonomous community of Catalonia, Spain. The municipality covers an area of 43.8 square kilometres (16.9 sq mi) and the population in 2020 was 318.

== Notable people ==
- Gemma Font (born 1999), footballer for Barcelona and the Catalonia national team
