= Lliçà de Vall =

- Municipality
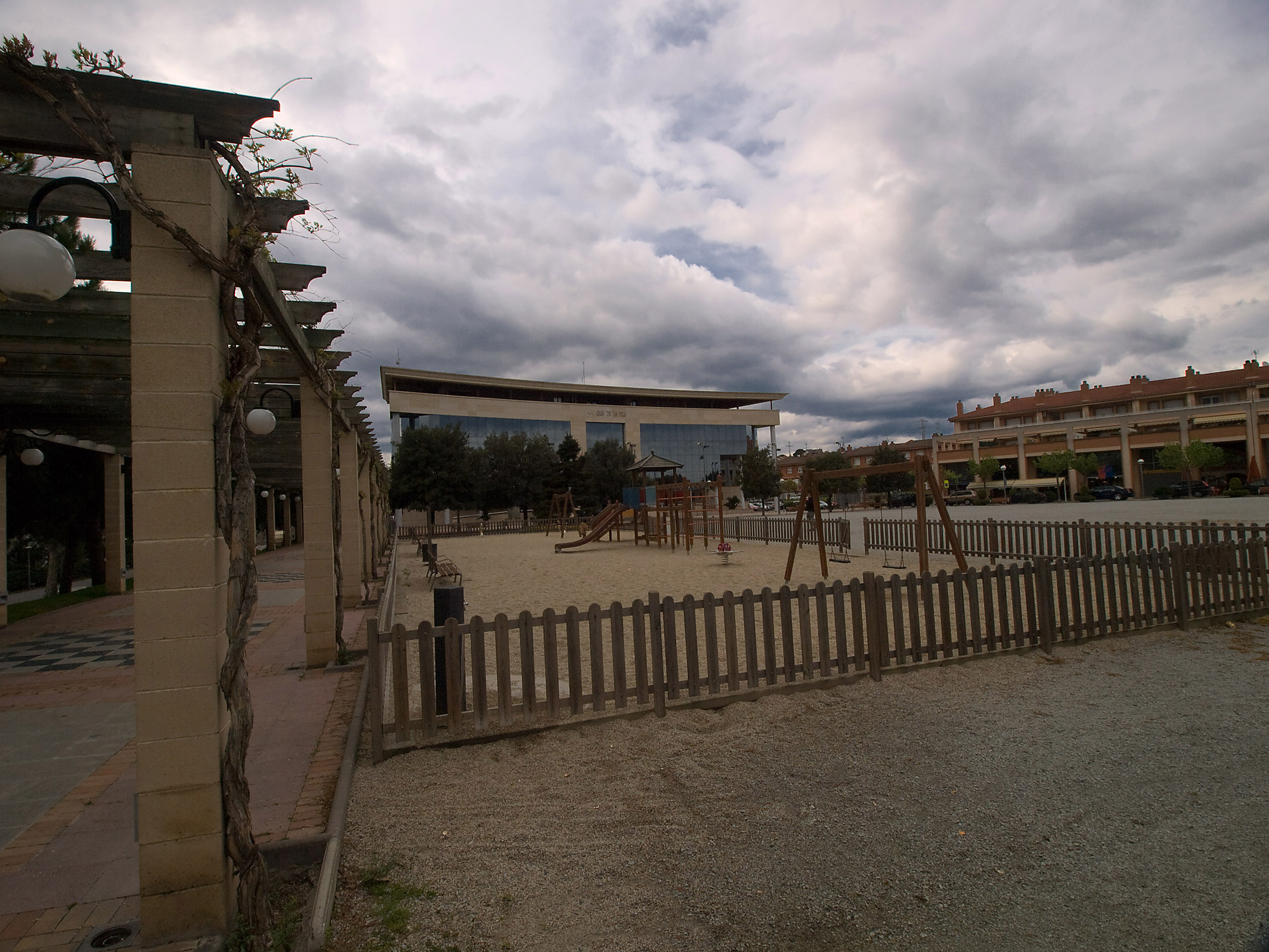

- Flag Coat of arms

- Location in Catalonia Lliçà de Vall (Spain)
- Coordinates: 41°35′37″N 2°14′35″E
- Country: Spain
- autonomous community: Catalonia
- Province: Barcelona
- Comarca: Valles Oriental

Government
  - mayor: Josep Serra Busquets (2015)

Area
  - Total: 10.8 km^{2} (4.2 sq mi)
- Elevation: 125 m (410 ft)

Population (2025-01-01)
  - Total: 6,903
  - Density: 639/km^{2} (1,660/sq mi)
- Postal code: 08185
- Website: www.llissadevall.cat

Lliçà de Vall (Catalan pronunciation: [ʎiˈsa ðə ˈβaʎ]; Spanish: Llissá de Vall) is a municipality in Catalonia, Spain in the province of Barcelona in the comarca, Valles Oriental. As of 2025, the population is 6,903 inhabitants.
