= Cànoves i Samalús =

- Municipality
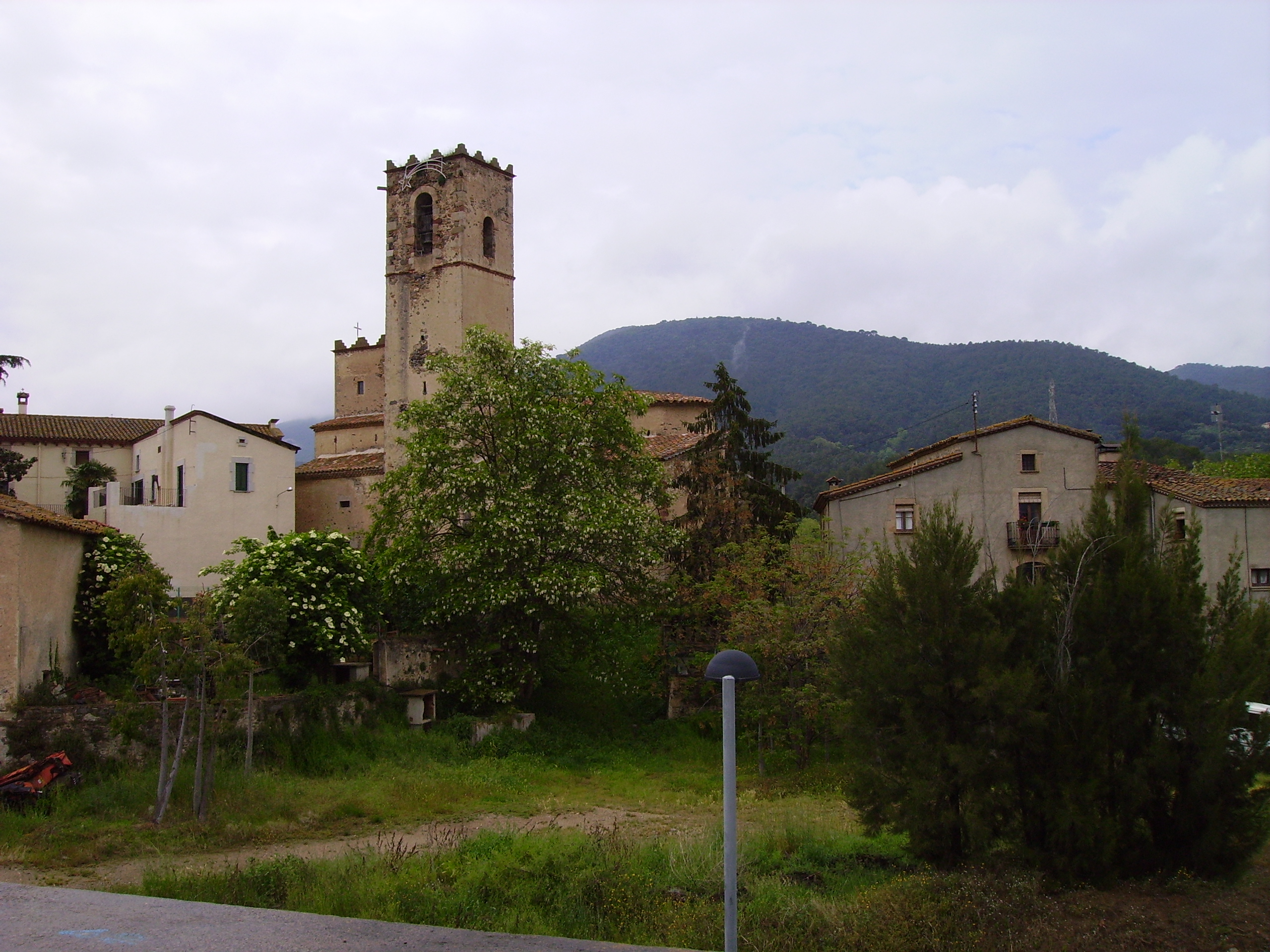

- Flag Coat of arms

- Location in Catalonia Cànoves i Samalús (Spain)
- Coordinates: 41°41′26″N 2°21′20″E
- Country: Spain
- Community: Catalonia
- Province: Barcelona
- Comarca: Vallès Oriental

Government
  - Mayor: Josep Cuch Codina (2015)

Area
  - Total: 29.2 km^{2} (11.3 sq mi)

Population (2025-01-01)
  - Total: 3,399
  - Density: 116/km^{2} (301/sq mi)
- Website: canovesisamalus.cat

Cànoves i Samalús (Catalan pronunciation: [ˈkanuβəz i səməˈlus]) is a village in the comarca of Vallès Oriental in the province of Barcelona and autonomous community of Catalonia, Spain. The municipality covers an area of 28.48 square kilometres (11.00 sq mi) and the population in 2014 was 2,863.
