= Santa Eulàlia de Ronçana =

- Municipality
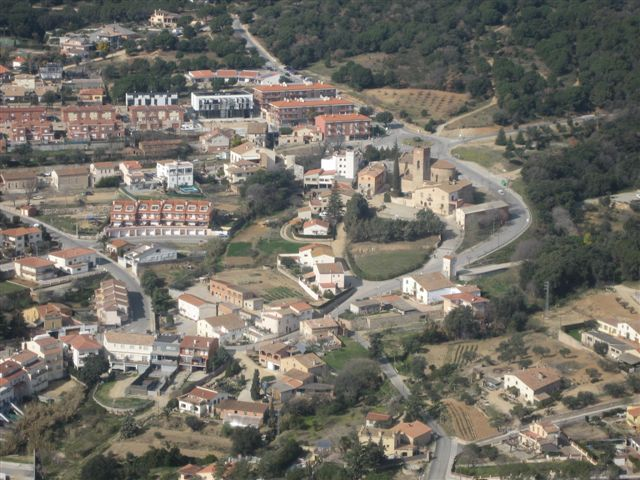

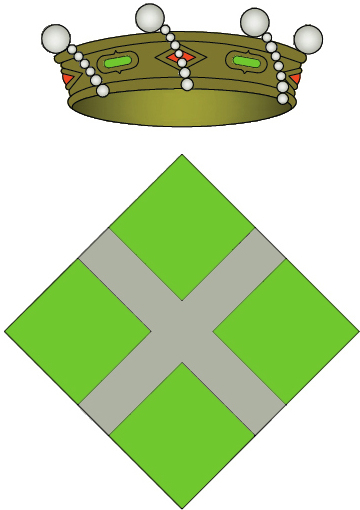
- Flag Coat of arms

- Location in Catalonia Santa Eulàlia de Ronçana (Spain)
- Coordinates: 41°39′11″N 2°13′34″E
- Country: Spain
- Community: Catalonia
- Province: Barcelona
- Comarca: Vallès Oriental

Government
  - Mayor: Francesc Bonet Nieto (2015)

Area
  - Total: 14.2 km^{2} (5.5 sq mi)

Population (2025-01-01)
  - Total: 7,953
  - Density: 560/km^{2} (1,450/sq mi)
- Website: ser.cat

Santa Eulàlia de Ronçana (Catalan pronunciation: [ˌsantəwˈlaliə ðə runˈsanə]) is a village in the province of Barcelona and autonomous community of Catalonia, Spain. The municipality covers an area of 14.2 square kilometres (5.5 sq mi) and the population in 2014 was 7,114.
