= L'Ametlla del Vallès =

- Municipality
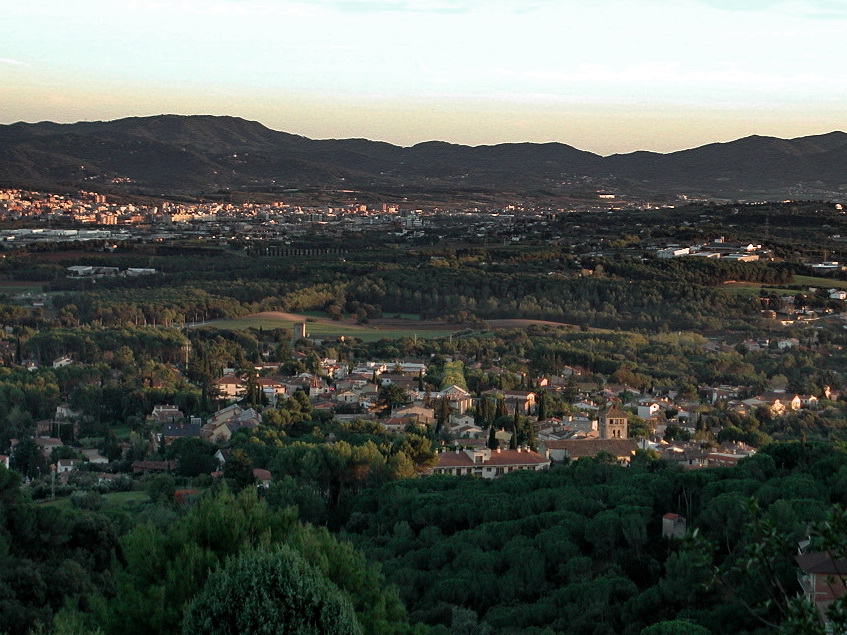
- L'Ametlla del Vallès

- Flag Coat of arms

- Location in Catalonia L'Ametlla del Vallès (Spain)
- Coordinates: 41°40′10″N 2°15′48″E
- Country: Spain
- Community: Catalonia
- Province: Barcelona
- Comarca: Vallès Oriental

Government
  - Mayor: Pep Moret i Tanyà (ERC)

Area
  - Total: 14.24 km^{2} (5.50 sq mi)

Population (2025-01-01)
  - Total: 9,474
  - Density: 665.3/km^{2} (1,723/sq mi)
- Website: ametlla.cat

L'Ametlla del Vallès (Catalan pronunciation: [ləˈmɛʎʎa ðəl βəˈʎɛs]) is a village in the province of Barcelona and autonomous community of Catalonia, Spain. The municipality covers an area of 14.24 square kilometres (5.50 sq mi) and the population in 2022 was 9,020.
