= Cardedeu =

- Municipality
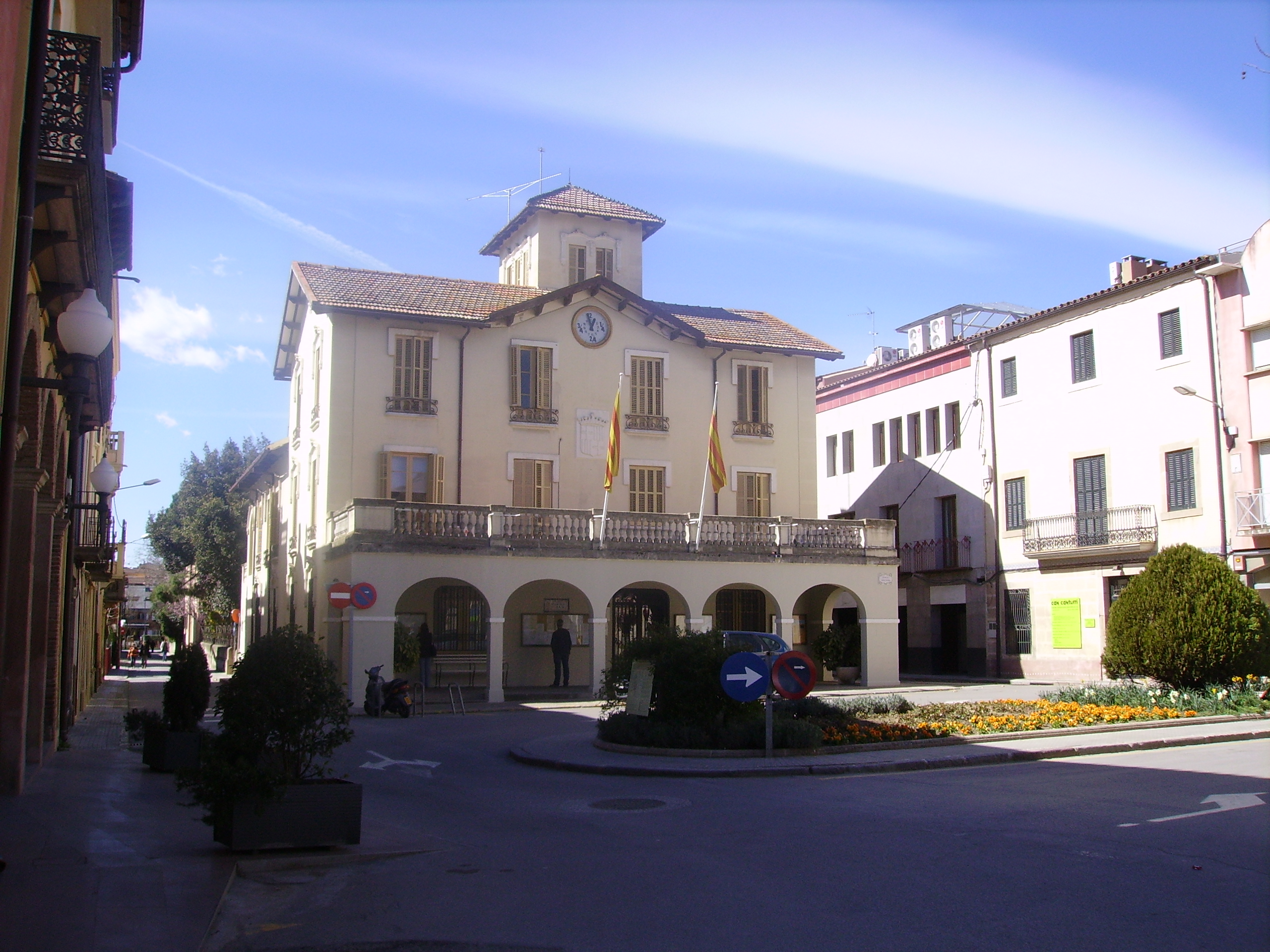

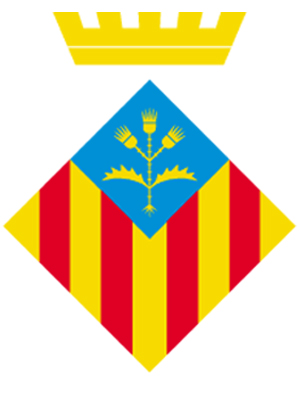
- Flag Coat of arms

- Location in Catalonia Cardedeu (Spain)
- Coordinates: 41°38′26″N 2°21′34″E
- Country: Spain
- Community: Catalonia
- Province: Barcelona
- Comarca: Vallès Oriental

Government
  - Mayor: Enric Olivé Manté (2015)

Area
  - Total: 12.1 km^{2} (4.7 sq mi)
- Elevation: 193 m (633 ft)

Population (2025-01-01)
  - Total: 19,046
  - Density: 1,570/km^{2} (4,080/sq mi)
- Demonym(s): Cardedeuenc, cardedeuenca
- Website: cardedeu.cat

Cardedeu (Catalan pronunciation: [ˌkaɾðəˈðɛw]) is a municipality in the comarca of Vallès Oriental in the province of Barcelona and autonomous community of Catalonia, Spain. It is near Granollers, the capital of Vallès Oriental, and it is placed between Serralada Litoral and Montseny.

Cardedeu is a small town of medieval origin, with the first written reference known dated in the year 941.

== Demography ==
Historical population

Year	Pop.	±%
1900	1,533	—
1910	1,671	+9.0%
1920	1,843	+10.3%
1930	2,477	+34.4%
1940	2,596	+4.8%
1950	2,619	+0.9%
1960	3,156	+20.5%
1970	5,017	+59.0%
1981	7,240	+44.3%
1990	8,911	+23.1%

Year	Pop.	±%
2000	12,078	+35.5%
2002	13,167	+9.0%
2004	14,514	+10.2%
2006	15,561	+7.2%
2008	16,102	+3.5%
2010	16,897	+4.9%
2012	17,427	+3.1%
2014	17,698	+1.6%
2016	18,158	+2.6%
2018	18,165	+0.0%

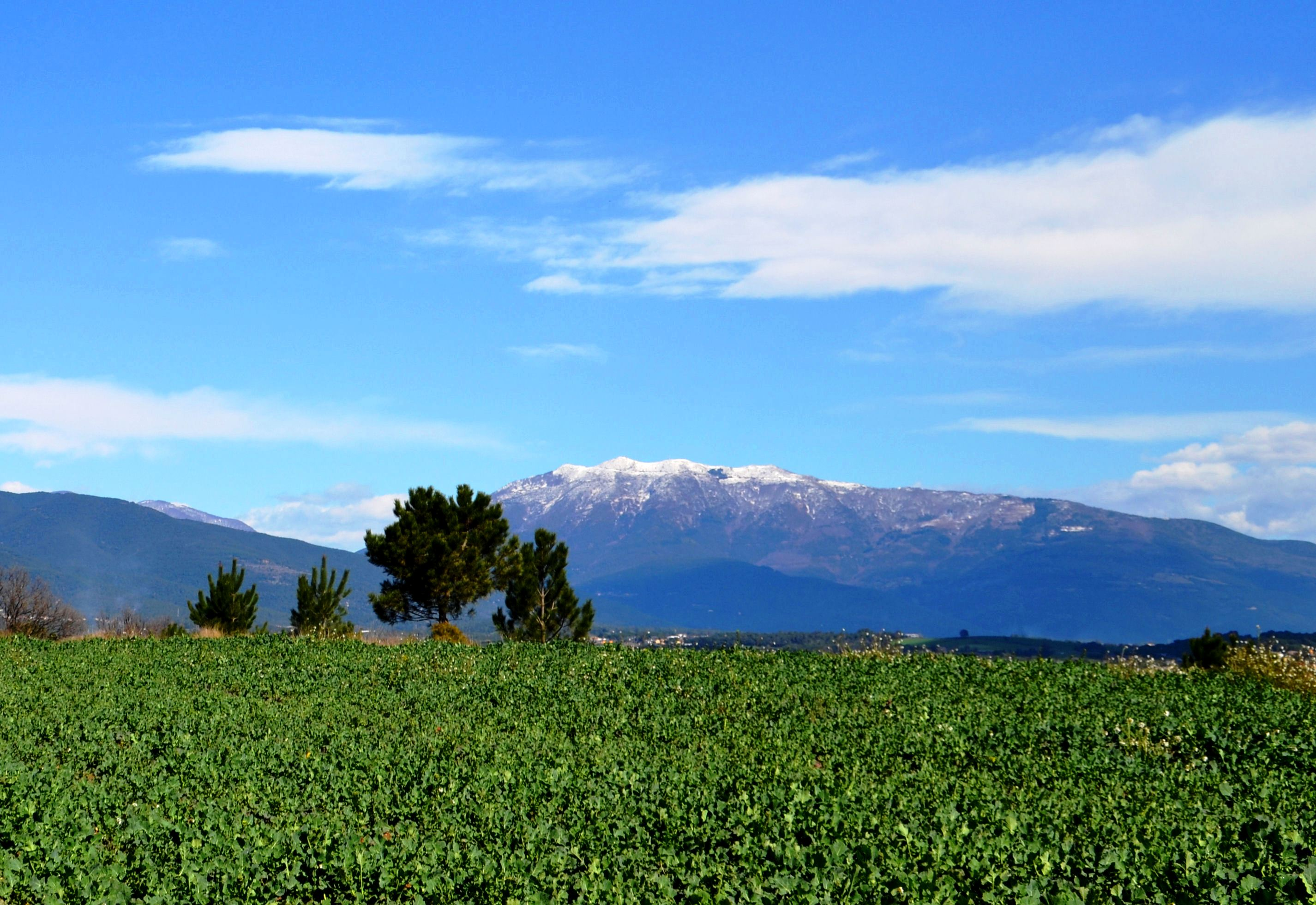
Montseny Massif, seen from Cardedeu

== Notable people ==
- Sergi Altimira, footballer.
- Adrià Altimira, footballer.
- Jaume Fort, handballer
