= Lliçà d'Amunt =

- Municipality
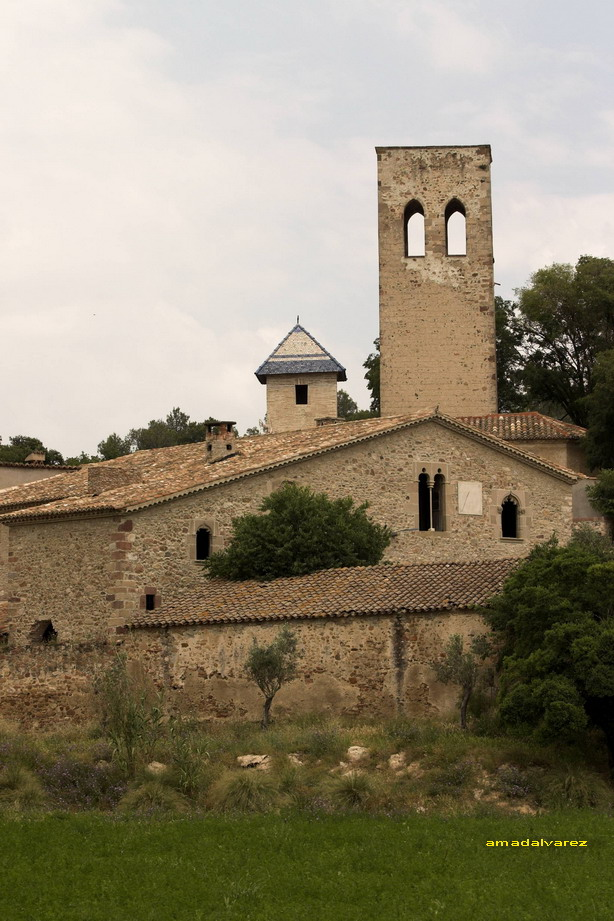
- Sant Esteve de Palaudàries

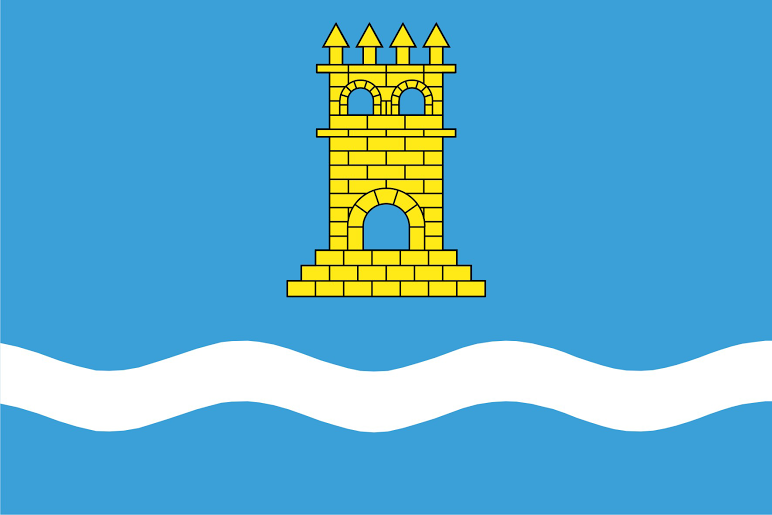
- Flag Coat of arms

- Location in Catalonia Lliçà d'Amunt (Spain)
- Coordinates: 41°36′46″N 2°14′25″E
- Country: Spain
- Community: Catalonia
- Province: Barcelona
- Comarca: Vallès Oriental

Government
  - mayor: Ignasi Simón Ortoll (2015)

Area
  - Total: 22.3 km^{2} (8.6 sq mi)
- Elevation: 145 m (476 ft)

Population (2025-01-01)
  - Total: 16,540
  - Density: 742/km^{2} (1,920/sq mi)
- Website: llicamunt.cat

Lliçà d'Amunt (Catalan pronunciation: [ʎiˈsa ðəˈmun]) or Llissá de Munt, is a municipality in Vallès Oriental, Catalonia, Spain.
