= La Roca del Vallès =

- Municipality
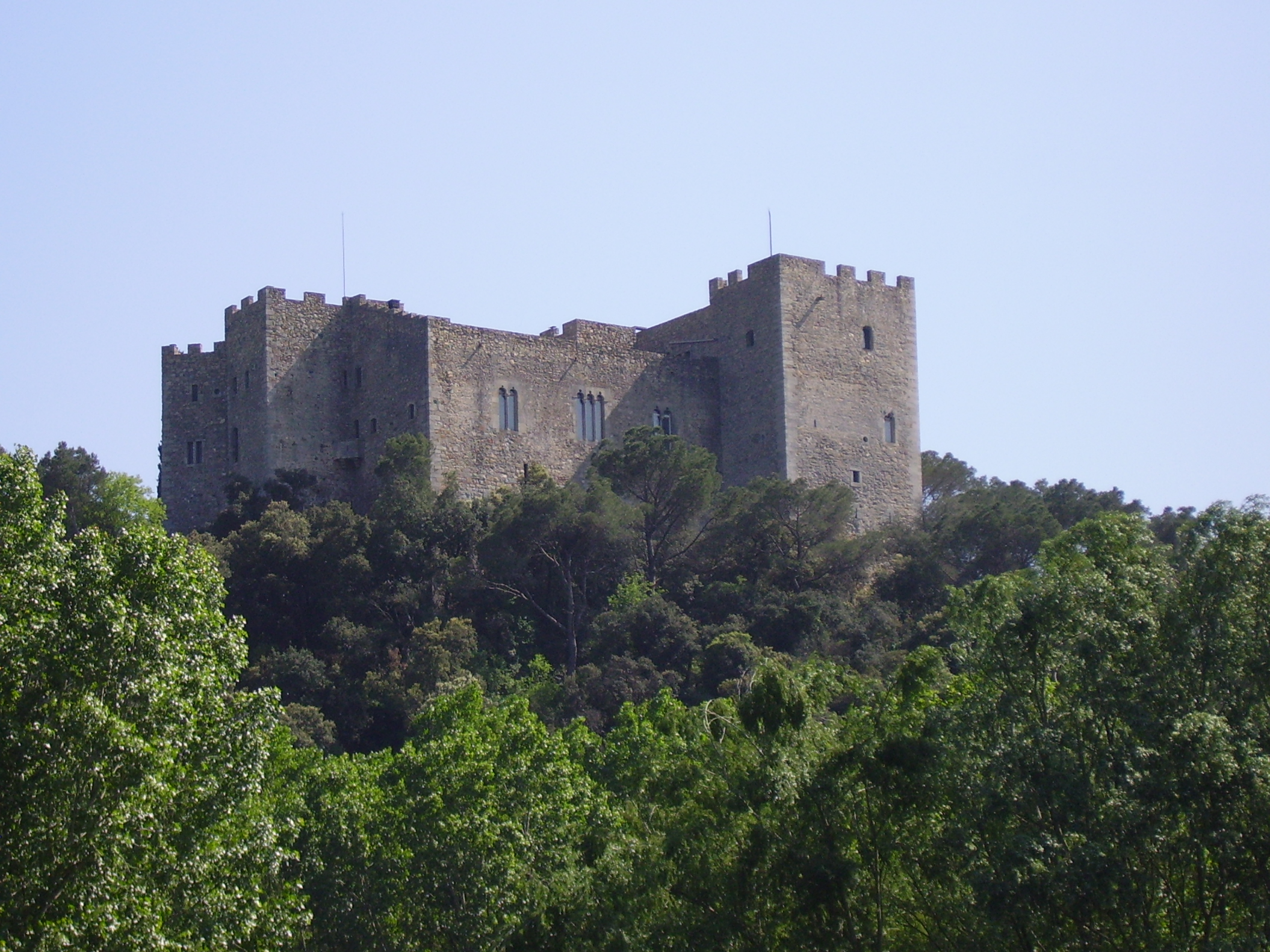
- Castle of La Roca

- Coat of arms

- Location in Catalonia La Roca del Vallès (Spain)
- Coordinates: 41°35′25″N 2°19′40″E
- Country: Spain
- Community: Catalonia
- Province: Barcelona
- Comarca: Vallès Oriental

Government
  - Mayor: Albert Gil Gutiérrez (2015)

Area
  - Total: 36.9 km^{2} (14.2 sq mi)

Population (2025-01-01)
  - Total: 11,014
  - Density: 298/km^{2} (773/sq mi)
- Website: laroca.cat

La Roca del Vallès (Catalan pronunciation: [lə ˈrɔkə ðəl βəˈʎɛs]) is a village in the comarca of Vallès Oriental in the province of Barcelona in Catalonia, Spain. The municipality covers an area of 36.9 square kilometres (14.2 sq mi) and the population in 2014 was 10,518.

== Notable people ==
- Salvador Illa (born 1966), President of the Government of Catalonia, leader of the PSC, former Spanish minister of Health and former mayor of La Roca.
