= Martorelles =

- Municipality
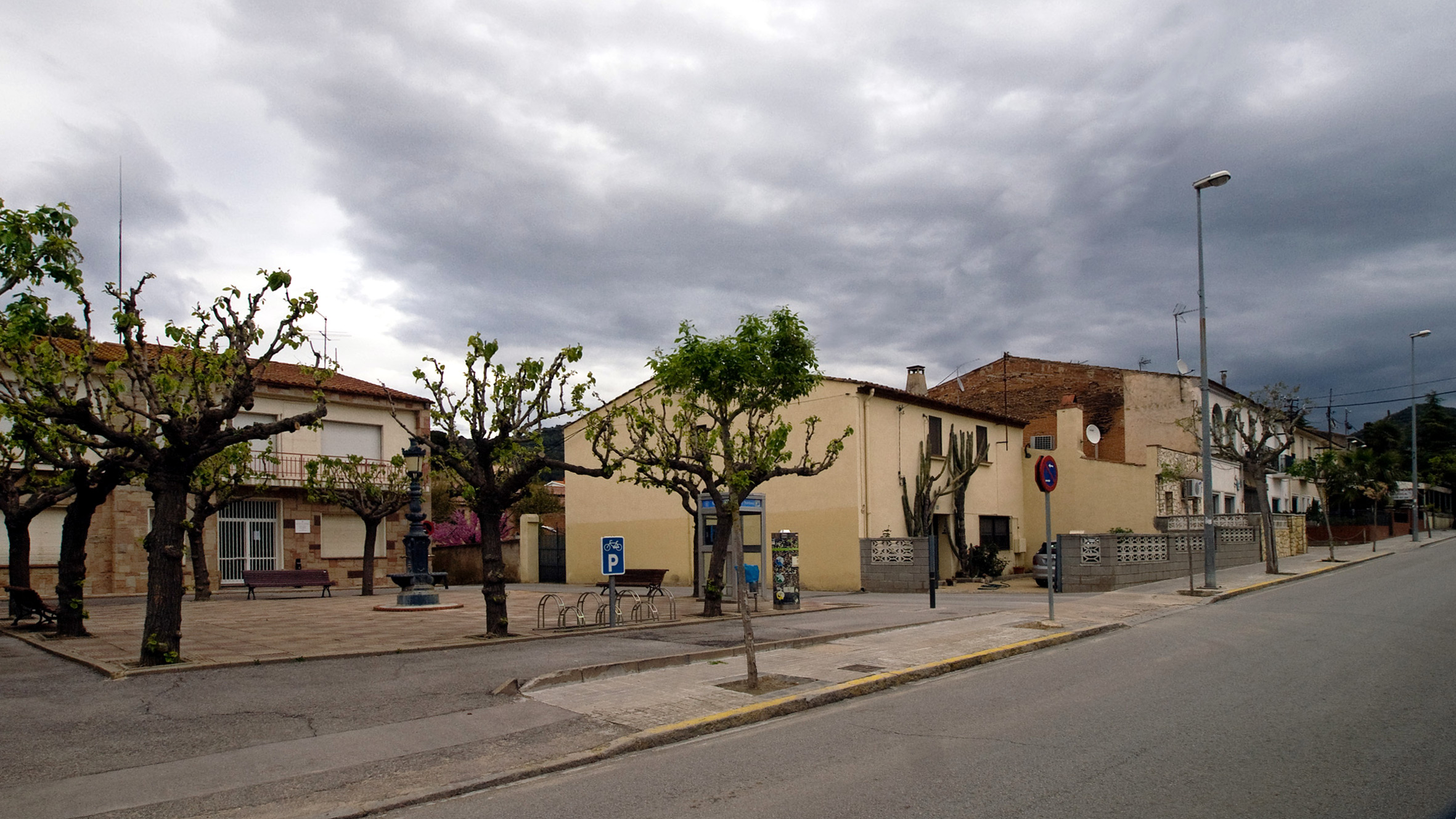
- Municipal council square

- Flag Coat of arms

- Location in Catalonia Martorelles (Spain)
- Coordinates: 41.53°N 2.239°E
- Country: Spain
- Community: Catalonia
- Province: Barcelona
- Comarca: Vallès Oriental

Government
  - Mayor: Marc Candela Callado (2015)

Area
  - Total: 3.6 km^{2} (1.4 sq mi)

Population (2025-01-01)
  - Total: 4,992
  - Density: 1,400/km^{2} (3,600/sq mi)
- Website: www.martorelles.cat

Martorelles (Catalan pronunciation: [məɾtuˈɾɛʎəs]) is a municipality in the province of Barcelona and autonomous community of Catalonia, Spain. It covers 3.6 square kilometres (1.4 sq mi). Its population in 2014 was 4,783.

It was in Martorelles that motorcycle ace Ricardo Tormo crashed and shattered his leg in 1984 during practice for a race, ending his career. A car entered the unrestricted area in a closed-off industrial estate where his Derbi team was practising, and Tormo ran into it.
