= Montornès del Vallès =

- Municipality
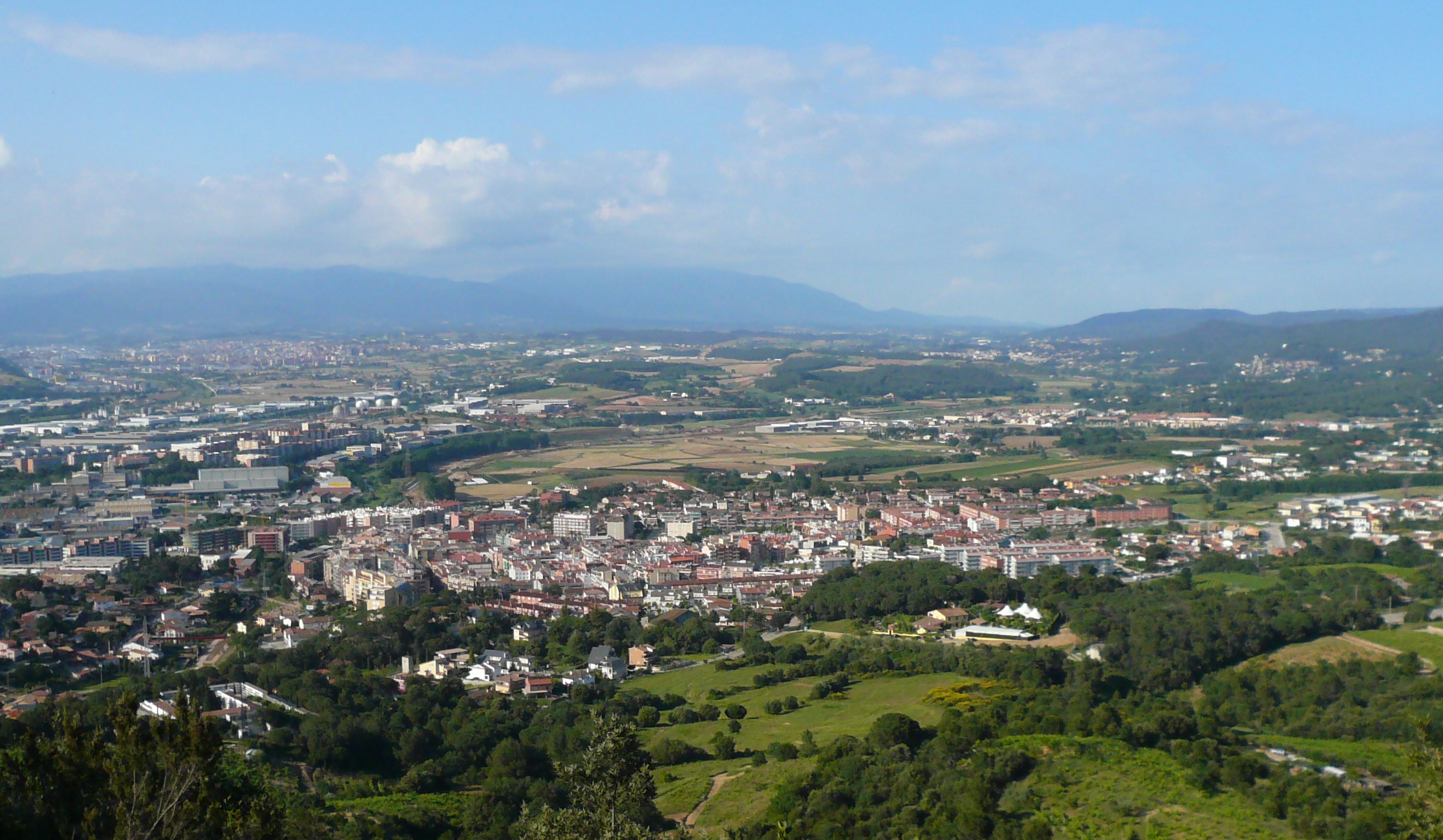
- Montornès

- Flag Coat of arms

- Location in Catalonia Montornès del Vallès (Spain)
- Coordinates: 41°32′N 2°16′E
- Country: Spain
- Community: Catalonia
- Province: Barcelona
- Comarca: Vallès Oriental

Government
  - Mayor: Jose Antonio Montero Dominguez (2015)

Area
  - Total: 10.2 km^{2} (3.9 sq mi)

Population (2025-01-01)
  - Total: 17,102
  - Density: 1,680/km^{2} (4,340/sq mi)
- Website: www.montornes.cat

Montornès del Vallès (Catalan pronunciation: [muntuɾˈnɛz ðəl βəˈʎɛs]) is a municipality in the province of Barcelona and autonomous community of Catalonia, Spain. The municipality covers an area of 10.2 square kilometres (3.9 sq mi) and the population in 2014 was 16,217.

== History ==
The Battle of Montornès was one of the battles of the Second War of the Remences, and occurred here on January 4, 1485. It pitted the Remensas headed by Pere Joan Sala against the army of the Diputació del General of Catalonia commanded by the Viceroy of Catalonia Pere Anton de Rocacrespa, resulting in a victory for the Remensas.
