= Vilanova del Vallès =

- Municipality
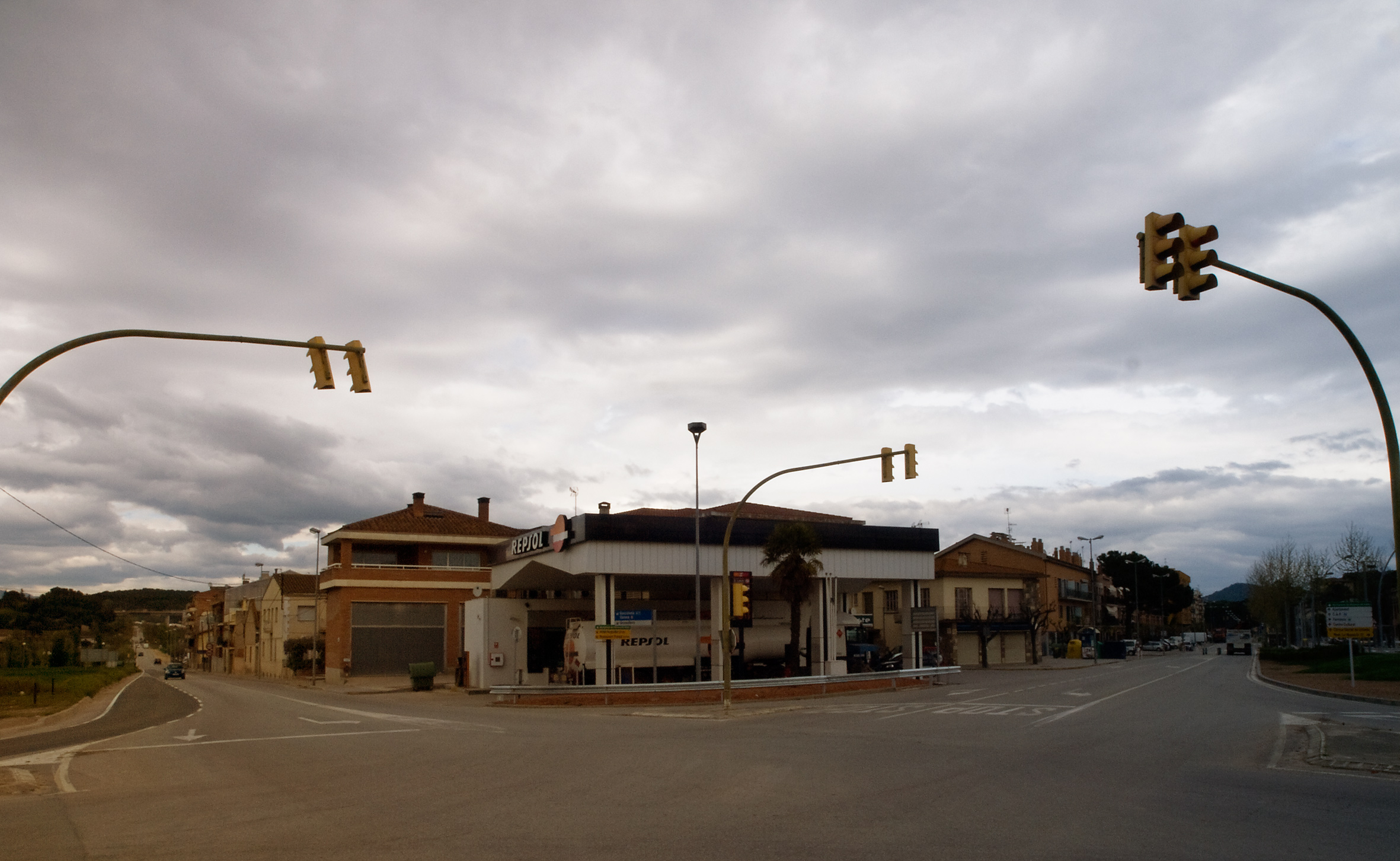
- Crossroads, Vilanova del Vallès

- Flag Coat of arms

- Location in Catalonia Vilanova del Vallès (Spain)
- Coordinates: 41°33′19″N 2°17′11″E
- Country: Spain
- Community: Catalonia
- Province: Barcelona
- Comarca: Vallès Oriental

Government
  - Mayor: Yolanda Lorenzo García (2015)

Area
  - Total: 15.2 km^{2} (5.9 sq mi)

Population (2025-01-01)
  - Total: 5,693
  - Density: 375/km^{2} (970/sq mi)
- Website: vilanovadelvalles.cat

Vilanova del Vallès (Catalan pronunciation: [ˌbiləˈnɔβə ðəl βəˈʎɛs]) is a village in the province of Barcelona and autonomous community of Catalonia, Spain. The municipality covers an area of 15.2 square kilometres (5.9 sq mi) and the population in 2014 was 5,250.
