= Montseny =

- Municipality
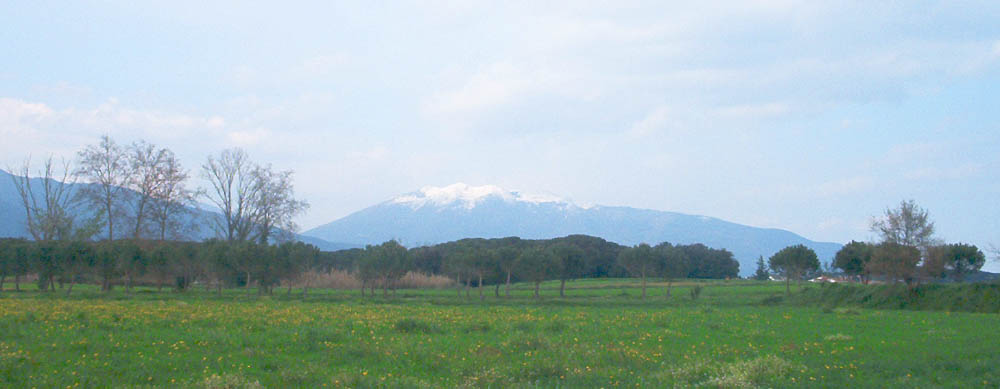
- Montseny seen from Cardedeu

- Coat of arms

- Location in Catalonia Montseny (Spain)
- Coordinates: 41.75°N 2.395°E
- Province: Barcelona
- Comarca: Vallès Oriental

Government
  - Mayor: Núria Masnou Pujol (2019)

Area
  - Total: 26.8 km^{2} (10.3 sq mi)
- Elevation: 528 m (1,732 ft)

Population (2025-01-01)
  - Total: 388
  - Density: 14.5/km^{2} (37.5/sq mi)
- Website: www.montseny.cat

Montseny (Catalan pronunciation: [munˈsɛɲ]) is a municipality and village in the Vallès Oriental comarca in Catalonia. As of 2014, the population was 332.

The village is at the feet of the Montseny Massif. The Montseny Natural Park inside the Montseny Massif was declared a Biosphere Reserve by UNESCO.
