= List of primary highways in Catalonia =

The network of primary highways (freeways or not) in Catalonia, Spain, can be divided into two groups: highways managed by the Spanish Government and highways managed by the Generalitat de Catalunya (Catalonia's Government).

The first group are itineraries included in the Red de Interés General del Estado (Spanish highways network), which generally either serve as long-distance connectors beyond the Catalonia's field or either have a special strategical importance. They are mainly autopistas (Catalan: autopistes) or autovías (Catalan: autovies) but some regular roads can also be found (most of them are in process or in prospect of being upgraded to autovía).

The second group are itineraries mainly used for Catalonia's internal transport. However, some of these highways (such as C-31, C-32 or C-58) are main communication paths and suffer from heavy traffic.

== Primary highways managed by the Spanish Government ==
The following highways (freeways or not) are managed by the Spanish Government. The list is arranged by itineraries, some of them formed by sections of different categories. The category field indicates if the sections are autopistas (generally tolled freeways under a concession contract), autovías or simple single-lane roads.

Signal	Denomination	Category	Itinerary (only sections inside Catalonia's territory are listed)
	Autovía A-2	autovía	Aragonese border - Lleida - Barcelona; Caldes de Malavella - Fornells de la Selva sections not upgraded to autovía keep the old name, N-II
	N-II	road	Barcelona - Caldes de Malavella; Fornells de la Selva - French border at La Jonquera future sections upgraded to autovía will be renamed to A-2
	Autopista AP-2; European route E90	autopista	El Vendrell (link with AP-7) - Lleida - Aragonese border
	Autovía A-7	autovía	L'Hospitalet de l'Infant - Vila-seca - Tarragona sections not upgraded to autovía keep the former name, N-340
	N-340	road	Valencian Community's border - Vila-seca; Tarragona - Vallirana future sections upgraded to autovía will be renamed to A-7
	Autopista del Mediterrani; European route E15	autopista	French border - Girona - Montmeló; Montmeló - El Papiol; El Papiol - Tarragona - Valencian Community's border
	Autovía A-14	autovía	in project: Lleida - Vielha - French border sections not upgraded to autovía keep the former name, N-230
	N-230	road	Lleida - Vielha - French border future sections upgraded to autovía will be renamed to A-14 some of this itinerary runs inside the Aragonese territory
	Autovía A-22	autovía	under construction: Lleida - Aragonese border
	N-240	road	Tarragona - Lleida; Lleida - Aragonese border
	Autovía A-26	autovía	Besalú - Olot in project: Figueres - Olot
	N-260	road	French border at Portbou - Besalú; Olot - Ripoll; Puigcerdà - El Pont de Suert - Aragonese border
	Autovía A-27	autovía	under construction: Tarragona - Montblanc
	Autovía A-34	autovía	L'Hospitalet de l'Infant-*-Vila-seca
	N-420	road	Reus - Aragonese border
	B-10 or Ronda Litoral	autovía	Barcelona's south-eastern ring road
	B-20 or Ronda de Dalt	autovía	Barcelona's north-western ring road Sant Boi de Llobregat - Montgat
	B-23	autopista	Barcelona - Molins de Rei (link with B-24)
	B-24	autovía	Molins de Rei (link with B-23) - Vallirana (link with N-340)
	B-30	autovía	AP-7's lateral road Barberà del Vallès - Rubí
	B-40 or Quart cinturó	autovía	under construction: Abrera - Terrassa in prospect: Terrassa - Granollers
	LL-11	autovía	Eastern access to Lleida
	LL-12	autovía	Southern access to Lleida
	T-11	autovía	Western access to Reus and Tarragona

== Primary highways managed by the Generalitat de Catalunya ==
The primary highways managed by the Catalan Government serve mainly for transport inside Catalonia.

Since year 2004, their denomination follows the next rules:

- The letter C before the hyphen (for example, C-31) means that the road is managed by the Generalitat de Catalunya
- The first number after the hyphen (for example, C-31) indicates the main bound:
  - 1 for south-northbound highways
  - 2 for west-eastbound highways
  - 3 for southwest-northeastbound highways
  - 4, 5 and 6 for southeast-northwestbound highways
- The second number after the hyphen (for example, C-31) indicates the ordinal number within the category indicated by the first number. For example, for south-northbound highways, the lowest number correspond to the westernmost highway, whereas the highest number is for the easternmost one.

=== South-Northbound highways ===
Signal	Denomination	Category	Itinerary
	C-12 or Eix Occidental	road	Amposta - Móra d'Ebre - Lleida - Balaguer - Àger
	C-13 or Eix del Pallars	road	Lleida - Esterri d'Àneu
	C-14 or Eix Tarragona-Andorra	autovia road	Salou - Reus - Alcover; Alcover - Montblanc - Tàrrega - La Seu d'Urgell
	C-15 or Eix Garraf-Anoia	road	Vilanova i la Geltrú - Igualada in prospect: upgrading of the Vilanova i la Geltrú-Vilafranca del Penedès section to autovia
	C-16 or Eix del Llobregat; European route E09	autopista autopista autovia road	Barcelona - Terrassa; Terrassa - Manresa; Manresa - Berga; Berga - Túnel del Cadí - Puigcerdà
	C-17 or Eix del Congost	autovia road	Barcelona - Vic; Vic - Ripoll (in process of being upgraded to autovia)

=== West-Eastbound highways ===
Signal	Denomination	Category	Itinerary
	C-25 or Eix Transversal	road	Cervera - Manresa - Vic - Santa Coloma de Farners - Girona in prospect: upgrading of the full itinerary to autovia
	C-26 or Eix Pre-Pirinenc	road	Alfarràs - Olot
	C-28	road	Vielha - Esterri d'Àneu

=== Southwest-Northeastbound highways ===
Signal	Denomination	Category	Itinerary
	C-31 or Eix Costaner	road autovia autopista road	El Vendrell - Vilanova i la Geltrú - Castelldefels; Castelldefels - Barcelona; Barcelona - Montgat; Santa Cristina d'Aro - Palamós - Torroella de Montgrí - Figueres under construction: parts of the last section are being upgraded to autovia
	C-32 or Corredor del Mediterrani	autopista autopista autovia autopista	El Vendrell - Castelldefels(Autopista Pau Casals or Túnels del Garraf); Castelldefels - Sant Boi de Llobregat some renamed sections of the B-20 in Cornellà de Llobregat; Montgat - Mataró - Palafolls (Autopista del Maresme) in project: Palafolls- Blanes stretch
	C-33	autopista	Barcelona - Montmeló
	C-35	road autovia	Parets del Vallès - Maçanet de la Selva; Maçanet de la Selva - Llagostera (link with C-65)
	C-37 or Eix Diagonal	road	Alcover - Valls - Igualada - Manresa - Olot
	C-38	road	Sant Joan de les Abadesses - Molló

toll road

=== Southeast-Northwestbound highways ===
Signal	Denomination	Category	Itinerary
	C-42	road	L'Aldea - Tortosa
	C-43	road	Benifallet - Gandesa
	C-44	road	L'Hospitalet de l'Infant - Móra la Nova
	C-45	road	Maials - Seròs
	C-51	road	El Vendrell - Valls
	C-53	road	Vilagrassa - Vallfogona de Balaguer
	C-55	road	Abrera - Solsona
	C-58	autopista road	Barcelona (connection with C-33) - Terrassa (link with C-16); Terrassa - Castellbell i el Vilar
	C-59	autovia road	Santa Perpètua de Mogoda - Palau-solità i Plegamans; Palau-solità i Plegamans - Santa Maria d'Oló
	C-60	autovia	Mataró - La Roca del Vallès
	C-61	road	Arenys de Mar - Sant Celoni
	C-63 or Eix Selva-Garrotxa	road	Lloret de Mar - Olot
	C-65	road autovia road	Sant Feliu de Guíxols - Santa Cristina d'Aro; Santa Cristina d'Aro - Llagostera (connection with C-35); Llagostera - Girona
	C-66	road autovia road	Palafrugell - Sarrià de Ter; Sarrià de Ter - Banyoles; Banyoles - Besalú in project: upgrading of the Banyoles-Besalú section to autovia
