= Autovía B-10 =

Ring road around Barcelona, Spain

Autovía B-10
- Ronda Litoral de Barcelona
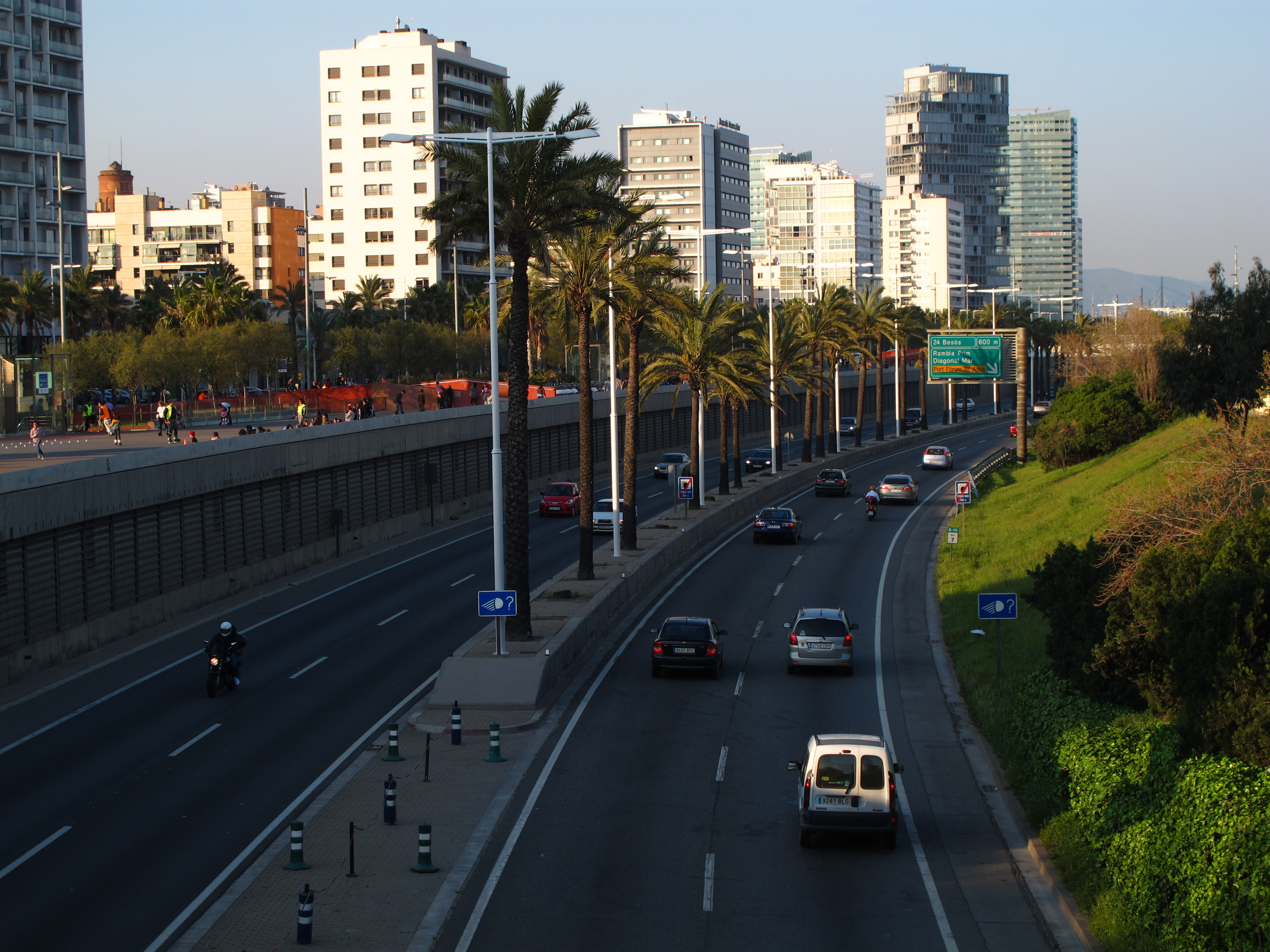

Route information
- Length: 20 km (12 mi)
- Existed: May 5, 1981–present

Major junctions
- North end: Nus de la Trinitat
- South end: Nus del Llobregat

Location
- Country: Spain
- Autonomous community: Catalonia
- Province: Barcelona

Highway system
- Highways in Spain; Autopistas and autovías; National Roads; Primary Highways in Catalonia

The B-10, also known as Ronda Litoral (Catalan: [ˈrondə lituˈɾal], Spanish: [ˈronda litoˈɾal]; English: Coastal Ring Road), is a 20-kilometre (12.43 mi) freeway in Catalonia, Spain partially encircling Barcelona passing through the eastern side of the city. It starts at Nus de la Trinitat interchange in northern Barcelona and runs along the entire length of the Besòs River and the city's coastline south to Nus del Llobregat interchange in Barcelona's southern suburbs, where it becomes the Autovía A-2. Both north and south end interchanges link the freeway to the B-20 or Ronda de Dalt, which encircles Barcelona passing through the western side, jointly forming a beltway commonly referred to as the rondes that surrounds the city.

The freeway features a mix of below-grade, at-grade and covered tunnel sections, mainly as it passes through central Barcelona, where it is only two lanes in each direction while the other sections are three lanes. It becomes a segregated urban highway as it passes through central and northern Barcelona so that all its signposting becomes green and is maintained by the Metropolitan Area of Barcelona. In contrast, the southern section of B-10 is considered to be part of European route E90 and is signposted in blue following the formal colour scheme for motorways since it serves as a continuation of the Autovía A-2. In addition, unlike the rest of the route, this section is named Cinturó Litoral and is maintained by the Spanish Government.

Although the speed limit is 80 km/h (50 mph) along the urban freeway section and 100 km/h (62 mph) along the interurban section, car's average top speed is lower due to traffic congestion as it serves as an arterial corridor to access Barcelona by road, and even average top speed may reach 20 km/h (12 mph) during rush hour. Additional restrictions for heavy goods vehicles are applied on the section situated between Montjuïc–Morrot and Rambla de Prim near Sant Adrià de Besòs, whereby weight limits is posted 12 tonnes and all vehicles over 12 meters long are banned from that section.

== Exit list ==
Exits on the rondes are numbered 1 to 30 anticlockwise from Nus de la Trinitat according to the beltway that Ronda Litoral (B-10) and Ronda de Dalt (B-20) freeways form around Barcelona so that exits on Ronda de Dalt are officially numbered 1 to 16 (southbound), while on Ronda Litoral are numbered 17 to 30 (northbound). Strangely enough, while the entire urban highway section follows the exit numbering scheme of the rondes, the interurban section that is maintained by the Spanish Government does not and exits on this section are numbered 13 to 19 following its own scheme. In addition, route markers are placed north–south in relation to Nus de la Trinitat, where the road's "Kilometre Zero" is placed, on the contrary of the exits' numbering.

| Municipality | km | Mile | Exit | Name | Destinations | Notes |
|---|---|---|---|---|---|---|
| Barcelona–Santa Coloma de Gramenet | 0.0 | 0.0 | Nus de la Trinitat | | | |
| Barcelona–Santa Coloma de Gramenet | 0.4– 1.0 | 0.2– 0.6 | 30 | Bon Pastor | Santa Coloma de Gramenet, Potosí Street | |
| Sant Adrià de Besòs | 2.2 | 1.3 | 29 | Verneda | Sant Adrià de Besòs, Guipúscoa Street | Northbound exit is via exit 26 (km 3.8) |
| Sant Adrià de Besòs | 2.7 | 1.6 | 28 | Gran Via | C-31 south – Plaça de les Glòries Catalanes | No northbound exit |
| Sant Adrià de Besòs | 3.0 | 1.8 | 27 | Badalona | C-31 north – Badalona, Mataró | Indirect access to Carretera Nacional N-II |
| Sant Adrià de Besòs | 3.8 | 2.3 | 26 | Sant Adrià | Cristòfol de Moura Street, La Catalana Neighbourhood | Northbound exit only; southbound exit is via exit 29 |
| Sant Adrià de Besòs | 3.9 | 2.4 | 26 | Sant Adrià | La Mina Neighbourhood, La Catalana Neighbourhood, Llull Street | Southbound exit only; northbound exit is via exit 25 |
| Sant Adrià de Besòs | 4.3 | 2.6 | 24 | Diagonal Mar | Rambla de Prim, Passeig de Garcia Fària, Sant Adrià de Besòs | Southbound exit only; northbound exit is via exit 24 named "Besòs" |
| Sant Adrià de Besòs | 4.7 | 2.9 | 25 | Port Fòrum Sant Adrià | Eduard Maristany Avenue | Northbound exit only; southbound exit is via exit 26 (km 3.9) |
| Barcelona | 6.0 | 3.7 | 24 | Besòs | Rambla de Prim, Diagonal Mar, Port Fòrum Sant Adrià | Northbound exit; southbound exit is via exit 24 named "Diagonal Mar" |
| Barcelona | 7.4 | 4.5 | 23 | Poblenou | Marina, Port Olímpic, Parc del Mar | Northbound exit is via exit 22 (km 9.5) |
| Barcelona | 7.9 | 4.9 | 23 | Poblenou | Bac de Roda Street, Avinguda Litoral | No southbound exit |
| Barcelona | 9.0 | 5.5 | 22 | Barceloneta | Pla de Palau, Via Laietana, Port Vell | |
| Barcelona | 9.5 | 5.9 | 22 | Barceloneta | Marina, Port Olímpic, Hospital del Mar, Parc del Mar | Southbound exit is via exit 23 (km 7.4) |
| Barcelona | 10.7 | 5.9 | 21 | Ciutat Vella | Paral·lel Street, Ciutat Vella, Port Vell, Estació Marítima Balears | Northbound exit via the other exit numbered 21 |
| Barcelona | 11.0 | 5.9 | 20 | Port | Port – Mercaderies | |
| Barcelona | 11.6 | 5.9 | 21 | Ciutat Vella | Paral·lel Street, La Rambla, Montjuïc, Port Vell | |
| Barcelona | South end of the urban highway section | | | | | |
| Barcelona | 13.4 | 5.9 | 13 | | Montjuïc, Passeig de Cantunis, Montjuïc Cemetery, Anella Olímpica | |
| Barcelona | | | 14 | | Zona Franca, Mercabarna, Passeig de Zona Franca, Port | |
| Barcelona | | | 17 | | C-31 north – Gran Via de les Corts Catalanes; Zona Franca, Can Tunis Freight Station | |
| Barcelona | | | 18B | | Zona Franca – 3rd Street | |
| Barcelona | | | 18A | | Zona Franca, Mercabarna, Logistics Area (Z.A.L.) | |
| L'Hospitalet de Llobregat | | | 18 | | C-31 south – El Prat de Llobregat, Castelldefels, Barcelona–El Prat Airport | |
| L'Hospitalet de Llobregat | | | 19 | | B-20 north (Ronda de Dalt) – Barcelona; B-20 / C-32 – El Prat de Llobregat, Castelldefels | |
1.000 mi = 1.609 km; 1.000 km = 0.621 mi: Incomplete access

== See also ==
- B-20 motorway (Spain)
- Street names in Barcelona
- Urban planning of Barcelona
