= Trinitat Vella station =

Metro station in Barcelona, Spain

Coordinates: 41°26′56″N 2°11′37″E

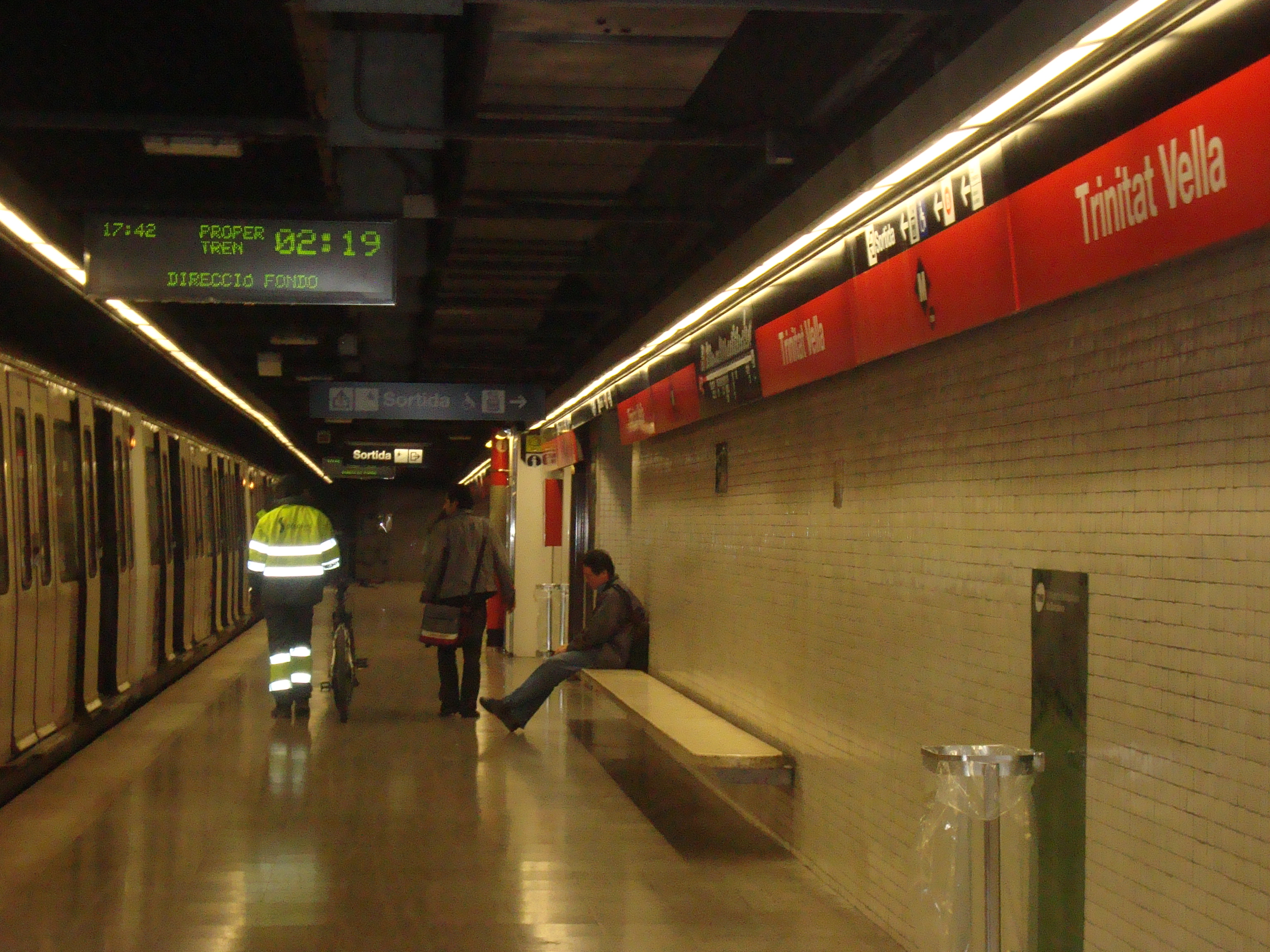
Station platform

Trinitat Vella (Catalan pronunciation: [tɾiniˈtad ˈbeʎə]) is a station in the Barcelona metro network, currently served by the TMB-operated L1. It's named after the neighbourhood Trinitat Vella, in the Sant Andreu district of Barcelona, and the park of the same name. It is quite unusual in being one of the few stations with an attached building overground, which lies on the Nus de la Trinitat and links the neighbourhood with Parc de la Trinitat.

It was opened in 1983, when the line was extended from Torras i Bages towards Santa Coloma de Gramenet (Santa Coloma (Barcelona Metro)), and rebuilt in 1992. It can be accessed from Via Barcino and from the park.

== Services ==
Preceding station	Metro	Following station
Torras i Bages towards Hospital de Bellvitge	L1	Baró de Viver towards Fondo
