= Autovia C-35 =

Highway in Catalonia, Spain

Autovía C-35

Major junctions
- From: Autovia C-65
- To: Maçanet de la Selva

Location
- Country: Spain

Highway system
- Highways in Spain; Autopistas and autovías; National Roads

The C-35 is a highway in Catalonia, Spain. It connects the Costa Brava with the Autopista AP-7 to Barcelona.

The road starts at the junction with the Autovia C-65 and then heads west to the south of Llagostera to Vidreres. This section is being upgraded to Autovia standard. After junctions with the N-II and AP-7 (junction 9) the road follows the river valley below the Montseny Range passing through Maçanet de la Selva, Hostalric, Breda, Sant Celoni before ending at junction 12 of the AP-7 and the Autovia C-60. The C-35 will be part of the Eix Maçanet-Platja d'Aro, with Autovia C-65 and Autovia C-31.
