= Baró de Viver station =

Metro station in Barcelona, Spain

Coordinates: 41°26′54″N 2°12′1″E

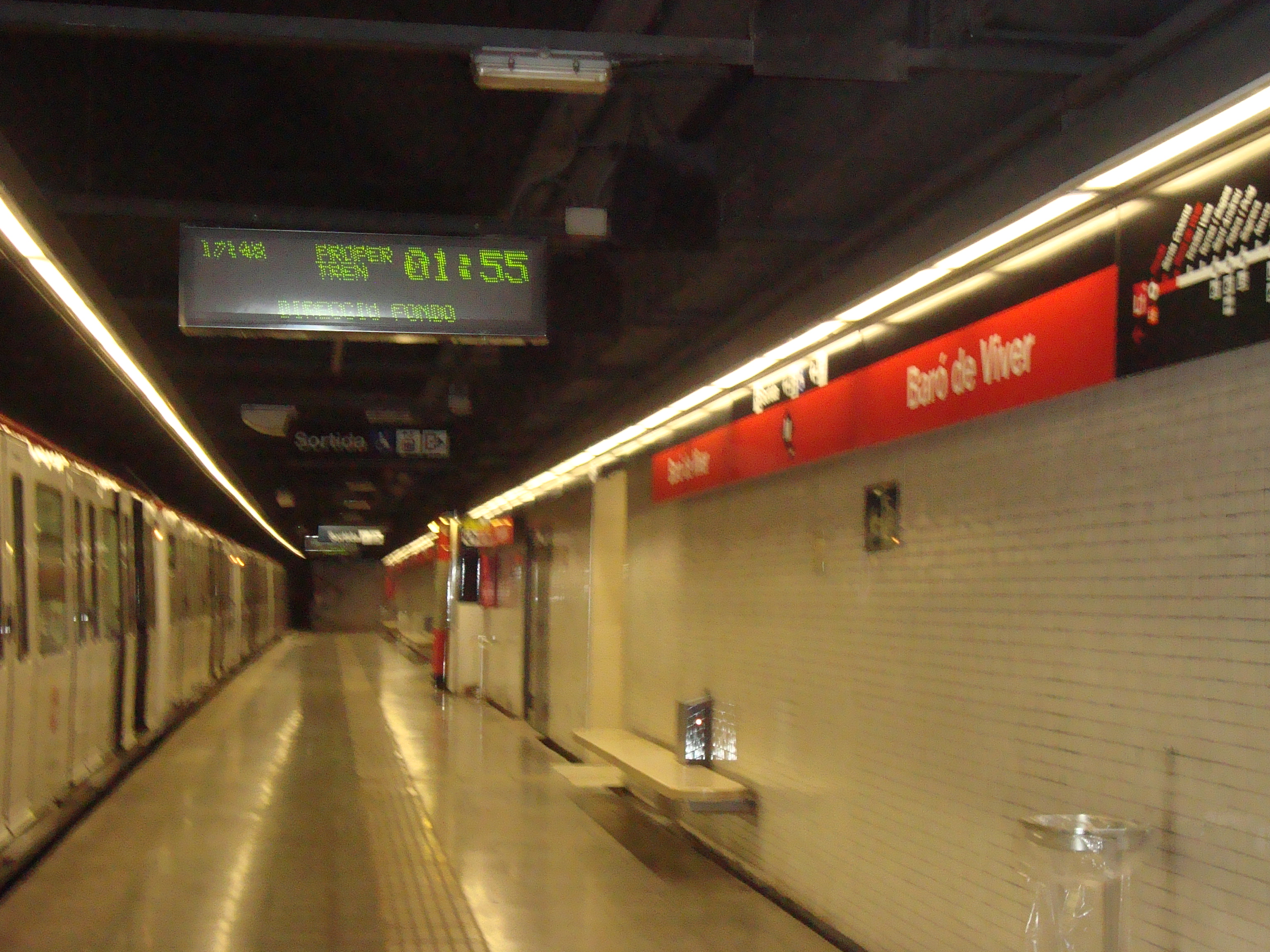
Baró de Viver station platform

Baró de Viver (Catalan pronunciation: [bəˈɾo ðə βiˈβe]) is a station of the Barcelona Metro, in the Baró de Viver area of Sant Andreu, a northern district of Barcelona. It is operated by Transports Metropolitans de Barcelona (TMB) and served by L1 (red line). The station opened in 1983 as the line grew from its terminus in Torras i Bages towards the municipality of Santa Coloma de Gramenet. It is located under the southern side of the busy Nus de la Trinitat, next to the Besòs river bank.

== Services ==
Preceding station	Metro	Following station
Trinitat Vella towards Hospital de Bellvitge	L1	Santa Coloma towards Fondo

== See also ==
- List of Barcelona Metro stations
