= Ronda del Mig =

Ronda del Mig is an expressway that runs through the city of Barcelona through the interior of the city, unlike the Ronda del Litoral and the Ronda de Dalt, which runs along the periphery. It was originally called the "Primer Cinturó de Ronda".

It was initially planned in the Barcelona link plan of 1907, the work of the urban planner Léon Jaussely, although its execution, with important modifications, has been extended almost all the twentieth century.

In the planning of the city council in the decade of 1970, its continuity was anticipated from the Guinardó, where it finishes at the moment, until the sea, happening through the Sagrera and the present Rambla de Prim.

== See also ==
- Street names in Barcelona
- Urban planning of Barcelona
