= C58 =

C58 or C-58 may refer to:

- C-58 (Michigan county highway)
- C-58 highway (Spain)
- ARM General Pedro María Anaya (C58), an Admirable-class minesweeper of the Mexican Navy
- Caldwell 58, an open cluster
- Choriocarcinoma
- Douglas C-58 Bolo, an American military aircraft
- HMS Fiji (C58), a Fiji-class light cruiser of the Royal Navy
- JNR Class C58, a Japanese steam locomotive
- Minimum Age (Sea) Convention (Revised), 1936 of the International Labour Organization
- Two Knights Defense, a chess opening
