= Autopista B-23 =

Spanish mototway

Autovía B-23
- Accés a Barcelona centre

Route information
- Part of E90
- Maintained by Ministerio de Fomento
- Length: 15.5 km (9.6 mi)

Major junctions
- From: Avinguda Diagonal, Barcelona
- To: Autopista AP-7

Location
- Country: Spain
- Autonomous community: Catalonia
- Province: Barcelona

Highway system
- Highways in Spain; Autopistas and autovías; National Roads; Primary Highways in Catalonia

The Autopista B-23 or Accés a Barcelona centre is a Spanish motorway that goes from Avinguda Diagonal, in Barcelona City, with the AP-7. It is located in Catalonia and has a length of 15.5 kilometres (9.6 mi). It is part of the European route E90.

The autopista starts in the Avinguda Diagonal, at Les Corts district. Then it continues crossing the towns of Esplugues de Llobregat, Sant Just Desvern, Sant Joan Despí and Sant Feliú de Llobregat. Then it continues parallel to Llobregat River and A-2, and surrounds Molins de Rei and El Papiol before joining to AP-7.
