= Sant Pol de Mar bus crash =

2009 motor vehicle incident in Spain

Coordinates: 41°36′21″N 2°36′31″E

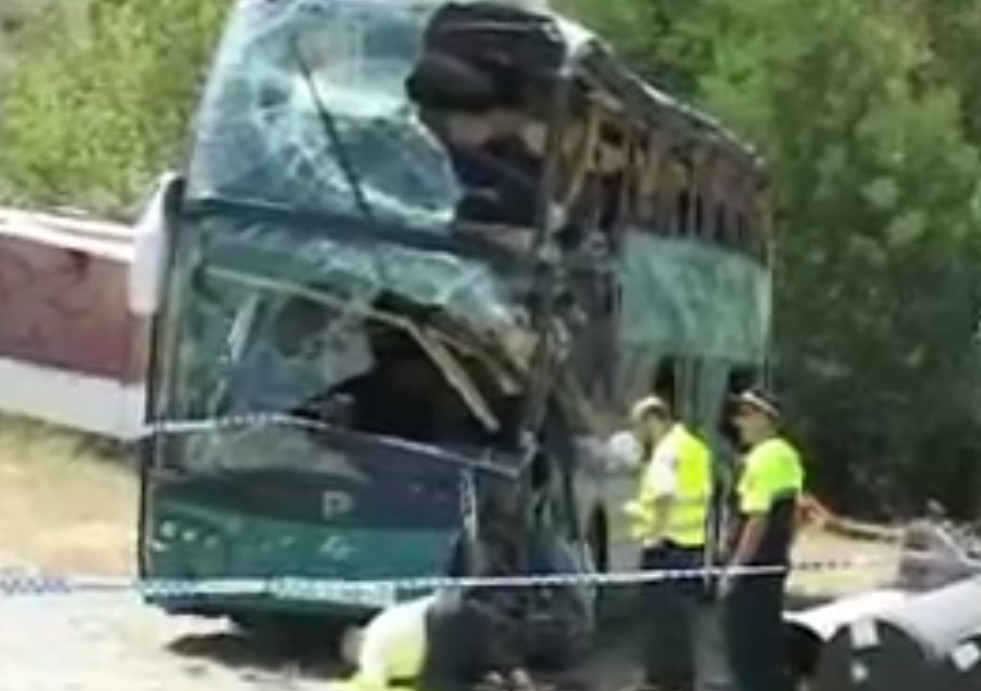
- The bus after the crash

Details
- Date: 31 July 2009
- Location: Sant Pol de Mar, Catalonia, Spain

Statistics
- Deaths: 6
- Injured: 36

The Sant Pol de Mar bus crash was a traffic accident which occurred on the evening of 30 July 2009 in Sant Pol de Mar, near Barcelona, in north-eastern Spain. A double-decker bus carrying Dutch tourists left the highway on a bend at the exit for the town, hit a car and a metal crash barrier and overturned. Six Dutch tourists were killed and between 36 and 44 people, including the driver, were injured, some seriously.

== Background ==
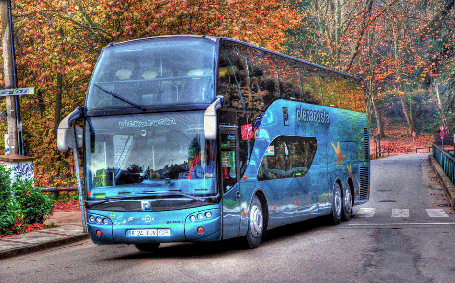
The bus involved seen in Madrid a year before

The bus carried 65 Dutch tourists, most on holidays booked through Sundio Group of Rotterdam, who had been visiting Barcelona for the day and were returning to hotels in Lloret de Mar and Blanes on the Costa Brava. The bus was locally hired, with a Spanish driver; there was a Dutch tour guide on board.

== Crash ==
The crash occurred at around 11.10PM (2110 UTC) when the bus left the C-32 highway at the Sant Pol de Mar exit. It left the road, colliding with a metal crash barrier, crossed into the opposite lane where it hit a car a glancing blow, and overturned. The injured were taken to several hospitals in the Barcelona area. Six people were killed and as many as 44 injured, some seriously. Most of those killed and seriously injured were sitting near the windows on the left, the side onto which the bus turned over, or on the upper deck of the double-decker bus. Initial reports were that eight had died.

== Cause ==
Manager Pere Artau from the bus firm, Plenacosta, said the driver had been working for the company for over sixteen years and passed a breath test for alcohol. The bus was two years old and conformed to safety regulations.

After an inquiry, the Mossos d'Esquadra (the Catalan police) announced that the bus had been travelling at 73 kilometres per hour (45 mph) entering the curve, where the speed limit was 40 kilometres per hour (25 mph); the driver had taken the wrong exit, and so the curve was sharper than he expected. The exit he was to have taken, for Santa Susanna, had a speed limit of 80 kilometres per hour (50 mph). Also, as noted after the accident, most of the passengers were not wearing their seat belts as required by Spanish law; this included all the dead and most of the seriously injured.

== Reaction ==
The accident was covered by news organisations around the globe, including in Australia, Canada, China, France, India, Ireland, South Africa, Thailand, the United Arab Emirates, and the United Kingdom. The Dutch Minister of Justice Ernst Hirsch Ballin and the Belgian Minister of Foreign Affairs Yves Leterme sent condolences.
