= Palau Sacosta Castle =

Castle in Catalonia

- Palau Castell de Sacosta (in Catalan)
- Girona, Catalonia, Spain
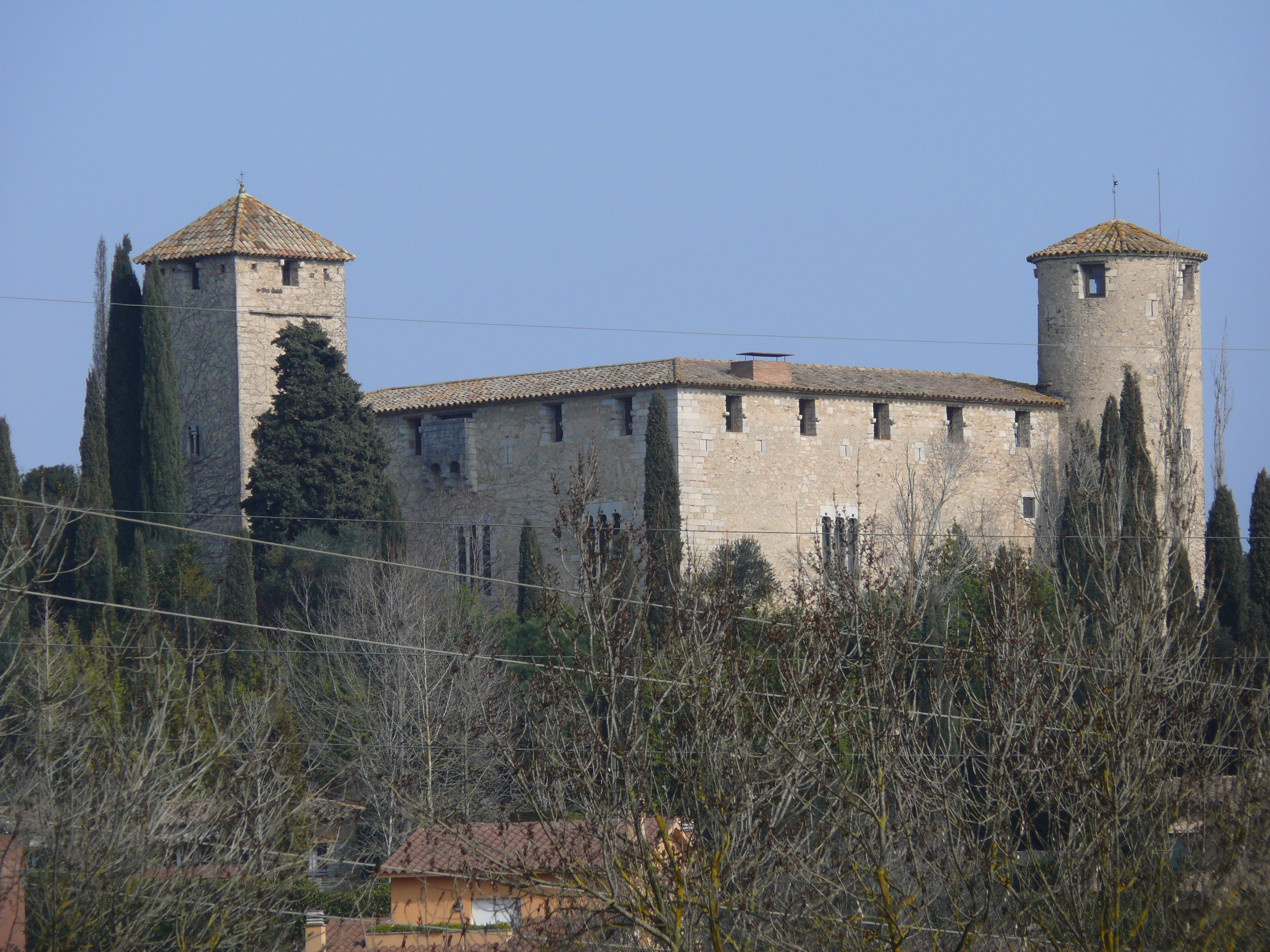

Site information
- Type: Castle
- Open to the public: no

Location
- Coordinates: 41°57′19.50″N 2°49′28.41″E

Site history
- Built: 1495
- Built by: Joan Sarriera

The Palau Sacosta Castle (Catalan: Palau Castell de Sacosta) is situated just southeast of Girona, Catalonia in the adjoining village of Palau-sacosta. Palau-sacosta was an independent municipality until 1962 when it was incorporated into Girona.

== History ==
The castle was built as a protective fortress for the town of Palau-sacosta. The main structure appears to have been constructed in 1495 by Joan Sarriera, although portions of the castle (namely one of the towers) have been dated to the 13th century. The current owner is the Marquis de Montoliu. Hebrew tombstones have been found near the castle grounds indicating the presence of the Jewish cemetery which is typical given that Girona had one of the largest Jewish communities in Spain prior to 1492. Roman road markers have also been unearthed within the vicinity.

== Architecture ==
While following an overall square layout with an interior courtyard, the tower has two signature towers; one square, the other round which are both viewable from the N-II motorway that runs to the south of the castle. The towers are what contribute to the castle's other name of 'les Torres de Palau' which literally means 'the towers of Palau' in Catalan. The interior is simple in form with vaulted arch ceilings and arched stone passageways between the rooms. Everything within the castle is in a very well preserved state.
