= Parets =

Parets may refer to:

- Parets del Vallès, a town in Spain
- Perez (son of Judah), a figure in the Book of Genesis
