= N-260 road (Spain) =

National road in Spain

National road N-260
- Carretera nacional N-260
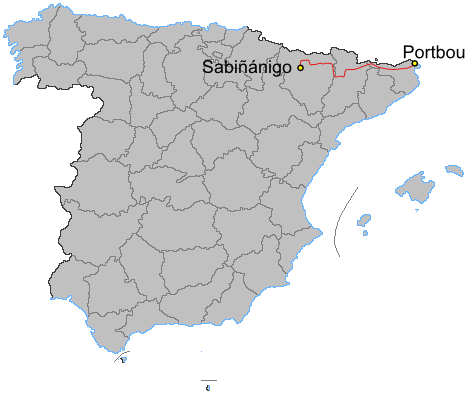

Major junctions
- From: French border (Portbou)
- To: Sabiñánigo

Location
- Country: Spain

Highway system
- Highways in Spain; Autopistas and autovías; National Roads

The N-260, also known as Eje Pirenaico (Pyrenaean Axis), is the northernmost east–west national road in Spain.

In contrast to the majority of Spanish national roads, which were specially constructed during the mid-20th century, the path for this highway was established at 80's decade over several previously existing secondary (or even local) roads. This fact, along with the mountainous characteristics of the eastern Pyrenees regions it crosses, is the consequence of several stretches being uneven and narrow paths with features further from the modern standard national roads. A bypass was built north of Olot in the 1990s.

The N-260 is in process of being upgraded to the A-26 autovía.

These are the sections of the N-260 road:

Section	Stretch	Notes
French border (near Portbou) - Ripoll	French border - Figueres	
French border (near Portbou) - Ripoll	Figueres - Olot	This stretch is a part of the former C-260 road between Roses and Olot (the Roses-Figueres section is still named C-260); The Besalú-Olot stretch has been recently upgraded to the A-26 autovía; The Figueres-Besalú stretch is in process of being upgraded to the A-26 autovía
French border (near Portbou) - Ripoll	Olot - Ripoll	This stretch is an old, narrow and uneven road which became outdated with the recent upgrading of the nearby C-26 road (Olot-Camprodon-Ripoll section), and specially with the opening of the Collabós tunnel.
Ripoll - Puigcerdà path: The ending of the first section at Ripoll and the beginning of the second section at Puigcerdà are connected via the N-152 road, which passes over the Collada de Tosas (1,800m).
Puigcerdà - El Pont de Suert	Puigcerdà - La Seu d'Urgell	Following the upper Segre river valley
Puigcerdà - El Pont de Suert	La Seu d'Urgell - Sort	This hilly and narrow stretch passes over Port del Cantó (1,725 m) and is in process of being upgraded
Puigcerdà - El Pont de Suert	Sort - La Pobla de Segur	Part of the former C-147 road (the other parts of this road were recently renamed to C-13) which follows the Noguera Pallaresa river valley
Puigcerdà - El Pont de Suert	La Pobla de Segur - El Pont de Suert	passing over Coll de Creu de Perves (1,325 m)
At El Pont de Suert: The ending of the second section and the beginning of the third are separated a few km but connected by the N-230 road.
El Pont de Suert - Sabiñánigo	N-230 - Castejón de Sos	passing over Coll de Espina (1,407 m) and Coll de Fadas (1,470 m)
El Pont de Suert - Sabiñánigo	Castejón de Sos - Campo	following the Congosto de Ventamillo and the valley of the Esera river
El Pont de Suert - Sabiñánigo	Campo - Aínsa	passing over the Collado de Foradada (1,020m)
El Pont de Suert - Sabiñánigo	Aínsa - Fiscal	Recently upgraded stretch
El Pont de Suert - Sabiñánigo	Fiscal - Broto	Old narrow uneven road which follows the Ara river valley
El Pont de Suert - Sabiñánigo	Broto - Biescas	Passing over the Puerto de Cotefablo pass (1,425m)
El Pont de Suert - Sabiñánigo	Biescas - Sabiñánigo	Following the Tena river valley
At Sabiñánigo: the road ends at the intersection with N-330 road.
