= Autopista C-33 =

Highway in Spain

Autopista C-33
- Autopista Barcelona-Montmeló
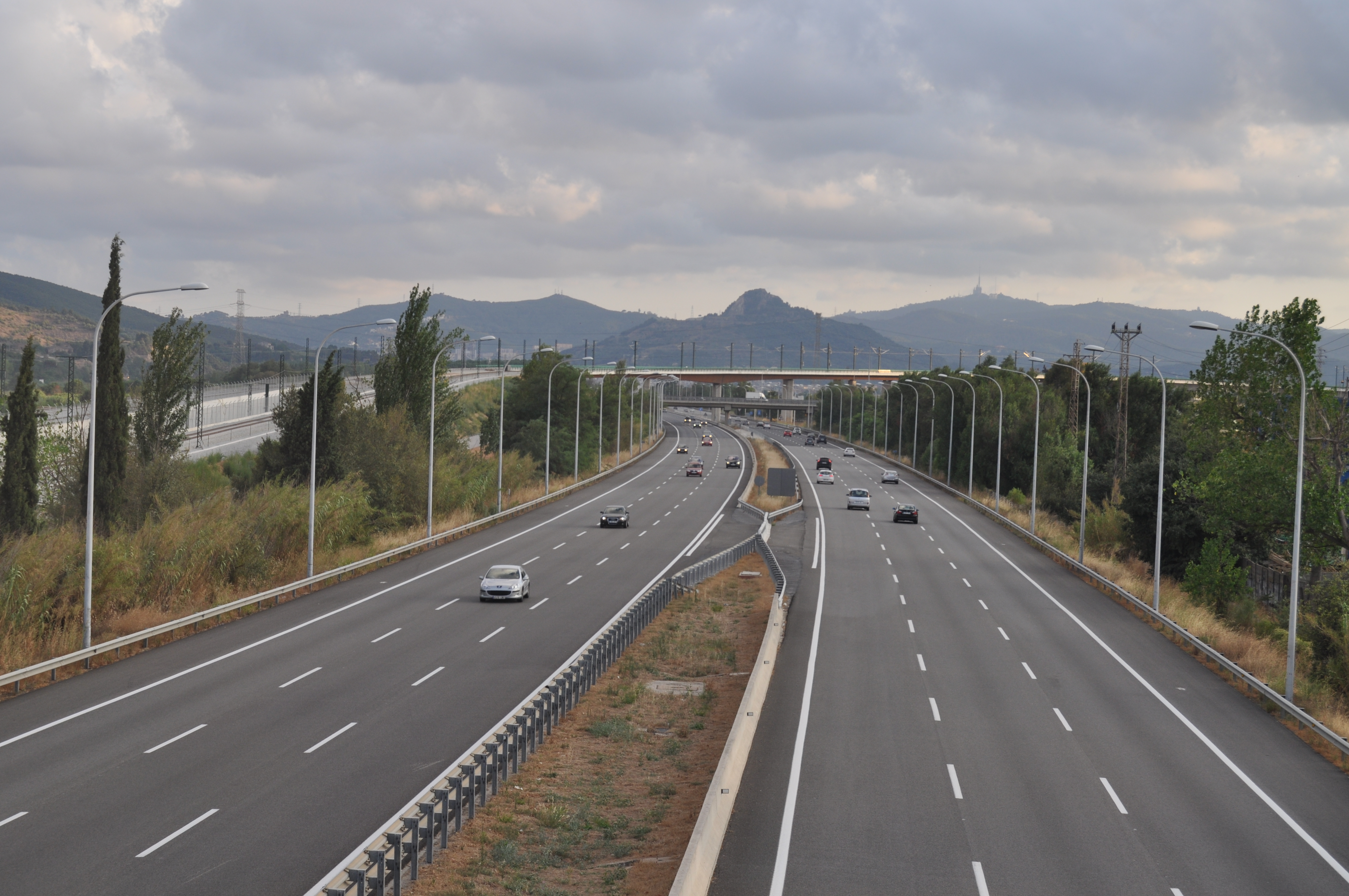

Route information
- Length: 15 km (9.3 mi)

Major junctions
- From: Barcelona
- To: Montmeló

Location
- Country: Spain

Highway system
- Highways in Spain; Autopistas and autovías; National Roads

The Autopista C-33 is a highway in Catalonia.

It connects the Autopista AP-7 north of Barcelona to the City Centre and the Autovía C-17.

For the 1992 Summer Olympics when the highway was known as A-17, it was used as part of the road team time trial cycling event that started and ended at the Circuit de Catalunya.
