= Autovía A-19 =

Road in Catalonia

Autovía A-19
- Autopista del Maresme

Route information
- Length: 66 km (41 mi)

Major junctions
- From: Barcelona
- To: Palafolls

Location
- Country: Spain

Highway system
- Highways in Spain; Autopistas and autovías; National Roads

The Autovía A-19, named Autopista del Maresme, was a highway in Catalonia. In 1995, the road was renamed Autopista C-32 and comprises a motorway built along the coast south from Barcelona via Castelldefels, Sitges, and Vilanova i la Geltrú.

There are a series of tunnels such Garraf. The road has tolls.
