= Autovía A-26 =

Motorway from Olot to Figueras (Spain)

Autovía A-26

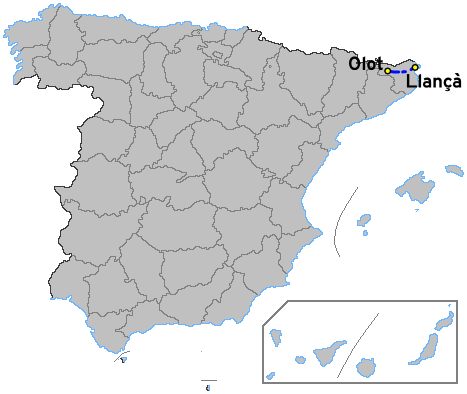

Route information
- Length: 21 km (13 mi)

Major junctions
- From: Besalú
- To: Olot

Location
- Country: Spain

Highway system
- Highways in Spain; Autopistas and autovías; National Roads

Autovía A-26 (Spanish: Autovía del Eje Pirenaico, Catalan: Autovia del Eix Pirenenc) is a long-term project of the Spanish government to upgrade the N-260 national road, also known as Eje Pirenaico (in Spanish) or Eix Pirenenc (in Catalan).

When finished, it will be the northernmost east–west highway in Spain and will connect the French border (near Portbou) with Sabiñánigo (northern Aragón), following the southern foothills of the eastern Pyrenees and passing over relevant towns such as Figueres, Olot, Ripoll, Puigcerdà or La Seu d'Urgell.

At the moment, there is only one section constructed between Besalú and Olot, both municipalities of the comarca of La Garrotxa (Catalonia, Spain), but a second section between Figueres and Besalú is about to be started shortly. The construction of a third section between Figueres and Llançà has been recently approved by the Spanish government.

== See also ==
- List of autopistas and autovías in Spain
- List of primary highways in Catalonia
