= Parets del Vallès =

- Municipality
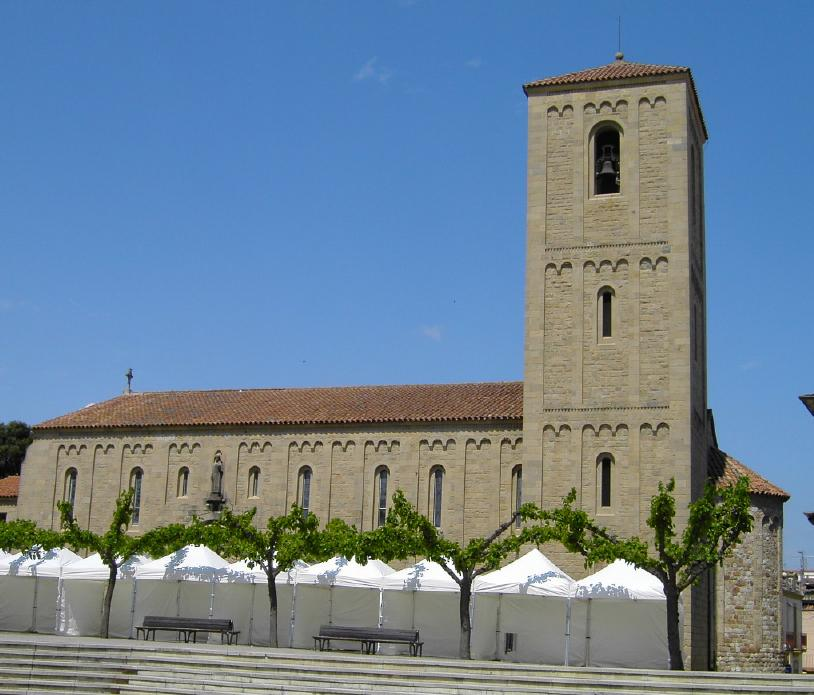
- Sant Esteve's church in Parets del Vallès

- Flag Coat of arms

- Location in Catalonia Parets del Vallès (Spain)
- Coordinates: 41.584°N 2.239°E
- Country: Spain
- Community: Catalonia
- Province: Barcelona
- Comarca: Vallès Oriental

Government
  - Mayor: Francesc Juzgado Mollá (2021)

Area
  - Total: 9.1 km^{2} (3.5 sq mi)

Population (2025-01-01)
  - Total: 18,885
  - Density: 2,100/km^{2} (5,400/sq mi)
- Website: parets.cat

Parets del Vallès (Catalan pronunciation: [pəˈɾɛdz ðəl βəˈʎɛs]) is a municipality situated 23 km north of Barcelona, in Catalonia, Spain, in the south-west of the comarca of Vallès Oriental, and 7 km from its capital Granollers. It covers an area of 8,98 km^{2}, and has approx. 19,000 inhabitants. From north to south, the town is crossed by the Tenes river. The population is spread over six areas: Barri Antic (Catalan for "old quarter"), on top of the hill surrounding the church; Eixample ("extension"), the most densely populated, laid out in the 1930s; Escorxador ("slaughterhouse"); Can Cerdanet; Can Volart; and Can Riera (these last three named after the farms in those areas). The municipality includes a small exclave to the north-west.

== History ==
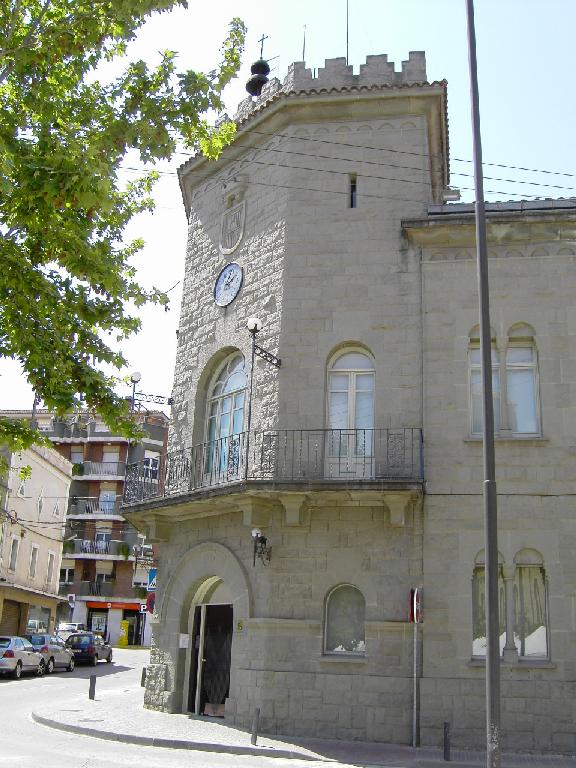
Town hall

The first documented reference to this town is from the year 878, but the first time the name Parets was used was in 904 (vila Parietes). The modern place name comes from the 12th century, probably due to some ancient walls of Roman origin found nearby. (Parets means "walls" in Catalan.)

Parets was under the direct jurisdiction of the King (Peter IV of Aragon), except for a brief period in 1383 when the Infante John (later John I of Aragon) sold it to Marc de Planella. The jurisdiction was returned to the King in 1385 by the wife of Bernat Planella. To prevent this from happening again, Parets was officially made a street of Barcelona in 1386.

As of 1385, Parets, Mollet and Gallecs were part of the same municipality. Parets became independent from the rest in the mid-19th century. The town has seen good and bad times during its thousand-year history: the dark times of the 14th and 15th centuries, the small increase in population during the 17th century, or the thriving 18th century. However, in that same century, in 1706, the troops of King Philip V of Spain burnt down the parish church, and with it the town archive of Parets. This is why much of the town's earlier history is unknown.

== Industry ==
Parets del Vallès is in a good location, with excellent connections with the rest of Spain and Europe, hence it has attracted commerce and industry. Parets is one of the most important industrial centres of the comarca (about 5,000 workers). Most of those who work in Parets are employed by small or medium-sized companies, but major firms (for example Danone, Nutrexpa, Grupo Zeta, Fujifilm, Freudenberg, Grifols, Solvay, and Novartis) are represented.

There are five industrial estates, mainly to the west of the Tenes river: Llevant, Can Volart, Eixample Industrial, Sector Mollet and Sector Autopista. The total area comes to 199 Ha.

== Natural spaces ==
Parets has an important forest and agricultural area shared among seven municipalities: Santa Maria de Gallecs. This area has been saved from new housing development – paradoxically, this was because it had already been ear-marked for housing, though this never came to fruition. Now, Gallecs has been officially recognised as an important nature reserve and several activities are undertaken to preserve it from the constant threat of building development.

Gallecs, along with the forest of Torre d'en Malla, Can Serra, the Tenes river, the Seca stream, and the biological corridor between these two streams, constitute a network of natural spaces deserving special attention, as it is one of the few in the comarca big enough to support natural systems.

== Connections ==
Parets has good transport connections. Two important traffic arteries pass through the municipality: the AP-7 Motorway and the C-17 highway (formerly N-152), as well as local roads. The Renfe railway lines from Barcelona to Vic and Puigcerdà call at Parets, and several bus services connect Parets to Barcelona and other town, in addition to local bus services within the town.

== Weather ==
Parets has a coastal Mediterranean climate. Temperature is moderate (average going from 7 °C to 9 °C in winter and from 22 °C to 25 °C in summer).

== Places of interest ==
=== Torre de Cellers ===
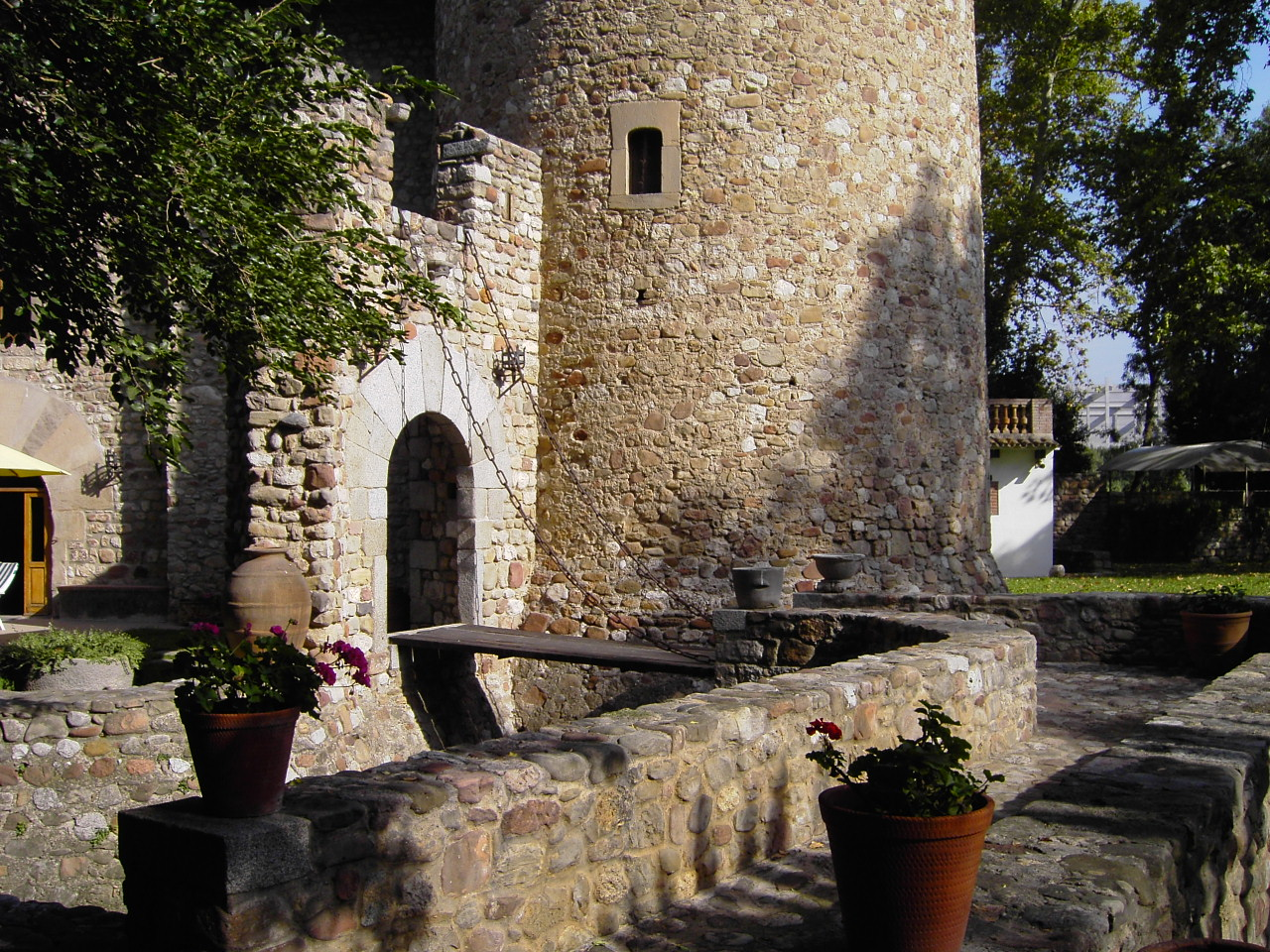
Entrance of Torre de Cellers

This is a fortified farmhouse situated between the rivers Tenes and Besòs, and probably built on the site of an ancient Roman villa named Villa Abdela, located on the Via Augusta. It originated in the 13th century and was rebuilt in the 14th and 15th centuries. It has a square base, a four-sided roof, and two round towers in the opposite angles of the building, with battlements and loopholes for weapons. Nowadays, this medieval fortress is in the middle of an industrial estate. In 1999 it was awarded the title of best preserved castle in Catalonia.

=== Torre d'en Malla ===
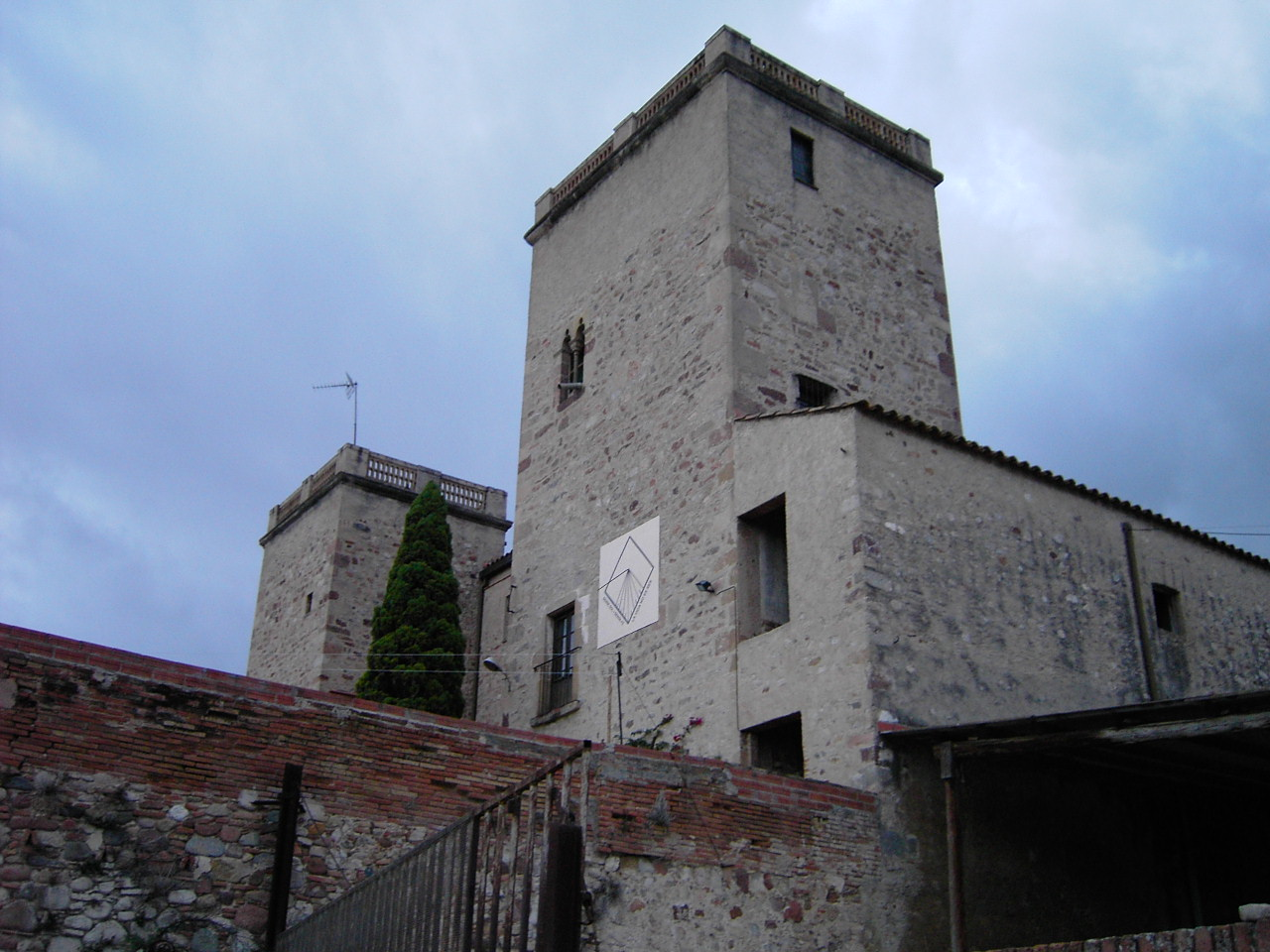
View of Torre d'en Malla

It is believed that Torre d'en Malla was a Roman villa, later called Villa Alzar, which defended the intersection of Via Augusta, which led to Martorell, with the Roman road from Barcelona to Vic, via Caldes de Montbui. Its main function was to defend the road and pedestrians, and its secondary function was farming, assigned to a retired general of the Roman army. More recently it was the residence of the owner of the Spanish brewery Damm.

== Curious facts about Parets ==
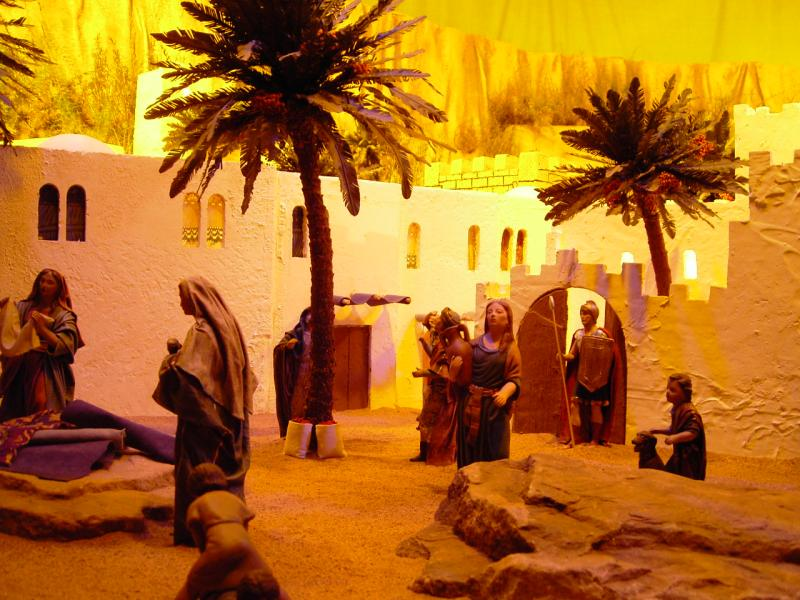
Detail from the monumental nativity scene

- Joan Clos (former Mayor of Barcelona (1997–2006) and Minister of Industry, Trade and Tourism of the Spanish government (2006–2008)) was born in Parets in 1949.
- The Circuit de Catalunya racetrack, home to the Formula One Spanish Grand Prix, is close to Parets (the north access to the town gets crowded when important races are held ).
- The summer fiesta is held on the last weekend of July; the winter fiesta is held at the end of January.
- In September 2004, Parets had an entry in The Guinness Book of World Records when they produced the largest candy in the world (1100 m long by 15 cm wide, with a weight of 900 kg). This was done to commemorate the 1100th anniversary of the town.
- Every year an indoor monumental nativity scene is built in Parets, using more than 12,000 kg of sand, 3,000 kg of stones, 1,500 kg of cork, and more than 800 figures (shown in picture). In 1996 it achieved the record of biggest nativity scene in Spain on a table (280 m^{2}).
