= Mollet del Vallès =

- Municipality
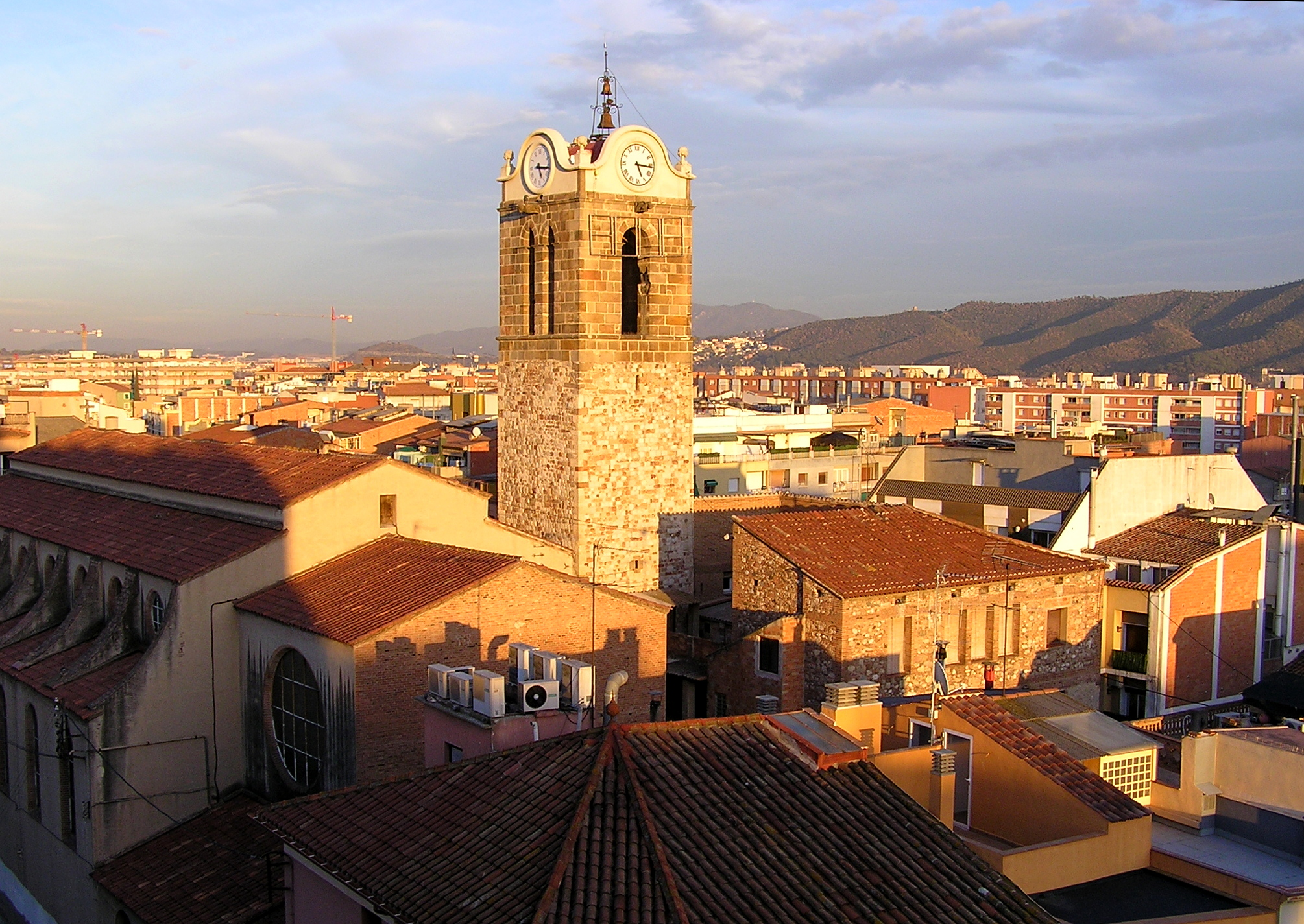

- Flag Coat of arms

- Location in Catalonia Mollet del Vallès (Spain)
- Coordinates: 41.539°N 2.213°E
- Country: Spain
- Community: Catalonia
- Province: Barcelona
- Comarca: Vallès Oriental

Government
  - Mayor: Mireia Dionisio (2022–) (PSC-PSOE)

Area
  - Total: 10.8 km^{2} (4.2 sq mi)
- Elevation: 65 m (213 ft)

Population (2025-01-01)
  - Total: 52,990
  - Density: 4,910/km^{2} (12,700/sq mi)
- Demonym: Molletà
- Area code: 08100
- Website: molletvalles.cat

Mollet del Vallès (Catalan pronunciation: [muˈʎɛd dəl βəˈʎɛs]) is a municipality in the comarca of the Vallès Oriental in Catalonia, Spain. It is situated in the valley of the Besòs river, and is an important communications hub from Barcelona towards the north: the AP-7 Motorway passes through the municipality, as do the Renfe railway lines to Vic and Puigcerdà and to Girona and Portbou. The town is also served by the C-17 highway (formerly N-152).

Mollet del Vallès has a number of buildings in the modernista and noucentista styles. The studio-museum of the painter Abelló displays modern Catalan art.

Shooting at the 1992 Summer Olympics was carried out in Mollet del Vallès; the range has been reused for the 1998 ISSF World Shooting Championships.

Tha flag is a horizontal tricolour, in the proportion 2:1:1, of white, red, and white, and has a red mullus (a goatfish) on the broad upper stripe.

== History ==
=== 10th century ===
In the middle of the 10th century, Mollet was a little center of population that depended on the bishop of Barcelona.

=== 12th century ===
Of the medieval past of Mollet, there is only remaining the Romanesque church of Santa Maria de Gallecs

=== From 15th to 18th centuries ===
Mollet (which back then also included Parets) did not raise the population until the 17th century, then, a new church was built, but as ruling a town with 3 churches was hard, there were constant conflicts, which concluded with the separation of Parets.

== Sites of interest ==
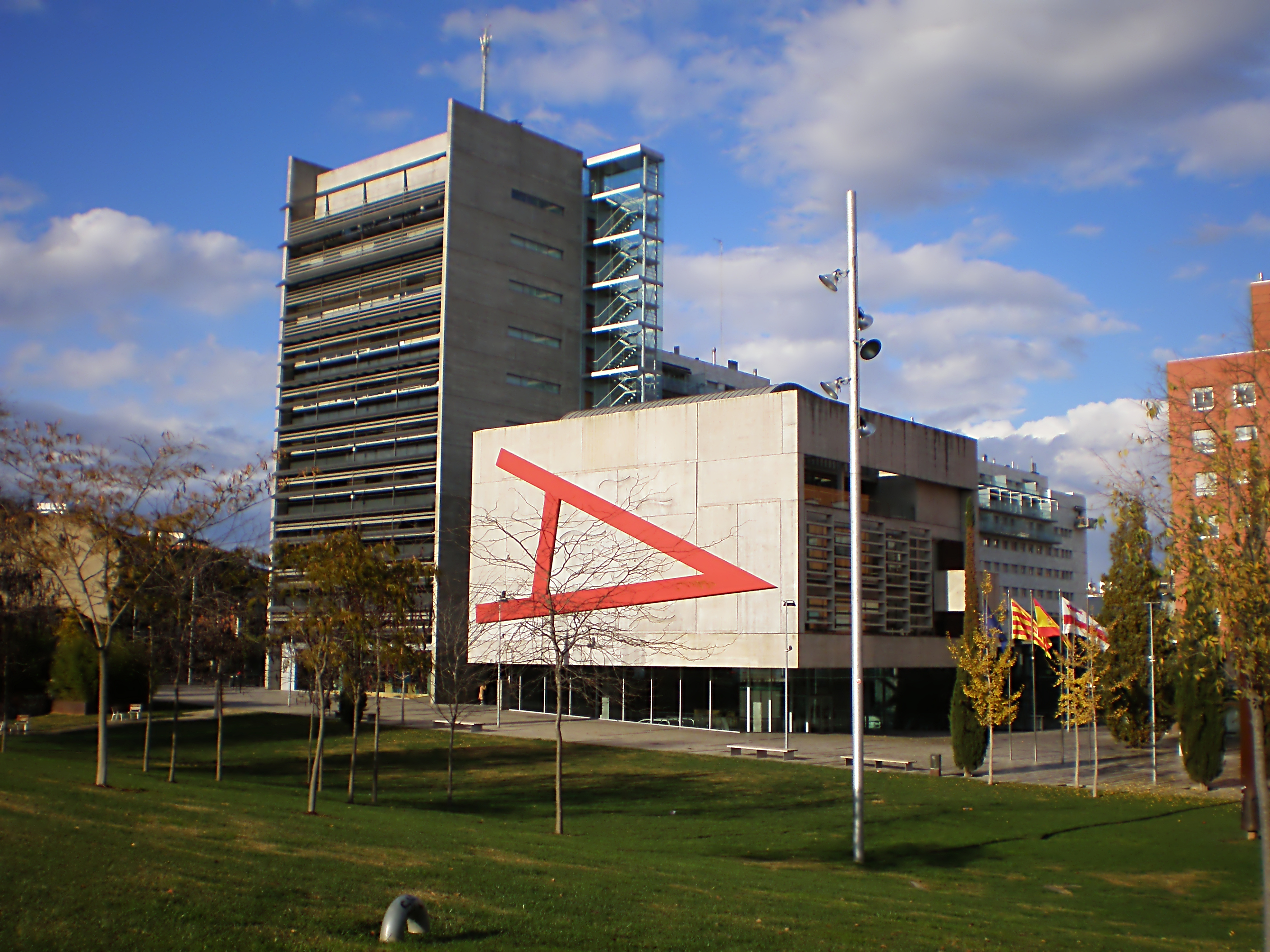
The City Hall

- St Fost's Church
- The Abelló Museum

The Abelló Museum is a municipal art museum located in Mollet del Vallès, in El Vallès Oriental.[1] Opened on 29 March 1999, its principal collection comprises pieces from artist and collector Joan Abelló, who donated his collection to the city in 1996, creating the Joan Abelló Foundation, an independent organisation of the Mollet del Vallès Town Council. The museum is located in an Art Nouveau-style building from 1908, of which only the façade has been preserved.

- The old Market

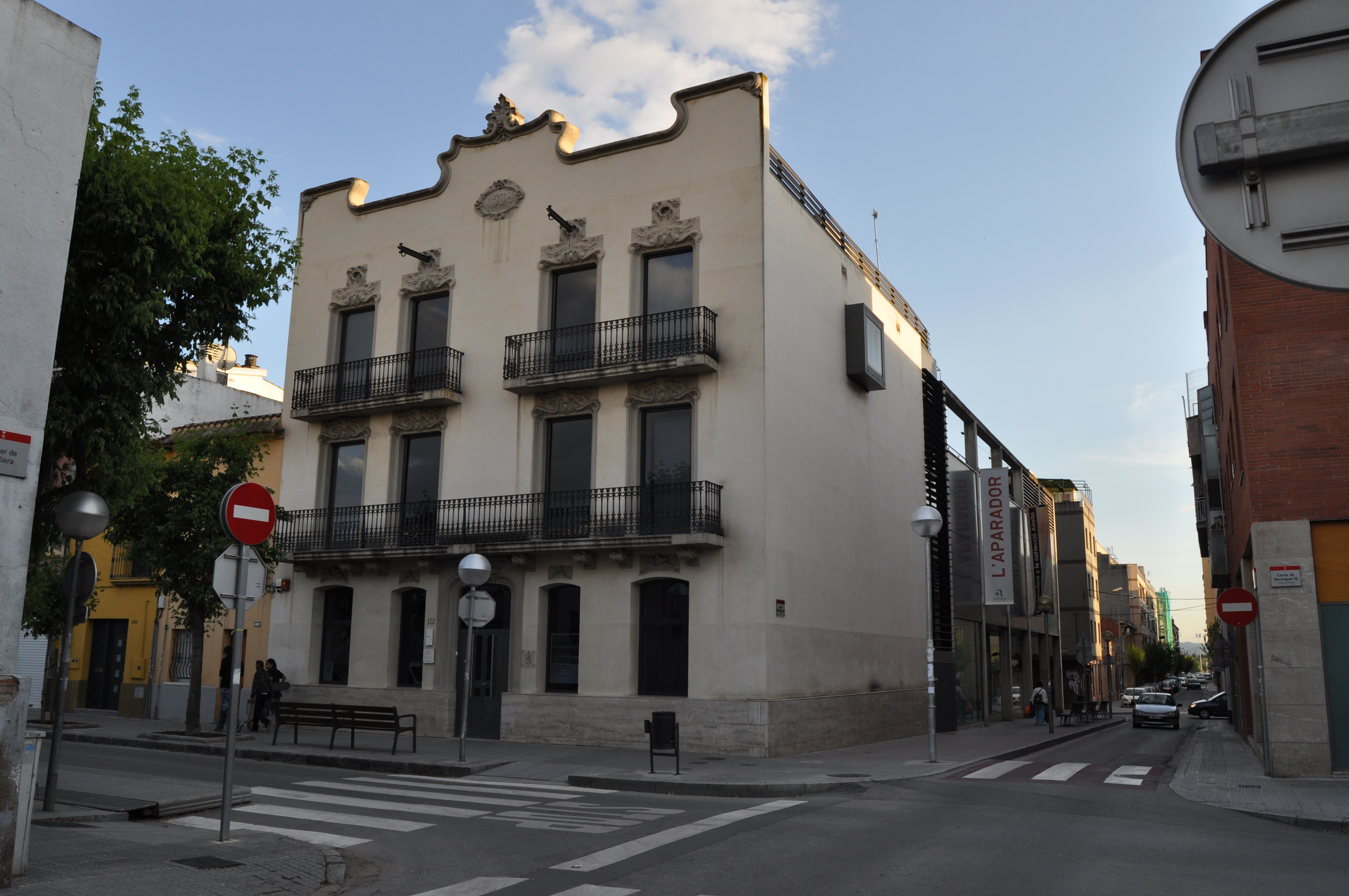
Abelló Museum.

== Notable people ==
- Joan Abelló i Prat, artist (1922–2008)
- Mojinos Escozíos, music group founded in Mollet, where some of its members live.
- Josep Maria Pou i Serra, actor and cinema director, teatre i televisió (1944)
- Alexia Putellas, professional footballer for London City Lionesses and Spain national team
- Anna Simon i Marí, journalist (1982)
- Josep Solà i Sánchez, musician (1930–2009)
- Jordi Solé i Tura, politician and founder of the Spanish Constitution of 1978 (1930–2009)
- Montserrat Tura, politician (1954)

== Twin towns ==
- Rivoli, Italy
- Cinco Pinos, Nicaragua
- Ravensburg, Germany
