= Sant Andreu station (Barcelona Metro) =

Metro station in Barcelona, Spain

Coordinates: 41°26′8″N 2°11′29″E

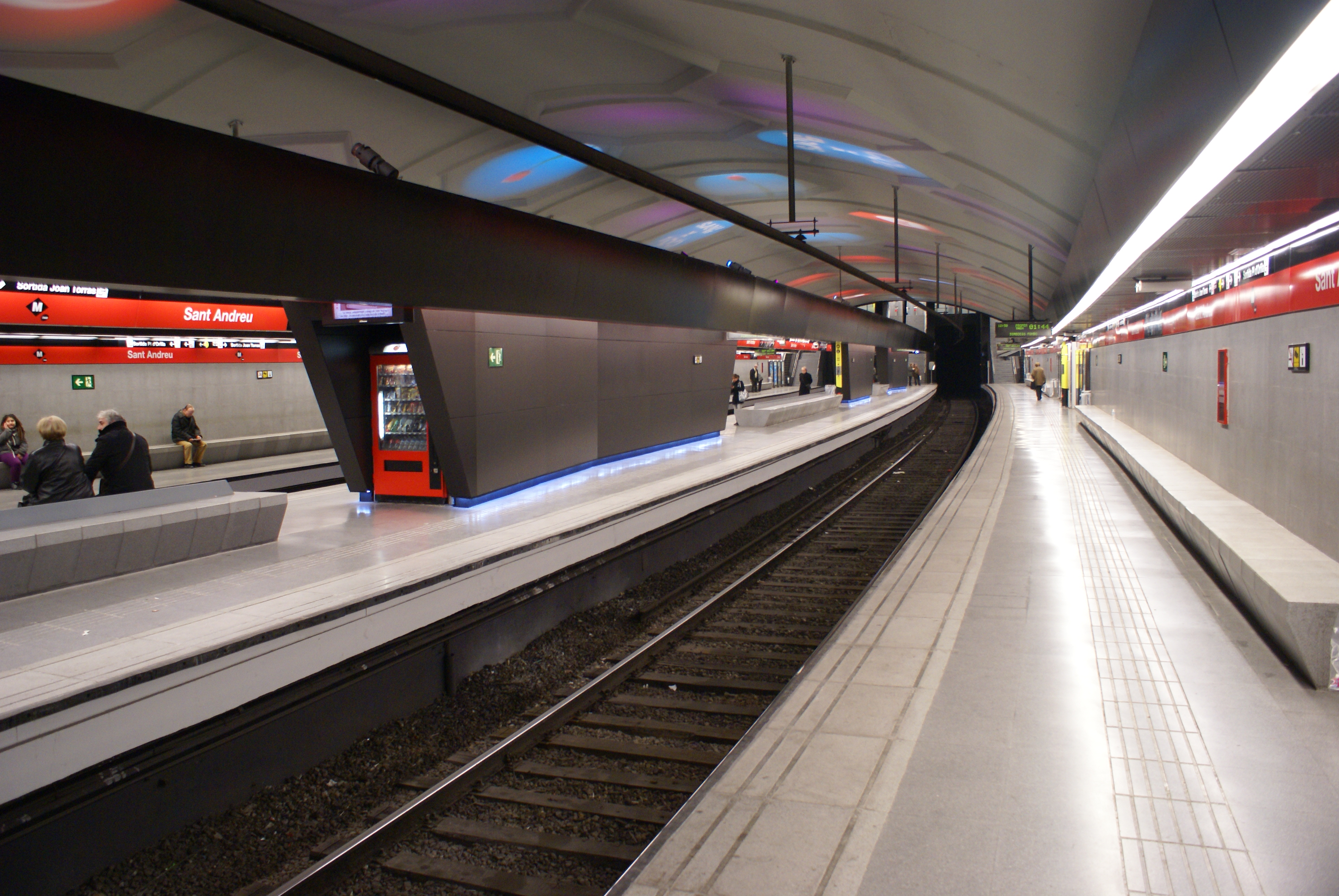
The station platforms

Sant Andreu (Catalan pronunciation: [ˈsant ənˈdɾew]) is a station of the Barcelona Metro network, served by line L1. Named after the neighbourhood of Sant Andreu de Palomar, in the Sant Andreu district of the city, the station was built in 1968 along with Fabra i Puig and Torras i Bages. It is interconnected with the nearby Sant Andreu railway station.

== Services ==
Preceding station	Metro	Following station
Fabra i Puig towards Hospital de Bellvitge	L1	Torras i Bages towards Fondo

== See also ==
- Sant Andreu railway station
- Plaça d'Orfila
