= Abello =

Abello or Abelló is a Spanish and Italian toponymic surname, and it's named after Avella in Italy. The name is more common in Spain today. Notable people with the surname include:

- Antònia Abelló (1913–1984), Catalan political activist, journalist, feminist, pianist and writer
- Jorge Enrique Abello (born 1968), Colombian actor
- José Abello Silva, Colombian drug trafficker
- Juan Abelló (born 1941), Spanish businessman and art collector
- Montserrat Abelló i Soler (1918–2014), Spanish poet and translator

== See also ==
- Abelló Museum, art museum in Catalonia, Spain
