= C-58 highway (Spain) =

Highway in Catalonia, Spain

C-58

Route information
- Length: 25 km (16 mi)

Major junctions
- From: Barcelona
- To: Terrassa

Location
- Country: Spain
- Autonomous community: Catalonia
- Province: Barcelona

Highway system
- Highways in Spain; Autopistas and autovías; National Roads; Primary Highways in Catalonia

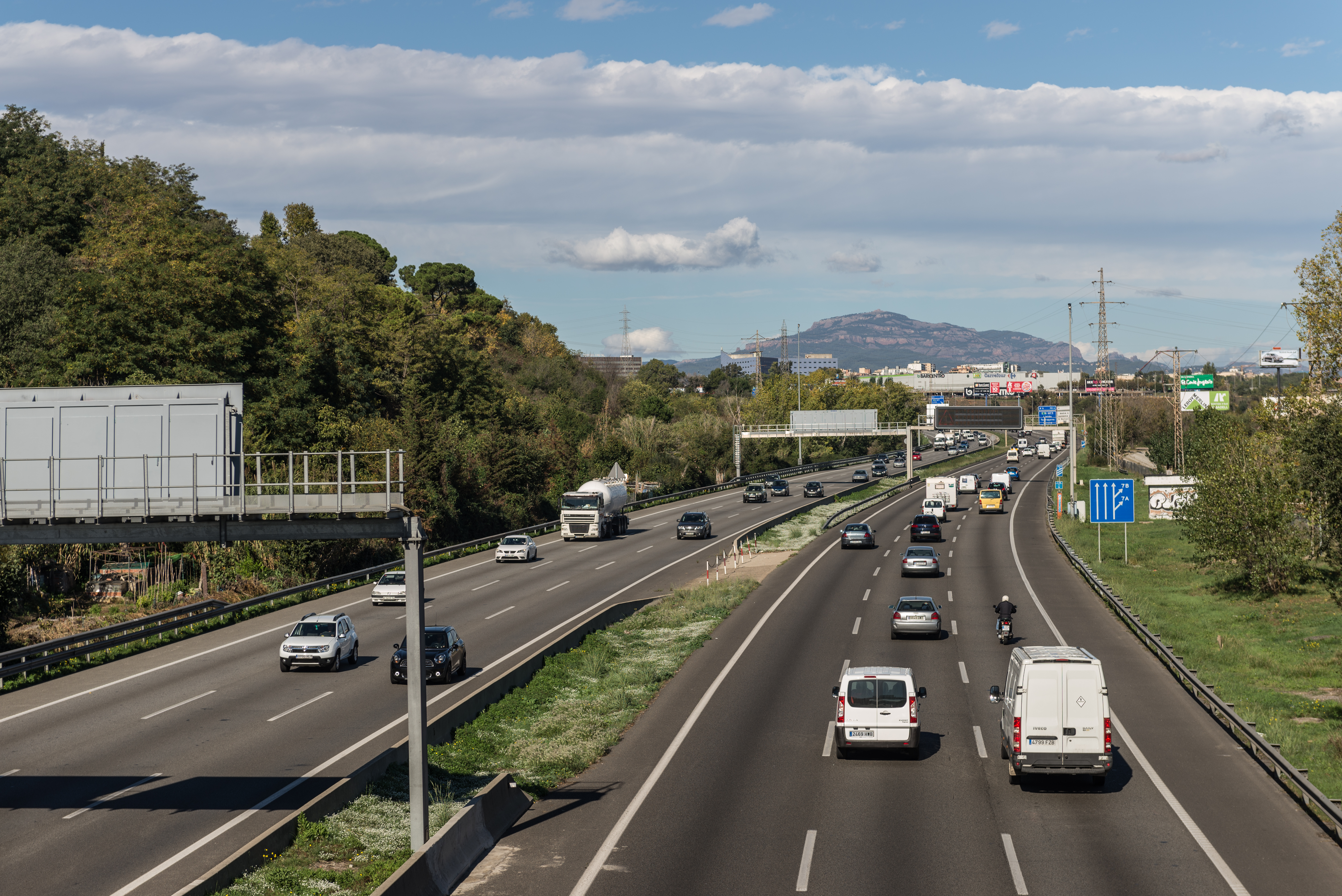

C-58 is a Spanish motorway that starts in Barcelona (Nus de la Trinitat) and ends in Terrassa, crossing Cerdanyola del Vallès, Sabadell and other cities which are part of the Barcelona metropolitan area. It is 25 kilometres (16 mi) long and connects with the toll highway C-16 highway (Spain).

Despite its shortness, it is the most-transited motorway in Catalonia and one of the most-transited highways in Spain. It is also the first highway that has implemented a new HOV Lane (in Spanish, Carril Bus-VAO), which was inaugurated on 29 October 2012.

After Terrassa, it continues as a conventional highway to Manresa, parallel to the C-16 highway.
