= C-31 highway (Spain) =

Primary highway in Catalonia, Spain

Coordinates: 41°11′54″N 1°34′23″E

C-31
- Eix Costaner

Major junctions
- From: El Vendrell
- To: Figueres

Location
- Country: Spain

Highway system
- Highways in Spain; Autopistas and autovías; National Roads

C-31 or Eix Costaner is one of Catalonia's primary highways. It is the result of merging several sections of previously existing roads, autopistas and autovías after the 2004's renaming of primary highways managed by the Generalitat de Catalunya. According to this new denomination, the first number (C-31) indicates that is a southwest-northeast highway (parallel to the Mediterranean Sea coastline), while the second number (C-31) indicates that is the closest to the Mediterranean Sea.

== Southern section (El Vendrell-South Barcelona) ==
The C-31's southern section has two clearly distinguished subsections:

The first corresponds to the former C-246 road, also known as Costes del Garraf. It starts at the intersection with the N-340 at El Vendrell and runs parallel to the Mediterranean Sea coastline passing through several coastal towns such as Calafell, Cubelles (Charlie Rivel's birth town), Vilanova i la Geltrú and Sitges, and across the Garraf Massif coast it finishes at Castelldefels.

The second subsection corresponds to the former C-246 autovía, also known as Autovia de Castelldefels. It connects Castelldefels with Barcelona's Gran Via and Plaça d'Espanya passing close to major cities such as El Prat de Llobregat and L'Hospitalet de Llobregat and to the Barcelona International Airport.

== North Barcelona section (North Barcelona-Montgat) ==
This C-31's section corresponds to a part of the former A-19 autopista, also known as Autopista del Maresme, which was the first autopista ever in Spain (1969). It starts at Barcelona's Plaça de les Glòries and runs parallel to the coastline passing through the city of Badalona and finishing at the intersection with the B-20 and the C-32, at Montgat.

This highway section should continue over the actual N-II, at the comarca of Maresme, but since this road is managed by the Spanish government, it has not been renamed yet.

== Costa Brava's section (Santa Cristina d'Aro-Figueres) ==
This section corresponds to the former C-253 and C-252 roads. It starts at the end of the Autovia C-65, at Santa Cristina d'Aro and runs parallel to the coastal line (Costa Brava) passing or by-passing the towns of Castell-Platja d'Aro, Palamós, Palafrugell, Pals, Torroella de Montgrí, Verges and Viladamat before ending at Figueres.

== See also ==
- C-32 highway (Spain)
