= Autovia C-60 =

Highway in Catalonia, Spain

Coordinates: 41°32′51″N 2°24′44″E

Autovía C-60
- Autovia Mataró - Granollers

Route information
- Length: 11 km (6.8 mi)

Major junctions
- From: Granollers
- To: Mataró

Location
- Country: Spain

Highway system
- Highways in Spain; Autopistas and autovías; National Roads

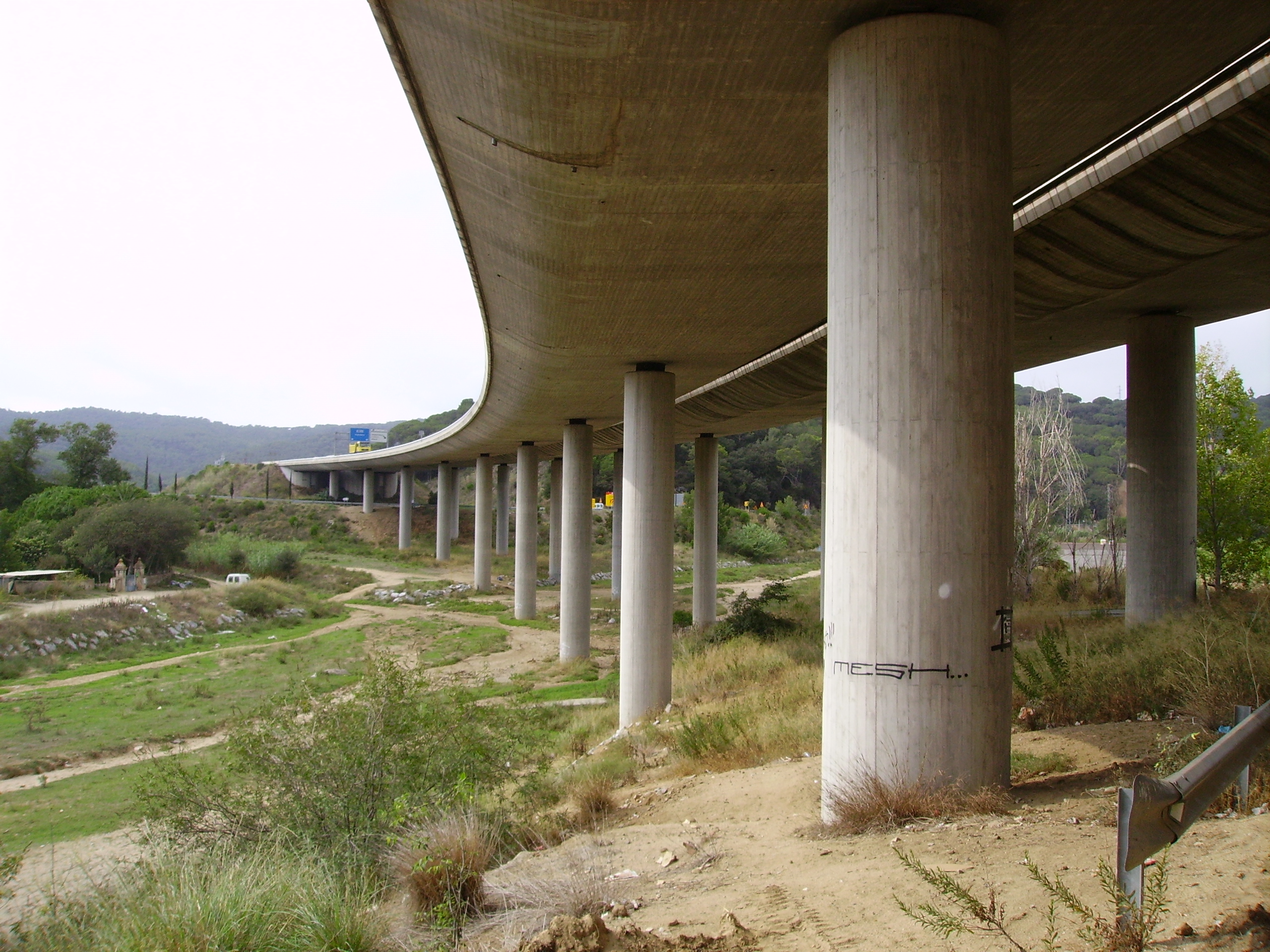
A bridge in C-60

The Autovia C-60, also known as the Autovia Mataró-Granollers, is a highway in Catalonia, Spain. This is a freeway that connects Mataró (the capital of the comarca of the Maresme) and Granollers (the capital of the comarca of the Vallès Oriental).

It connects junction 13 of the Autopista AP-7 with junction 13 of the Autopista Barcelona a Mataró (C-32). Although the other motorways are tolled the C-60 is free.
