= Torras i Bages station =

Metro station in Barcelona, Spain

Coordinates: 41°26′31″N 2°11′26″E

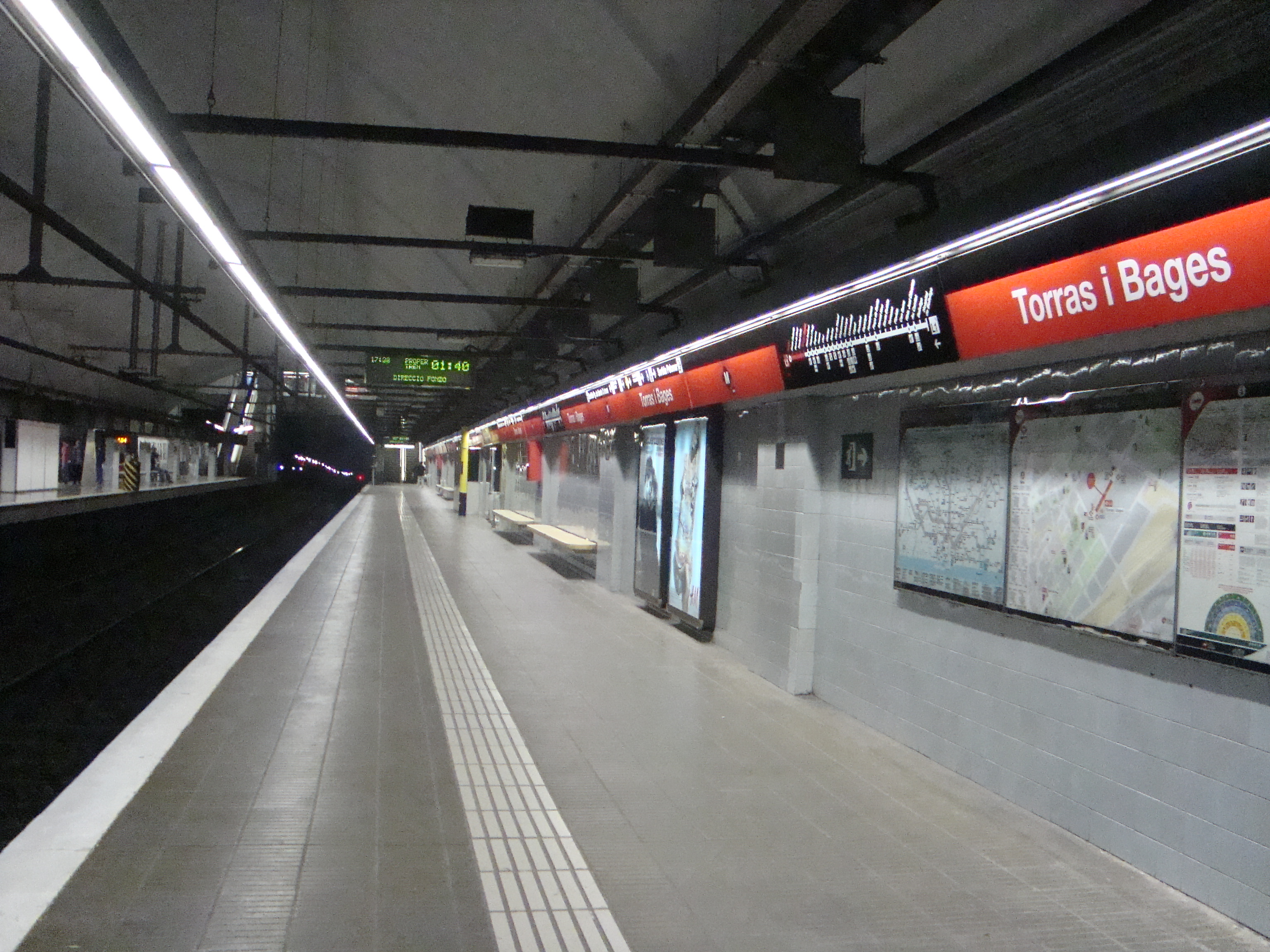
The station platforms

Torras i Bages (Catalan pronunciation: [ˈtorəz i ˈβaʒəs]) is a station of the Barcelona Metro, on L1 (red line). Opened in 1968, it serves the northern part of the Sant Andreu de Palomar neighbourhood in the Sant Andreu district. It was one of the termini of this subway line until 1983, when it was extended into Santa Coloma de Gramenet. The station does not include accessibility facilities as of 2008. It has two 107-metre-long platforms, and it is unusual for a subway station of this kind in having three railtracks as opposed to two, due to its former role as line terminus. The current railtrack leading to Fondo is actually a secondary one.

The station is named after a road, Passeig de Torras i Bages (and ultimately after the 19th century bishop of Vic Josep Torras i Bages.

== Services ==
Preceding station	Metro	Following station
Sant Andreu towards Hospital de Bellvitge	L1	Trinitat Vella towards Fondo

== See also ==
- List of Barcelona Metro stations
