= Santa Coloma station =

Metro station in Barcelona, Spain

Coordinates: 41°27′4″N 2°12′27″E

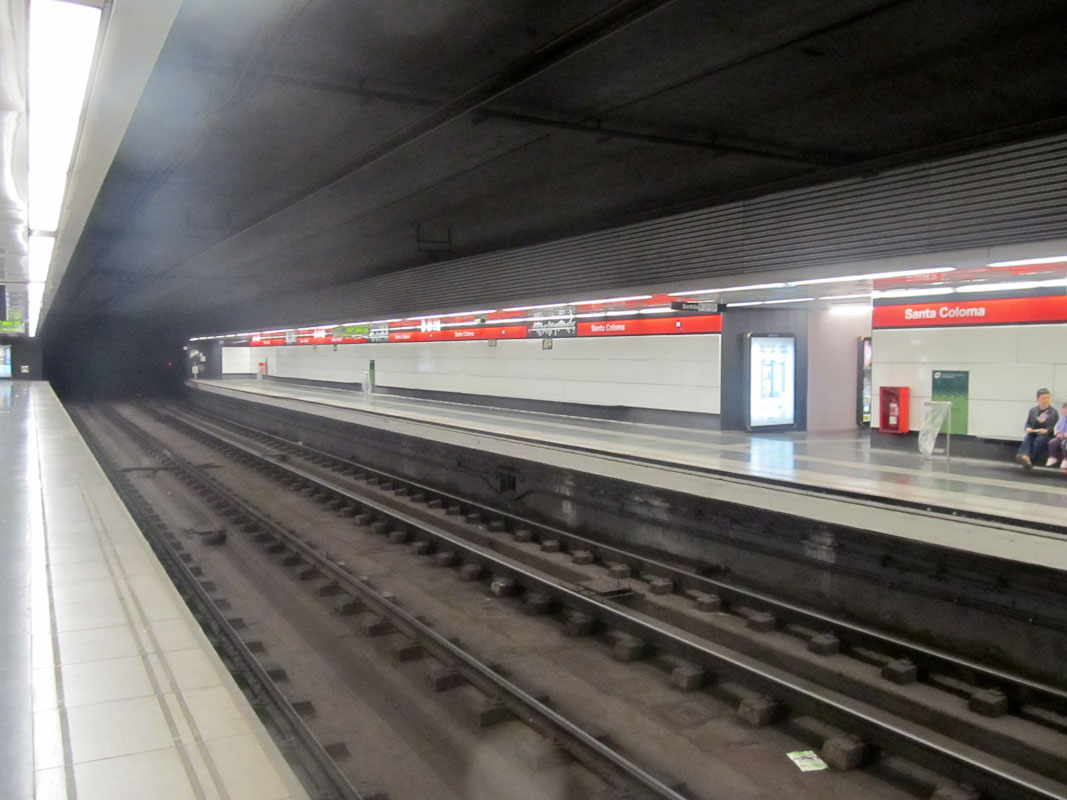
The station platforms

Santa Coloma (Catalan pronunciation: [ˈsantə kuˈlomə]) is a Barcelona Metro station in Santa Coloma de Gramenet, a municipality of the metropolitan area of Barcelona. It's served by L1 (red line). It opened in 1983 and is located under Passeig Llorenç Serra. Platforms are 99 m (325 ft) long.

== Services ==
| Preceding station | Metro | Following station |
|---|---|---|
| Baró de Viver towards Hospital de Bellvitge | L1 | Fondo Terminus |

== See also ==
- List of Barcelona Metro stations
