= Abelló Museum =

- Museu Abelló
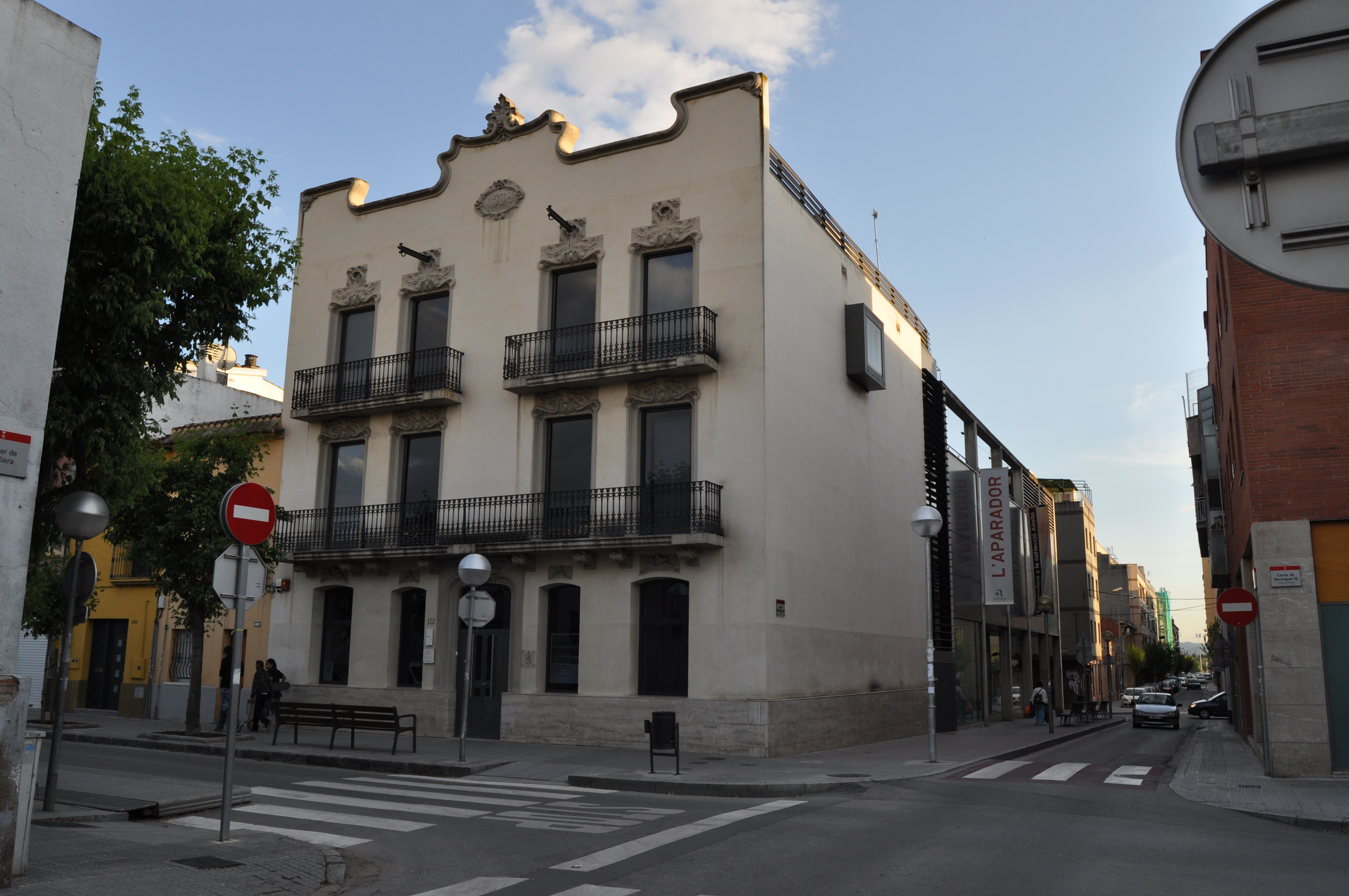
- Abelló Museum's façade

- Location within Province of Barcelona
- Established: March 1999
- Location: Mollet del Vallès, Barcelona, Spain
- Coordinates: 41.535778°N 2.215944°E
- Type: Art museum
- Website: www.museuabello.cat

The Abelló Museum is a municipal art museum located in Mollet del Vallès, in El Vallès Oriental. Opened on 29 March 1999, its principal collection comprises pieces from artist and collector Joan Abelló, which donated his collection to the city in 1996, creating the Joan Abelló Foundation, an independent organisation of the Mollet del Vallès Town Council. The museum is located in an Art Nouveau-style building from 1908, of which only the façade has been preserved.

== The collection ==
The collection, entitled Modern art from the Abelló collection, 19th-20th centuries, has more than 5,000 works of art, especially Catalan paintings from the 19th and 20th centuries. The collection boasts works from such artists as Ramon Casas, Modest Cuixart, Salvador Dalí, Joan Miró, Pablo Picasso and Antoni Tàpies, in addition to Abelló’s own works. The museum also shows a collection of Romanesque and Baroque sculpture, as well as Asian and African art. Noteworthy pieces

- Isidre Nonell - Porta de l'estudi and Cap d'home
- Ramon Casas - Esbós per a l'anunci d'Anís del Mono
- Darío de Regoyos - Víctimas de la fiesta (1894)
- Josep Llimona - Melangia
- Joan Ponç i Bonet - Dau al Set (1949)
- Manolo Hugué - Torero (1937)
- Pancho Cossio - Bodegó
