= Autovía C-65 =

Highway in Spain

Autovía C-65

Major junctions
- From: Girona-AP-7
- To: Sant Feliu de Guíxols

Location
- Country: Spain

Highway system
- Highways in Spain; Autopistas and autovías; National Roads

The C-65 is a highway linking Junction 7 of the Autopista AP-7 and the resorts of the Costa Brava.

It passes to the south of Girona, Quart, Cassà de Selva, Llagostera, Santa Cristina d'Aro and Sant Feliu de Guíxols. The road has been upgraded in parts to Autovia grade. It carries particularly heavy traffic in summer and weekends as tourists and residents of Girona head to the coast.

It has junctions with the C-31 to Palamós and C-35.
