= Nus de la Trinitat =

- Interactive map of Nus de la Trinitat

Location
- Barcelona, Catalonia, Spain
- Coordinates: 41°26′57.74″N 2°11′53.86″E
- Roads at junction: B-10 B-20 C-58

Construction
- Type: Stack interchange
- Opened: 1992

Nus de la Trinitat (Spanish : Nudo de la Trinidad), is a major highway interchange in northern Barcelona, Catalonia, Spain. It was constructed in 1992, for the 1992 Summer Olympics. In fact, it was one of the main components of the Barcelona high-capacity beltway, formed by Ronda Litoral and Ronda de Dalt.

There are four highways converging to the Nus de la Trinitat:

- Ronda de Dalt ( B-20).
- Ronda Litoral ( B-10)
- C-58 highway ( C-58)
- B-20 Barcelona-Montgat motorway.

Nus de la Trinitat is the busiest traffic junction in Barcelona since four primary motorways converge there and is frequently saturated on rush hour.
