= N-230 road (Spain) =

National road of Spain

Coordinates: 42°37′35″N 0°45′47″E

National road N-230
- Carretera nacional N-230
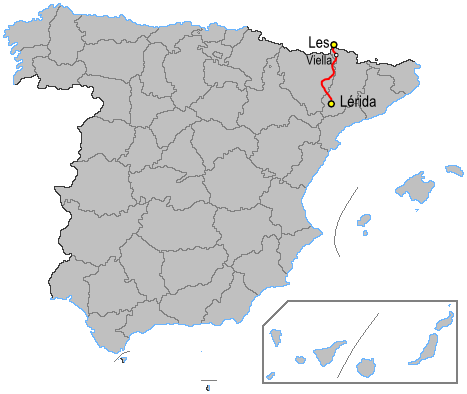

Route information
- Length: 188 km (117 mi)

Major junctions
- From: Lleida
- To: French frontier

Location
- Country: Spain

Highway system
- Highways in Spain; Autopistas and autovías; National Roads

The N-230 is a road in Spain. It connects Lleida to Vielha, the Vall d'Aran and France.

It passes through Benabarre, the Vall del Noguera Ribagorçana and the Vielha tunnel (5.240m). The road is to be up-graded to the Autovía A-14.

== History ==
As one of the routes that joins France and Spain, demonstrations have sometimes closed the border. For example, in November 2024, farmers and others protested which caused the road to temporarily close.

== See also ==
- Autovía A-138

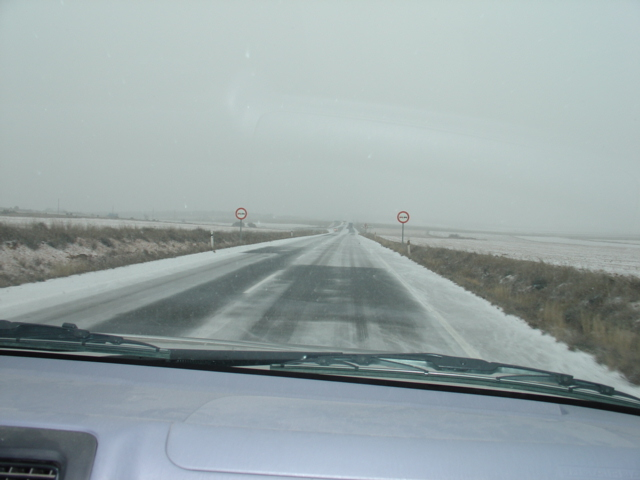
The Road N-230 in Purroy de la Solana (Huesca)
