= Autovía B-20 =

Spanish road in Barcelona

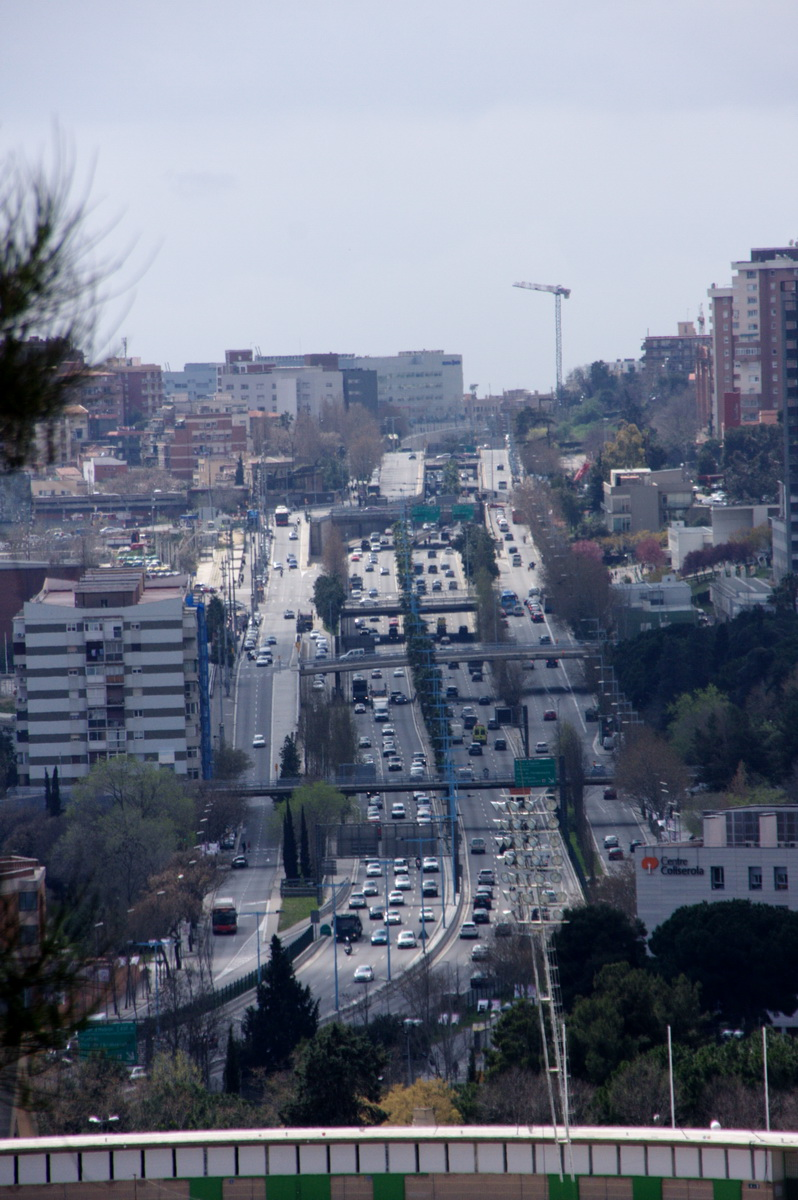

The B-20, also known as Ronda de Dalt (English: Upper Ring Road) is a ring road or beltway within Barcelona and other parts of its metropolitan area, running from l'Hospitalet de Llobregat, to Nus de la Trinitat in the Sant Andreu district of Barcelona. It was completed in 1992 on the occasion of the 1992 Summer Olympics. Parts of the road are completely underground whereas some other look pretty much like other thoroughfares in the city.

== Other ring roads and rondes in Barcelona ==
- Ronda del Mig
- Ronda Litoral
- Ronda del Guinardó

== See also ==
- List of beltways
- Street names in Barcelona
- Urban planning of Barcelona
