= C-17 highway (Spain) =

Highway in Catalonia, Spain

Autovía C-17
- Eix del Congost

Route information
- Length: 101 km (63 mi)

Major junctions
- From: Barcelona
- To: Ripoll

Location
- Country: Spain

Highway system
- Highways in Spain; Autopistas and autovías; National Roads

C-17 or Eix del Congost is a primary highway in Catalonia, Spain. According to the 2004's new coding for primary highways managed by the Generalitat de Catalunya, the first number (C-17) indicates that is a south-northbound highway, whereas the second number (C-17) indicates that is the seventh westernmost.

The highway starts at the city of Barcelona and heads mainly northbound towards the towns of Mollet del Vallès, Granollers, Vic and Ripoll. Its path follows the valleys of Congost and upper Ter rivers.

From Mollet del Vallès to Vic, the road is already upgraded to freeway. The Vic-Ripoll section is currently in process of being upgraded.

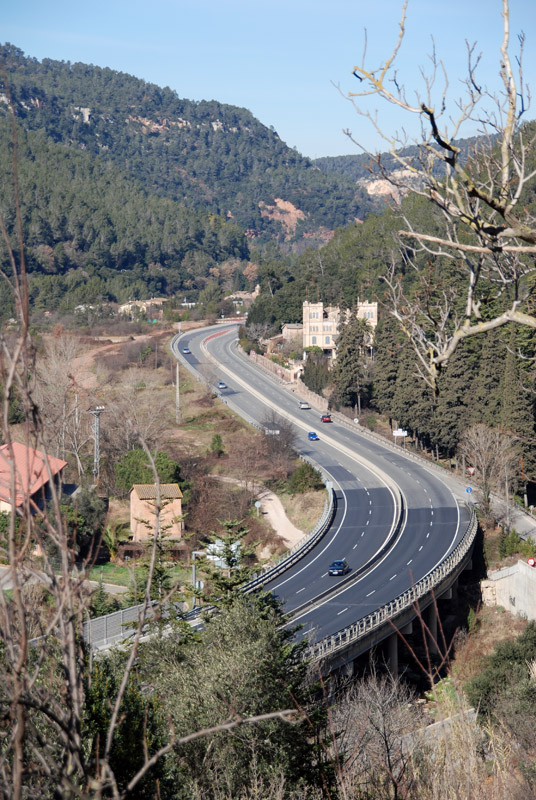
C-17 road through Figaró-Montmany
