= Autovía A-2 =

Road in Spain

Coordinates: 41°37′10″N 1°25′02″E

Autovía A-2
- Autovía del Nordeste; Autovia del Nord-est
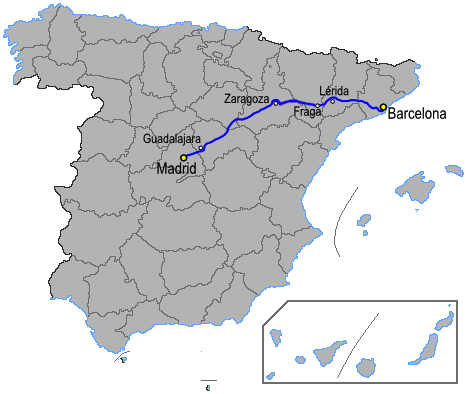

Route information
- Maintained by the Ministry of Public Works and Transport
- Length: 504 km (313 mi)

Major junctions
- From: Madrid
- To: Barcelona

Location
- Country: Spain

Highway system
- Highways in Spain; Autopistas and autovías; National Roads

The Autovía A-2 (also called Autovia del Nordeste and Avenida de América, Catalan: Autovia del Nord-est) is a Spanish autovía and autopista route which starts in Madrid and ends in Barcelona. It replaces the former N-II.

== Sections ==
#	From	To	Length	Signal
1	Madrid	Zaragoza	308.08 km	A-2
2	Igualada	Martorell	36.09 km	A-2
3	Martorell	Barcelona	31.68 km	A-2

== Major cities crossed ==
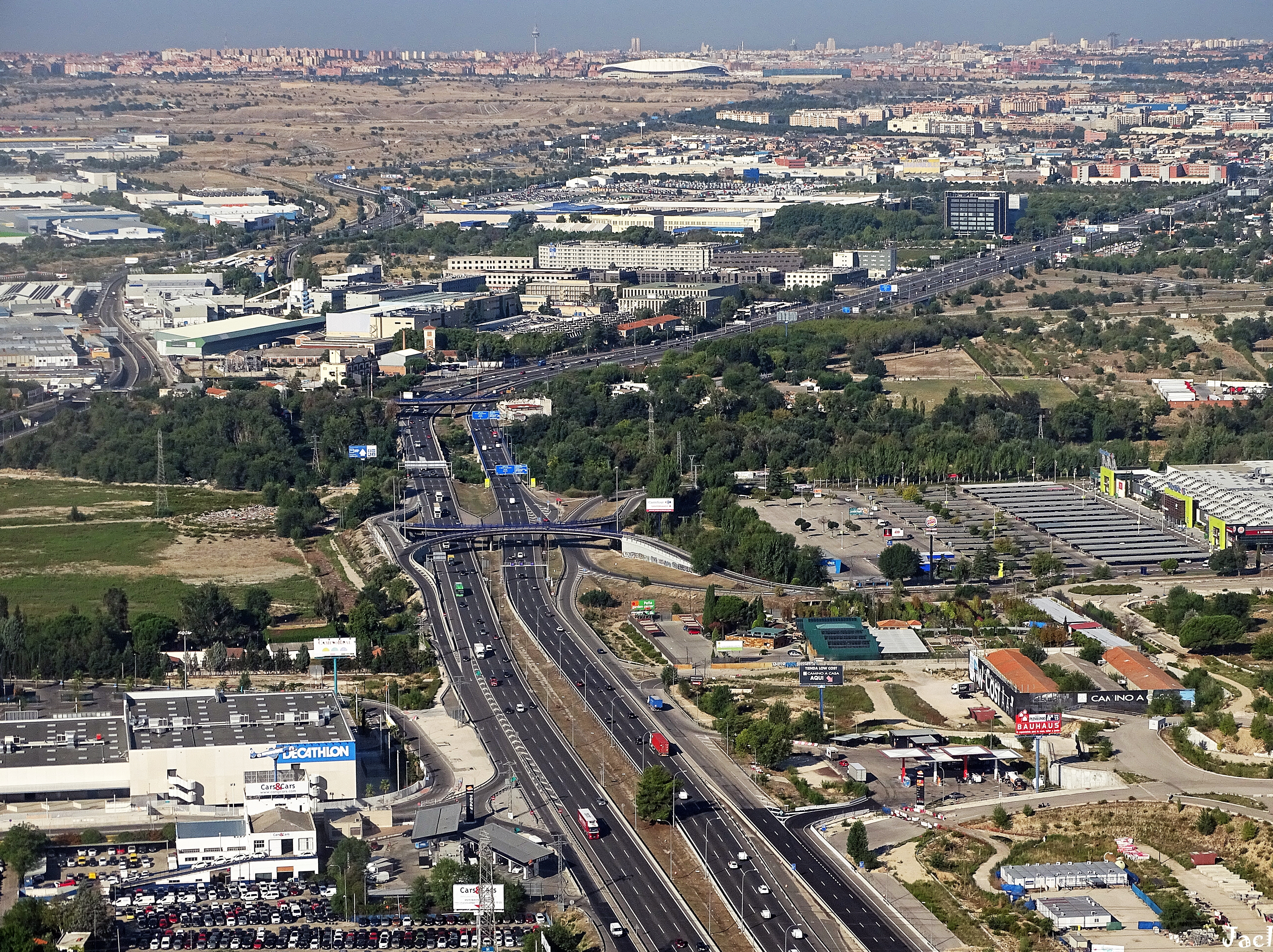
Autovía A-2 in Madrid

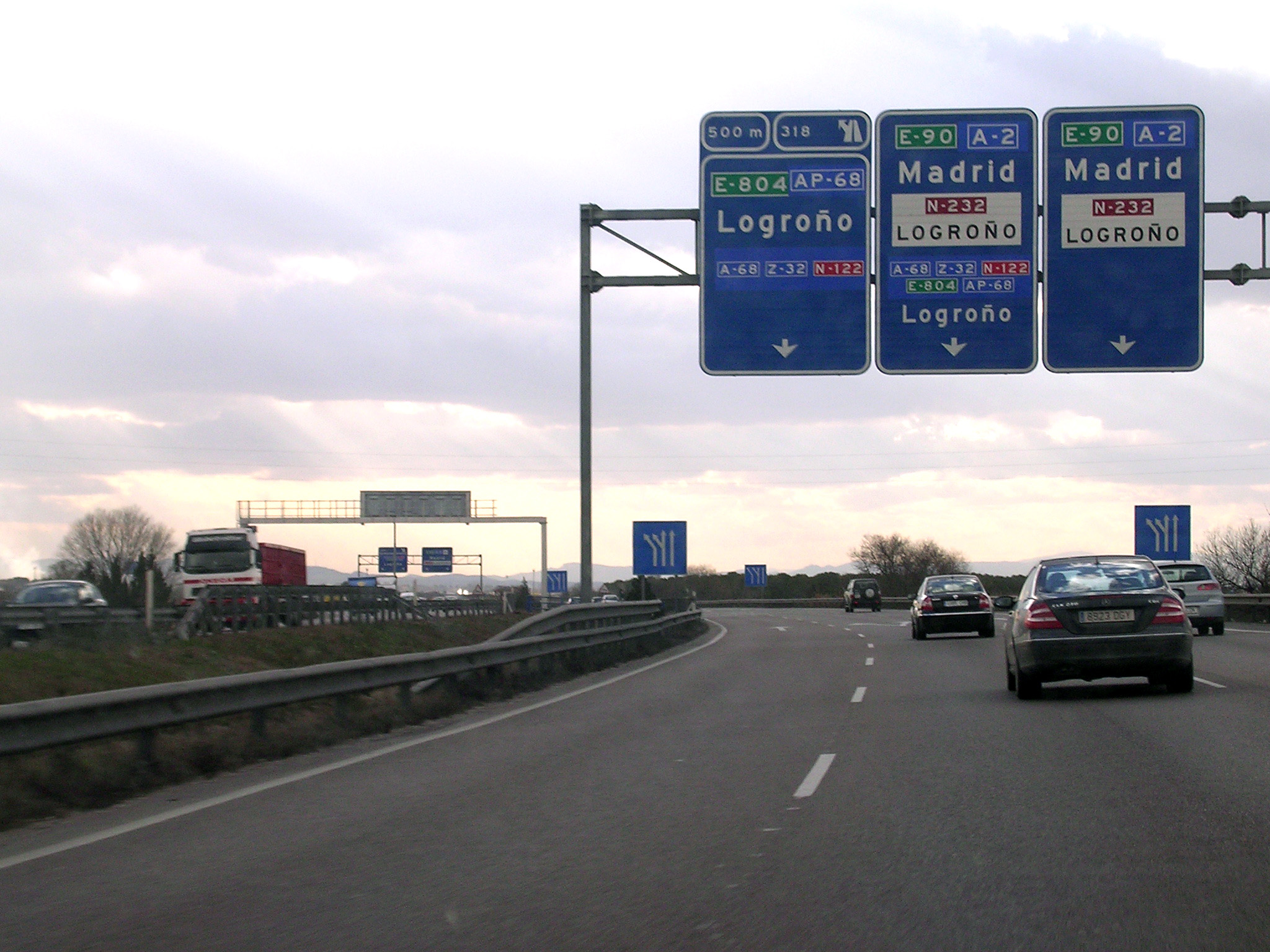
Autovía A-2 in Zaragoza

- Madrid
- Guadalajara
- Zaragoza
- Fraga
- Lleida
- Martorell
- Barcelona

== See also ==
- Avenida de América (Madrid Metro)
