= C-32 highway (Spain) =

Highway in Catalonia, Spain

Coordinates: 41°34′57″N 2°32′06″E

C-32
- Corredor del Mediterrani

Route information
- Length: 132 km (82 mi)

Major junctions
- From: El Vendrell
- To: Tordera

Location
- Country: Spain

Highway system
- Highways in Spain; Autopistas and autovías; National Roads

C-32 is a primary highway in Catalonia, Spain. It was created in 2004 by merging three sections of existing autopistas and autovías. This re-organisation was part of a renaming of primary highways managed by the Generalitat de Catalunya. According to this new denomination, the first number (C-32) indicates that is a southwest-northeast highway (parallel to the Mediterranean Sea coastline), while the second number (C-32) indicates that is the second-closest to the Mediterranean Sea.

The Barcelona-Mataró's section of the former A-19 (now renamed to C-31 and C-32) was the first autopista ever in Spain (1969).

== Southern section (El Vendrell-Sant Boi de Llobregat) ==
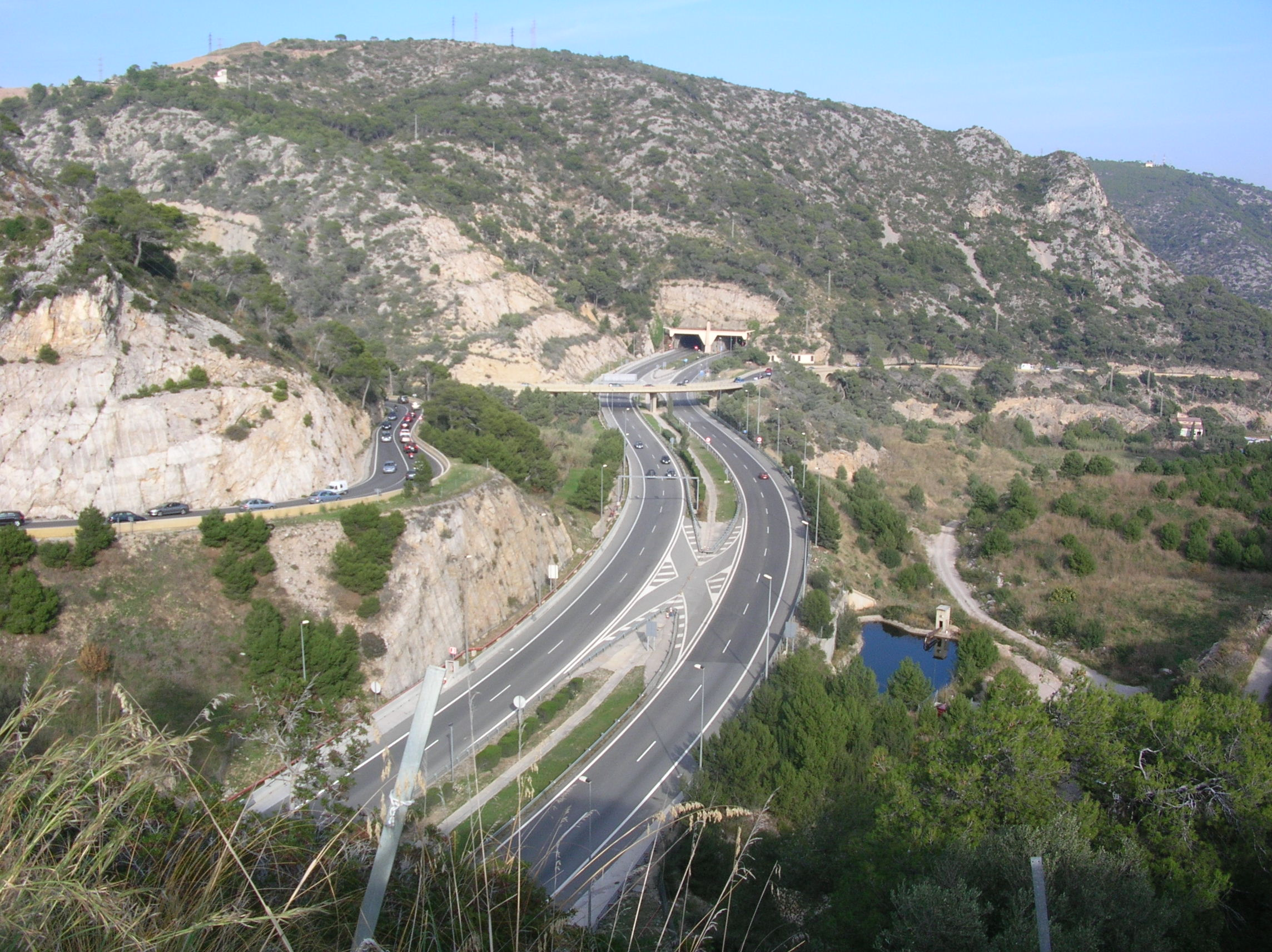
C-32 around Sitges

The C-32's southern section, also known as Autopista de Pau Casals (officially), named in honor of the famous cellist Pablo Casals, who is known as Pau Casals in Catalan, or non-officially Túnels del Garraf after the tunnels through the Garraf Massif, was previously named A-16 before the redenomination. It is a partially tolled autopista which runs parallel to the southern Barcelona's Mediterranean coast. It starts at the intersection with the AP-7, near El Vendrell, and finishes at the intersection with the Barcelona-El Prat Airport access freeway, near Sant Boi de Llobregat.

It connects several relevant towns such as Vilanova i la Geltrú, Sitges and Castelldefels, as well as it passes close to the Barcelona-El Prat Airport.

== Middle section (Sant Boi de Llobregat-Montgat) ==
The middle section should correspond to the actual autovía B-20, also known as Ronda de Dalt, which is a part of the Barcelona's Rondes (ring road). This section has not been renamed yet because it is managed by the Spanish government.

== Northern section (Montgat-Tordera) ==
The northern section is a part of the former autopista A-19, also known as Autopista del Maresme. It begins at the intersection of the middle section (B-20) with the C-31, at Montgat, and finishes at Tordera, from where Blanes can be reached by road. It crosses the comarca of Maresme, connecting relevant towns such as Vilassar de Mar, Mataró, Arenys de Mar, Calella or Malgrat de Mar. An extension of this section from Tordera to Lloret de Mar and Tossa de Mar is a controversial issue which is still in the middle of a discussion process.
