= N-2 road (Spain) =

National road in Spain

National road II
- Carretera nacional N-II
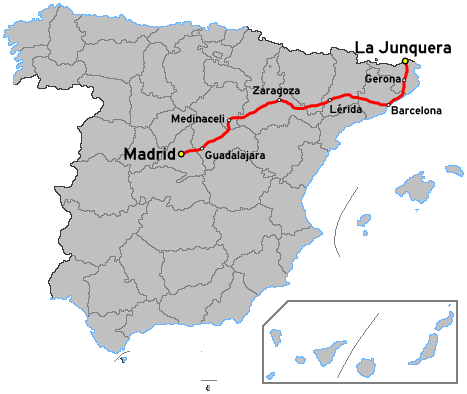

Route information
- Length: 780 km (480 mi)

Major junctions
- From: Madrid
- To: La Jonquera

Location
- Country: Spain

Highway system
- Highways in Spain; Autopistas and autovías; National Roads

N-II was the former name for the National Route from Madrid to Barcelona and France. According to the new Spanish roads nomenclature, the sections which have been already enhanced and upgraded to autovía have been recently renamed to A-2, whereas the sections still not upgraded (Zaragoza-Fraga and Barcelona-French border sections) keep the old name N-II.

At the French border, near La Jonquera, the route links to the French N9.

Most of the traffic formerly carried by the road now takes the A-7 and A-2 autovía.

The road is still in the process of being fully dualled but already by-passes the major towns of Girona and Figueres.

== Monument ==
Near Girona there is a monument at the side of the road in the memory of a worker dead when building the road.
