= Àrea Metropolitana de Barcelona =

Spanish public body

Coordinates: 41°22′20″N 2°4′36″E

- Highlighted in yellow, the Àrea Metropolitana de Barcelona inside the bigger Vegueria or Àmbit metropolità de Barcelona.
- Abbreviation: AMB
- Formation: 21 July 2011 (as a public administration)
- Type: public body
- Headquarters: Barcelona, Catalonia, Spain
- President: Jaume Collboni
- Executive Vice-president: Antonio Balmón
- Website: http://www.amb.cat

The Àrea Metropolitana de Barcelona (Catalan pronunciation: [ˈaɾeə mətɾupuliˈtanə ðə βərsəˈlonə], AMB [ˈa ˈemə ˈβe]; English: Metropolitan Area of Barcelona) is a public body operating on the principle of metropolitan authority. It is composed of representatives of Barcelona and 36 adjacent municipalities accounting for a population of 3,239,337 (Idescat, 2014) within an area of 636 km^{2}. Its jurisdiction constitutes the main core of the unofficial Barcelona metropolitan area, with a population over 5 million.

== Precursor bodies ==
The three historic executive bodies, which existed until the 2011 restructuring, were:

- Mancomunitat de Municipis (Union of Municipalities): Covering 31 municipalities, it manages common services affecting public spaces, infrastructure, facilities, urbanism and housing for 3,029,389 inhabitants in an area of 495 km^{2}. Given the range of services it offers, it is often construed as the core of the AMB.
- Entitat del Transport (Transport Authority): Covering 18 municipalities, it serves a population of 2,790,803 in an area of 332 km^{2}. These make up the strict Barcelona conurbation. Created to jointly manage public transport within its area.
- Entitat del Medi Ambient (Environment Authority): Covering 33 municipalities it serves a population of 3,121,795 in an area of 583 km^{2}. Entrusted with water supply and waste management for the area.
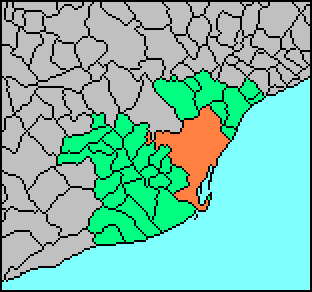
Union of Municipalities

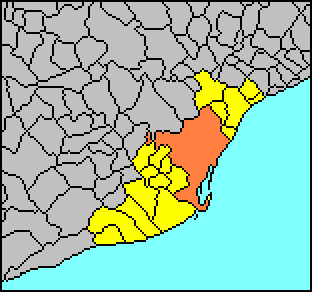
Transport Body

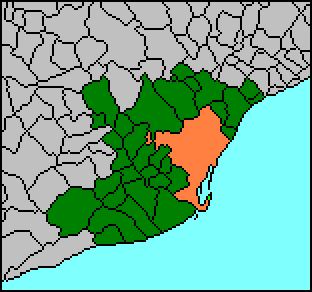
Environmental Body

== Powers ==
=== Territorial ===
The AMB is responsible for three areas: territorial planning, urban planning and infrastructures of metropolitan interest.

==== Territorial planning ====
- Participation in the preparation and proceeding of the general territorial Plan of Catalonia.
- Participation in the preparation and monitoring of the partial territorial plans that affect its area and the sectoral territorial plans that affect its powers.
- Preparation of plans, charters and programmes for the protection, management and planning of landscape.

==== Urban planning ====
- Integrated urban planning of the metropolitan territory by means of the Metropolitan Urban Master Plan (PDUM) and the Metropolitan Urban Planning Plan (POUM). The AMB is responsible for the initiative for the formulation and initial and provisional approvals of both plans and their subsequent amendments.
- Participation in the Urban Planning Commission of the Metropolitan Area of Barcelona.
- Formulation and approval of the initial and provisional pluri-municipal urban development programmes.
- Formulation and approval of derived planning elements having metropolitan interest or affecting several municipalities.
- Urban management of the PDUM and the POUM as a competent and acting Administration.
- Protection of urban legality by delegation of municipalities or replacement of municipal authority. Exercise of sanctioning powers, where appropriate.
- Cooperation and legal and financial support to municipalities concerning with planning, action programmes, projects and works, and urban discipline.

==== Metropolitan infrastructure ====
- Execution and management of infrastructure related to mobility, parks, beaches, natural areas, equipment, resources, facilities, technical environmental services and supplies services.

=== Transport and mobility ===
The AMB plans and manages bus networks and other public transport, except for trams.

Its powers, apart from planning and management, are:

- Urban surface public transport, except for trams.
- Metro and underground public transportation.
- Regulation of the taxi service.
- Approval of the Urban Mobility Metropolitan Plan. Definition of the basic metropolitan road network. Participation in traffic management in this network, together with the Catalan Government.
- Planning and management of passenger transportation with tourist and cultural purposes, delegated by town councils.
- Promotion of sustainable transport.
- Management of the Barcelona ring roads.

=== Environment and sustainability ===
Environmental and sustainability powers include the water supply and treatment, waste management and management of the environment.

==== Water cycle ====
- Home supply of drinking water or domestic water supply downstream.
- Purification of water collected for its use.
- Wastewater purification.
- Regeneration of purified wastewater for other uses such as irrigation or aquifers recharging.
- Coordination of water treatment municipal systems, including the planning and integrated management of rainwater and wastewater evacuation, and of the sewage.
- Regulation of the corresponding fees.

Waste

- Treatment of municipal waste products and products resulting from works, as well as its recovery (reuse and recycling of paper, metal, plastic and other materials, energy and compost production, etc.) and disposal (controlled discharge of non-recyclable waste products).
- Coordination of municipal collection systems.
- Picking and selection of containers.
- Waste recycling facility, in collaboration with municipalities.

Other powers

- Coordination and formulation of a Metropolitan Action Plan for environment, health and biodiversity protection, and measures to fight against climate change, and formulation of a metropolitan 21 Agenda.•
- Participation in the production of acoustic capacity and strategic noise maps.
- Issue of environmental reports.
- Collaboration with municipalities in environmental planning policies.
- Development and management of renewable energy facilities.

=== Housing ===
The AMB exercises its powers in land and housing policies established by the urban legislation. It does so by delegation of metropolitan municipalities and to ensure intermunicipal solidarity in these actions.

- The AMB defines land and housing policies, within the Metropolitan Urban Master Plan, with the aim of ensuring intermunicipal solidarity in these actions and exercising the constitutional right to housing.
- The AMB exercises its powers in land and housing policies as laid down by the urban legislation, delegated by metropolitan municipalities.
- The AMB carries out territorial planning actions to assign land to industrial and tertiary uses; promotes affordable housing, and is responsible for the construction of public equipments commissioned by metropolitan municipalities.
- Similarly, the metropolitan administration exercises its powers in housing as recognised by law and those delegated by agreement or via consortium.

=== Economic development ===
The AMB aims to promote economic activity, employment and entrepreneurship in the areas of industry, trade, services and tourism resources.

- Promotion of economic activity, employment and entrepreneurship in the areas of industry, trade, services and tourism resources.
- Promotion of a Strategic Metropolitan Plan for modernisation, research and innovation.

=== Social cohesion ===
Social cohesion is one of the objectives of the creation of the AMB and is the principle by which all policies concerning urban planning, transport, environment, infrastructures and assistance to metropolitan municipalities are defined.

The aim is to achieve a cohesive and united metropolitan development, in which the benefits and costs of living in the metropolitan area are equally distributed among its inhabitants, regardless of the municipality in which they live.

To fulfil this aim, the powers of the AMB also include the following:

- Promotion of pluri-municipal policies enhancing social cohesion and territorial balance.
- Participation in the Safety Commission of the metropolitan territorial area in order to promote civic coexistence policies.

== Geography ==
The Àrea Metropolitana de Barcelona is set on the central Catalan Coast and around the capital. The metropolitan area can be divided into two zones:

- The boundary zone forming the conurbation with the city of Barcelona itself. Bordered by the Mediterranean Sea and the Serra de Collserola, the towns in this zone are Badalona, Hospitalet de Llobregat, Santa Coloma de Gramenet and Cornellà de Llobregat. Here the boundaries between municipalities are set by streets, avenues or the Llobregat and Besòs rivers.
- The adjacent metropolitan zone, made up of several towns surrounded by predominantly residential suburban areas with detached, semi-detached and terraced housing, industrial estates, parkland and woods, such as Sant Vicenç dels Horts, Sant Cugat del Vallès and Cerdanyola del Vallès.

== Municipalities ==
Municipality	Comarca	Population (2023)	Area (km^{2})	Density (pop./km^{2})	Metropolitan Councilors
Barcelona	Barcelonès	1,655,956	101.4	16,339	25
L'Hospitalet de Llobregat	Barcelonès	276,617	12.4	22,307.8	4
Badalona	Barcelonès	224,301	21.2	10,590.2	4
Santa Coloma de Gramenet	Barcelonès	119,195	7	17,027.9	4
Sant Cugat del Vallès	Vallès Occidental	97,579	48.2	2,023.2	3
Cornellà de Llobregat	Baix Llobregat	90,076	7	12,886.4	3
Sant Boi de Llobregat	Baix Llobregat	83,667	21.5	3,896.9	3
Castelldefels	Baix Llobregat	68,327	12.9	5,309	2
Viladecans	Baix Llobregat	66,615	20.04	3,265.4	2
El Prat de Llobregat	Baix Llobregat	65,409	48.2	2,082.4	2
Cerdanyola del Vallès	Vallès Occidental	57,752	30.6	1,889.8	2
Gavà	Baix Llobregat	47,498	30.8	1,544.7	2
Esplugues de Llobregat	Baix Llobregat	46,968	4.6	10,210.4	2
Sant Feliu de Llobregat	Baix Llobregat	45,956	11.8	3,888	2
Ripollet	Vallès Occidental	39,189	4.3	9,050.6	2
Sant Adrià de Besòs	Barcelonès	37,906	3.8	9,923	2
Montcada i Reixac	Vallès Occidental	36,823	23.5	1,568.9	2
Sant Joan Despí	Baix Llobregat	34,552	6.2	5,600	2
Barberà del Vallès	Vallès Occidental	33,353	8.3	4,013.6	2
Sant Vicenç dels Horts	Baix Llobregat	28,422	9.1	3,116.4	2
Sant Andreu de la Barca	Baix Llobregat	26,862	5.5	4,884	2
Molins de Rei	Baix Llobregat	26,568	15.91	1,666.8	2
Sant Just Desvern	Baix Llobregat	20,478	7.8	2,622	1
Corbera de Llobregat	Baix Llobregat	15,529	18.4	843.5	1
Badia del Vallès	Vallès Occidental	13,055	0.9	14,037.6	1
Castellbisbal	Vallès Occidental	12,811	31	412.9	1
Montgat	Maresme	12,458	2.9	4,281.1	1
Pallejà	Baix Llobregat	11,715	8.3	1,411.5	1
Cervelló	Baix Llobregat	9,461	24.1	392.6	1
Tiana	Maresme	9,220	8	1,159.8	1
Santa Coloma de Cervelló	Baix Llobregat	8,373	7.5	1,117.9	1
Begues	Baix Llobregat	7,429	50.4	147.3	1
Torrelles de Llobregat	Baix Llobregat	6,217	13.6	458.5	1
El Papiol	Baix Llobregat	4,318	9	482.5	1
Sant Climent de Llobregat	Baix Llobregat	4,190	10.8	387.6	1
La Palma de Cervelló	Baix Llobregat	3,036	5.5	556	1
Totals		3,347,881	636		90

== Metropolitan government ==
=== Metropolitan Council ===
The Metropolitan Council is the highest governing body of the AMB. Its responsibilities include the appointment and dismissal of the AMB presidency; the approval of the Metropolitan Action Plan, which includes projects and services developed by the AMB during the term; the approval of laws and regulations, as well as the establishment of the metropolitan services fees.

The Metropolitan Council currently comprises 90 metropolitan councillors. Each of the 36 municipalities has a number of members in proportion to their demographic weight. The mayors of the municipalities are ex officio members of the Council, in addition to the councillors appointed by the Town Councils whose number increases until covering the one stipulated for each municipality.

==== Results to the Metropolitan Council ====
Key to parties CUP GBeC ICV–EUiA Entesa ECG ECP–C ERC Minor local parties PSC CiU JxCat Junts BCN Canvi/Valents Cs PP Vox
Election	Distribution	President	Executive VP
2011	11 / 2 / 1 / 43 / 22 / 11	Xavier Trias (CDC)	Antonio Balmón (PSC)
2015	9 / 18 / 8 / 2 / 33 / 12 / 4 / 4	Ada Colau (BComú)	Antonio Balmón (PSC)
2019	1 / 16 / 13 / 2 / 44 / 8 / 2 / 2 / 2	Ada Colau (BComú)	Antonio Balmón (PSC)
2023	10 / 8 / 3 / 46 / 14 / 8 / 1	Jaume Collboni (PSC)	Antonio Balmón (PSC)

=== Governing Board ===
The Governing Board is the body that assists the president in the everyday work of the metropolitan administration.

Tasks are delegated by the Metropolitan Council and the president, with the aim of facilitating the decision making and the work of the metropolitan administration.

The Governing Board comprises the AMB president and the metropolitan councillors appointed by the president at the proposal of the Metropolitan Council, and it meets at least twice a month.

==== Members of the Governing Board 2023–2027 ====
Office	Officeholder	Party	Municipality
President	Jaume Collboni	PSC–CP	Barcelona
Executive Vice-president	Antonio Balmón Arévalo	PSC–CP	Cornellà de Llobregat
Vice-president for Urban Planning Policies and Natural Areas	Damià Calvet	Junts	Barcelona
Vice-president for Mobility, Transport and Sustainability	Carlos Cordón Núñez	PSC–CP	Cerdanyola del Vallès
Vice-president for Water Cycle and Analysis of Metropolitan Policies	Belén García Criado	PSC–CP	Sant Joan Despí
Vice-president for Social and Economic Development	Jordi Valls Riera	PSC–CP	Barcelona
Vice-president for International Relations and Digital Metropolis	Elisenda Alamany	ERC	Barcelona
Vice-president for Climate Action and Metropolitan Strategic Agenda	Janet Sanz Cid	ECP–C	Barcelona
Vice-president	Lluís Mijoler Martínez	ECP–C	El Prat de Llobregat
Vice-president	Marc Giribet Gavara	ERC	Sant Andreu de la Barca
Vice-president	Anna Pascual Roca	Junts	La Palma de Cervelló
Councilmember	Luís Manuel Tirado García	PSC–CP	Ripollet
Councilmember	Antoni Lluis Suárez Pizarro	PSC–CP	Santa Coloma de Gramenet
Councilmember	Jesús Husillos Gutiérrez	PSC–CP	L'Hospitalet de Llobregat
Councilmember	Lourdes Borrell Moreno	PSC–CP	Sant Feliu de Llobregat
Councilmember	Ramon Tremosa	Junts	Barcelona
Councilmember	Guillermo López Ginés	ECP–C	Barcelona
Councilmember	Jaume Graells i Veguin	ERC	L'Hospitalet de Llobregat

== See also ==
- Barcelona metropolitan area
- Catalonia
- Comarques of Catalonia
- Local government in Spain
