= 2004 Volta a Catalunya =

Race details
- Dates: 14–20 June 2004
- Stages: 7
- Distance: 838.1 km (520.8 mi)
- Winning time: 20h 39' 44"

Results
| | Winner | Miguel Ángel Martín Perdiguero (ESP) | (Saunier Duval–Prodir) |
| | Second | Vladimir Karpets (RUS) | (Illes Balears–Banesto) |
| | Third | Roberto Laiseka (ESP) | (Euskaltel–Euskadi) |
| | Points | Miguel Ángel Martín Perdiguero (ESP) | (Saunier Duval–Prodir) |
| | Mountains | Miguel Ángel Martín Perdiguero (ESP) | (Saunier Duval–Prodir) |
| | Sprints | David Fernández (ESP) | (Costa de Almería–Paternina) |
| | Team | Comunidad Valenciana–Kelme | |

The 2004 Volta a Catalunya was the 84th edition of the Volta a Catalunya cycle race and was held from 14 June to 20 June 2004. The race started in Salou and finished in Barcelona. The race was won by Miguel Ángel Martín Perdiguero of the Saunier Duval–Prodir team.

== Teams ==
Fifteen teams of up to eight riders started the race:

- Lampre
- Liberty Seguros
- Fassa Bortolo
- Relax–Bodysol
- U.S. Postal Service
- Illes Balears–Banesto
- De Nardi–Piemme Telekom
- Comunidad Valenciana–Kelme
- Saunier Duval–Prodir
- Acqua & Sapone
- Cofidis
- Costa de Almería–Paternina
- Cafés Baqué
- Euskaltel–Euskadi
- Gerolsteiner

== Route ==
Stage characteristics and winners
| Stage | Date | Course | Distance | Type | Winner |
|---|---|---|---|---|---|
| 1 | 14 June | Salou to Salou | 18.1 km (11.2 mi) | Team time trial | Illes Balears–Banesto |
| 2 | 15 June | Salou to Horta de Sant Joan | 145.4 km (90.3 mi) | | Miguel Ángel Martín Perdiguero (ESP) |
| 3 | 16 June | Les Borges Blanques to Col de Pal | 200.7 km (124.7 mi) | | Miguel Ángel Martín Perdiguero (ESP) |
| 4 | 17 June | Llorts to Ordino-Arcalis | 12.4 km (7.7 mi) | Individual time trial | Miguel Ángel Martín Perdiguero (ESP) |
| 5 | 18 June | Llívia to Blanes | 180.8 km (112.3 mi) | | Danilo Hondo (GER) |
| 6 | 19 June | Blanes to Vallirana | 148.1 km (92.0 mi) | | Max van Heeswijk (NED) |
| 7 | 20 June | Olesa de Montserrat to Barcelona | 132.8 km (82.5 mi) | | Isaac Gálvez (ESP) |

== Stages ==
=== Stage 1 ===
14 June 2004 – Salou to Salou, 18.1 km (11.2 mi) (TTT)

| Rank | Team | Time |
|---|---|---|
| 1 | Illes Balears–Banesto | 20' 07" |
| 2 | Liberty Seguros | + 6" |
| 3 | Gerolsteiner | + 15" |

=== Stage 2 ===
15 June 2004 – Salou to Horta de Sant Joan, 145.4 km (90.3 mi)

| Rank | Rider | Team | Time |
|---|---|---|---|
| 1 | Miguel Ángel Martín Perdiguero (ESP) | Saunier Duval–Prodir | 3h 46' 25" |
| 2 | Vladimir Karpets (RUS) | Illes Balears–Banesto | + 4" |
| 3 | Max Van Heeswijk (NED) | U.S. Postal Service | + 6" |

=== Stage 3 ===
16 June 2004 – Les Borges Blanques to Col de Pal, 200.7 km (124.7 mi)

| Rank | Rider | Team | Time |
|---|---|---|---|
| 1 | Miguel Ángel Martín Perdiguero (ESP) | Saunier Duval–Prodir | 5h 43' 46" |
| 2 | Eladio Jiménez (ESP) | Comunidad Valenciana–Kelme | + 3" |
| 3 | Roberto Laiseka (ESP) | Euskaltel–Euskadi | + 6" |

=== Stage 4 ===
17 June 2004 – Llorts to Ordino-Arcalis, 12.4 km (7.7 mi)

| Rank | Rider | Team | Time |
|---|---|---|---|
| 1 | Miguel Ángel Martín Perdiguero (ESP) | Saunier Duval–Prodir | 30' 46" |
| 2 | Roberto Laiseka (ESP) | Euskaltel–Euskadi | + 16" |
| 3 | David Latasa (ESP) | Comunidad Valenciana–Kelme | + 19" |

=== Stage 5 ===
18 June 2004 – Llívia to Blanes, 180.8 km (112.3 mi)

| Rank | Rider | Team | Time |
|---|---|---|---|
| 1 | Danilo Hondo (GER) | Gerolsteiner | 4h 14' 43" |
| 2 | René Haselbacher (AUT) | Gerolsteiner | s.t. |
| 3 | Crescenzo D'Amore (ITA) | Acqua & Sapone | s.t. |

=== Stage 6 ===
19 June 2004 – Blanes to Vallirana, 148.1 km (92.0 mi)

| Rank | Rider | Team | Time |
|---|---|---|---|
| 1 | Max van Heeswijk (NED) | U.S. Postal Service | 3h 06' 03" |
| 2 | Allan Davis (AUS) | Liberty Seguros | s.t. |
| 3 | Miguel Ángel Martín Perdiguero (ESP) | Saunier Duval–Prodir | + 1" |

=== Stage 7 ===
20 June 2004 – Olesa de Montserrat to Barcelona, 132.8 km (82.5 mi)

| Rank | Rider | Team | Time |
|---|---|---|---|
| 1 | Isaac Gálvez (ESP) | Illes Balears–Banesto | 2h 57' 49" |
| 2 | Mirco Lorenzetto (ITA) | De Nardi–Piemme Telekom | s.t. |
| 3 | Danilo Hondo (GER) | Gerolsteiner | s.t. |

== General classification ==
Final general classification

| Rank | Rider | Team | Time |
|---|---|---|---|
| 1 | Miguel Ángel Martín Perdiguero (ESP) | Saunier Duval–Prodir | 20h 39' 44" |
| 2 | Vladimir Karpets (RUS) | Illes Balears–Banesto | + 28" |
| 3 | Roberto Laiseka (ESP) | Euskaltel–Euskadi | + 41" |
| 4 | David Latasa (ESP) | Comunidad Valenciana–Kelme | + 1' 00" |
| 5 | Eladio Jiménez (ESP) | Comunidad Valenciana–Kelme | + 1' 19" |
| 6 | Iván Parra (COL) | Comunidad Valenciana–Kelme | + 1' 28" |
| 7 | Alberto López de Munain (ESP) | Euskaltel–Euskadi | + 2' 17" |
| 8 | Josep Jufré (ESP) | Relax–Bodysol | + 2' 17" |
| 9 | Pablo Lastras (ESP) | Illes Balears–Banesto | + 2' 46" |
| 10 | Daniel Atienza (ESP) | Cofidis | + 3' 07" |
