= Sant Ponç, Corbera =

Monastery in Cervelló, Spain

Coordinates: 41°24′7″N 1°54′44″E

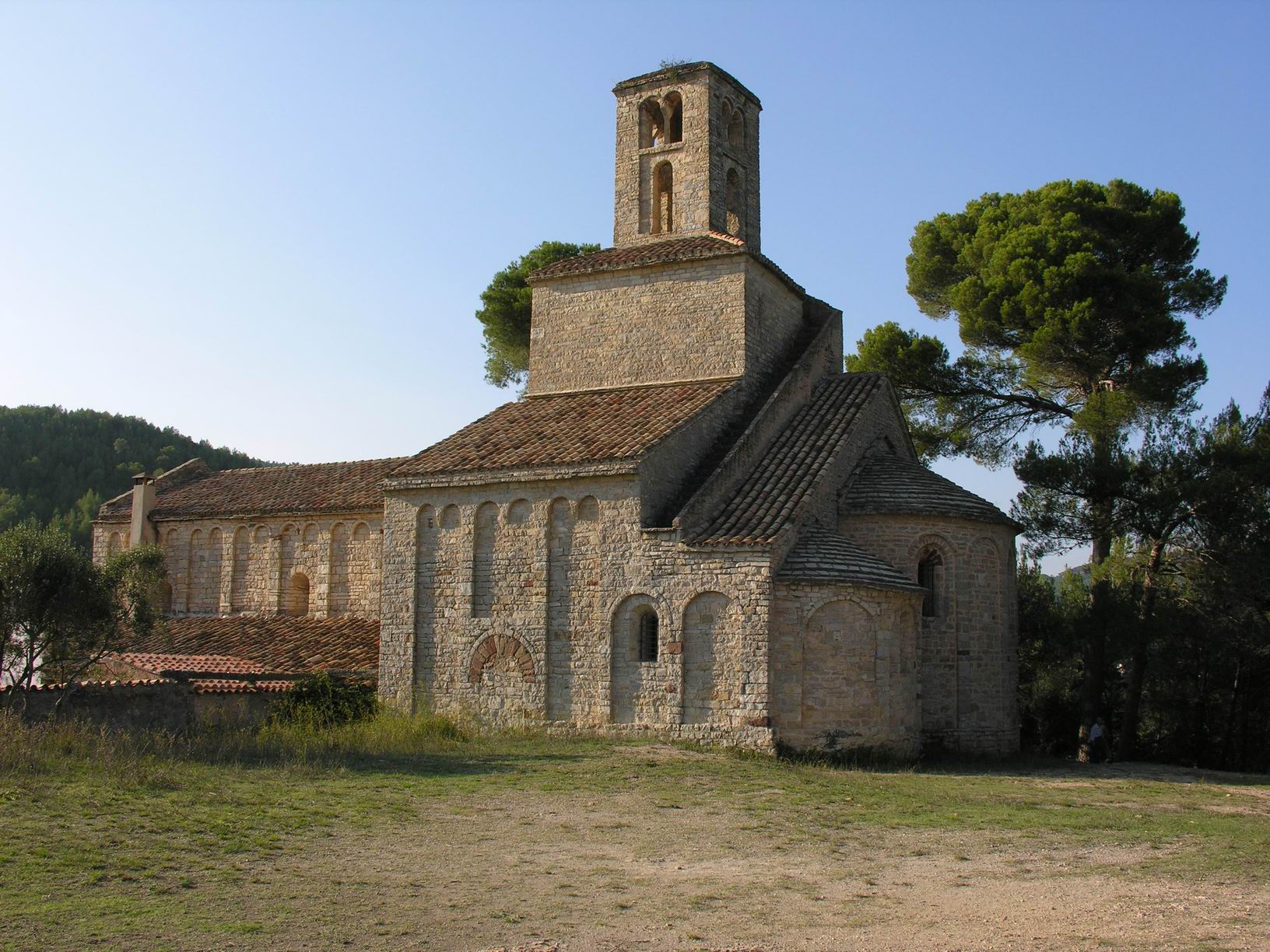
Sant Ponç de Corbera

Sant Ponç de Corbera is a Benedictine Priory, located between Cervelló and Corbera de Llobregat in the Province of Barcelona, Catalonia, Spain. It was declared a Bien de Interés Cultural landmark on 3 June 1931.

== History ==
Although it was mentioned for the first time in 1068, it is believed that the monastic community settled in the place much earlier. It seems that the monastery was built between 1025-50 under the order of Guillem de Mediona of Corbera.

In 1096, it was governed by Abbot Salomó, and depended on Cluny Abbey, through the monastery of Sant Pere de Casserres. In 1590, it joined the congregation of Tarragonés and then the monastery of San Pablo del Campo, which in 1835 was effected by the Ecclesiastical Confiscations of Mendizábal.

On 3 June 1931 the monastery became a Bien de Interés Cultural site.

== Building ==
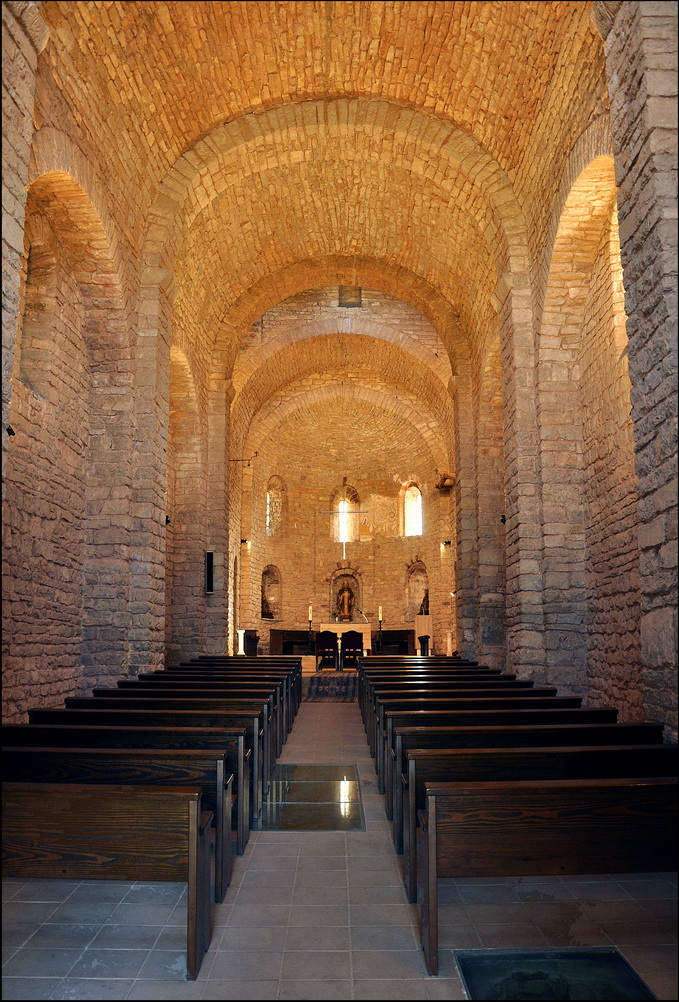
Internal view

The building has a single nave covered with a barrel vault, a transept, and three apses externally decorated with arches and pilasters. Two apses are connected by open doors in the walls. The dome is topped by a small square bell tower with two-story windows. Remains of Roman wall paintings are preserved, with plant motifs. Other decorations include two linked plant stems in a figure eight, a wolf, and a bird with open wings. On the gospel apse, there are plant motifs as part of a frieze. This decoration is of a later period. Inside is a polychrome statue of the Virgin of the Llet, dated to the 13th century. The building underwent restoration in 1929 and 1992.

== See also ==
- High medieval domes
