= Bruguers =

- Village
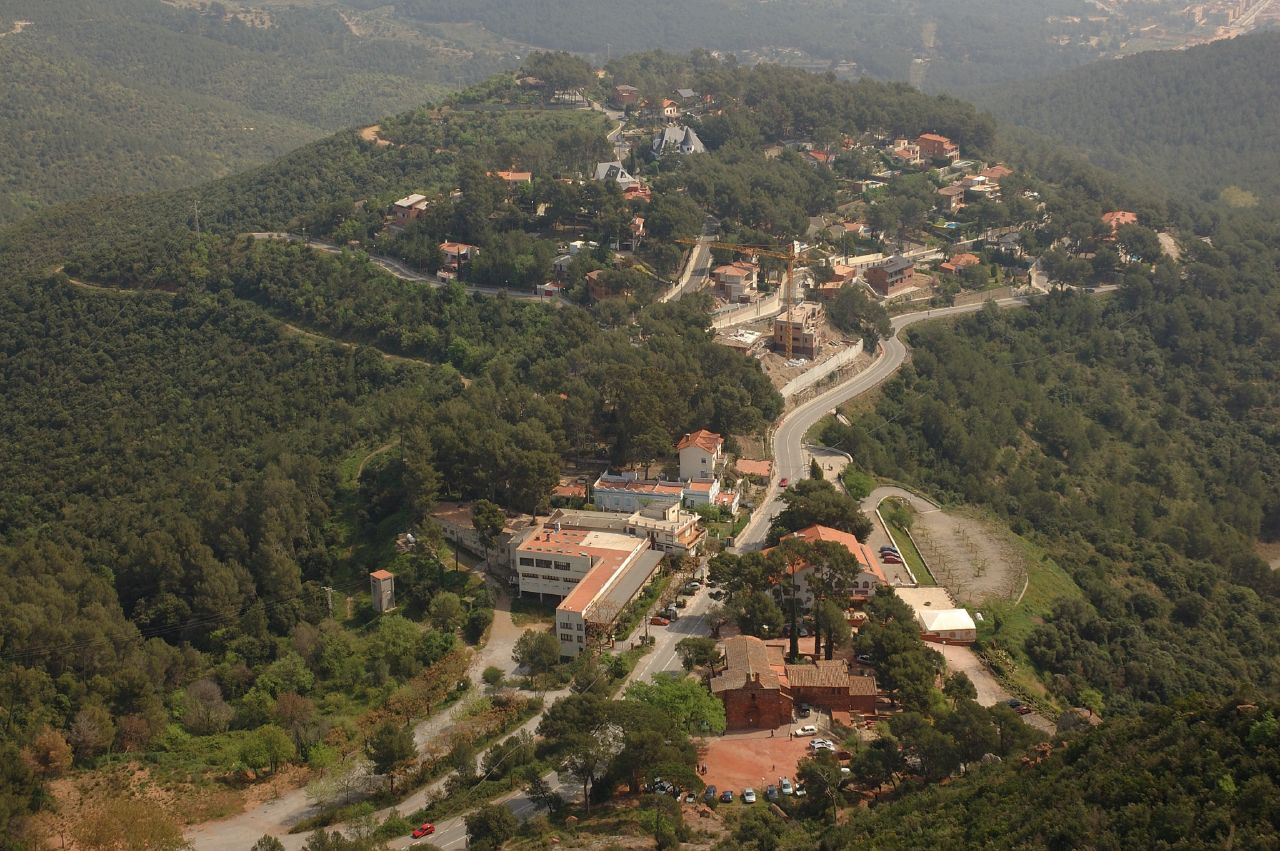
- Aerial view of Bruguers, with the Hermitage near bottom center

- Location within Province of Barcelona Location within Catalonia Location within Spain
- Coordinates: 41°18′56.05″N 1°58′03.70″E
- Country: Spain
- Autonomous community: Catalonia
- Province: Barcelona
- Comarca: Baix Llobregat
- Municipality: Gavà
- Elevation: 254 m (833 ft)

Bruguers is a village within the municipality of Gavà in the comarca of Baix Llobregat, province of Barcelona, Catalonia, Spain. It lies halfway between the towns of Begues and Gavà.

A notable item in Bruguers is the Ermita de Bruguers, also known as the Mare de Déu de Bruguers or Church of Mary at Bruguers. This 13th-century Romanesque church complex contains an effigy of the Virgin Mary from the 14th century.

The GR 92 long-distance footpath, which roughly follows the length of the Mediterranean coast of Spain, has a staging point at Bruguers. Stage 20 links northwards to Sant Vicenç dels Horts, a distance of 16.2 kilometres (10.1 mi), whilst stage 21 links southwards to Garraf, a distance of 15.6 kilometres (9.7 mi).

== Gallery ==
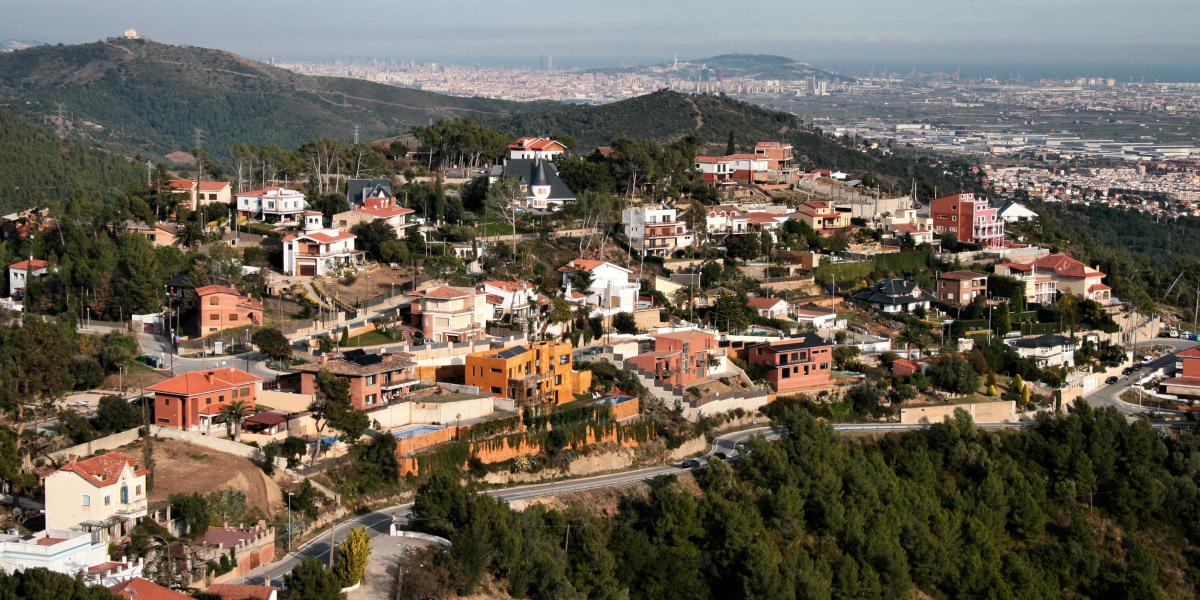
The village, with Barcelona city in distance

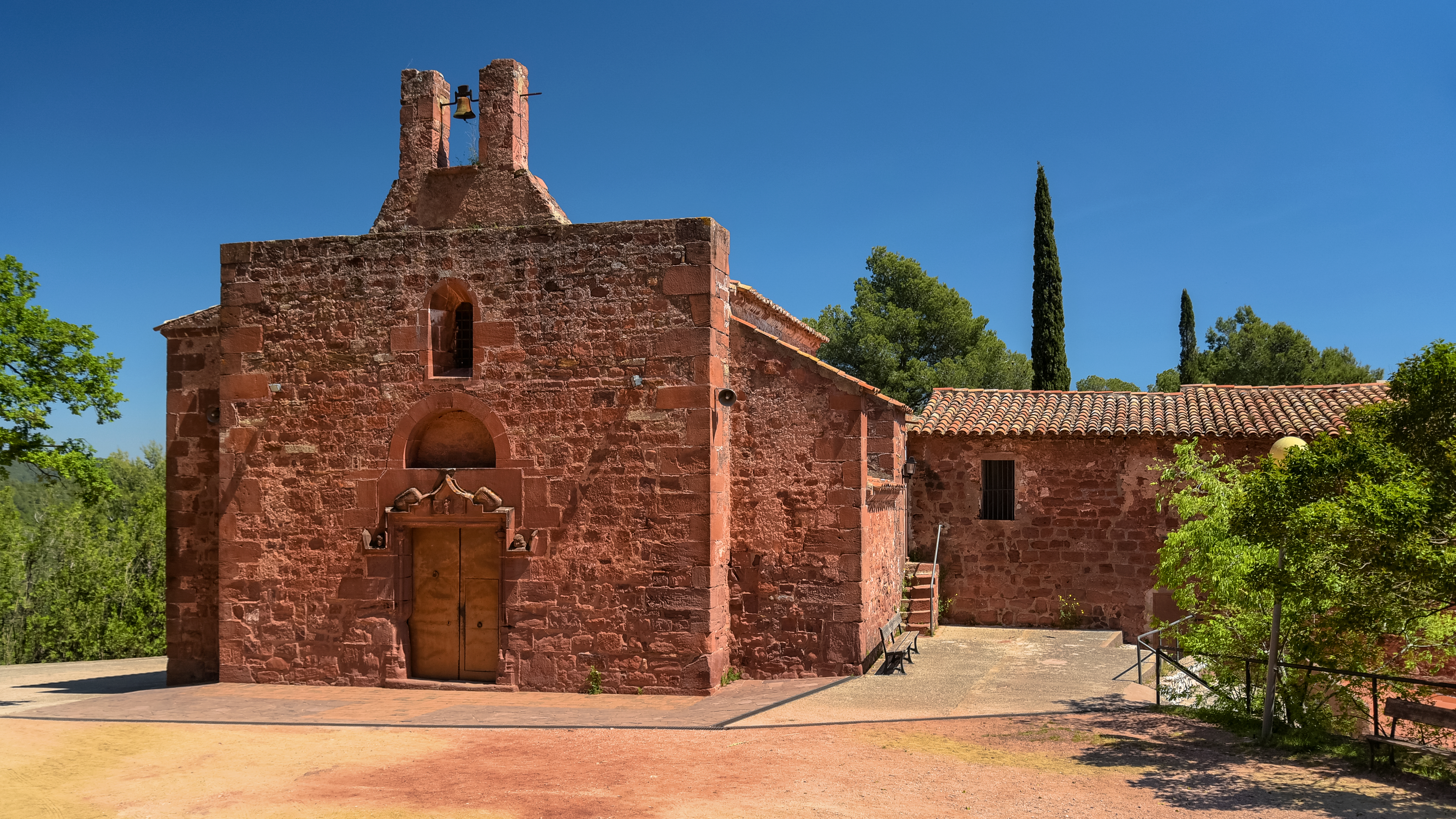
Church of Mary at Bruguers
