= Church of Colònia Güell =

Coordinates: 41°21′48.9″N 2°1′40.5″E

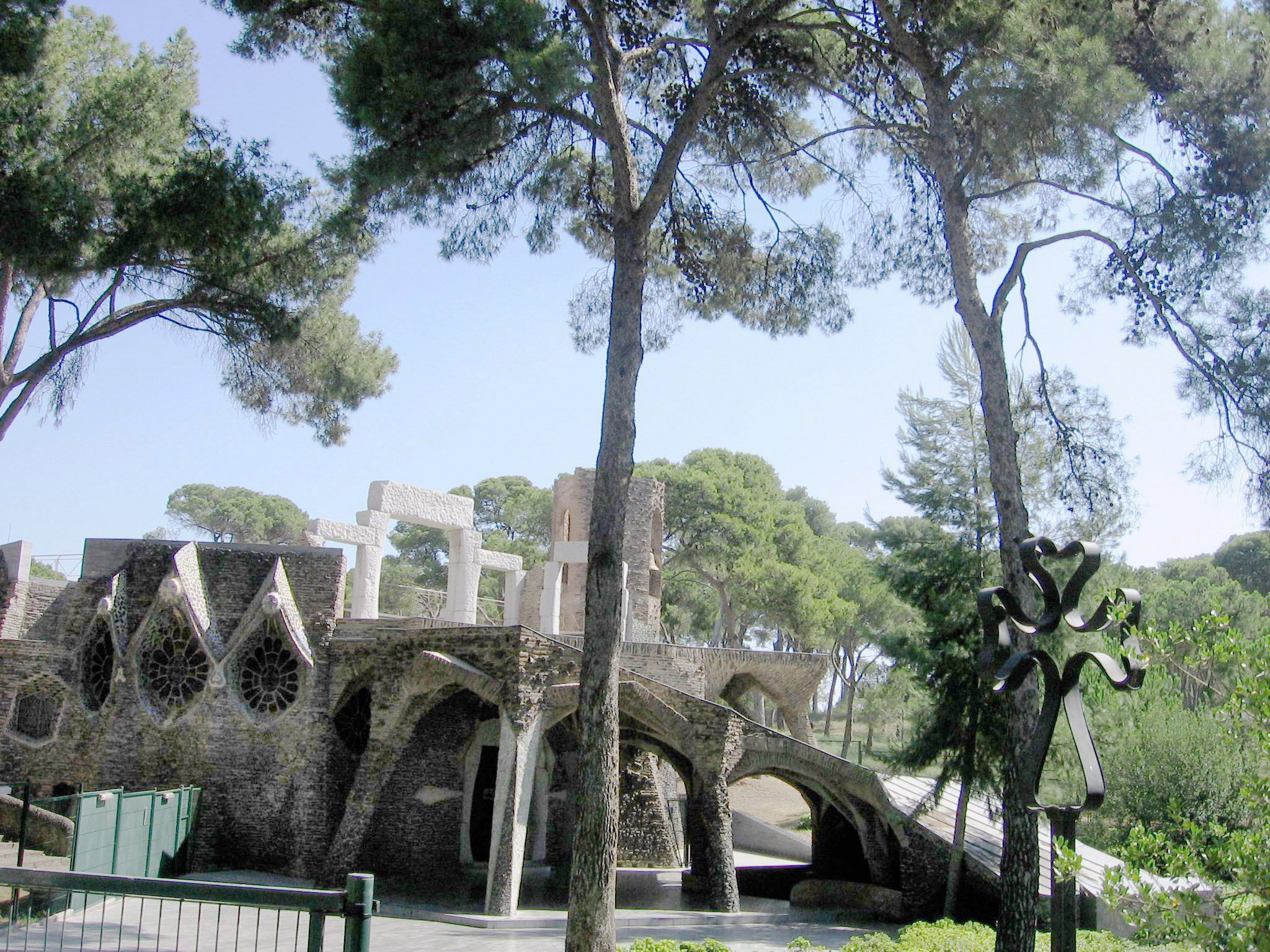
- Crypt portion of the church
- Interactive map of the Church of Colònia Güell area

General information
- Location: Santa Coloma de Cervelló (Province of Barcelona), Spain
- Construction started: 1898
- Construction stopped: 1914

Design and construction
- Architect: Antoni Gaudí

UNESCO World Heritage Site
- Part of: Works of Antoni Gaudí
- Criteria: Cultural: (i), (ii), (iv)
- Reference: 320-007
- Inscription: 1984 (8th Session)
- Extensions: 2005

Spanish Cultural Heritage
- Type: Non-movable
- Criteria: Monument
- Designated: 24 July 1969
- Reference no.: RI-51-0003825

The Church of Colònia Güell (Catalan: Cripta de la Colònia Güell, IPA: [ˈkɾiptə ðə lə kuˈlɔniə ˈɣweʎ]) is an unfinished work by Antoni Gaudí. It was built as a place of worship for the people on a hillside in the namesake company town in Santa Coloma de Cervelló, near Barcelona (Catalonia, Spain). Colònia Güell was the brainchild of Count Eusebi de Güell; who enlisted the help of architect Antoni Gaudí in 1898. However, work was not started until 1908, 10 years after commission. The plan for the building consisted of constructing two naves, an upper and a lower, two towers, and one forty-meter-high central dome. In 1914, the Güell family halted construction due to the death of Count Güell. At the time, the lower nave was almost complete so between the years of 1915 and 1917, it was completed and readied for use.

The Church is one of the seven properties Gaudí built near Barcelona that are UNESCO World Heritage Sites. Collectively, these sites are known as the Works of Antoni Gaudí, and show his "exceptional creative contribution to the development of architecture and building technology in the late 19th and early 20th centuries."

== History ==
At the age of 28, the Church of Colònia Güell was one of several commissions Gaudí received from Count Güell in the suburb of Santa Coloma de Cervelló.

=== Planning ===
To start the designing process of the church, Gaudí used his unique process of gravity and rope, known as a funicular system. As seen in the planning of La Sagrada Família, Gaudí hung hemp ropes attached to lead-filled sacks from the ceiling. By doing this, it allowed him to reproduce the curves of the church at a 1:10 scale. Gaudí also used canvas sheets to imitate the vaults and walls of the structure. By weighing down the ropes with lead-filled sacks, it allowed him to see the loads that would be exerted on the actual structure. To turn this hanging structure into his actual design, Gaudí photographed his model, flipped the image, and traced over it while adding some ornament and design. All that remains of the model for Church of Colònia Güell is an image in a book written by architect Josep Francesc Ràfols i Fontanals.

This method of planning led to the development of a new architectural vocabulary, such as hyperbolic paraboloids and hyperboloids, which are prominent elements in many of Gaudi's designs.

== The Crypt ==
The crypt portion of the church, constructed from 1908 to 1915, was the only segment of the church that was fully completed. It was built partially below ground, due to being on a hillside, and it was designed so that it would feel like it belonged in the surrounding nature. There are pillars on the exterior of the crypt, made of many bricks, while others were made of a solid block of stone. The roof of the structure has a geometric shape that is morphed by the connecting of the various pillars.

The crypt is very dimly lit, due to it being built partially underground since the structure is on a hillside. There are however, 22 lead stained glass windows in the crypt, to let in some colorful lighting.

== The Chapel ==
Although it remains unfinished, the chapel is a very important aspect of the church. The designs of the chapel is similar to that of the Sagrada Familia. This is a common theme seen throughout the church, since Gaudí used it in preparation for the building of the Sagrada Familia. He tested many of his ideas and theories here, since Güell gave him the liberty of being as creative as possible.

The shape of the worship area was planned in extensive detail, right down to the pews. All of the furniture in the Church was designed by Gaudí himself, and have been preserved. Very few pieces of his furniture have been saved, though some examples are still seen in the Sagrada Familia and private homes.

== Recent history ==
In 2000, local architects set about repairing the Catalan modernisme buildings and the crypt. This took away aspects of the unfinished nature of the buildings. However, it did present a more tourist-friendly structure, and now visitors can stand on the roof, which would have been the church floor.

== Gallery ==
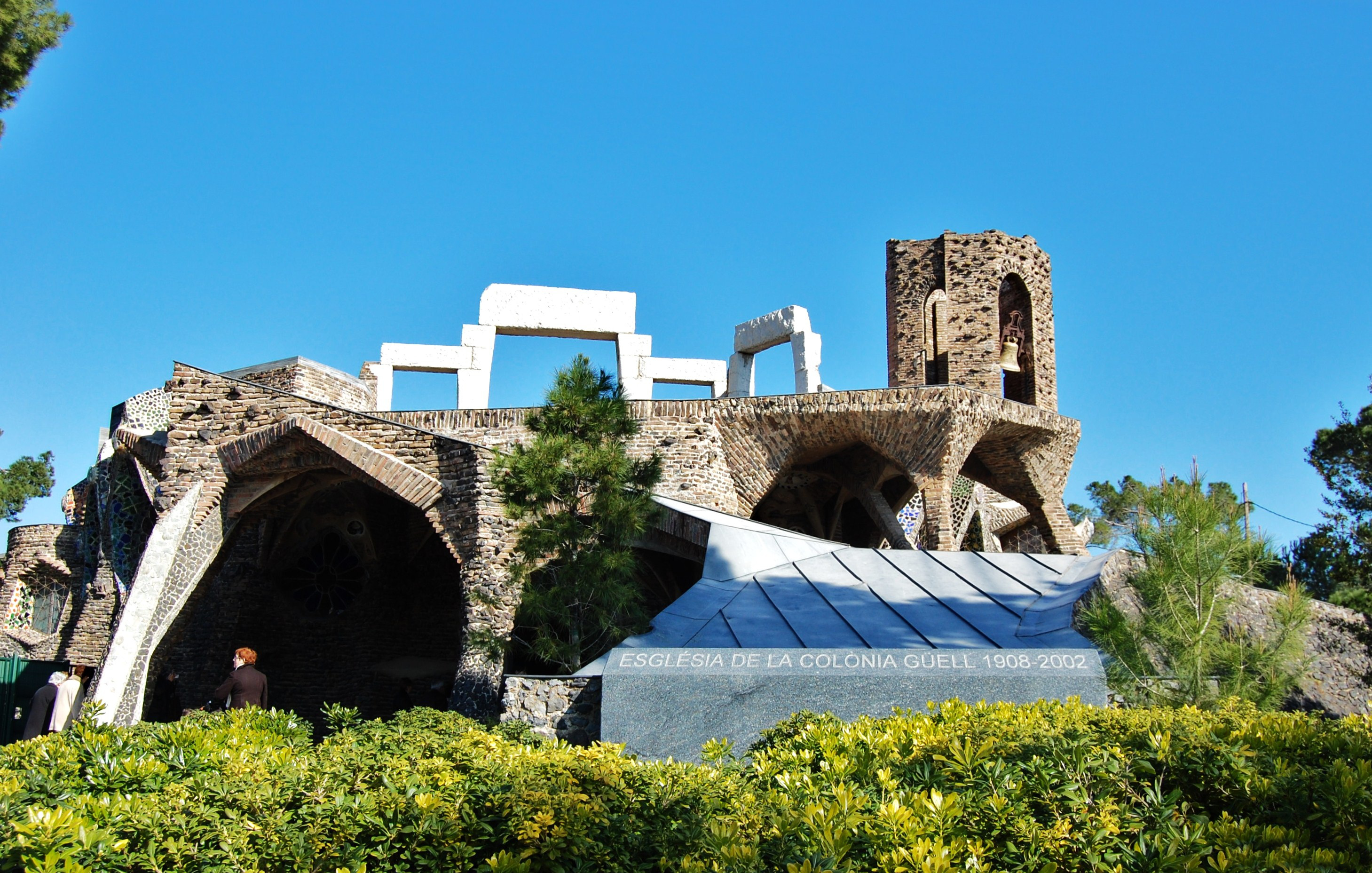
Exterior

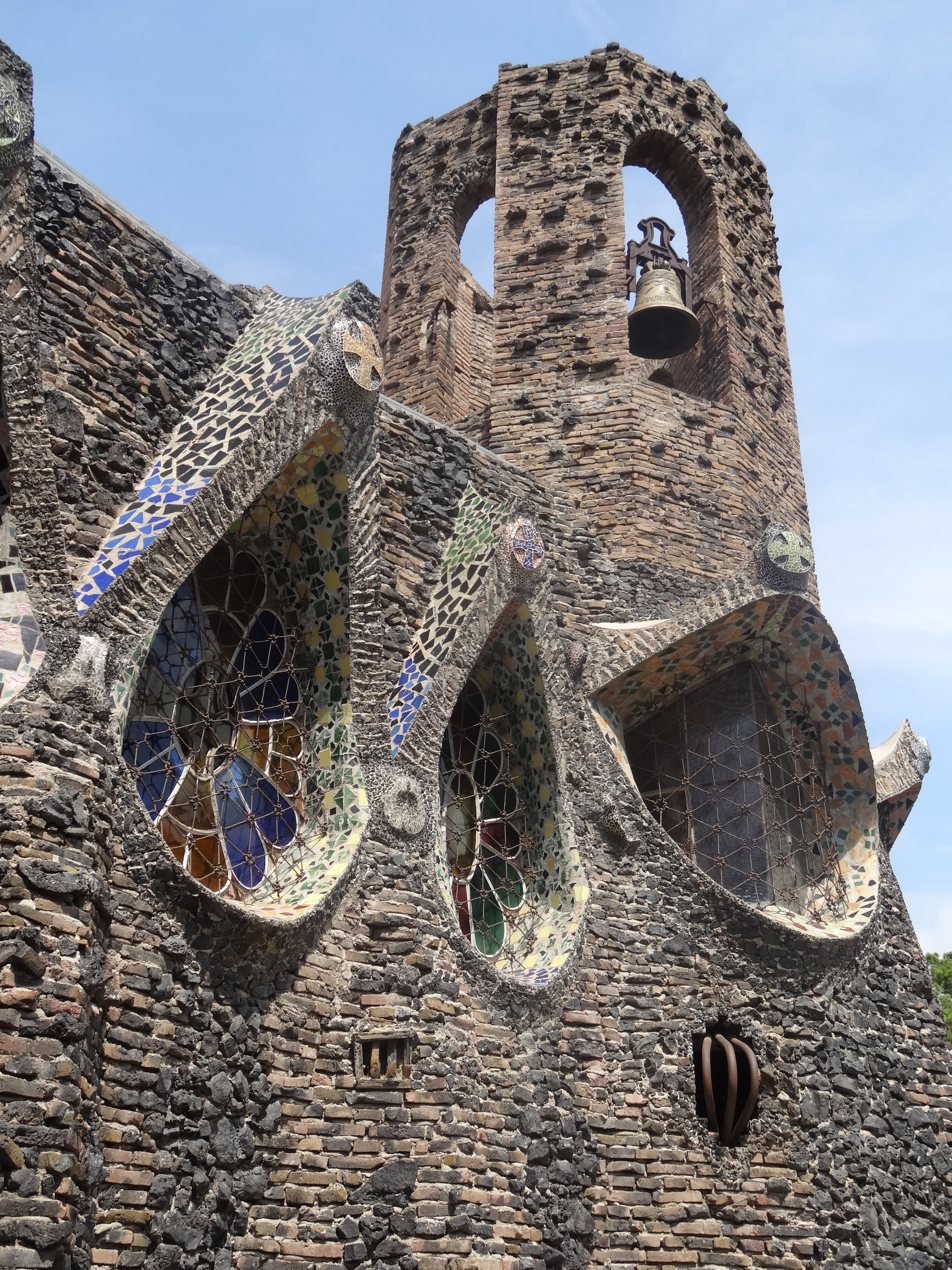
Windows and bell tower

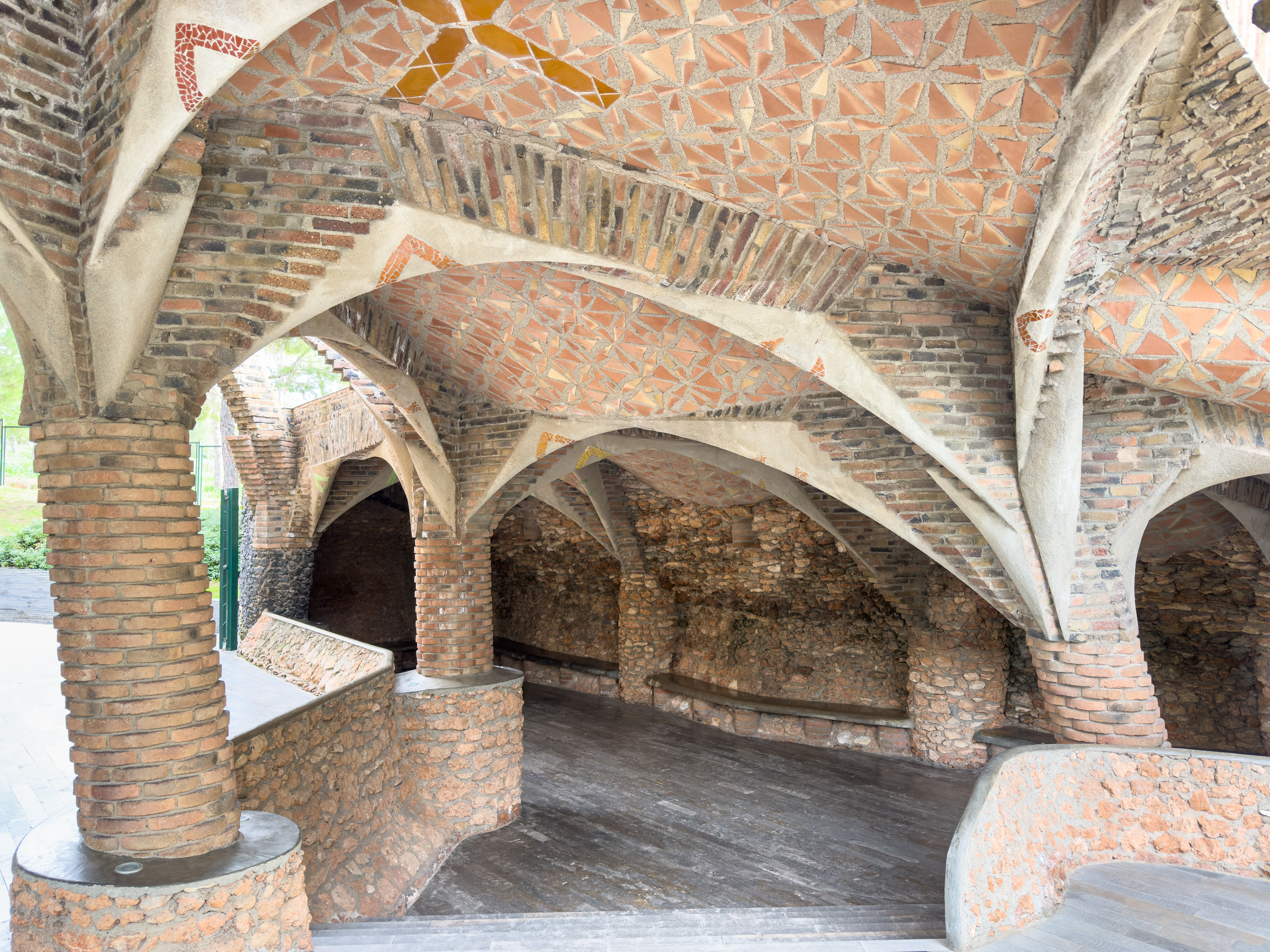
Subportico of the entrance to the crypt

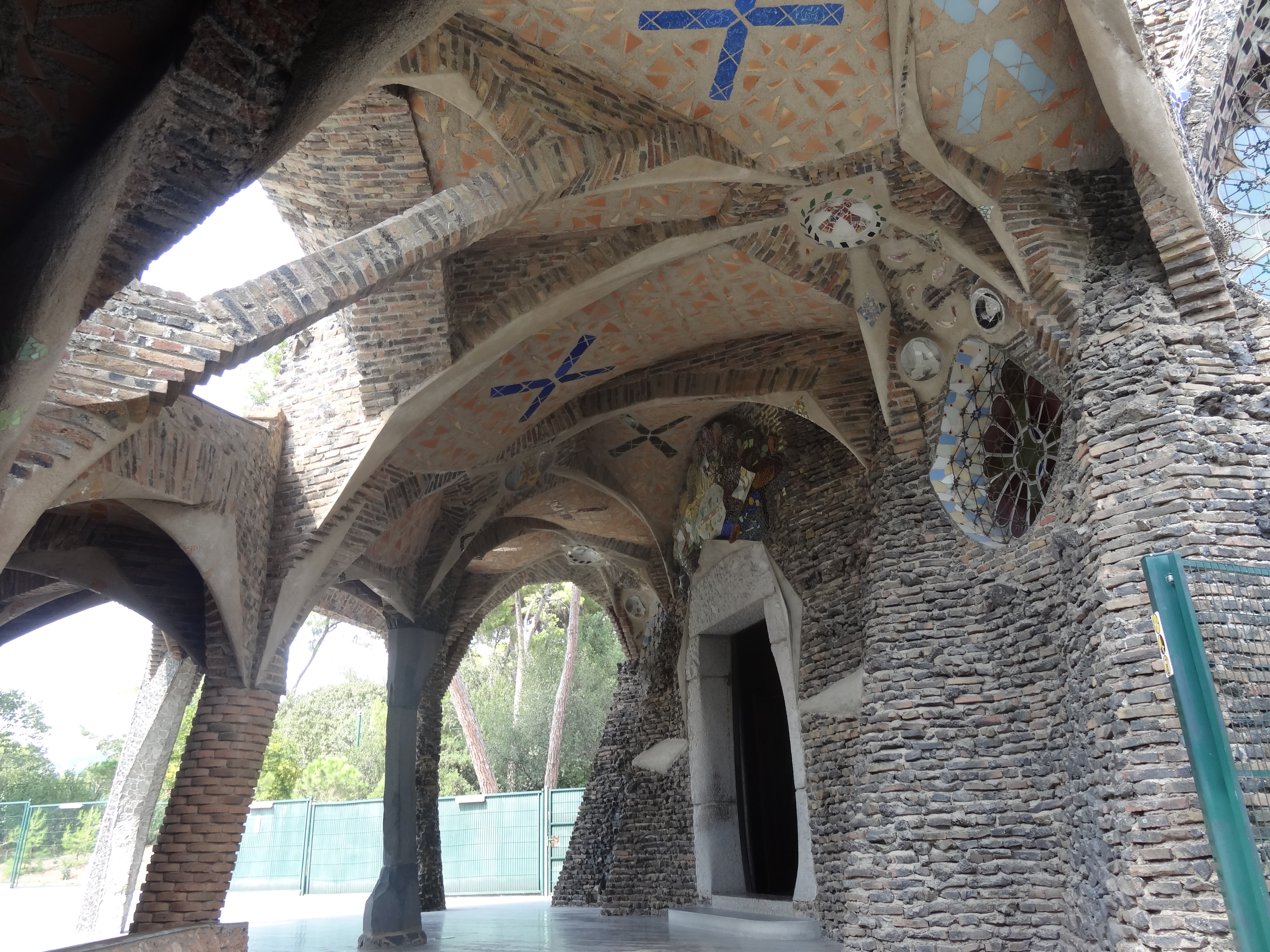
Portico

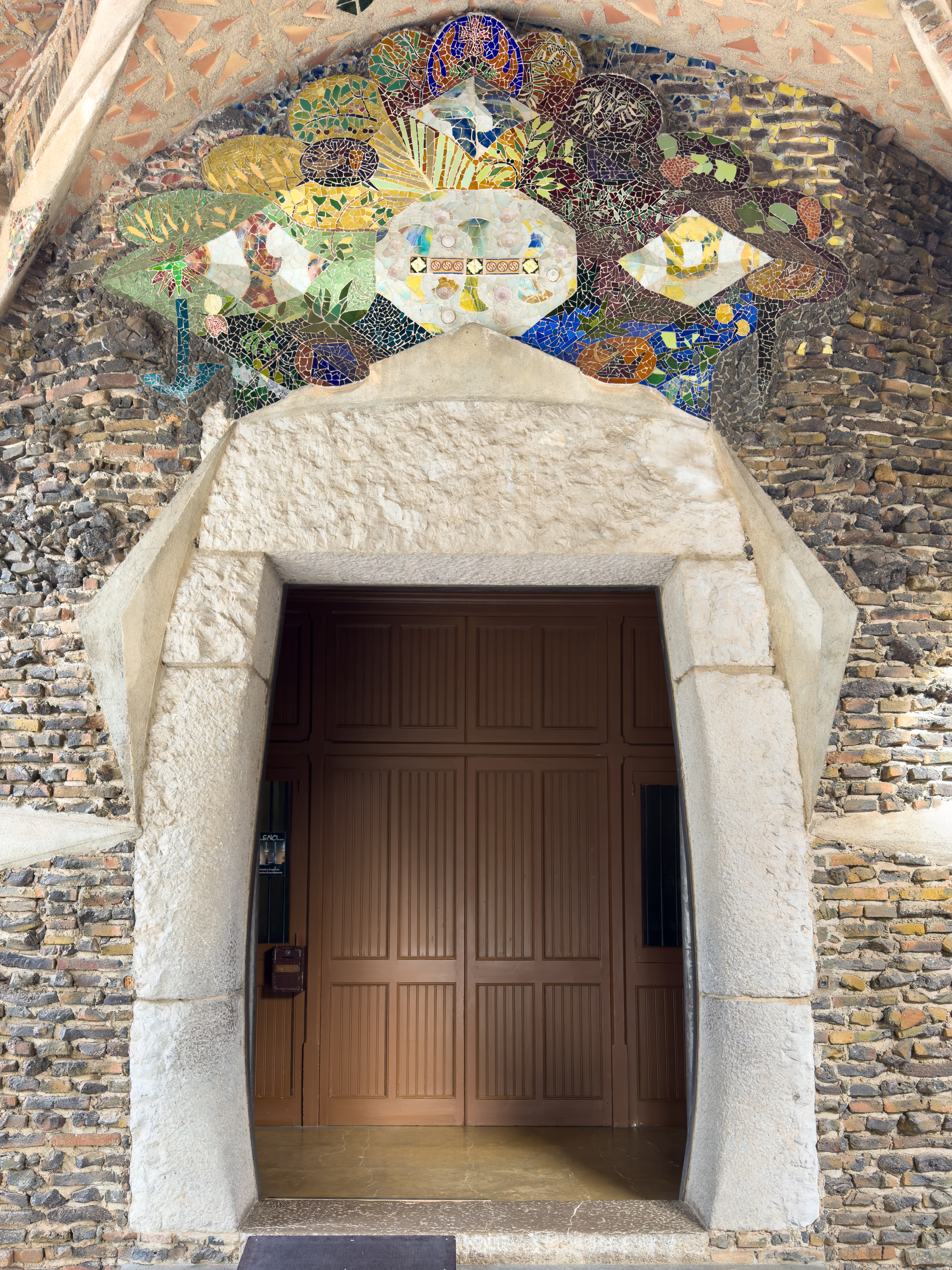
Entrance lintel with ceramic decoration representing the four cardinal virtues

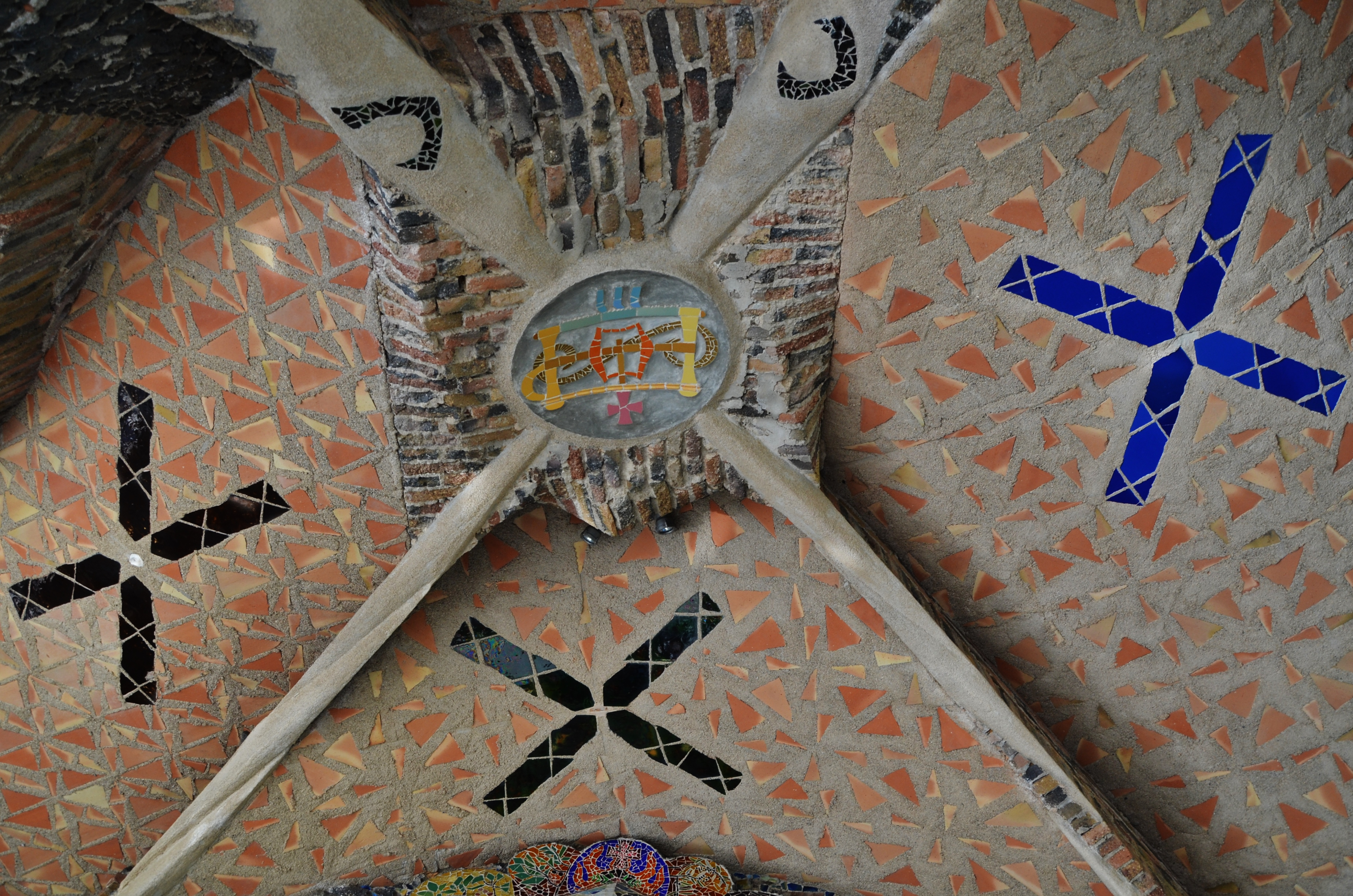
Crosses on the portico ceiling

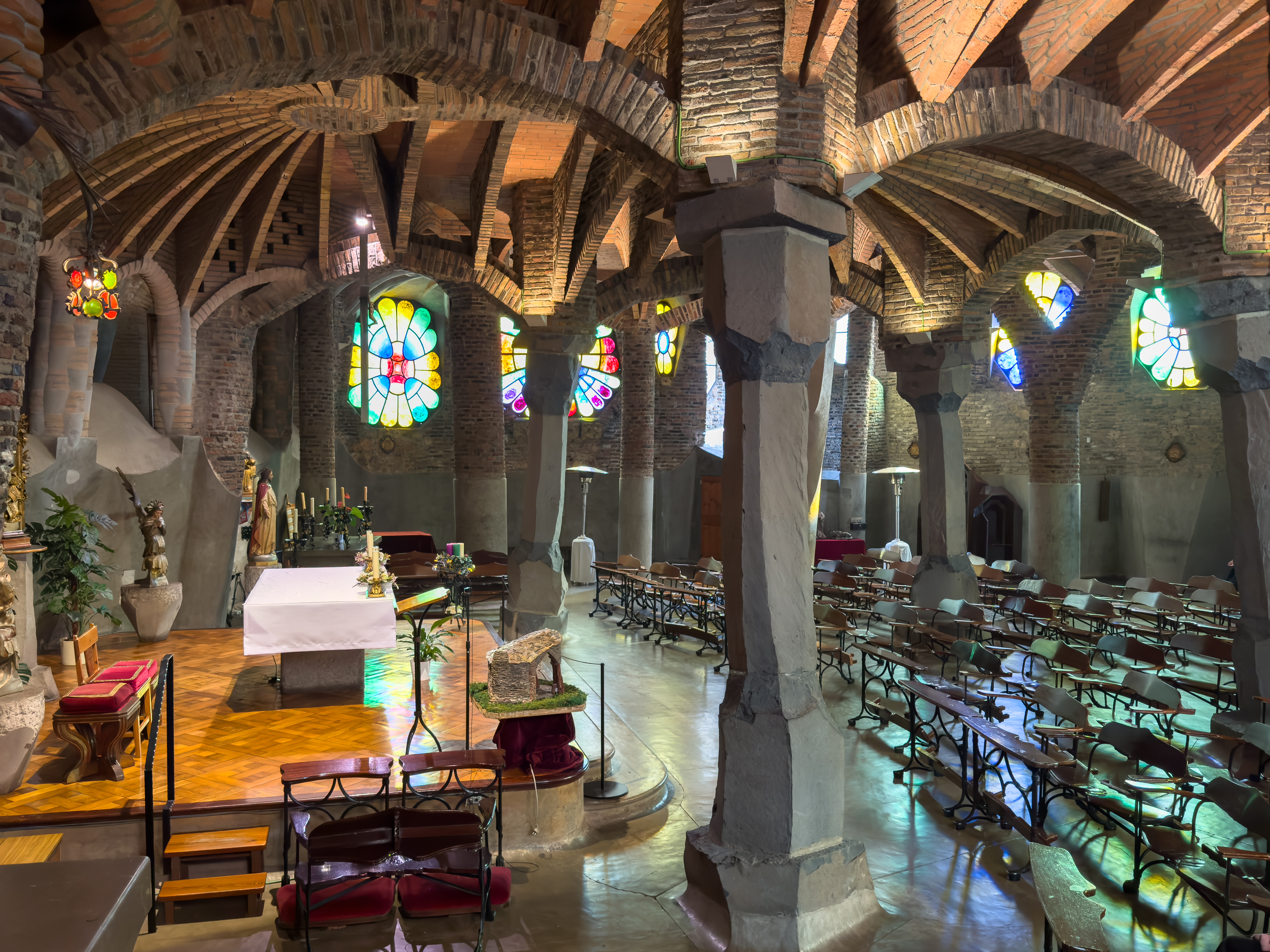
Interior of the crypt

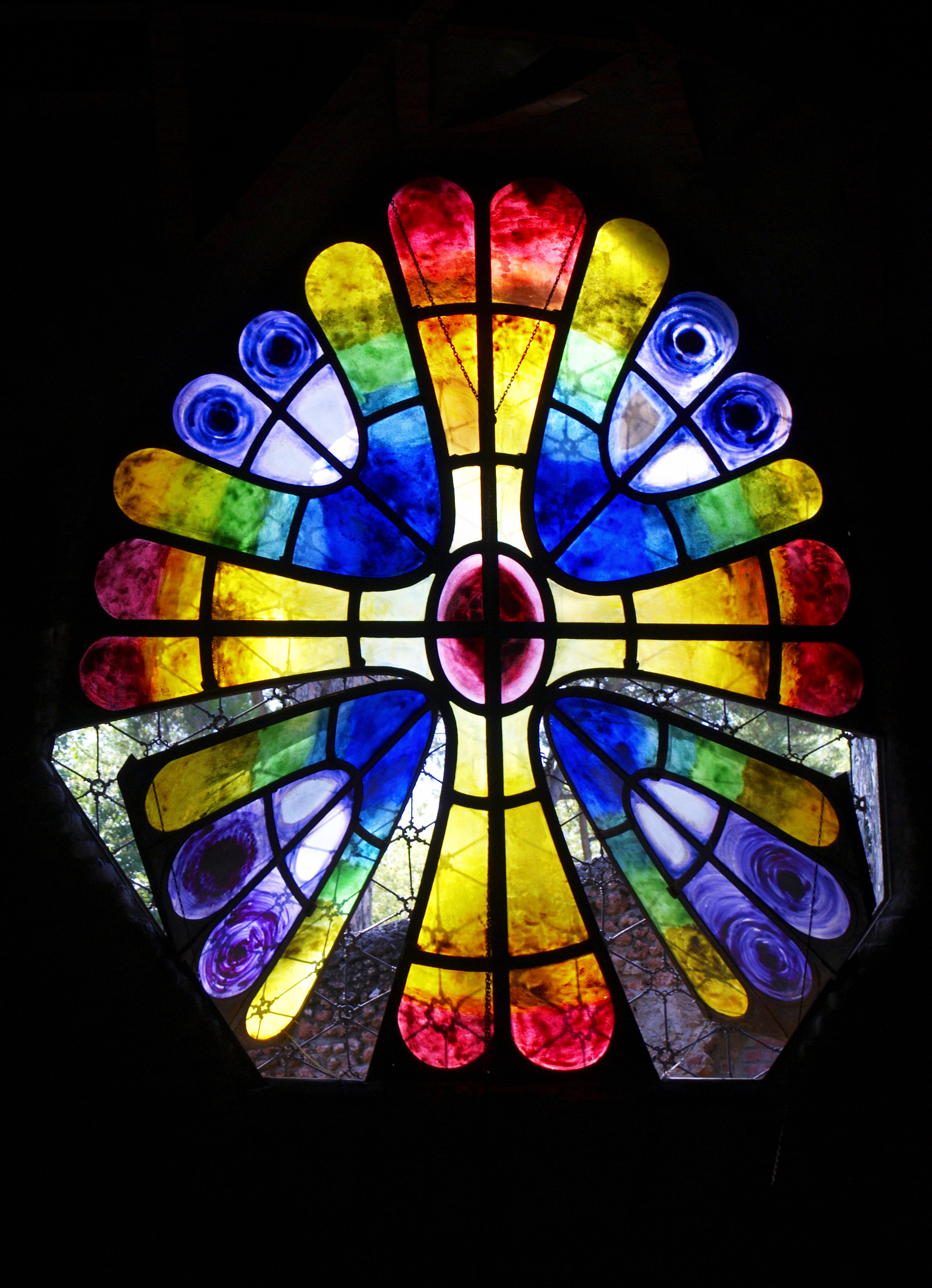
Stained glass window with colored glass in the shape of a butterfly wing

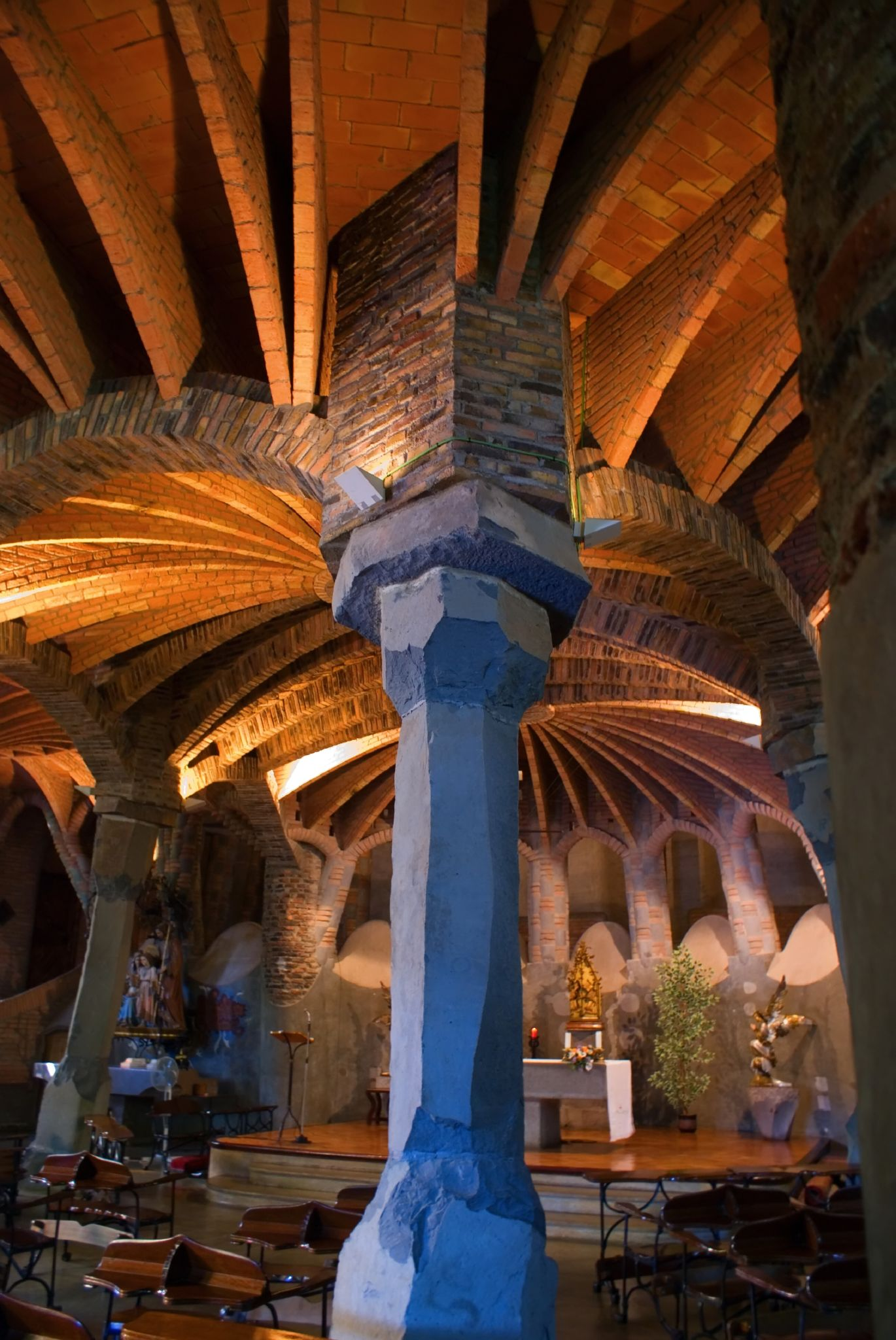
Inclined basalt column from Castellfollit de la Roca

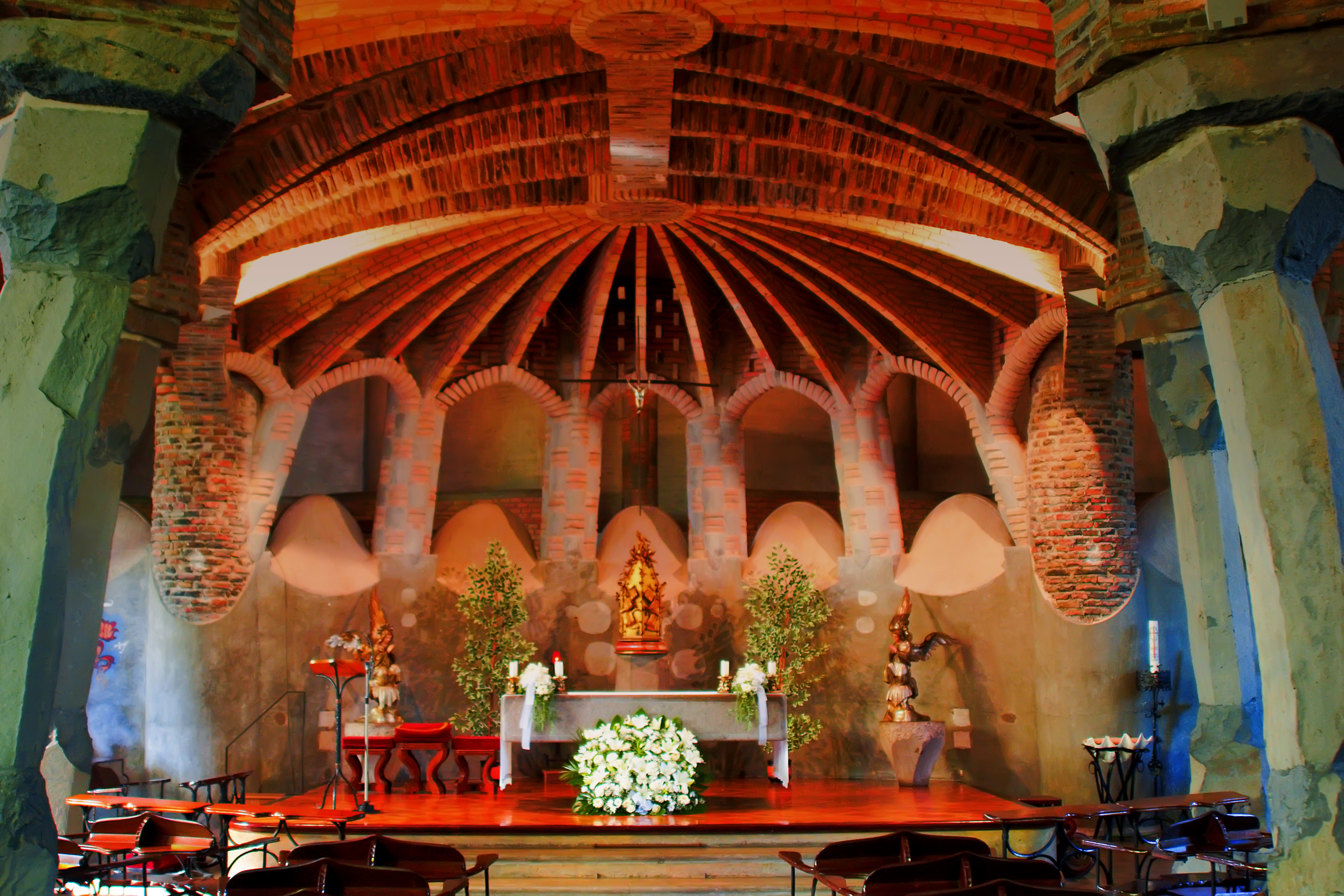
Central altar

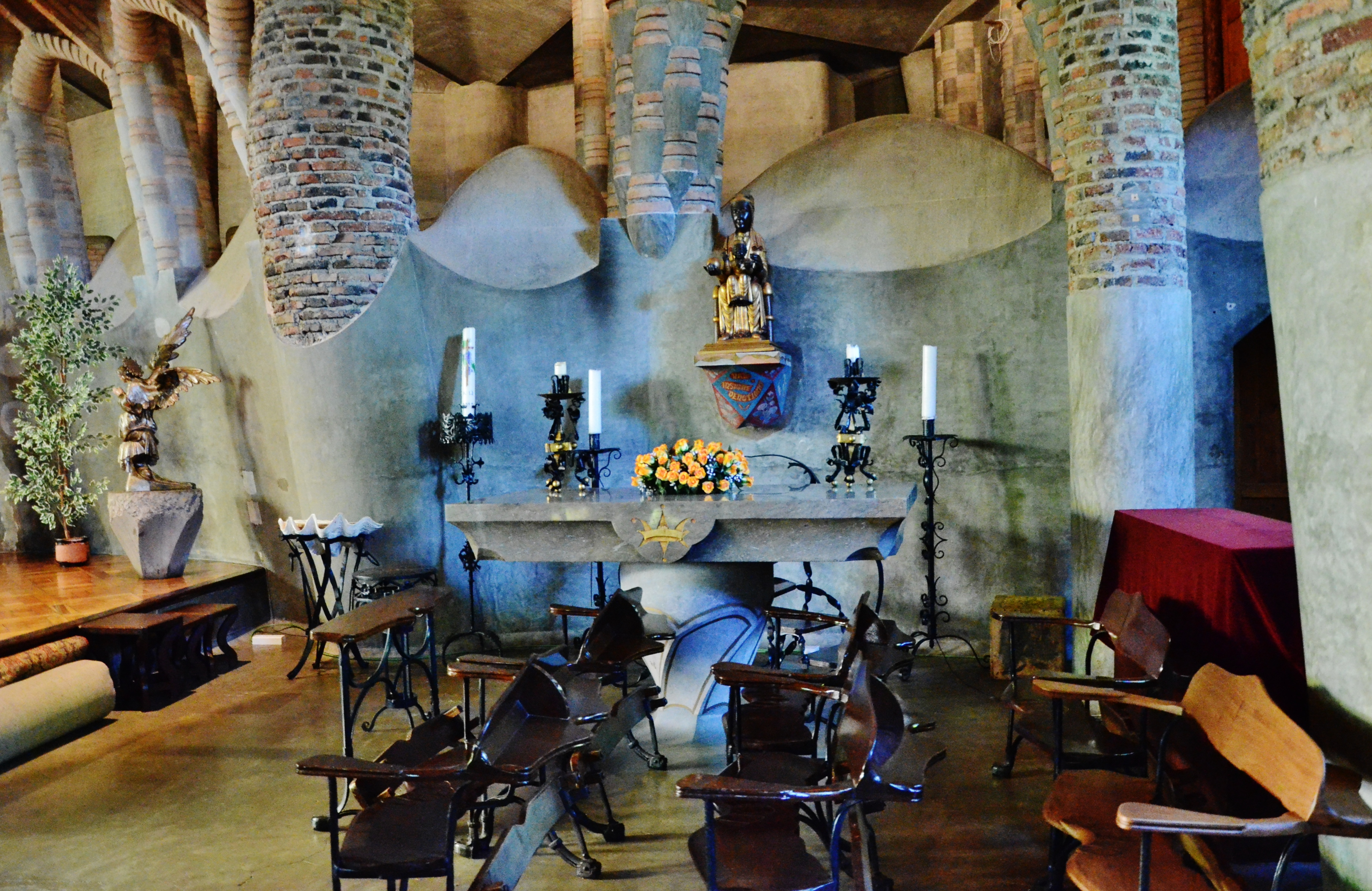
Altar dedicated to the Virgin of Montserrat

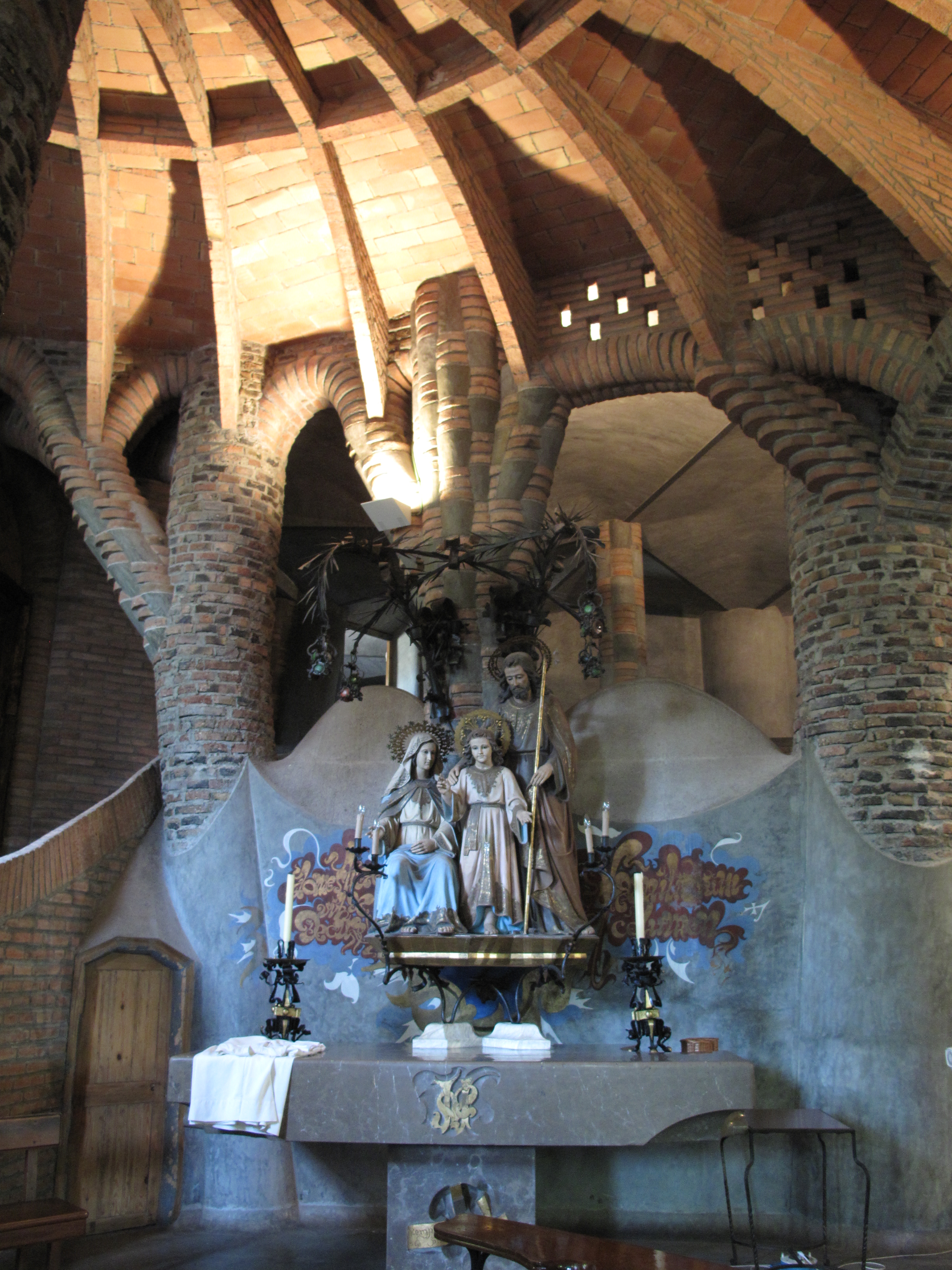
Altar dedicated to the Holy Family

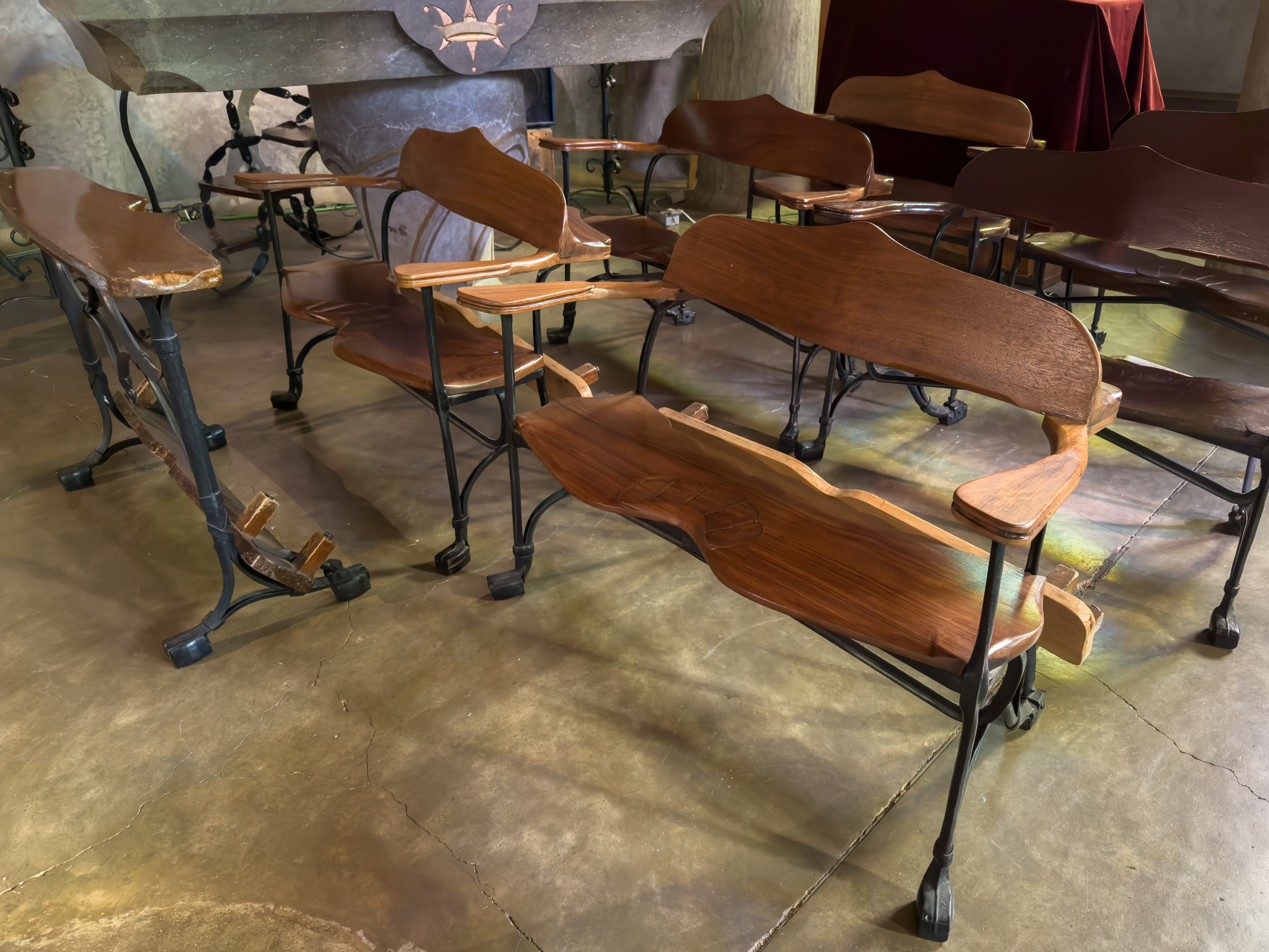
Benches with kneeler designed by Gaudí

== See also ==
- List of Gaudí buildings
