= El Papiol =

- Municipality
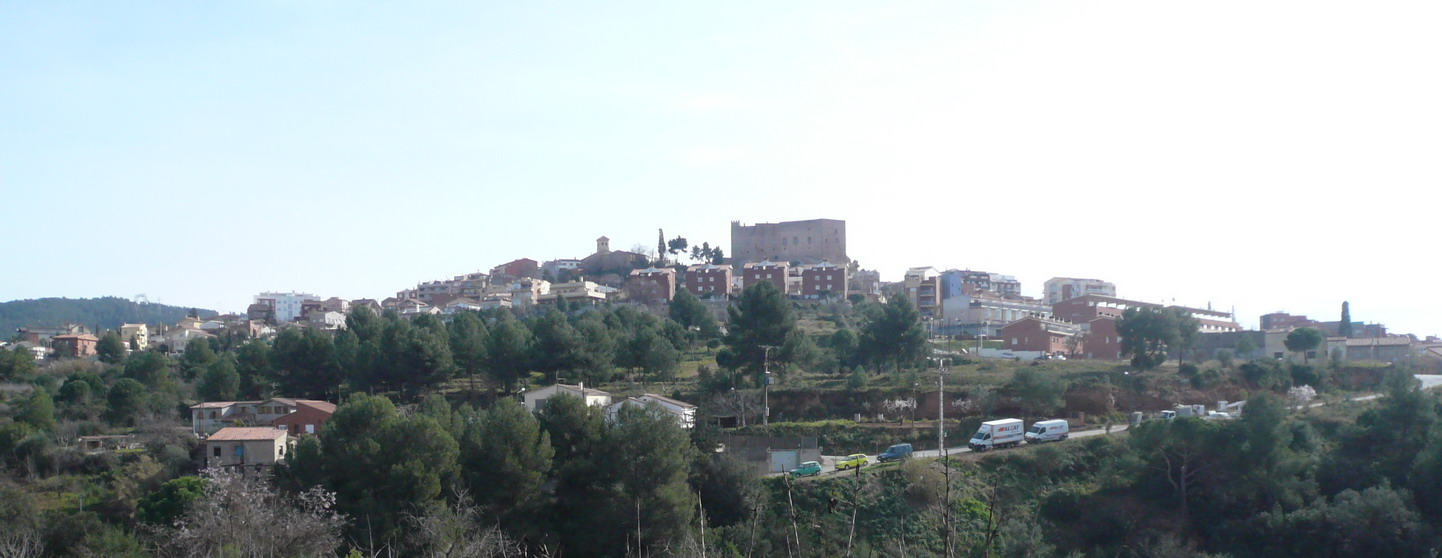

- Flag Coat of arms

- Location in Catalonia El Papiol (Spain)
- Coordinates: 41°26′21″N 2°0′38″E
- Country: Spain
- Community: Catalonia
- Province: Barcelona
- Comarca: Baix Llobregat

Government
  - Mayor: Joan Borràs Alborch (2015)

Area
  - Total: 9.0 km^{2} (3.5 sq mi)
- Elevation: 135 m (443 ft)

Population (2025-01-01)
  - Total: 4,404
  - Density: 490/km^{2} (1,300/sq mi)
- Website: elpapiol.cat

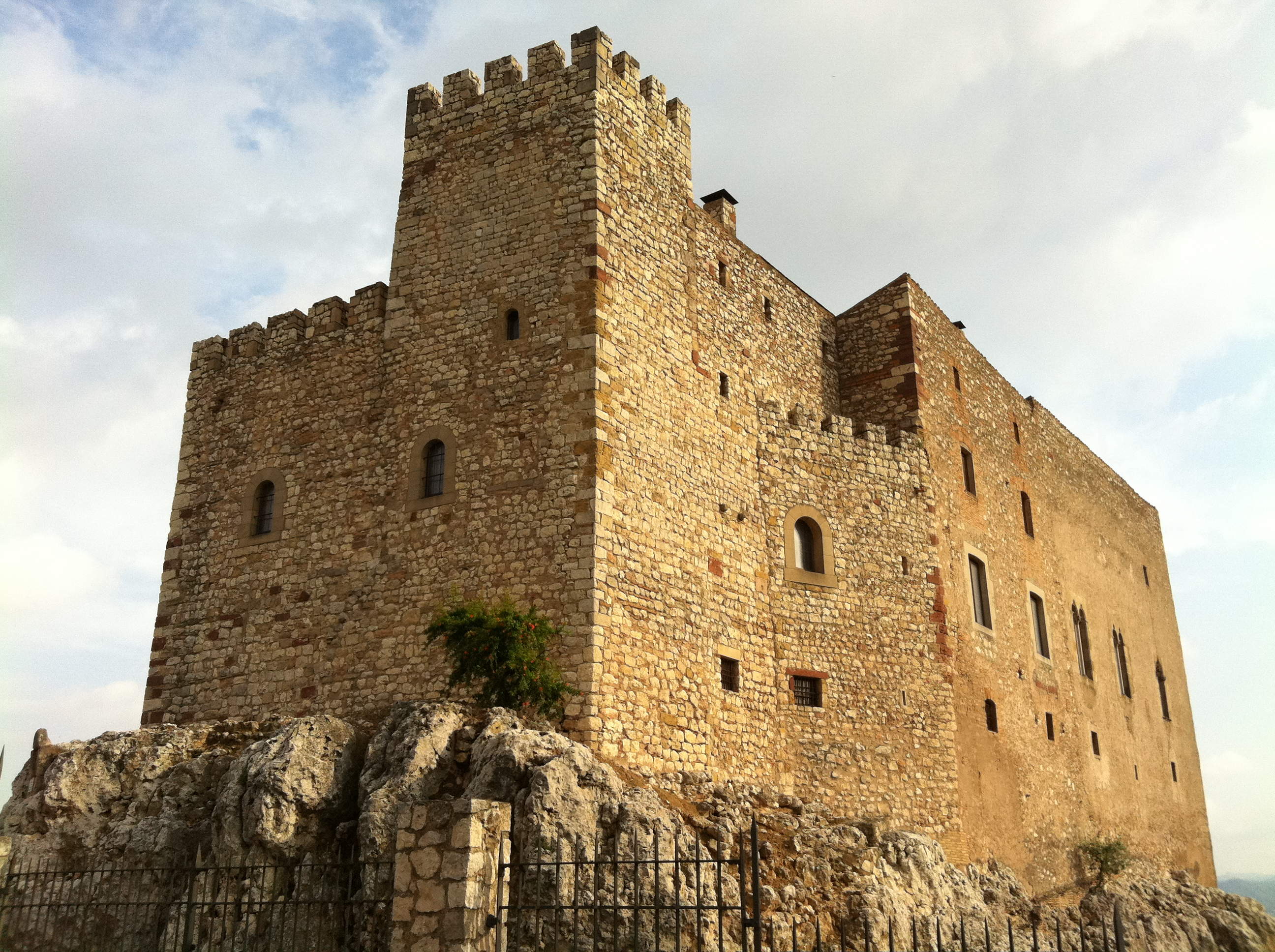
The Castle of El Papiol

El Papiol (Catalan pronunciation: [əl pəpiˈɔl]) is a municipality in the comarca of the Baix Llobregat in Catalonia, Spain. It is situated on the left bank of the Llobregat river, on the A-7 autopista from Valencia to La Jonquera and the C-1413 road from Sabadell to Molins de Rei. At West it borders on Castellbisbal and Pallejà, at North on Valldoreix (Sant Cugat del Vallès) and at East on Molins de Rei. It is served by the Renfe railway line R4 from Barcelona to Martorell, Vilafranca del Penedès and Sant Vicenç de Calders, which is connected to the village center by a minibus service (6.30 am to 10.31 pm). It is also served by a bus service (L67) and a night bus service (N51) from Barcelona to Esparreguera.

== Demography ==
1900	1930	1950	1970	1986	2018
912	1027	1159	2620	3080	4103
