= Vallirana =

- Municipality
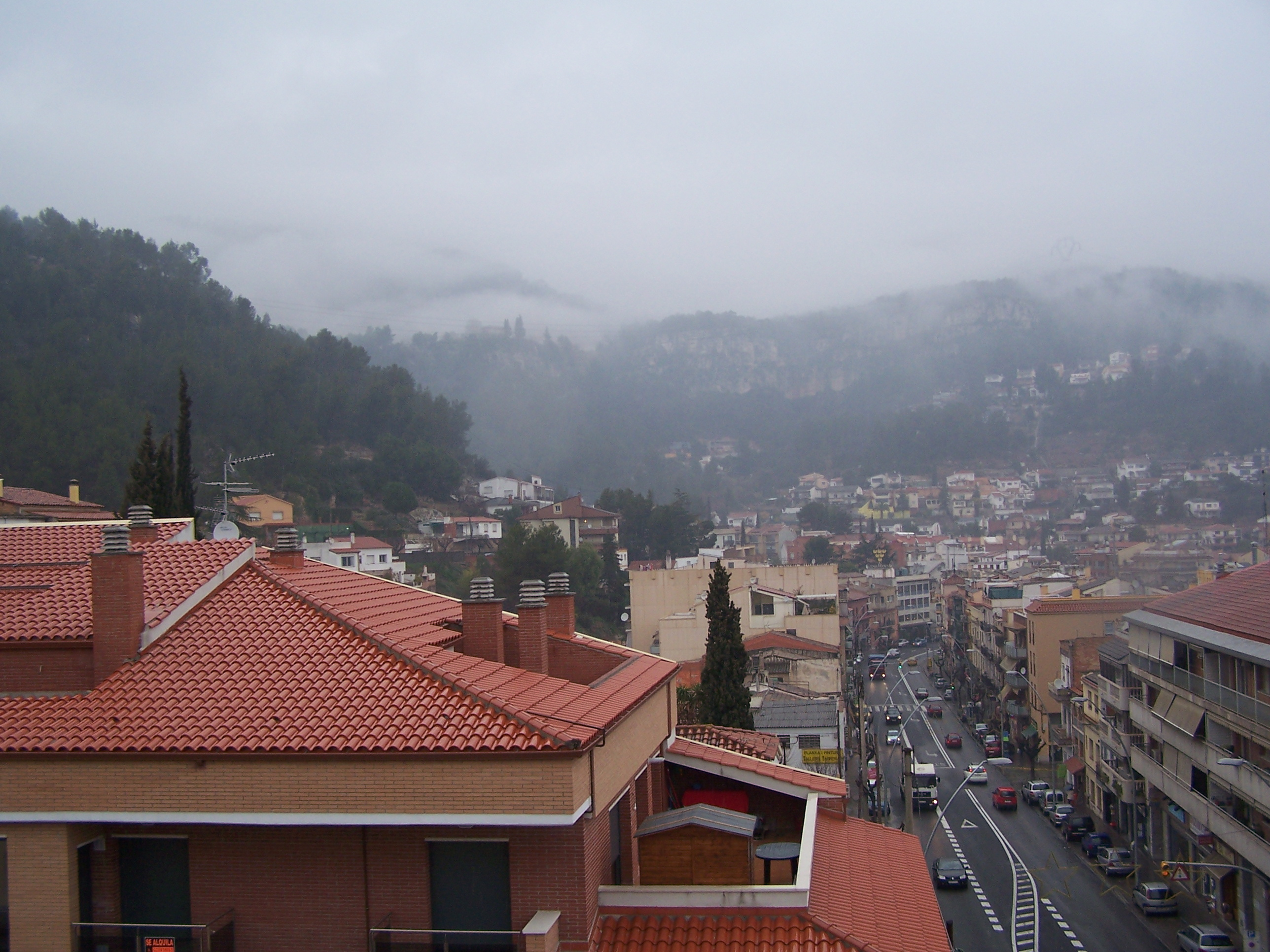
- Main street, Vallirana

- Coat of arms

- Location in Catalonia Vallirana (Spain)
- Coordinates: 41°23′16″N 1°55′56″E
- Country: Spain
- Community: Catalonia
- Province: Barcelona
- Comarca: Baix Llobregat

Government
  - mayor: Eva Maria Martínez Morales (2015)

Area
  - Total: 23.9 km^{2} (9.2 sq mi)
- Elevation: 177 m (581 ft)

Population (2025-01-01)
  - Total: 16,245
  - Density: 680/km^{2} (1,760/sq mi)
- Demonym(s): Valliranenc, valliranenca
- Website: vallirana.cat

Vallirana (Catalan pronunciation: [bəʎiˈɾanə]) is a municipality in the comarca of Baix Llobregat, Barcelona Province, Catalonia, Spain. It is located at the feet of Serra d'Ordal, not far from Barcelona city, close to the Llobregat river.
