= Sant Andreu de la Barca =

- Municipality
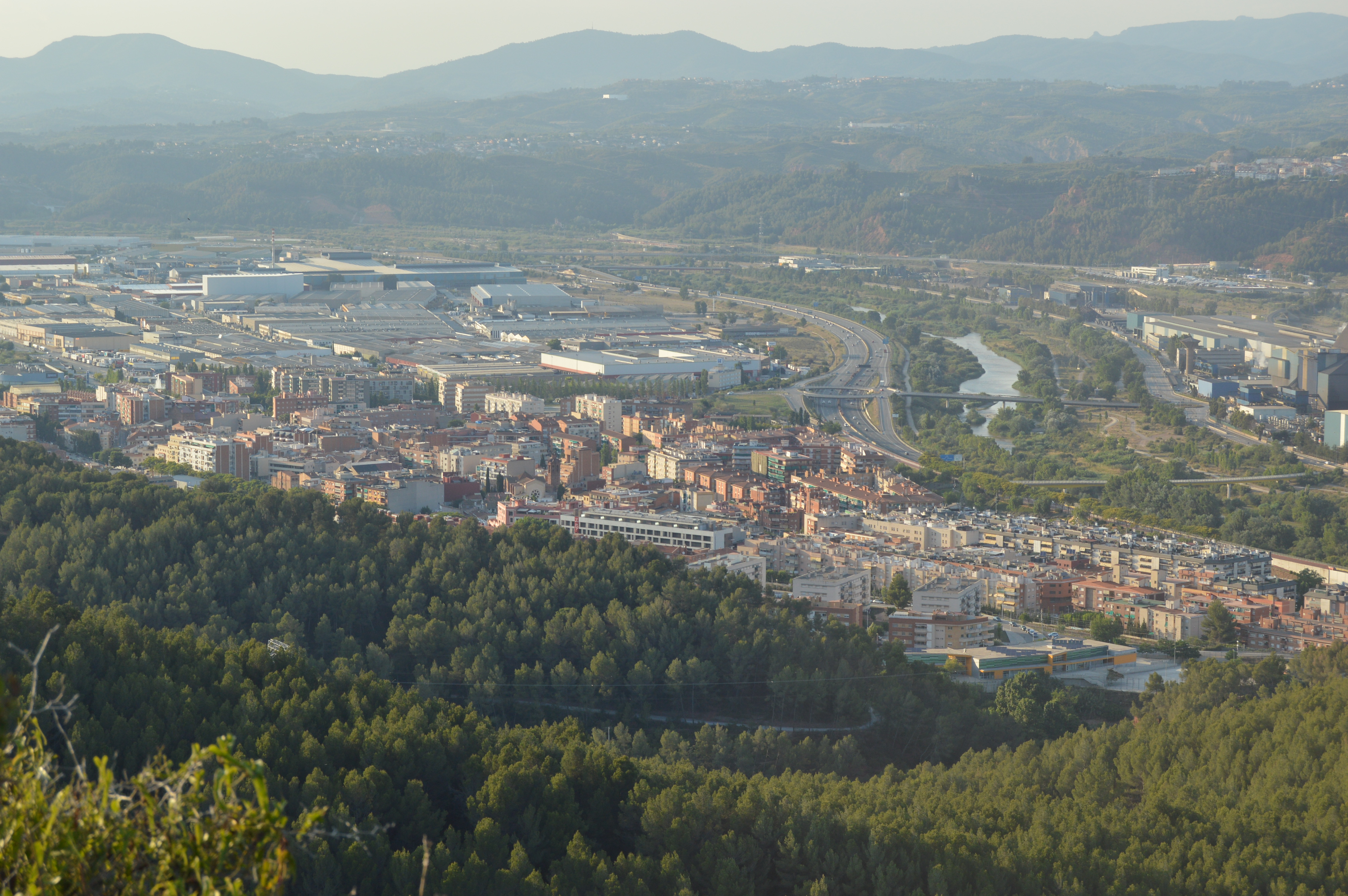
- Sant Andreu de la Barca

- Flag Coat of arms

- Location in Catalonia Sant Andreu de la Barca (Spain)
- Coordinates: 41°26′52″N 1°58′37″E
- Country: Spain
- Community: Catalonia
- Province: Barcelona
- Comarca: Baix Llobregat

Government
  - Mayor: M. Enric Llorca Ibáñez (2015)

Area
  - Total: 5.5 km^{2} (2.1 sq mi)
- Elevation: 42 m (138 ft)

Population (2025-01-01)
  - Total: 27,094
  - Density: 4,900/km^{2} (13,000/sq mi)
- Website: sabarca.cat

Sant Andreu de la Barca (Catalan pronunciation: [ˌsant ənˈdɾew ðə lə ˈβaɾkə]) is a municipality in the comarca of the Baix Llobregat in Catalonia, Spain. It is situated on the right bank of the Llobregat river, on the main N-II road The main rail lines of the Llobregat corridor pass through the town, and all the FGC suburban services stop at the station.

== Demography ==
1900	1930	1950	1970	1986	2002
814	1008	886	4870	14,298	23,307
