= Sant Climent de Llobregat =

- Municipality
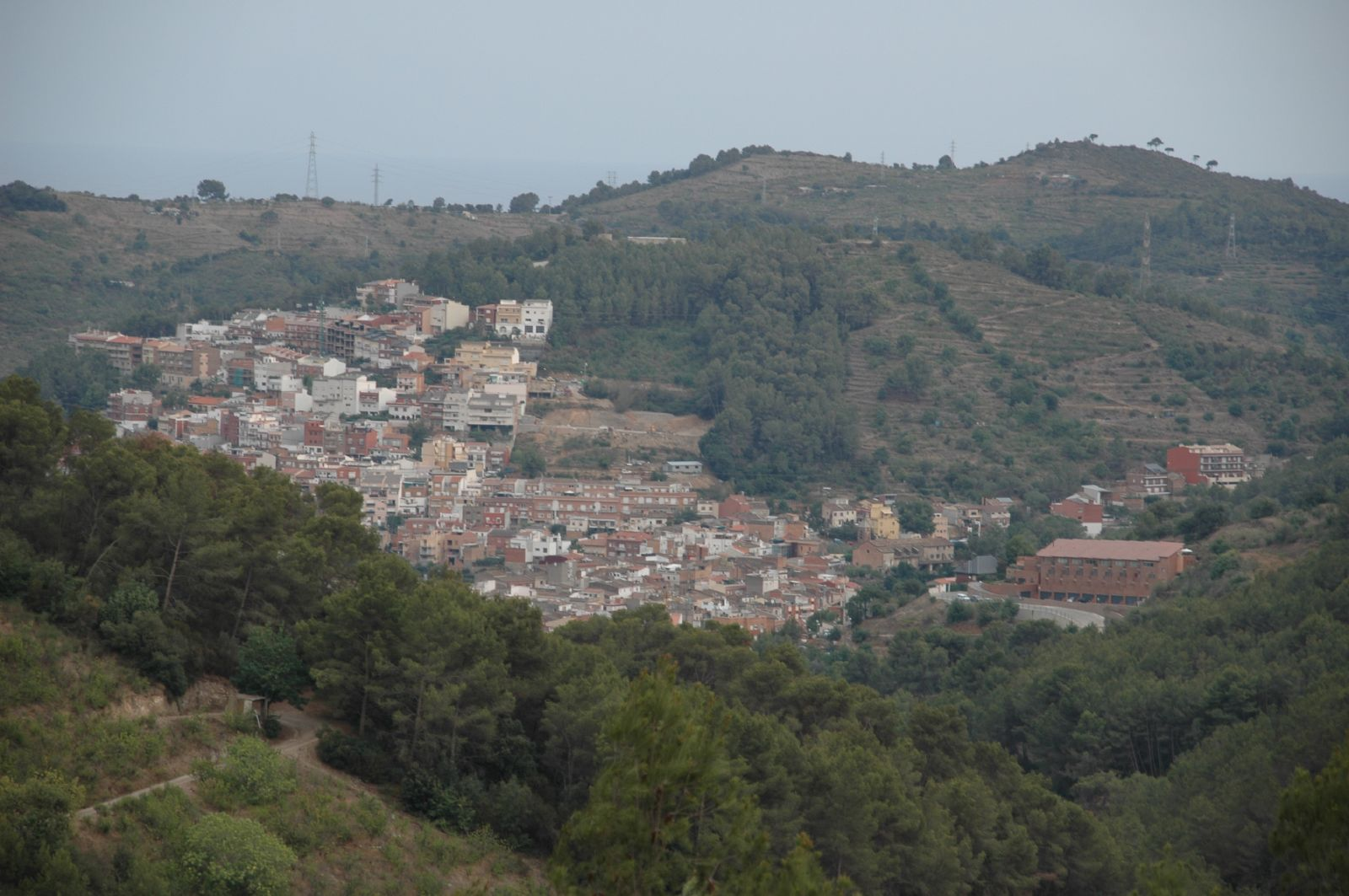
- Sant Climent de Llobregat

- Flag Coat of arms

- Location in Catalonia Sant Climent de Llobregat (Spain)
- Coordinates: 41°20′17″N 1°59′54″E
- Country: Spain
- Community: Catalonia
- Province: Barcelona
- Comarca: Baix Llobregat

Government
  - mayor: Isidre Sierra Fusté (2015)

Area
  - Total: 10.8 km^{2} (4.2 sq mi)
- Elevation: 87 m (285 ft)

Population (2025-01-01)
  - Total: 4,187
  - Density: 388/km^{2} (1,000/sq mi)
- Demonym(s): Climentó, climentona
- Postal code: 08849
- Website: santclimentdellobregat.cat

Sant Climent de Llobregat (Catalan pronunciation: [ˈsaŋ kliˈmen də ʎuβɾəˈɣat]) is a municipality in the comarca of Baix Llobregat, Barcelona Province, Catalonia, Spain. It is connected by road with Viladecans and Sant Boi de Llobregat.
