= Olesa de Montserrat =

- Municipality
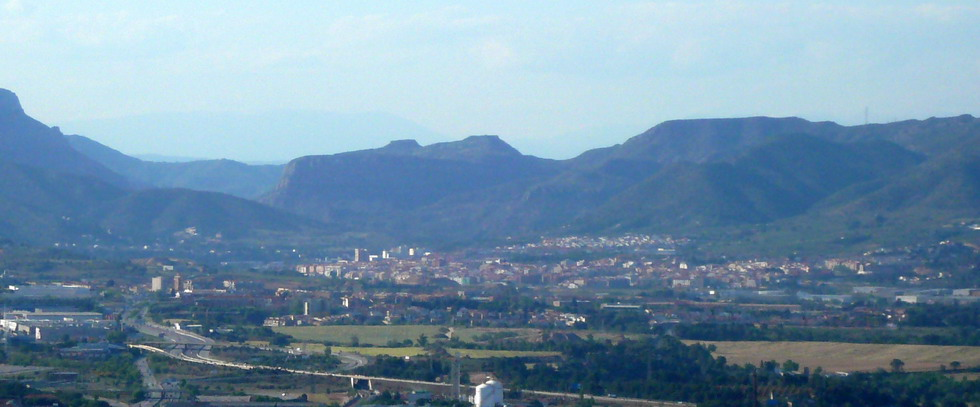
- Olesa with Sant Salvador de les Espases in background

- Flag Coat of arms

- Location in Catalonia Olesa de Montserrat (Spain)
- Coordinates: 41°32′42″N 1°53′40″E
- Country: Spain
- Community: Catalonia
- Province: Barcelona
- Comarca: Baix Llobregat

Government
  - Mayor: Maria del Pilar Puimedon Monclús (2015)

Area
  - Total: 16.6 km^{2} (6.4 sq mi)
- Elevation: 124 m (407 ft)

Population (2025-01-01)
  - Total: 24,966
  - Density: 1,500/km^{2} (3,900/sq mi)
- Postal code: 08640
- Website: www.olesamontserrat.cat

Olesa de Montserrat (Catalan pronunciation: [uˈlɛzə ðə munsəˈrat]) is a municipality in the comarca of Baix Llobregat, in Catalonia, Spain.

Olesa de Montserrat is known for olive oil and textile production as well as its Passion play (La Passió d'Olesa), which was first documented in 1538. It achieved a world record in 1996, with 726 people acting onstage at the same time.

== Main sights ==
- Torre del Relotge
- Monastery of Sant Pere Sacama
- Rural chapel of Sant Salvador de les Espases

== Twin towns ==
- Nonantola, Italy
- Weingarten, Germany

== Notable people ==
- Chanel Terrero, (Born 1991) Represented Spain in the Eurovision Song Contest 2022
