= Santa Coloma de Cervelló =

- Municipality
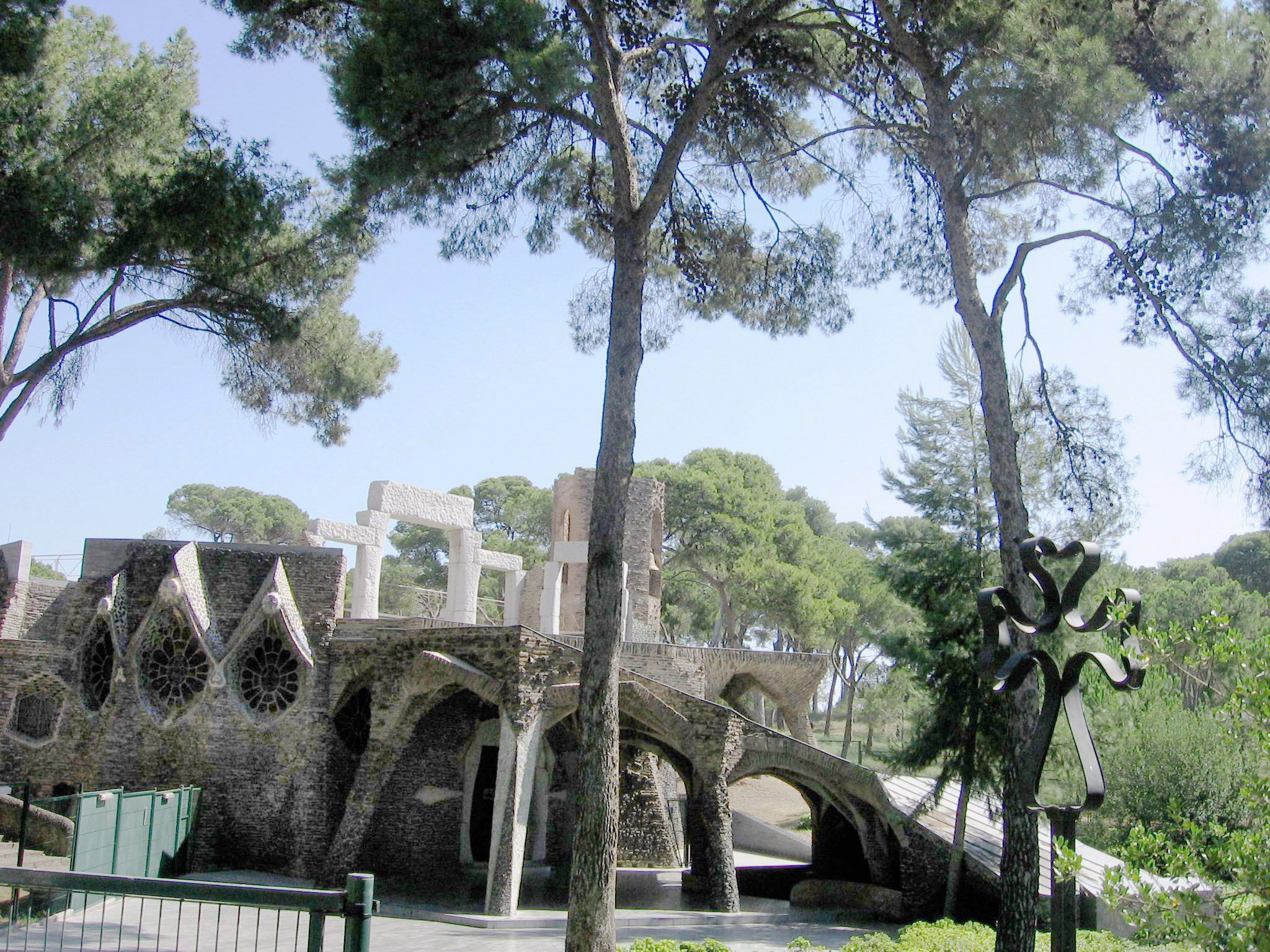
- Crypt of Colònia Güell

- Flag Coat of arms

- Location in Catalonia Santa Coloma de Cervelló (Spain)
- Coordinates: 41.363870688140686°N 2.0278704817856386°E
- Country: Spain
- Community: Catalonia
- Province: Barcelona
- Comarca: Baix Llobregat

Government
  - Mayor: Anna Martinez (PROGRÉS)

Area
  - Total: 7.5 km^{2} (2.9 sq mi)
- Elevation: 73 m (240 ft)

Population (2025-01-01)
  - Total: 8,273
  - Density: 1,100/km^{2} (2,900/sq mi)
- Website: www.santacolomadecervello.cat

Santa Coloma de Cervelló (Catalan pronunciation: [ˈsantə kuˈlomə ðə səɾβəˈʎo]) is a municipality situated in the comarca of Baix Llobregat, at the province of Barcelona, Catalonia, Spain. As of 2025, the town has a population of 8,273.

There are three urbanized zones in this town; the town centre, Colònia Güell area (which is around a former industrial colony) and residential districts. The Church of Colònia Güell, from the renowned architect Antoni Gaudí, is located here.

== See also ==
- Local government in Spain
