= La Palma de Cervelló =

- Municipality
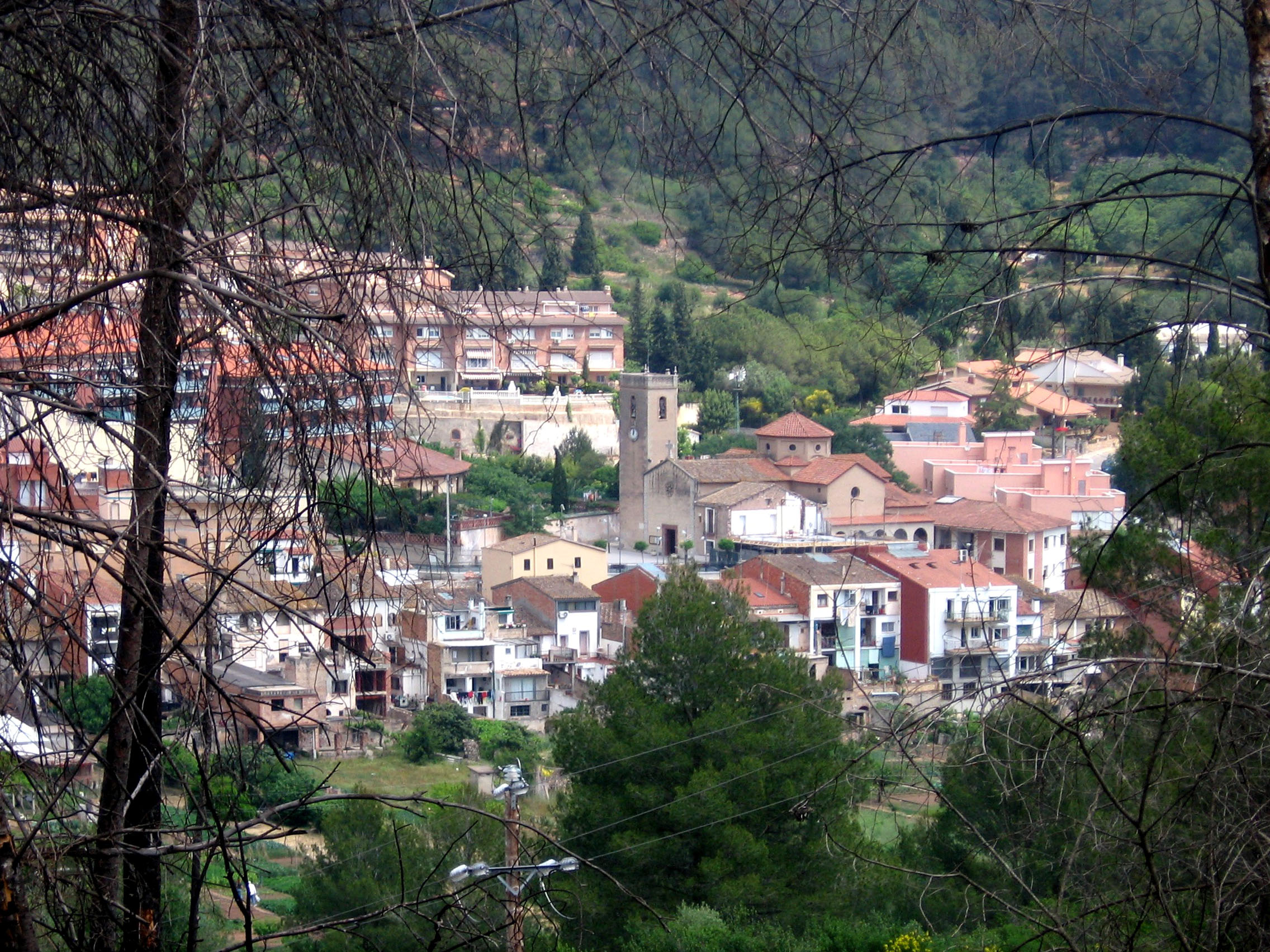

- Flag Coat of arms

- Location in Catalonia La Palma de Cervelló (Spain)
- Coordinates: 41°24′53″N 1°58′7″E
- Country: Spain
- Community: Catalonia
- Province: Barcelona
- Comarca: Baix Llobregat

Government
  - mayor: Xavier Gonzalez Alemany (2015)

Area
  - Total: 5.5 km^{2} (2.1 sq mi)
- Elevation: 100 m (330 ft)

Population (2025-01-01)
  - Total: 3,056
  - Density: 560/km^{2} (1,400/sq mi)
- Demonym(s): Palmarenc, palmarenca
- Website: www.lapalmadecervello.cat

La Palma de Cervelló (Catalan pronunciation: [lə ˈpalmə ðə səɾβəˈʎo]) is a municipality in the comarca of Baix Llobregat, Barcelona Province, Catalonia, Spain. It is located not far from Barcelona city, close to the Llobregat river.
