= Sant Vicenç dels Horts =

- Municipality
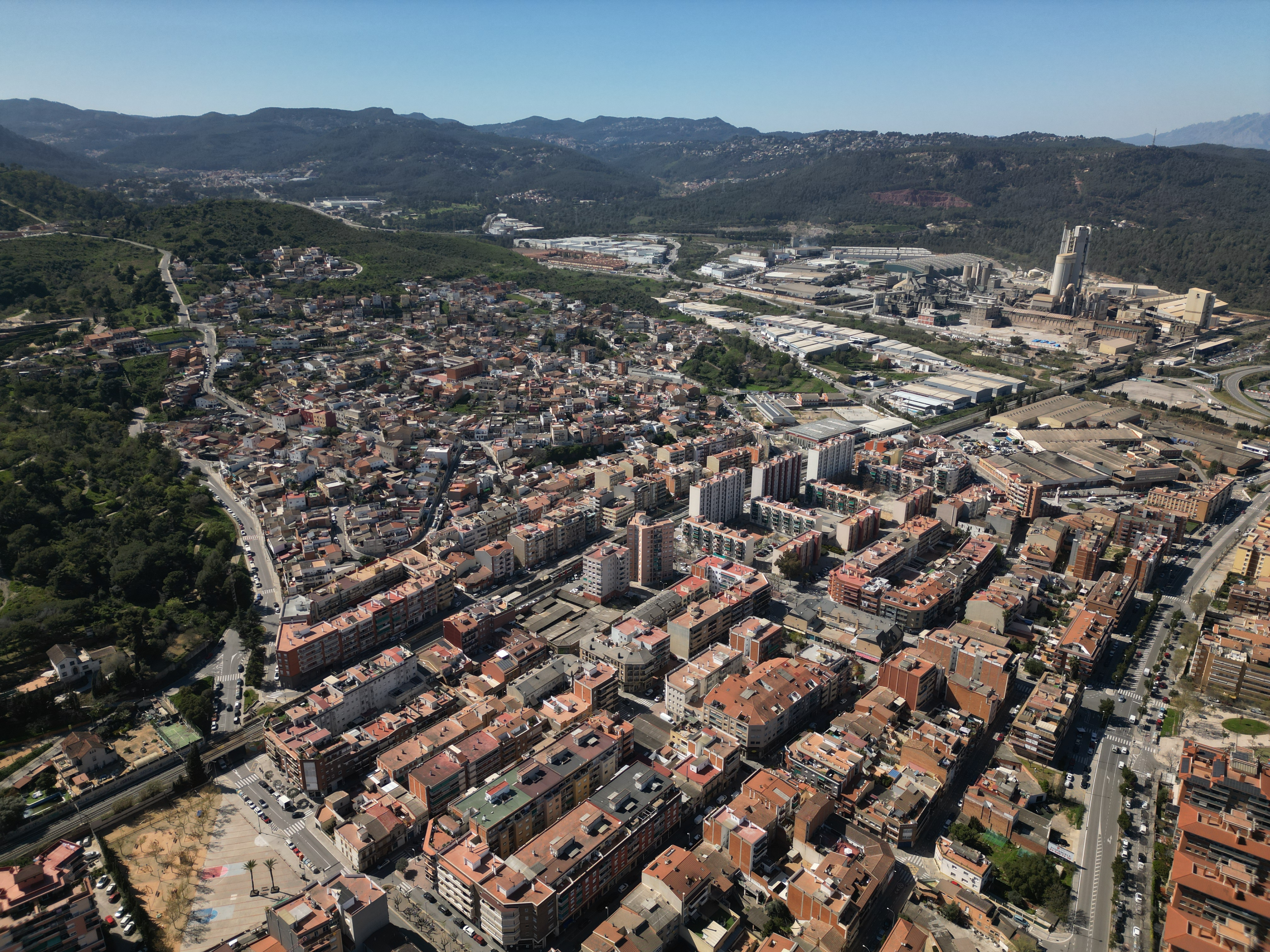
- Aerial view of Sant Vicenç dels Horts

- Flag Coat of arms

- Location within Spain Sant Vicenç dels Horts (Spain)
- Coordinates: 41°23′43″N 2°0′39″E
- Country: Spain
- Community: Catalonia
- Province: Barcelona
- Comarca: Baix Llobregat

Government
  - Mayor: Maite Aymerich i Boltà (2015) (ERC)

Area
  - Total: 9.1 km^{2} (3.5 sq mi)
- Elevation: 22 m (72 ft)

Population (2025-01-01)
  - Total: 28,746
  - Density: 3,200/km^{2} (8,200/sq mi)
- Website: www.svh.cat

Sant Vicenç dels Horts (Catalan pronunciation: [ˌsam biˈsɛnz ðəlz ˈɔrs]) is a municipality in the Province of Barcelona in Catalonia, Spain. It is situated on the right bank of the Llobregat river, on the N-340 road from Molins de Rei to Vilafranca del Penedès. The main rail lines of the Llobregat corridor pass through the town: the station is served by the FGC services S3, S4, S8, S9, R5 and R6. The remains of an Iberic village are visible at Puig Castellar.

The GR 92 long-distance footpath, which roughly follows the length of the Mediterranean coast of Spain, has a staging point at Sant Vicenç dels Horts. Stage 19 links northwards to Baixador de Vallvidrera station, a distance of 13.6 kilometres (8.5 mi), whilst stage 20 links southwards to Bruguers, a distance of 16.2 kilometres (10.1 mi).

== Demography ==
1900	1930	1950	1970	1986	2002
1809	1919	3295	14,509	20,397	26,008
