= Corbera de Llobregat =

- Municipality
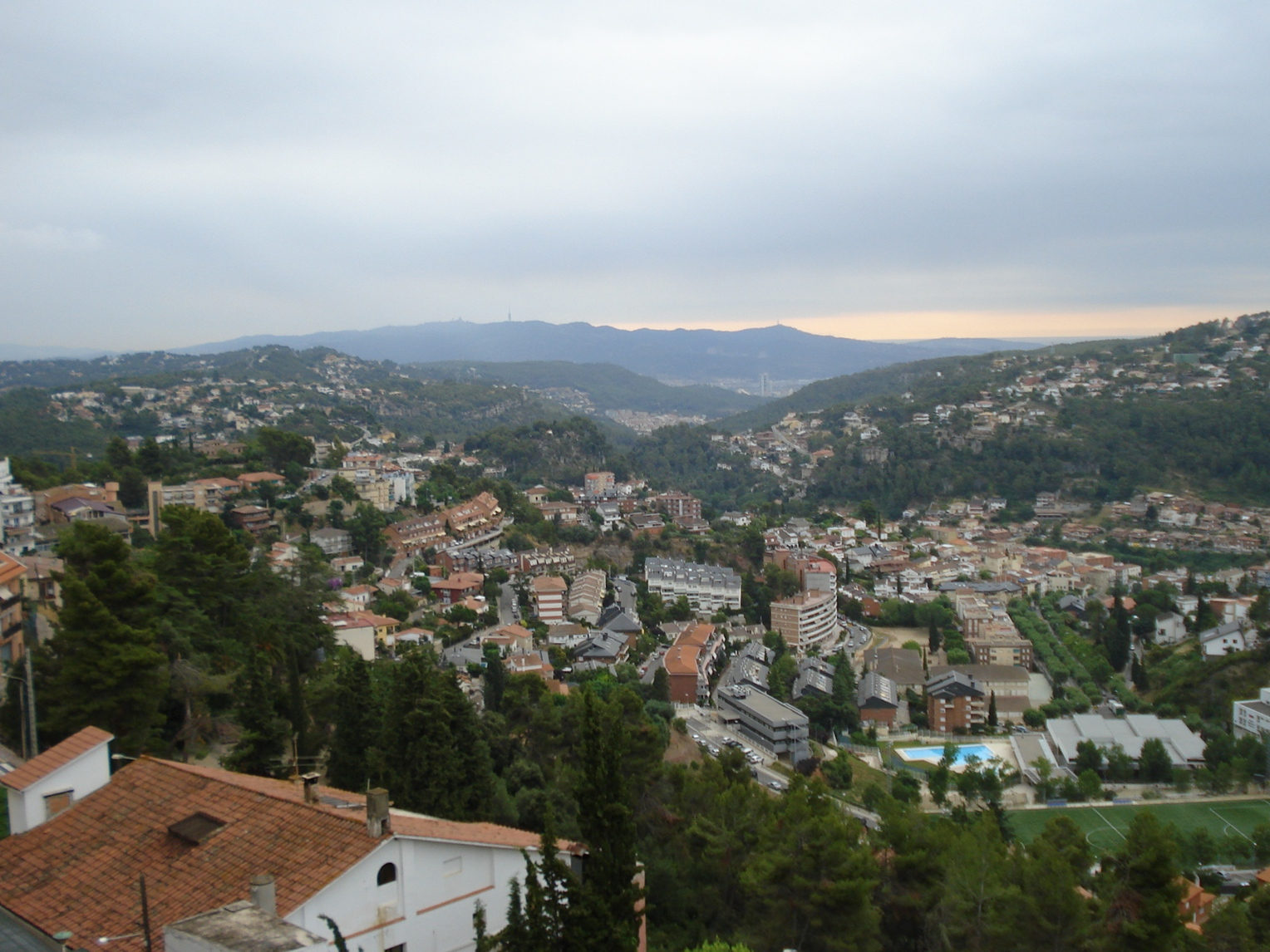
- View over Corbera de Llobregat, Barcelona from the Can Fisa hotel

- Flag Coat of arms

- Location in Catalonia Corbera de Llobregat (Spain)
- Coordinates: 41°25′1″N 1°55′53″E
- Country: Spain
- Community: Catalonia
- Province: Barcelona
- Comarca: Baix Llobregat

Government
  - Mayor: Montserrat Febrero Piera (2015)

Area
  - Total: 18.4 km^{2} (7.1 sq mi)
- Elevation: 342 m (1,122 ft)

Population (2025-01-01)
  - Total: 16,010
  - Density: 870/km^{2} (2,250/sq mi)
- Website: corberadellobregat.cat

Corbera de Llobregat (Catalan pronunciation: [kuɾˈβeɾə ðə ʎuβɾəˈɣat]) is a municipality situated in the comarca of Baix Llobregat in the province of Barcelona, Catalonia, Spain.
