= Cervelló =

- Municipality
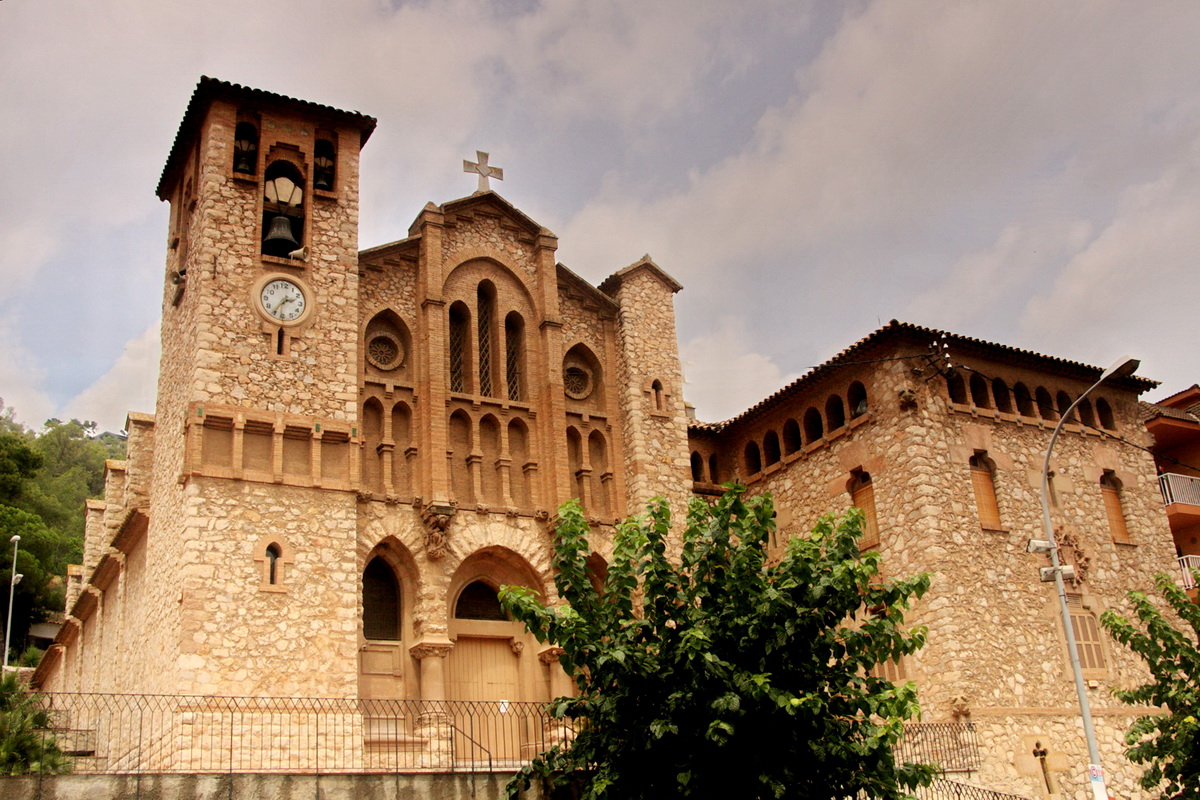
- St. Stephen's church

- Flag Coat of arms

- Location in Catalonia Cervelló (Spain)
- Coordinates: 41°23′52″N 1°57′28″E
- Country: Spain
- Community: Catalonia
- Province: Barcelona
- Comarca: Baix Llobregat

Area
  - Total: 24.1 km^{2} (9.3 sq mi)
- Elevation: 122 m (400 ft)

Population (2025-01-01)
  - Total: 9,743
  - Density: 404/km^{2} (1,050/sq mi)
- Website: www.cervello.cat

Cervelló (Catalan pronunciation: [səɾβəˈʎo]) is a municipality of the Baix Llobregat in Catalonia, Spain. It is located at the foot of Serra d'Ordal.
