= Pallejà =

- Municipality
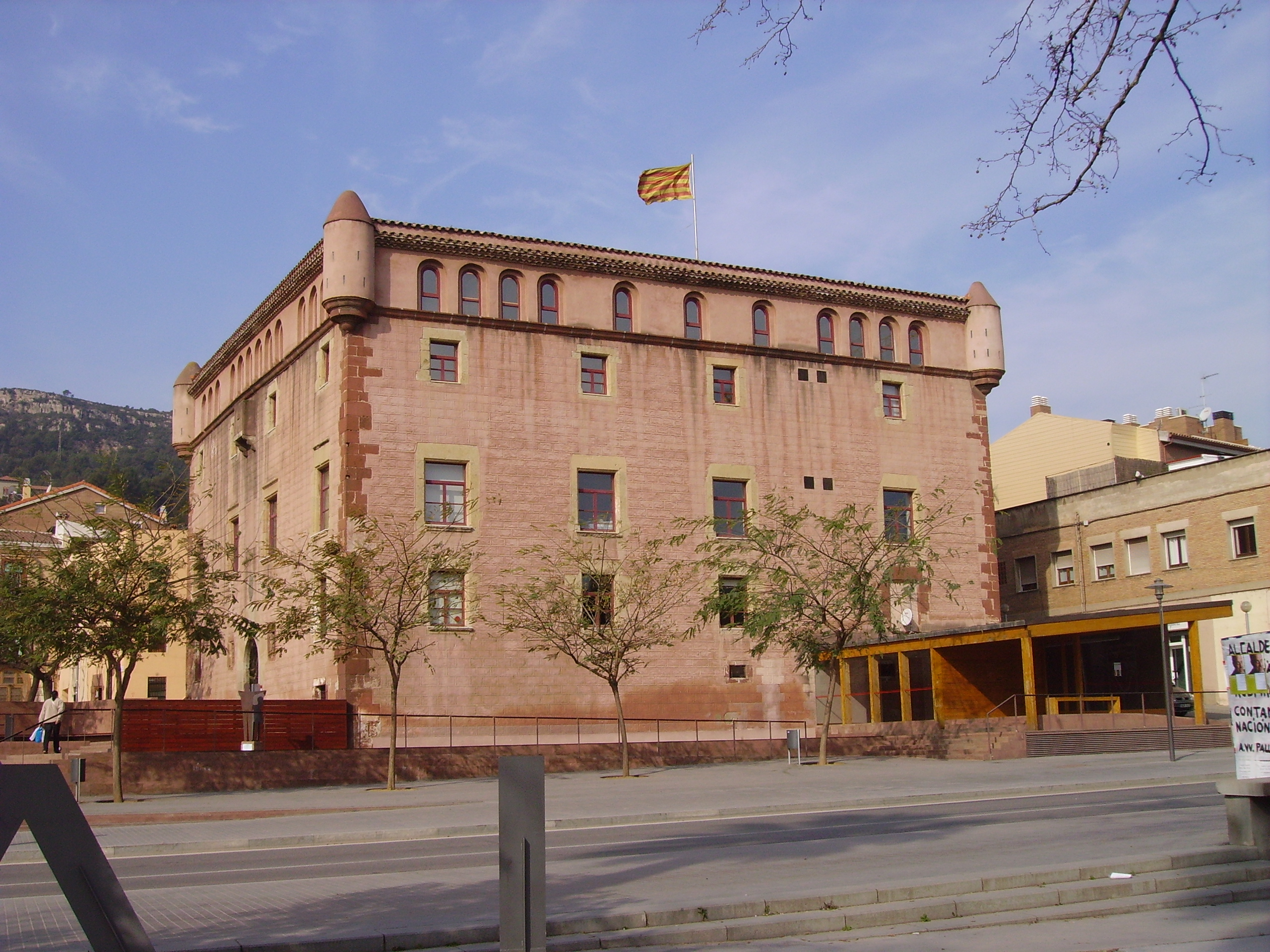
- Castell de Pallejà

- Coat of arms

- Location in Catalonia Pallejà (Spain)
- Coordinates: 41°25′27″N 1°59′52″E
- Country: Spain
- Community: Catalonia
- Province: Barcelona
- Comarca: Baix Llobregat

Government
  - Mayor: Ascensión Ratia Checa (2015)

Area
  - Total: 8.3 km^{2} (3.2 sq mi)
- Elevation: 41 m (135 ft)

Population (2025-01-01)
  - Total: 12,006
  - Density: 1,400/km^{2} (3,700/sq mi)
- Website: palleja.cat

Pallejà (Catalan pronunciation: [pəʎəˈʒa]) is a municipality in the comarca of the Baix Llobregat in Catalonia, Spain. It is situated on the right bank of the Llobregat river, on the main N-II road. The main rail lines of the Llobregat corridor pass through the town: the station is served by the FGC services R5/R50, R6, S4 and S8. Pallejà castle was built in the seventeenth century on the site of an older fortress; it currently houses a library.

== Demography ==
1900	1930	1950	1970	1986	2005
656	1022	1065	4081	5919	10339
