= Baix Llobregat =

Coordinates: 41°25′50″N 1°58′00″E

- Comarca
- Country: Spain
- Autonomous community: Catalonia
- Province: Barcelona
- Region: Àmbit metropolità de Barcelona
- Capital: Sant Feliu de Llobregat
- Municipalities: List: Abrera, Begues, Castelldefels, Castellví de Rosanes, Cervelló, Collbató, Corbera de Llobregat, Cornellà de Llobregat, Esparreguera, Esplugues de Llobregat, Gavà, Martorell, Molins de Rei, Olesa de Montserrat, Pallejà, La Palma de Cervelló, El Papiol, El Prat de Llobregat, Sant Andreu de la Barca, Sant Boi de Llobregat, Sant Climent de Llobregat, Sant Esteve Sesrovires, Sant Feliu de Llobregat, Sant Joan Despí, Sant Just Desvern, Sant Vicenç dels Horts, Santa Coloma de Cervelló, Torrelles de Llobregat, Vallirana, Viladecans

Government
  - Body: Baix Llobregat Comarcal Council
  - President: Eva Martínez Morales (PSC)

Area
  - Total: 486.2 km^{2} (187.7 sq mi)

Population (2014)
  - Total: 806,249
  - Density: 1,658/km^{2} (4,295/sq mi)
- Demonym
- Time zone: UTC+1 (CET)
  - Summer (DST): UTC+2 (CEST)
- Largest municipality: Cornellà de Llobregat

Baix Llobregat (Catalan pronunciation: [ˈbaʒ ʎuβɾəˈɣat]) is a comarca (county) on the coast of Catalonia, Spain. It is located in the Barcelona region and its capital is Sant Feliu de Llobregat.

== Municipalities ==
Municipality	Population (2014)	Area km^{2}
Abrera	12,125	19.9
Begues	6,620	50.4
Castelldefels	63,255	12.9
Castellví de Rosanes	1,760	16.4
Cervelló	8,811	24.1
Collbató	4,427	18.1
Corbera de Llobregat	14,237	18.4
Cornellà de Llobregat	86,234	7.0
Esparreguera	21,685	27.4
Esplugues de Llobregat	46,133	4.6
Gavà	46,326	30.8
Martorell	27,895	12.8
Molins de Rei	25,152	15.9
Olesa de Montserrat	23,543	16.6
Pallejà	11,253	8.3
La Palma de Cervelló	3,002	5.5
El Papiol	4,023	9.0
El Prat de Llobregat	62,866	31.4
Sant Andreu de la Barca	27,268	5.5
Sant Boi de Llobregat	83,107	21.5
Sant Climent de Llobregat	3,938	10.8
Sant Esteve Sesrovires	7,542	18.6
Sant Feliu de Llobregat	43,715	11.8
Sant Joan Despí	32,981	6.2
Sant Just Desvern	16,389	7.8
Sant Vicenç dels Horts	28,103	9.1
Santa Coloma de Cervelló	8,038	7.5
Torrelles de Llobregat	5,851	13.6
Vallirana	14,612	23.9
Viladecans	65,358	20.4
Total municipalities–30	806,249	486.2

== Proposed changes ==
It has long been proposed to split the northern part of Baix Llobregat into a separate comarca. The Catalan government's "Report on the revision of Catalonia's territorial organisation model" (the Roca Report), published in 2000, recommends many changes to comarcas, including the creation of Baix Llobregat Nord, with its capital at Martorell, taking in several more municipalities from Alt Penedès, Anoia, Bages, and Vallès Occidental. Recent campaigns have referred to the proposed new comarca as "Montserratí", due to the landmark Montserrat mountain marking part of its eastern border.
