= FGC 213 Series =

Commuter-train class

213 series
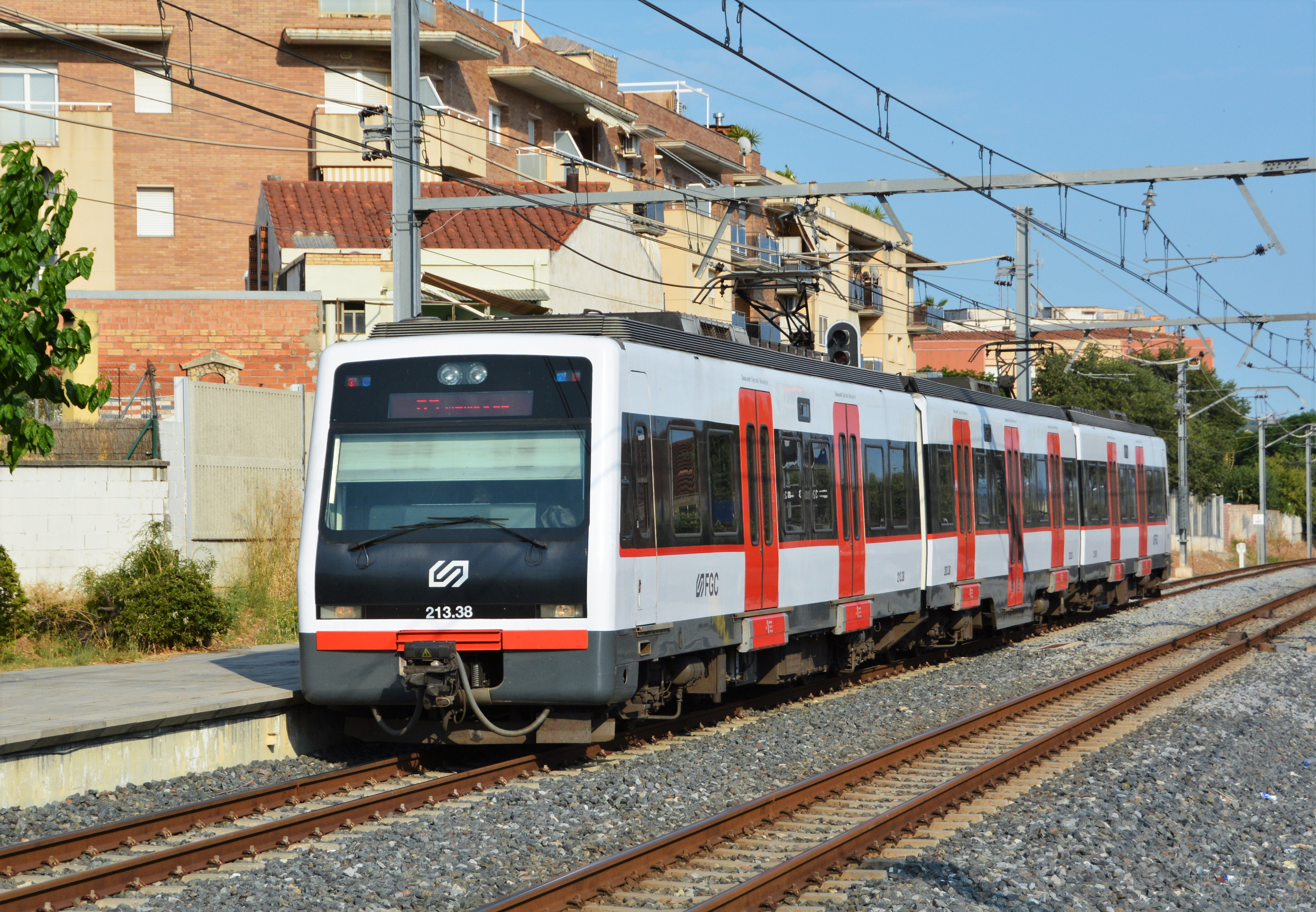
- 213.38 in Olesa de Montserrat
- Manufacturers: CAF, Alstom and Bombardier
- Replaced: FGC 211 Series
- Constructed: 1998–2008
- Entered service: 1 February 1999
- Number built: 126 vehicles (42 sets)
- Formation: 3-car sets (Mcp–T–Mcp)
- Operator: Ferrocarrils de la Generalitat de Catalunya
- Depot: Martorell-Enllaç
- Line served: Llobregat-Anoia line

Specifications
- Train length: 51.98 m (170 ft 6 in)
- Car length: 16,323 mm (53 ft 6.6 in) (Mcp); 16,196 mm (53 ft 1.6 in) (T)
- Width: 2.75 m (9 ft 0 in)
- Height: 3.97 m (13 ft 0 in)
- Doors: 2 doors per side on Mcp cars; 3 doors per side on T car
- Maximum speed: 90 km/h (55 mph)
- Weight: 101.9 t (100.3 long tons; 112.3 short tons) (full 3-car set; tare)
- Traction system: GTO–VVVF
- Traction motors: 8 × ABB 4 EBA 3542 180 kW (240 hp) asynchronous 3-phase AC
- Power output: 1,440 kW (1,930 hp)
- Acceleration: 1.05 m/s^{2} (3.4 ft/s^{2})
- Deceleration: 0.7 m/s^{2} (2.3 ft/s^{2})
- Electric systems: 1,500 V DC (nominal) from overhead catenary
- Current collection: Pantograph
- UIC classification: Bo′Bo′+2′2′+Bo′Bo′
- Safety system: FAP
- Track gauge: 1,000 mm (3 ft 3 3/8 in)

The 213 series is a DC electric multiple unit (EMU) commuter and suburban train type operated by Ferrocarrils de la Generalitat de Catalunya, providing all passenger service on the Llobregat-Anoia line since 2009. First introduced in 1999, the trains operate as single units or coupled as 6 car double units.

== Background ==
At the time of introduction in 1999, the 213 series initially replaced the more obsolete units that were still operating in the Llobregat-Anoia line (3000, 5000 and 8000 series). The new units provided passenger service next to the older 211 series.

The trains were acquired in the context of modernization of the Llobregat-Anoia line and electrification of the Igualada branch. The first order of trains consisted of 20 units. The units were built by Alstom, CAF and Bombardier. They share many design elements with their standard-gauge counterpart in the Barcelona-Vallès line, the 112 series.

== Design ==
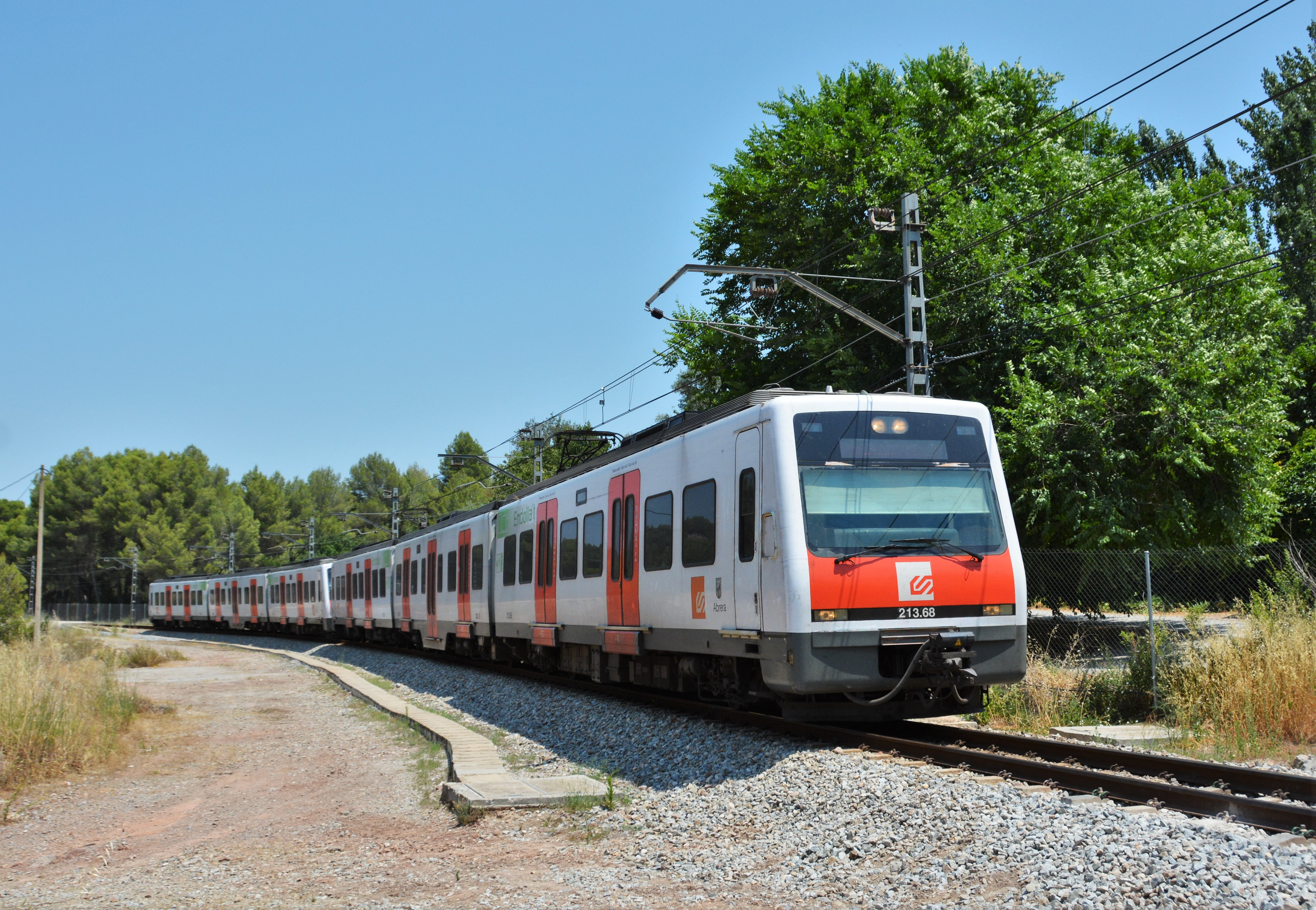
A couple of 213 units in their original livery

The EMUs are 3 car units with 2 motor cars (one on each end) and a trailer car (the middle car). There are 2 doors per side on motor cars and 3 doors per side in the middle car. The central door on the middle car is lower than the rest, to provide at-grade PRM access. The rest of the doors include a folding step to allow access on the low platforms of the Llobregat-Anoia line. Every 213 unit includes a WC in car 2, next to the driver cab.

== Operations ==
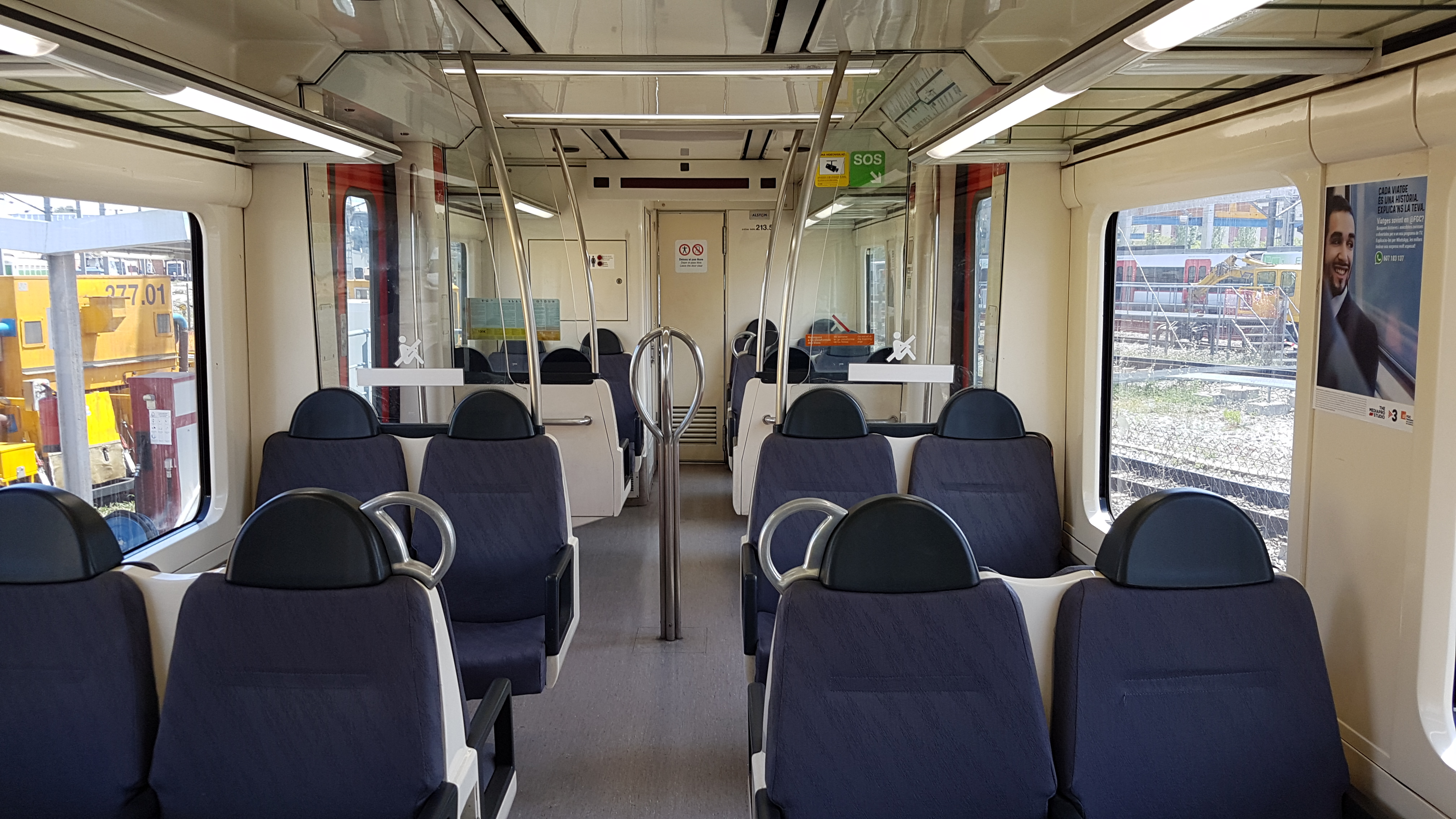
Interior

While most service is provided by single units, 213 units are commonly coupled to cope with demand in peak times. In 2015, the whole 42 units underwent a renovation project, which included upgrades of the interior lighting, seating, the WC and an update to the exterior livery. The front livery was changed from orange to black.

== Fleet details ==
Currently, there are 42 units in service, providing all passenger service in the Llobregat-Anoia line.

=== Named units ===
At the time of their introduction, units 213.01 to 213.20 were named after municipalities served by the line. The municipality's name and coat of arms can be observed on the side of the motor cars.

| Unit | Name | Unit | Name | Unit | Name | Unit | Name |
|---|---|---|---|---|---|---|---|
| 213.01 | Igualada | 213.06 | Castellbell i el Vilar | 213.11 | Martorell | 213.16 | Masquefa |
| 213.02 | Manresa | 213.07 | Vilanova del Camí | 213.12 | Pallejà | 213.17 | Olesa de Montserrat |
| 213.03 | Capellades | 213.08 | Sant Vicenç dels Horts | 213.13 | Sant Esteve Sesrovires | 213.18 | Abrera |
| 213.04 | Piera | 213.09 | Sant Vicenç de Castellet | 213.14 | Sant Boi de Llobregat | 213.19 | La Pobla de Claramunt |
| 213.05 | Sant Andreu de la Barca | 213.10 | Vallbona d'Anoia | 213.15 | Santa Coloma de Cervelló | 213.20 | Monistrol de Montserrat |

After the class's refurbishment in 2015, several other units were named after notable Catalan writers and artists. Their portrait is featured on the train's livery, in addition to a small biographic quote in the interior.

| Unit | Name | Date |
|---|---|---|
| 213.22 | Josep Carner | July 2020 |
| 213.23 | Joan Perucho | July 2020 |
| 213.25 | Joanot Martorell | April 2018 |
| 213.26 | Enric Prat de la Riba | September 2016 |
| 213.28 | Dolors Monserdà | April 2019 |
| 213.31 | Joan Cererols | July 2016 |
| 213.33 | Joan Brossa | April 2019 |
| 213.35 | Rosa Sensat | April 2023 |
| 213.36 | Antoni Gaudí | November 2026 |
| 213.37 | Joan Salvat-Papasseit | April 2024 |
| 213.41 | Montserrat Vayreda | April 2024 |
| 213.27 | Josep Maria Llompart | April 2025 |
| 213.39 | Francesc Candel | April 2025 |
