= Institutional support for the queries on the independence of Catalonia =

The Catalonian independence referendums of 2009–2010 have been carried out by civil society and the implications of public institutions for their organizations are persecuted by the Spanish State. But several city councils and comarcal councils have approved motions in favor of this referendum to be called a civil organization, supporting them in this way without violating the laws.

== Municipalities ==
Municipalities for the query. Municipalities against the query.

Municipalities that has approved a motion for the celebration of a query on Catalonia independence
Municipality	Pob.	For	Against	Abstention	Day
Agramunt	5.577	ERC (5), CiU (5)	-	PSC (3)	30.09.09
L'Albi	841	TFA (4), CiU (3)	-	-	
L'Aldea	3.966	IPA-FIC (2), ERC (5), CiU (2)	-	PSC (1)	17.09.09
Alella	8.998	COR (1), Gd'A (1), ERC+LG (6), CiU (2)	PP (1)	PSC (1)	24.09.09
Alfarràs	3.163				
Alfés	323	ERC (4), IPA (3)	-	-	04.11.09
Alp	1.686	ERC (1), CiU (4), Id'A (2), AC (2)	-	-	?
Alpens	312				?
Amposta	20.652	ERC, CiU		PSC	28.09.09
Arbeca	2.472	ERC, CiU	-	PM	22.09.09
L'Arboç	5.063				24.09.09
Arbúcies	6.232	EPA (5), ERC (4), CUPA (2), IA (1)	PSC (1)	-	29.09.09
Arenys de Mar	14.449	CiU, ERC, ICV	PP	PSC	
Arenys de Munt	8.023	CiU, ERC, AM2000 and CUP		PSC	
Argentona	11.402				
Artesa de Lleida	1.503	ERC and PSC			08.10.09
Balsareny	3.505				
Banyoles	17.917	CiU (8), ERC (6), ICV (1), PPB-PSC (2)	-	-	02.11.09
Bell-lloc d'Urgell	2.413	CiU, ERC, PSC (2)	-	PSC (2)	24.09.09
Berga	17.072	CiU, CUP and ERC			
Besalú	2.290	CiU	-	IpB-PM	
Blancafort	415	ERC			30.09.09
Blanes	40.168	CiU, PdB, ERC	PSC, PP	ICV-EUiA	29.09.09
Les Borges Blanques	5.942				24.09.09
Breda	3.753	CiU, TxB, CxB (1), PSC-PM	-	CxB (1)	
Cabrera de Mar	4.269				
Cabrils	6.698	VIC, ERC	PSC, PP		02.10.09
Calders	914				
Caldes de Montbui	16.518				24.09.09
Calella	18.034				
Calldetenes	2.252	ERC (6), CiU (2), Poble en Marxa (2)	-	-	28.09.09
Callús	1.610				
Camarles	3.629				
Canet de Mar	15.097				
Capellades	5.458	VdC-CUP (2), ERC (3), CiU (6), PSC (1)	-	PSC (1)	30.09.10
Cardedeu	16.102				24.09.09
Cassà de la Selva	9.256				
Castellbell i el Vilar	3.617				
Castellbisbal	11.540	ERC, CiU and AxC	PSC and TxC	-	28.09.09
Castellfollit de la Roca	993	CiU (5), ERC (2)	-	-	
Castellfollit de Riubregós	192				
Cerdanyola del Vallès	58.493				
Cervera	9.247	ERC (2), SiF (2), CiU (3)	PP (1)	PSC (2), INSE (1), PxC (2)	30.09.09
Collbató	3.780	GIC, PSC, CiU and ERC	-	-	
Corbins	1.370	CiU and PSC	-	-	
L'Espluga de Francolí	3.861	CiU, ERC and Espluga Viva			01.10.09
L'Esquirol	2.289	CiU, IC-ERC	-	-	
L'Estany	385				
La Floresta	199	CiU	-	-	
Folgueroles	2.058	CiU, ERC, PSC and Independents	-	-	
Fonollosa	1.279	CiU, ERC and PSC	-	-	
Fornells de la Selva	1.760				24.09.09
Fulleda	119				
Girona	94.484	CIU, ERC, IC	PP (1)	PSC(10)	10.11.09
Gironella	5.016				
Gurb	2.394	CiU and ERC	-	-	15.10.09
Hostalets de Pierola	2.219				
Hostalric	3.619	HC (1), ERC (3), CiU (3)	PSC (1)	CiU (1), ICV (1)	07.10.09
Ivars d'Urgell	1.747	CiU and ERC	-	-	24.09.09
Jorba	786	CiU and ERC	-	-	
Juneda	3.342				
La Jonquera	3.107				
Linyola	2.781	CiU, ERC, PSC, independents	-	-	24.09.09
Llagostera	8.065				
Llambilles	522				
Lloret de Mar	32.728				
Manlleu	20.505	CiU and ERC	PxC	PSC	20.10.09
Manresa	76.635	CiU (8), ERC (3), CUP (1)	PSC (8), PP (2)	ICV (2), PxC (1)	19.10.09
Marganell	301	CiU (4) and ERC	-	CiU (2)	
Martorell	26.169	CiU and ERC	-	PP, PSC and ICV	
Masnou	21.935	ERC, CiU, ICV	PSC, PP	PSC (1)	
Maspujols	520				
Mieres	331	CiU (5), MP (1), ApG (1)	-	-	29.09.09
Moià	5.711	MAP-ERC and CDC	PSC	UDC	24.09.09
Molins de Rei	23.544	IiE, ERC, CiU and CUP	PSC	PP (absent)	30.09.09
Monistrol de Montserrat	2.983				
Montblanc	7.069				24.09.09
Montesquiu	861				
Muntanyola	548	CiU, ERC and PSC	-	-	
Navàs	5.959	CiU, ERC, Més Navàs	PSC		24.09.09
Navès	274				
Olesa de Montserrat	22.257				
Olost	1.199				
Olvan	905				
Orpí	193	Orpí-AM	CiU	-	
Palafrugell	21.307				30.09.09
el Papiol	3.781	Junts pel Papiol-AM and CiU		PSC	06.10.09
Pardines	168				
Paüls	626	CiU	PSC	-	
Pinell de Solsonès	212	ERC	-	CiU	
Planoles	282	ERC, CiU, and IxP-AM	-	-	
La Pobla de Claramunt	2.235	ERC and CiU	-	PSC	24.09.09
Prats de Lluçanès	2.719				
Prats de Rei	540	GAP-AM and CiU	PSC	-	
Premià de Dalt	9.788				
Premià de Mar	27.545	ERC, CiU	PSC, PP, ICV-EUiA	-	
Puig-reig	4.326	ERC, CiU, IP-EPM (3)	IP-EPM (1)	IP-EPM (1)	24.09.09
Ribes de Freser	2.006	CiU, ERC, ICV-EUiA and PM	-	-	
Riells i Viabrea	3.238				
La Riera de Gaià	1.332				
Ripoll	11.012	ERC and CiU	PSC	-	29.09.09
Roda de Ter	5.671	CiU, ERC and PSC (1)	PSC (2)	PSC (2)	13.10.09
Salt	28.763	CiU, ERC and ICV	PSC and PP	-	
Sant Antoni de Vilamajor	5.332	AIV (1), CiU (5), ERC (4)	PSC (1)	-	14.10.09
Sant Celoni	16.586	CUP (2), CiU (7)	PSC (8)	-	08.10.09
Sant Cugat del Vallès	76.274	CiU (14), ERC (2), ICV (3)	PP (1)	PSC (absent)	19.10.09
Sant Feliu de Codines	5.620				17.10.09
Sant Feliu de Guíxols	20.867				
Sant Feliu Sasserra	633	ERC (7)	-	-	
Sant Fruitós de Bages	7.199	CiU, ERC, Entesa	-	PSC	
Sant Jaume de Frontanyà	29	ERC (1)	-	-	14.10.09
Sant Martí Sarroca	2.721				
Sant Pere de Torelló	2.264				
Sant Pere de Vilamajor	3.891	GISP (1), ISP (1), CiU (3), ERC (2), No adscrit (1)	PSC (1), PP (1)	-	16.10.09
Sant Pere Pescador	1.804	IpSP (5), CiU (1), PSC (3)	-	-	
Sant Pol de Mar	4.773				
Sant Quintí de Mediona	2.039	ERC, PSC and CiU		PP	28.09.09
Sant Quirze de Besora	2.215				
Sant Quirze del Vallès	18.225	ERC, CiU, ICV	PP	PSC	
Sant Sadurní d'Anoia	11.909	ERC, PSC, Alternativa Municipal Independent	CiU and PP		30.09.09
Sant Salvador de Guardiola	3.044	GpC (5), ERC (1), CiU (2), Independent (1)	Independent (1)	EPSSG (1)	16.10.09
Sant Vicenç de Torelló	1.977				
Santa Coloma de Farners	11.412	ERC, CiU, PSC, CxC, ExSC	-	-	
Santa Eugènia de Berga	2.235				
Santa Eulàlia de Riuprimer	1.004				
Santa Maria d'Oló	1.089				
Santa Susanna	2.939				
Santpedor	6.557				
Sarrià de Ter	4.320				
la Secuita	1.269	CiU and ERC			
Sentmenat	7.209	ERC and CiU	PP and PSC	ICV	
Seròs	1.876				
La Seu d'Urgell	12.986	CiU, ERC and ICV	-	PSC and PP	
Solsona	9.166	CiU, ERC, El Comú and PSC	-	-	
Subirats	3.052				
Súria	6.369	ERC, CiU, AIS, GIS	-	PSC and GPS	
Taradell	6.034				
Tàrrega	17.696	CiU, AIPN-PSC (3), ERC and ICV		AIPN-PSC (3)	05.10.09
Teià	5.867				
Tiana	7.505				
Tona	7.805	CiU and Tona Futur			
Tordera	13.420				
Torrelles de Llobregat	4.604	ERC, CiU, and Poble i Progrès		PSC, A.I. Poble	13.10.09
Torroella de Montgrí	11.441				
Vacarisses	5.787				
La Vall d'en Bas	2.790				
Vallirana	12.928	CiU, ERC	ICV, PP	PSC	06.10.09
Valls	25.634				
El Vendrell	34.931				
Vic	38.964	CiU, ERC, CUP and ICV-EUiA	PSC	PxC	07.10.09
Vidreres	6.676				
Viladamat	440				
Viladrau	1.066	independents de l'A, CiU and ERC	-	-	13.10.09
Viladecavalls	7.170				
Vilafranca del Penedès	37.364	CiU, ERC, ICV and CUP	PP	PSC	
Vilanova del Vallès	4.459				
Vilanova i la Geltrú	64.905	CiU, ERC, ICV and CUP	PSC and PP	-	
Vilaplana	584	CiU and ERC	-	PSC	
Vilassar de Dalt	8.476				
Vilassar de Mar	19.052				
Vilobí d'Onyar	2.756				
Vimbodí i Poblet	1.065	ERC			

Municipalities that rejected a motion for the celebretion of a query on Catalonia independence
Municipality	Pob.	For	Against	Abstention	Day
Alpicat	5.900	ERC (1), ICV (2)	CiU (6), PP (1)	PSC (2)	08.10.09
Balaguer	16.341	CiU (5) ERC (1)	PSC (8), PP (1)	ICV (2)	24.09.09
Gavà	44.678	CiU (1), ERC (2), ICV (2)	PP (3), PSC (12), C's (1)	-	24.09.09
Granollers	60.122	CiU (6), ERC (2)	PSC (14), PP (3)	-	29.09.09
Igualada	38.164	ERC (3), CiU (6)	ICV (2), PP (2), PSC (8)	-	15.09.09
Lleida	131.731	ERC (2), CiU (6), ICV (1)	PSC (15), PP (2), Independent (1)	-	25.09.09
Malgrat de Mar	17.822				
Mataró	119.780		PSC and PP		
Mollet del Vallès	51.365	ERC (1), CiU (3)	PSC (15), PP (3)	ICV (3)	28.09.09
Pineda de Mar	25.568				
El Prat de Llobregat	62.663	ERC	ICV-EUiA, PSC, PP	CiU	16.09.09
Ripollet	36.255				
Roses	19.960	ERC, CiU	PP, PSC and GIR	ICV	27.09.09
Rubí	73.691				
Sant Andreu de Llavaneres	9.745				
Sant Feliu de Llobregat	42.628	ERC (1), CiU (3)	PP (2), PSC (8), ICV-EUiA (5)	ICV (2)	29.09.09
Sant Joan de les Abadesses	3.589	ERC	PSC	CiU	25.09.09
Sant Pere de Ribes	28.066	UM9 (4), CiU (3), ERC (1)	PSC (8), PP (2)	ICV (1)	22.09.09
La Selva del Camp	4.821				
Sitges	27.070				
Tarragona	155.536	ERC (2), CiU (8)	PSC (13), PP (4)	-	28.09.09
Torelló	13.680	ERC (3), ICV (1), CiU (3)	PSC (7)	CiU (3)	26.10.09
Tremp	6.190	ERC (2), CiU (4)	PSC (6)	-	15.10.09
Vilanova i la Geltrú	64.905				
Vinyols i els Arcs	1.553				

== Comarcal Councils ==
Comarcal councils for the query. Comarcal councils against de query.

=== Comarcal councils for the query ===
Comarcal councils that support a query on Catalonia independence
Comarca	Pob.	For	Against	Abstention	Day
Alt Camp	44.178	CiU and ERC	PSC	-	30.09.09
Bages	181.346	CiU and ERC	PSC and PP	ICV	23.11.09
Baix Ebre	81.304	CiU and ERC	PSC and Independent	-	09.10.09
Gironès	175.148	CiU and ERC			
Osona	150.139	CiU (3), ERC (1), ICV-EPM (1) and Independents (1)	PSC (2)	CiU (1)	10.12.09

=== Comarcal councils against the query ===
Comarcal councils that have rejected to support a popular query on the independence
Comarca	Pob.	For	Against	Abstention	Day
Priorat	9.869	ERC	PSC and CiU	-	26.11.09
