= Vallbona d'Anoia =

- Municipality
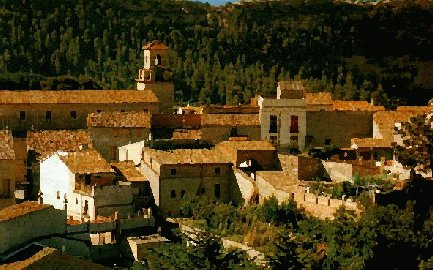

- Coat of arms

- Location in Catalonia Vallbona d'Anoia (Spain)
- Coordinates: 41°31′15″N 1°42′32″E
- Country: Spain
- Community: Catalonia
- Province: Barcelona
- Comarca: Anoia

Government
  - Mayor: Joan Garcia Semitiel (2015)

Area
  - Total: 6.4 km^{2} (2.5 sq mi)
- Elevation: 289 m (948 ft)

Population (2025-01-01)
  - Total: 1,424
  - Density: 220/km^{2} (580/sq mi)
- Demonym: Vallbonenc
- Postal code: 08785
- Website: www.vallbonadanoia.cat

Vallbona d'Anoia (Catalan pronunciation: [ˌbaʎˈβɔnə ðəˈnɔjə]) is a municipality in the comarca of Anoia in Catalonia, Spain. It is situated to the left of the Anoia river, on the road between Piera and Capellades. The town is served by a station on the FGC railway line R6 from Barcelona and Martorell to Igualada.

== Transportation ==
Train line connecting Igualada with Barcelona has a stop for boarding on both ways of the line.
