= Anoia (river) =

River in Catalonia, Spain

Coordinates: 41°35′6.71″N 1°33′50.5″E

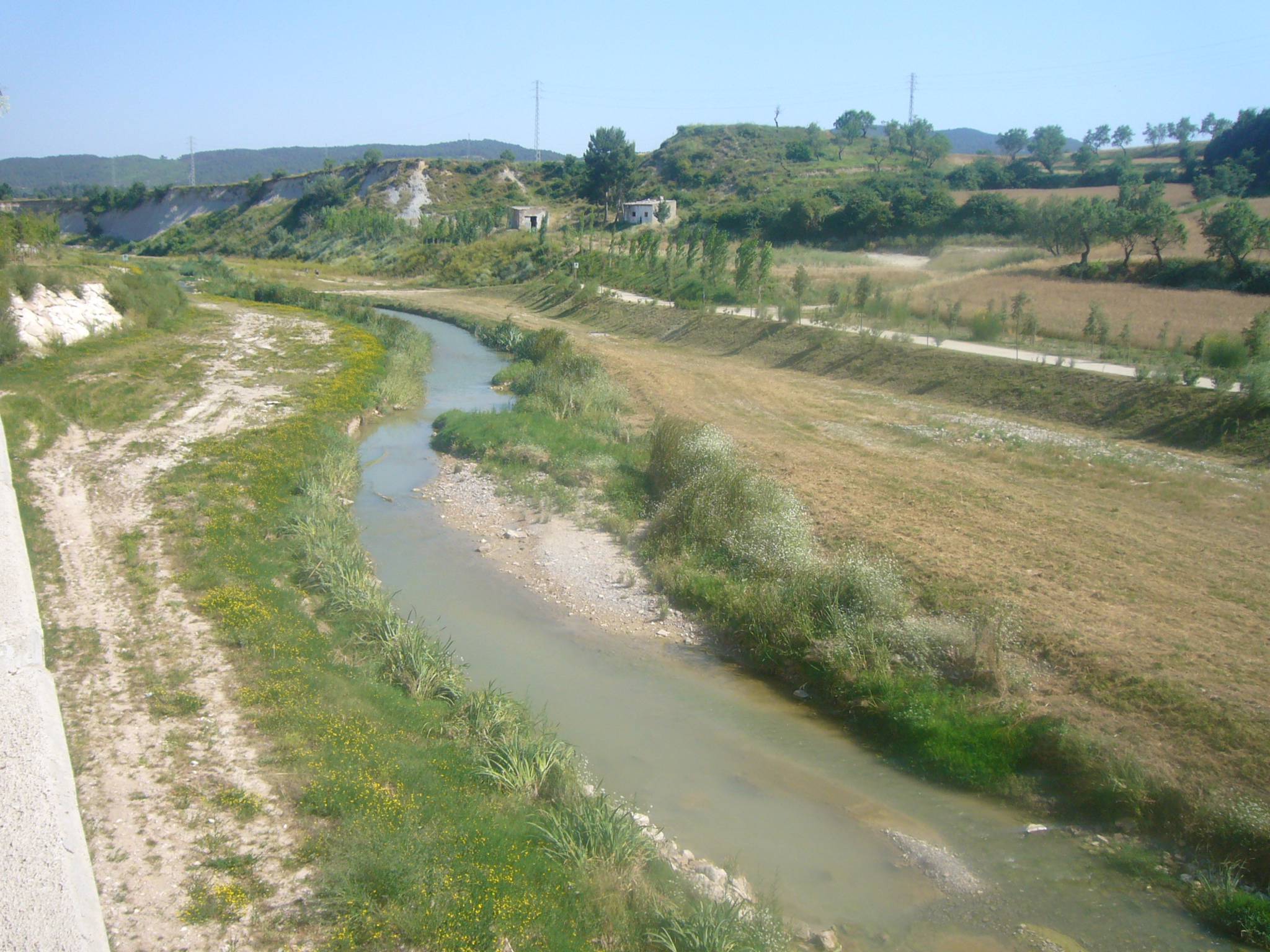
- The Anoia River in Igualada

Location
- Country: Spain

Physical characteristics
- Source
  - location: Calaf, Argençola
  - elevation: 800 metres (2,600 ft)
- Mouth
  - location: Llobregat River in Martorell
- Length: 68 km (42 mi)
- Basin size: 929.4 km^{2} (358.8 sq mi)
- Discharge
  - average: 2.37 cubic metres per second (84 cu ft/s)

Basin features
- River system: Llobregat

The Anoia (Catalan pronunciation: [əˈnɔjə]) is a river in Catalonia, Spain, a tributary of the Llobregat. Most of its course lies within the comarca of the same name. It has four sources, in the municipalities of Calaf, Sant Martí Sesgueioles, Montmaneu, and Argençola, and these streams join together in Jorba to form the Anoia proper. Major towns along the river include Igualada; Capellades, where it crosses the Pre-Coastal Range; Sant Sadurní d'Anoia; Gelida; and finally Martorell (Baix Llobregat), where it joins the Llobregat from the right.

== Economy ==
The Anoia was once a backbone of industry in Catalonia, especially the paper industry. At its height, there were 65 paper mills along the river, particularly in Capellades.

As a result of both downstream industry and intensive agriculture in its headwaters, the Anoia became quite polluted. In Igualada, tanneries and textile manufacturing dumped lignin and lime into the river, and in Capellades, the paper and cardboard industry dumped a waste product called "black liquor." Closer to Martorell, the automotive industry added electrolytics, nickel, chromes, and cyanides to the water. Fortunately, improvements in technology and manufacturing processes have reduced the level of pollution in recent years.

== Tributaries ==
- Riera de Carme
- Riera Gran, which meets the Anoia at Copons.
- Riera de Lavernó, located between Espiells (Sant Sadurní and Torre-ramona (Subirats).
- La Rierussa, which meets the Anoia near Gelida.
- Riu de Bitlles
- Torrent de Can Llopard
- Torrent de Santa Maria

== See also ==
- List of rivers of Spain
