= Piera =

- Municipality
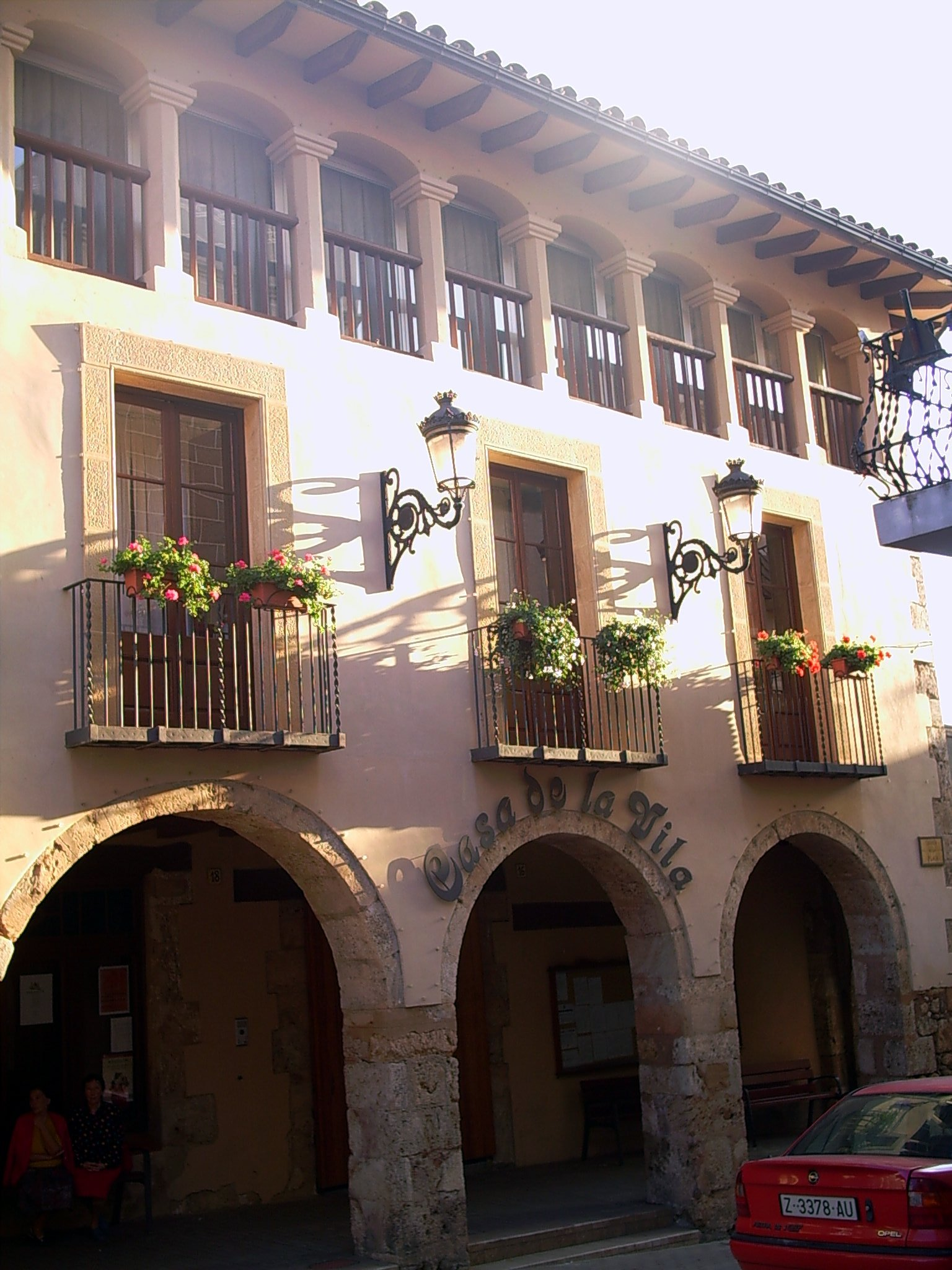
- City hall

- Coat of arms

- Location in Catalonia Piera (Spain)
- Coordinates: 41°31′20″N 1°44′58″E
- Country: Spain
- Community: Catalonia
- Province: Barcelona
- Comarca: Anoia

Government
  - Mayor: Jordi Madrid Roca (2015)

Area
  - Total: 57.2 km^{2} (22.1 sq mi)
- Elevation: 324 m (1,063 ft)

Population (2025-01-01)
  - Total: 17,880
  - Density: 313/km^{2} (810/sq mi)
- Demonym(s): Pierenc, pierenca
- Website: www.viladepiera.cat

Piera (Catalan pronunciation: [piˈeɾə]) is a municipality that covers a large portion of the southeastern corner of the comarca of Anoia in Catalonia, Spain, on the left bank of the Anoia river. The agricultural land, mostly non-irrigated, is used for the cultivation of cereals, grapes, olives and almonds. The town itself hosts a number of light industries: textiles, plastics and construction materials. Tourism during the summer months is also relatively important for the local economy.

The FGC railway line R6 from Martorell and Barcelona to Igualada runs through the town, while local roads lead to Capellades and Sant Sadurní d'Anoia.

Notable monuments include the castle of Fontanet. The castle which was restored in 1916 by Ramon de Viala d'Aiguavives, Baron of Almenar is documented in 955 a.c. and now used for private functions.

The sister of the Baron of Almenar, Isabel de Viala d'Aiguavives also financed and patroned the modernist church of Ca n'Aguilera which was donated to Barcelona's Bishop by Zaragoza de Viala family in 1921. The architect of Ca n'Aguilera modernist church is Francesc Berenguer i Mestres, who was Antoni Gaudí's disciple and personal friend.

Another Piera relevant monument is the church of Santa Maria, with both Gothic and Roman elements.

== Subdivisions ==
The municipality of Piera includes several outlying villages (barris): these are usually distinguished into the older, traditional settlements (barris antics) and the newer urbanisations which have been developed to cope with the expansion of the municipality (barris nous). Populations are given for 1999, from the Ajuntament de Piera and cited in Història de Piera: the town of Piera (nucli urbà) had a population of 5,036 at that date, whereas the total population of the municipality was 8,551.

=== Traditional barris ===
- El Bedorc (237), on the Anoia river
- Ca n'Aguilera (161)
- Can Cairot (28)
- Can Creixell (2)
- La Fortesa (57), on the Anoia river at the southern point of the municipality
- Sant Jaume Sesoliveres (213)

=== Newer barris ===
- Bosc de l'Àliga (88)
- Can Bonastre (490)
- Can Bou (93)
- Can Canals (602)
- Can Claramunt (494)
- Can Martí (222)
- Can Mas (427)
- Can Mata (166)
- Castell de la Ventosa (51)
- La Grua (20)
- Vallbonica (26), on the road to Vallbona d'Anoia
- La Venta i Can Musarro (138)

== Demography ==
1900	1930	1950	1970	1986	2007
2663	3474	3334	3813	5215	13,652

== Twin towns ==
Piera is twinned with:

- Estepa, Spain

== Transportation ==
Train line connecting Igualada with Barcelona has a stop for boarding on both ways of the line.

== Independence declaration ==
On 30 October 2012, Piera proclaimed itself as a Free Catalan Territory.
