= Anoia (disambiguation) =

Anoia may refer to:

- Anoia (comarca), one of the basic administrative divisions in Catalonia, Spain, with 114,000 inhabitants
  - Anoia (river), a Catalan river mainly within the comarca
- Anoia, Calabria, Italian commune with 2,378 inhabitants

== Literature ==
- A minor goddess in Terry Pratchett's Discworld series of novels, Anoia is the Goddess of Things That Get Stuck in Drawers.
