= Riera de Carme =

River in the Catalonia Region of Spain

Coordinates: 41.5503°N 1.6776°E

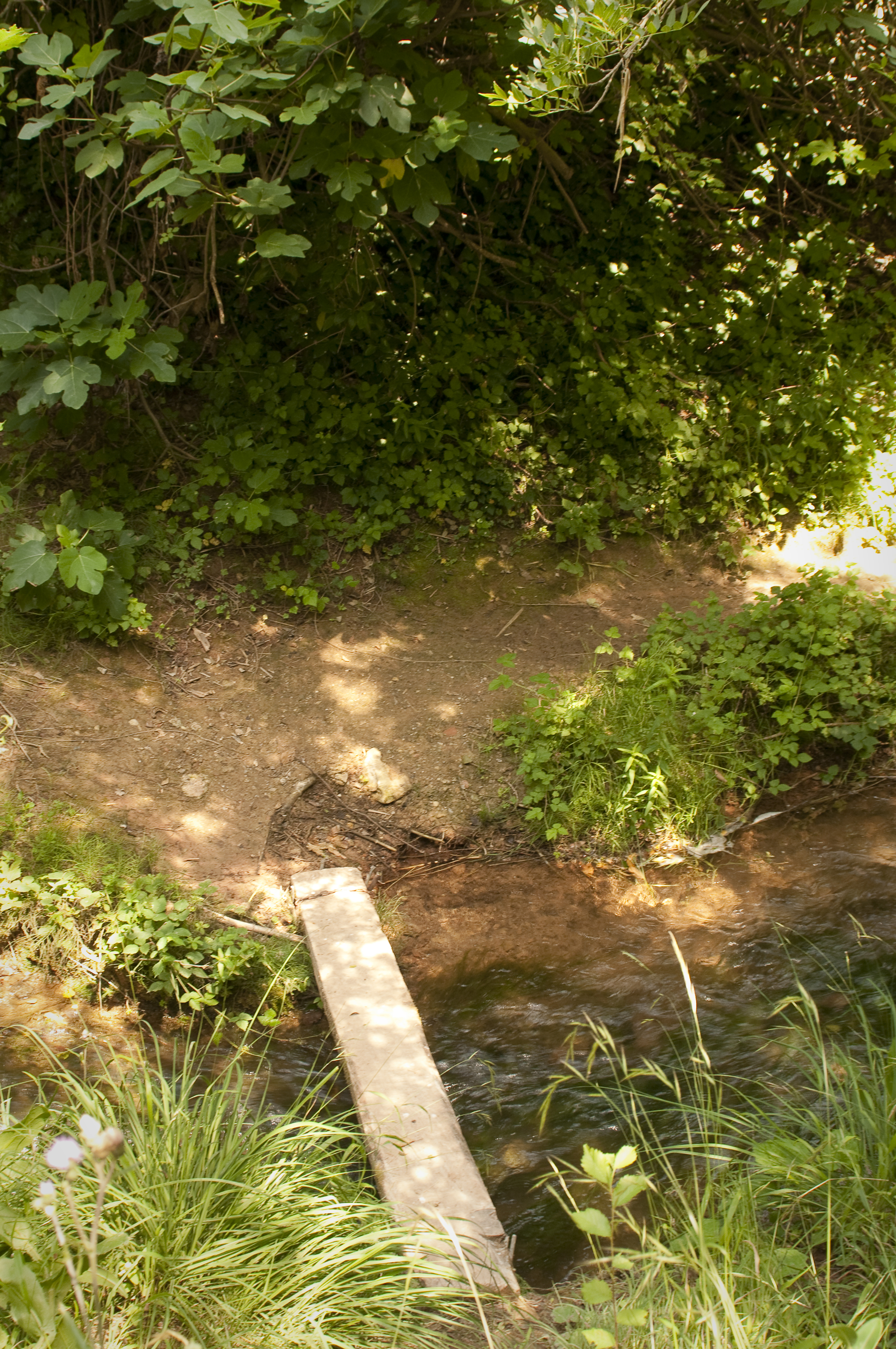
Riera de Carme, 2011

Riera de Carme (Carme River) (27 km) is a river in the Anoia region of Catalonia, Spain.

== Location ==
The Carme River runs between the towns of Santa Heraklion, Orpí, Carme and La Pobla de Claramunt in the Carmen Valley. It is the main tributary of the Anoia river, along with other smaller streams such as Montbui Castellolí.

The Carme River is located above the Carme - Capellades aquifer, resulting in the continuous presence of water on the ground, either visible or below ground.

== History ==
Until the late 19th century, the river was call the Riera Nova or Noia. This was seen in early notarial documents. The data show that, at least until 1825, it was still called Noya or Noia.

== Nature, flora and fauna ==
Most of the vegetation along the Carme River is deciduous. Several meters from the water's edge, one sees evergreen trees, mainly pine. Studies indicated that the area was originally populated by oaks. Shrubs, bushes and pine are the most common plants.

The wildlife include snakes, turtles, wild boar, rabbit, hare or badger common. There are over 85 bird species. The most common include swallows, robins, blue duck head or cute, executioner, the shrike, black crows or Serin.
