= Sant Martí =

Sant Martí (the Catalan form of Saint Martin) may refer to the following places in Catalonia, Spain:

- Sant Martí (district), a district of Barcelona
  - Sant Martí (Barcelona Metro), a railway station
- Sant Martí, Biure, a church located in the municipality of Sagàs
- Sant Martí de Llémena, a municipality in the province of Girona
- Sant Martí de Provençals, a neighborhood in the Sant Martí district of Barcelona
- Sant Martí de Riucorb, a municipality in the Province of Lleida
- Sant Martí de Tous, a municipality in the comarca of Anoia
- Sant Martí d'Empúries, a municipality in the comarca of Alt Empordà
- Sant Martí Sarroca, a municipality in the comarca of Alt Penedès
- Sant Martí Sesgueioles, a municipality in the comarca of Anoia
- Sant Martí Vell, a village in the province of Girona

== See also ==
- Saint Martin (disambiguation)
