= Castellfollit =

Castellfollit may refer to the following places in Spain:

- Castellfollit de la Roca, a municipality in the comarca of Garrotxa, in the province of Girona, Catalonia
- Castellfollit de Riubregós, a municipality in the comarca of the Anoia in Catalonia
- Castellfollit del Boix, a village in the province of Barcelona and autonomous community of Catalonia
