= Argençola =

- Municipality
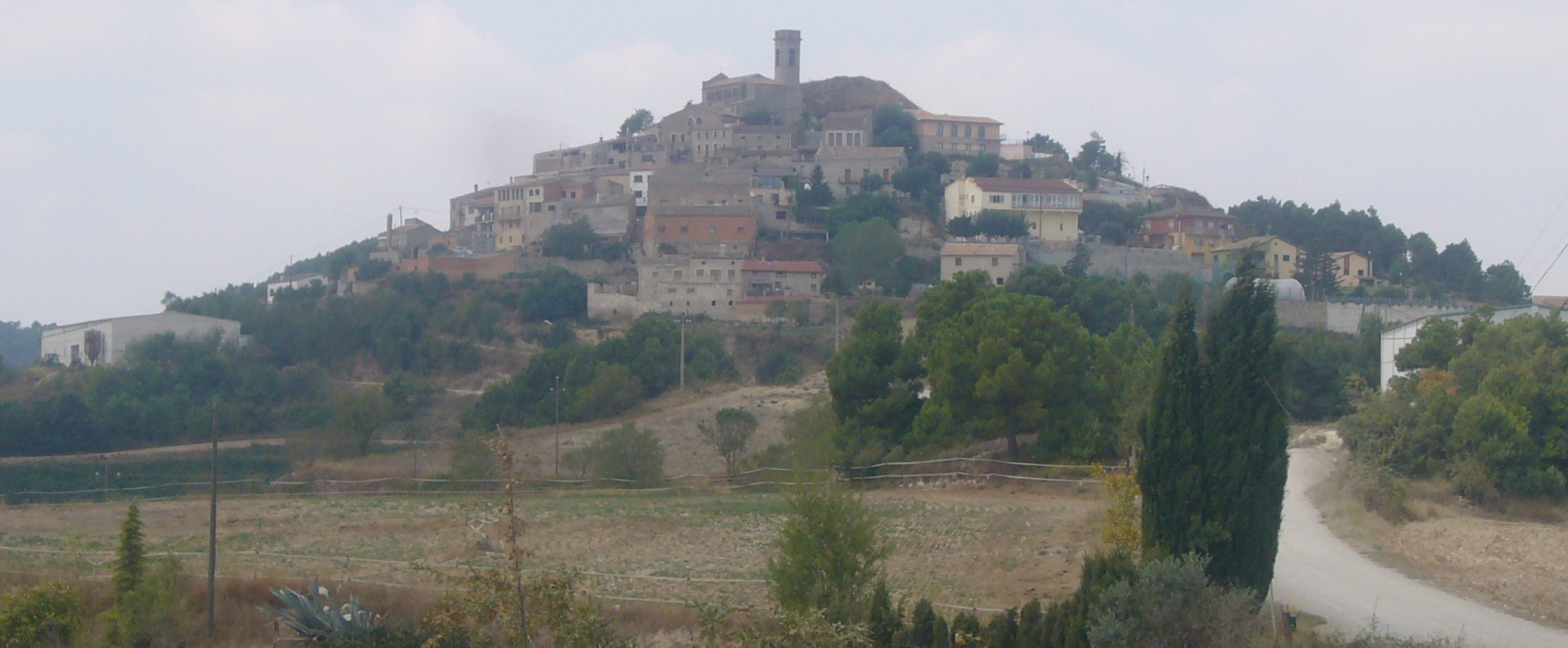

- Coat of arms

- Location in Catalonia Argençola (Spain)
- Coordinates: 41°35′54″N 1°26′37″E
- Country: Spain
- Community: Catalonia
- Province: Barcelona
- Comarca: Anoia

Government
  - Mayor: Antoni Lloret Grau (2015)

Area
  - Total: 47.1 km^{2} (18.2 sq mi)
- Elevation: 716 m (2,349 ft)

Population (2025-01-01)
  - Total: 245
  - Density: 5.20/km^{2} (13.5/sq mi)
- Demonyms: Argençolenc, argençolenca
- Website: www.argencola.cat

Argençola (Catalan pronunciation: [əɾʒənˈsɔlə]) is a municipality in the comarca of the Anoia in Catalonia, Spain. It is situated in the east of the comarca, bordering the Segarra and the Conca de Barberà. The Anoia river has its source on the territory of the municipality. A local road links the municipality with the main N-II road from Barcelona to Lleida.

== Demography ==
1900	1930	1950	1970	1986	2007
510	658	622	239	192	229

== Subdivisions ==
The municipality of Argençola includes six outlying villages. Populations are given as of 2001:

- Carbasi (30), to the north-east of Argençola at an elevation of 775 m
- Clariana (36), to the east of Argençola, with ruins of Clariana castle
- Contrast (18), to the south-east of Argençola
- Els Plans de Ferran (7)
- Porquerisses i Aberells (41), to the north of Argençola
- Rocamora (8), to the west of Argençola
