= Veciana =

- Municipality
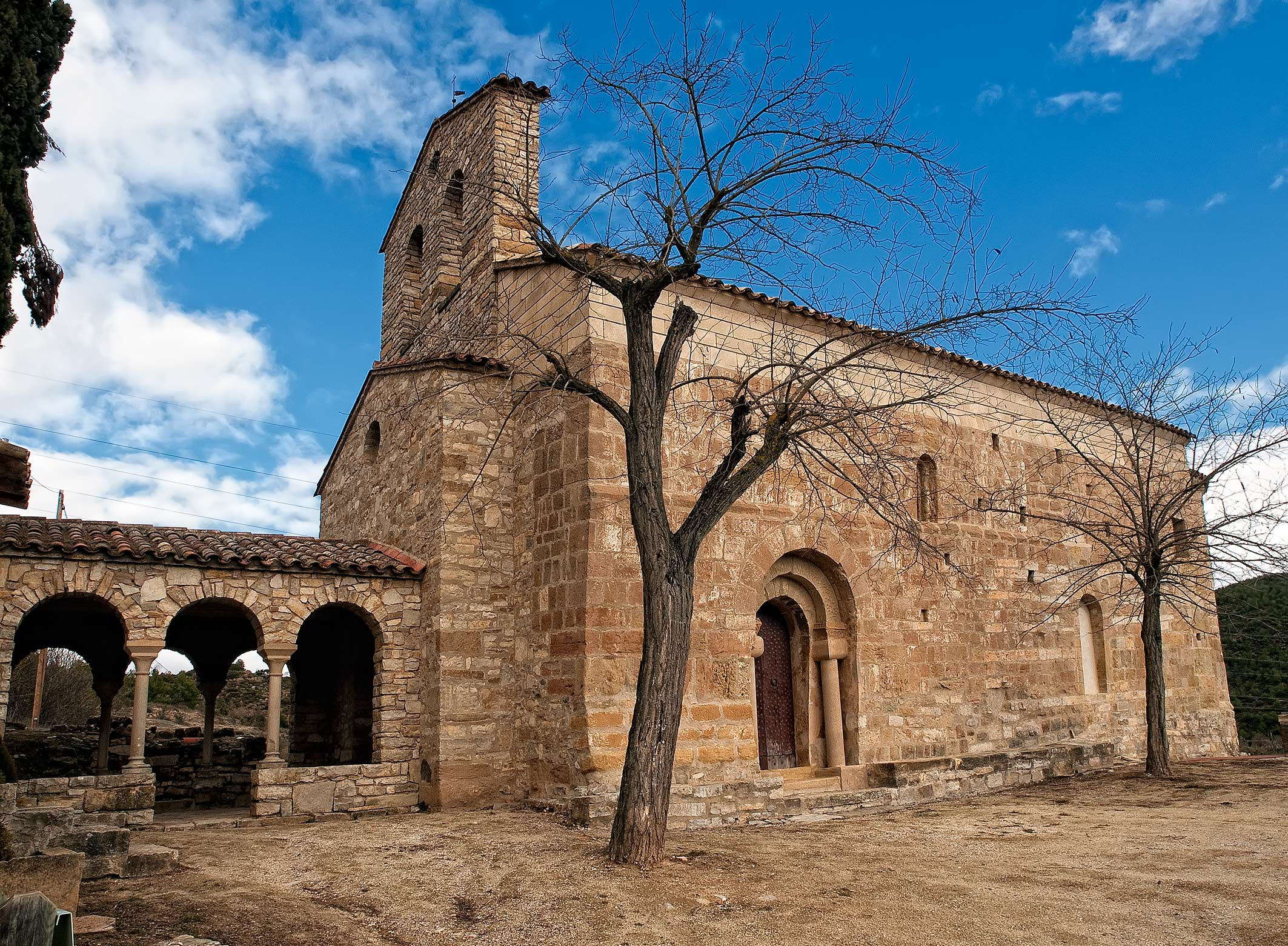
- St. Mary's church, Veciana (12th c.)

- Flag Coat of arms

- Location in Catalonia Veciana (Spain)
- Coordinates: 41°39′30″N 1°29′22″E
- Country: Spain
- Community: Catalonia
- Province: Barcelona
- Comarca: Anoia

Government
  - Mayor: Jordi Servitje Turull (2015)

Area
  - Total: 38.9 km^{2} (15.0 sq mi)

Population (2025-01-01)
  - Total: 168
  - Density: 4.32/km^{2} (11.2/sq mi)
- Website: www.veciana.cat

Veciana (Catalan pronunciation: [bəsiˈanə]) is a municipality in the comarca of the Anoia in Catalonia, Spain. The municipality is split into two parts, the bigger northern part containing Veciana village.
