= Calonge de Segarra =

- Municipality
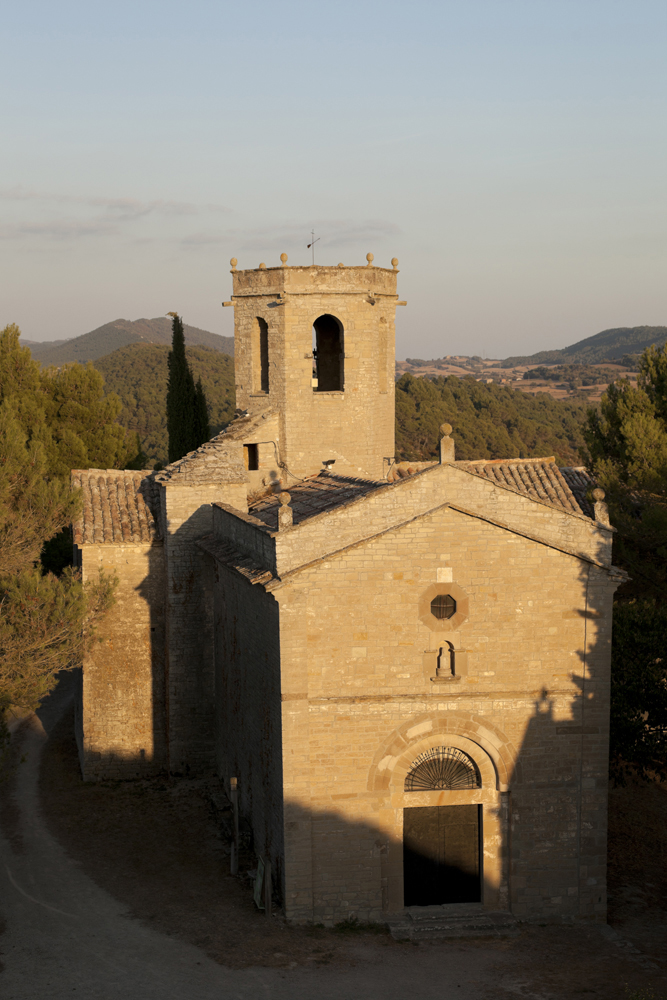
- Santa Fe church, Calonge

- Flag Coat of arms

- Location in Catalonia Calonge de Segarra (Spain)
- Coordinates: 41°45′57″N 1°28′57″E
- Country: Spain
- Community: Catalonia
- Province: Barcelona
- Comarca: Anoia

Government
  - Mayor: Xavier Nadal Masana (2015)

Area
  - Total: 37.2 km^{2} (14.4 sq mi)

Population (2025-01-01)
  - Total: 179
  - Density: 4.81/km^{2} (12.5/sq mi)
- Website: calongesegarra.cat

Calonge de Segarra (Catalan pronunciation: [kəˈlɔɲʒə ðə səˈɣarə]) is a municipality in the comarca of the Anoia in Catalonia, Spain.
