= Castellolí =

- Municipality
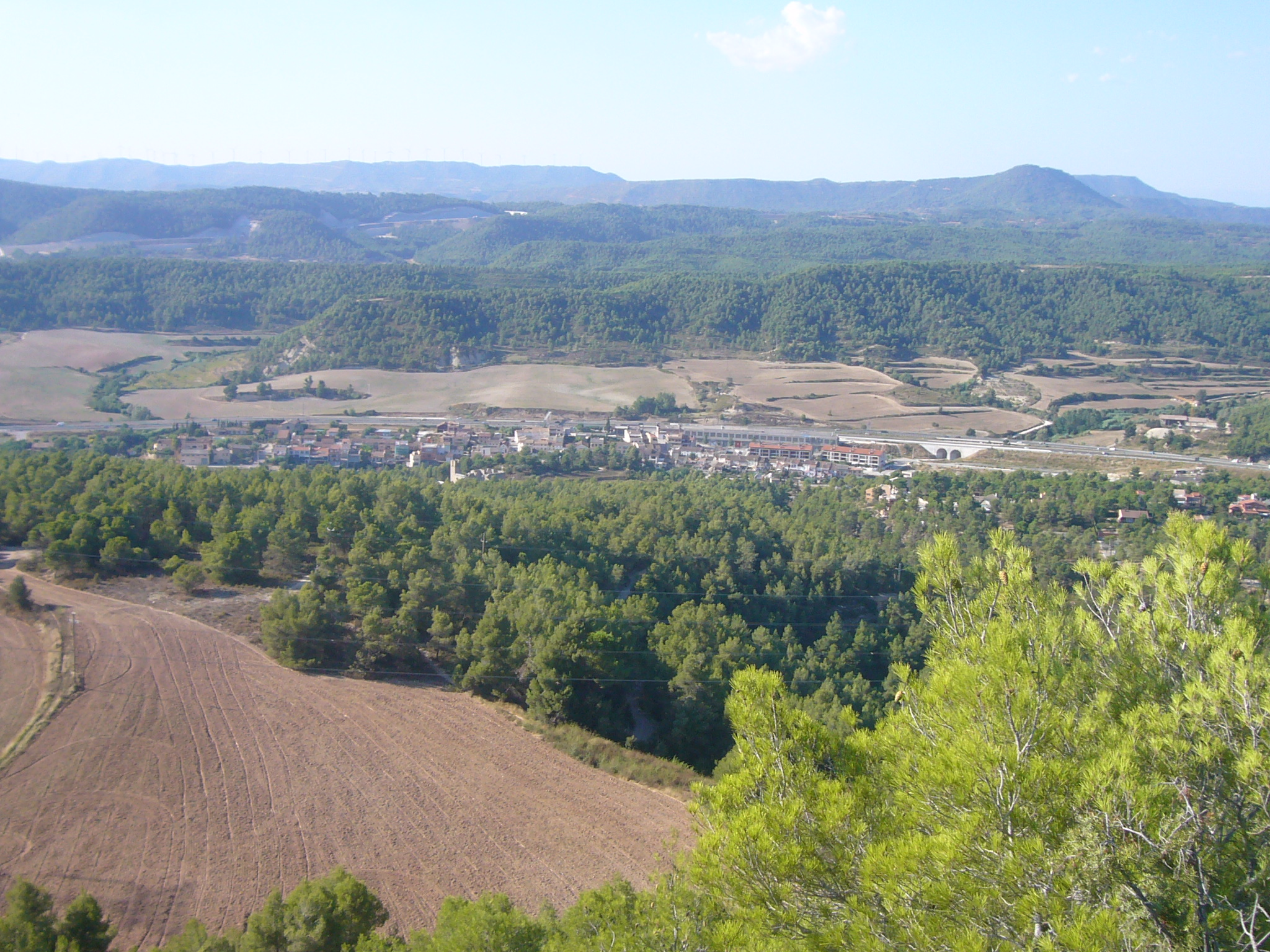
- Castellolí

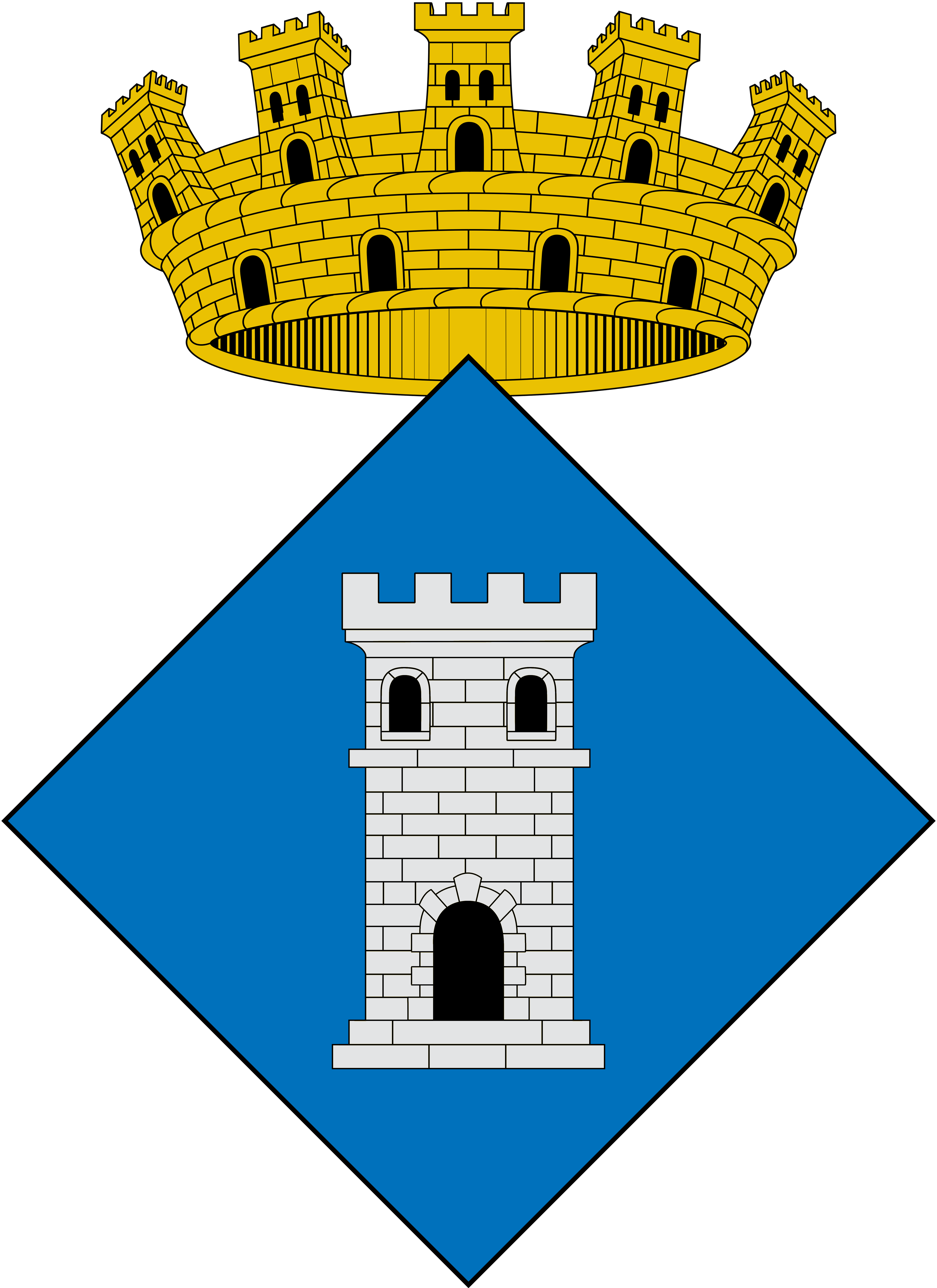
- Coat of arms

- Location in Catalonia Castellolí (Spain)
- Coordinates: 41°36′1″N 1°42′5″E
- Country: Spain
- Community: Catalonia
- Province: Barcelona
- Comarca: Anoia

Government
  - Mayor: Joan Serra Muset (2015)

Area
  - Total: 25.3 km^{2} (9.8 sq mi)

Population (2025-01-01)
  - Total: 669
  - Density: 26.4/km^{2} (68.5/sq mi)
- Website: castelloli.cat

Castellolí (Catalan pronunciation: [kəsˌteʎuˈli]) is a municipality in the comarca area of the Anoia in Catalonia, Spain.
