= La Torre de Claramunt =

- Municipality
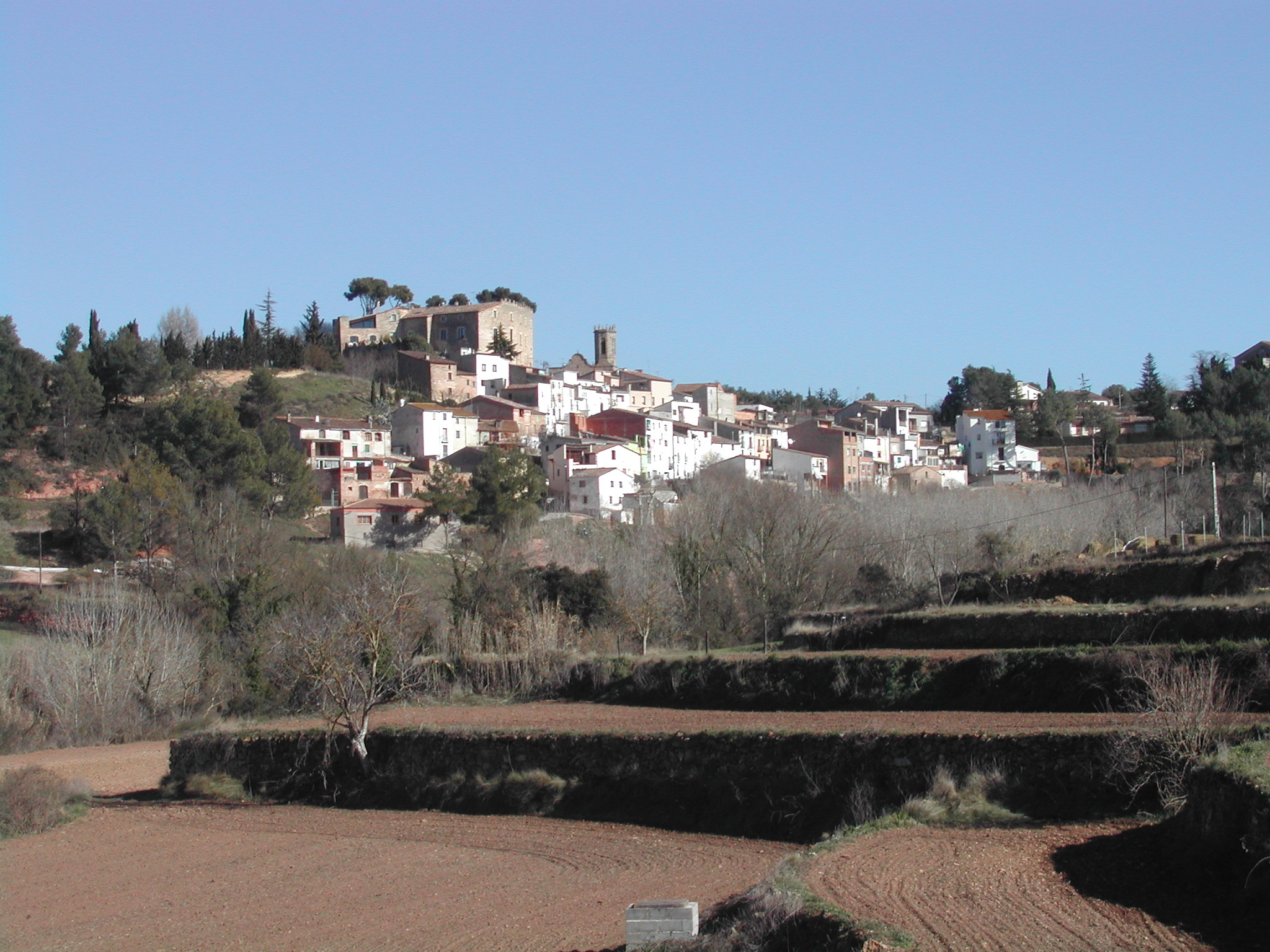

- Coat of arms

- Location in Catalonia La Torre de Claramunt (Spain)
- Coordinates: 41°32′7″N 1°39′39″E
- Country: Spain
- Community: Catalonia
- Province: Barcelona
- Comarca: Anoia

Government
  - Mayor: Quim Morales Mestres (2019)

Area
  - Total: 15.0 km^{2} (5.8 sq mi)

Population (2025-01-01)
  - Total: 4,158
  - Density: 277/km^{2} (718/sq mi)
- Website: www.latorredeclaramunt.cat

La Torre de Claramunt (Catalan pronunciation: [lə ˈtorə ðə kləɾəˈmun]) is a municipality in the comarca of the Anoia in Catalonia, Spain.

The shoe-making company Munich has its main factory in Vilanova d'Espoia, a village located in La Torre de Claramunt.
