= Santa Maria de Miralles =

- Municipality
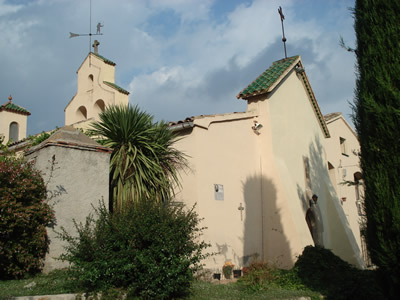
- Church of Sant Romà

- Coat of arms

- Location in Catalonia Santa Maria de Miralles (Spain)
- Coordinates: 41.500°N 1.528°E
- Country: Spain
- Community: Catalonia
- Province: Barcelona
- Comarca: Anoia

Government
  - Mayor: Pere Argelich Pujadó (2015)

Area
  - Total: 25.0 km^{2} (9.7 sq mi)

Population (2025-01-01)
  - Total: 144
  - Density: 5.76/km^{2} (14.9/sq mi)
- Website: www.santamariademiralles.cat

Santa Maria de Miralles (Catalan pronunciation: [ˈsantə məˈɾiə ðə miˈɾaʎəs]) is a municipality in the comarca of the Anoia in Catalonia, Spain.
