= Capellades Paper Mill Museum =

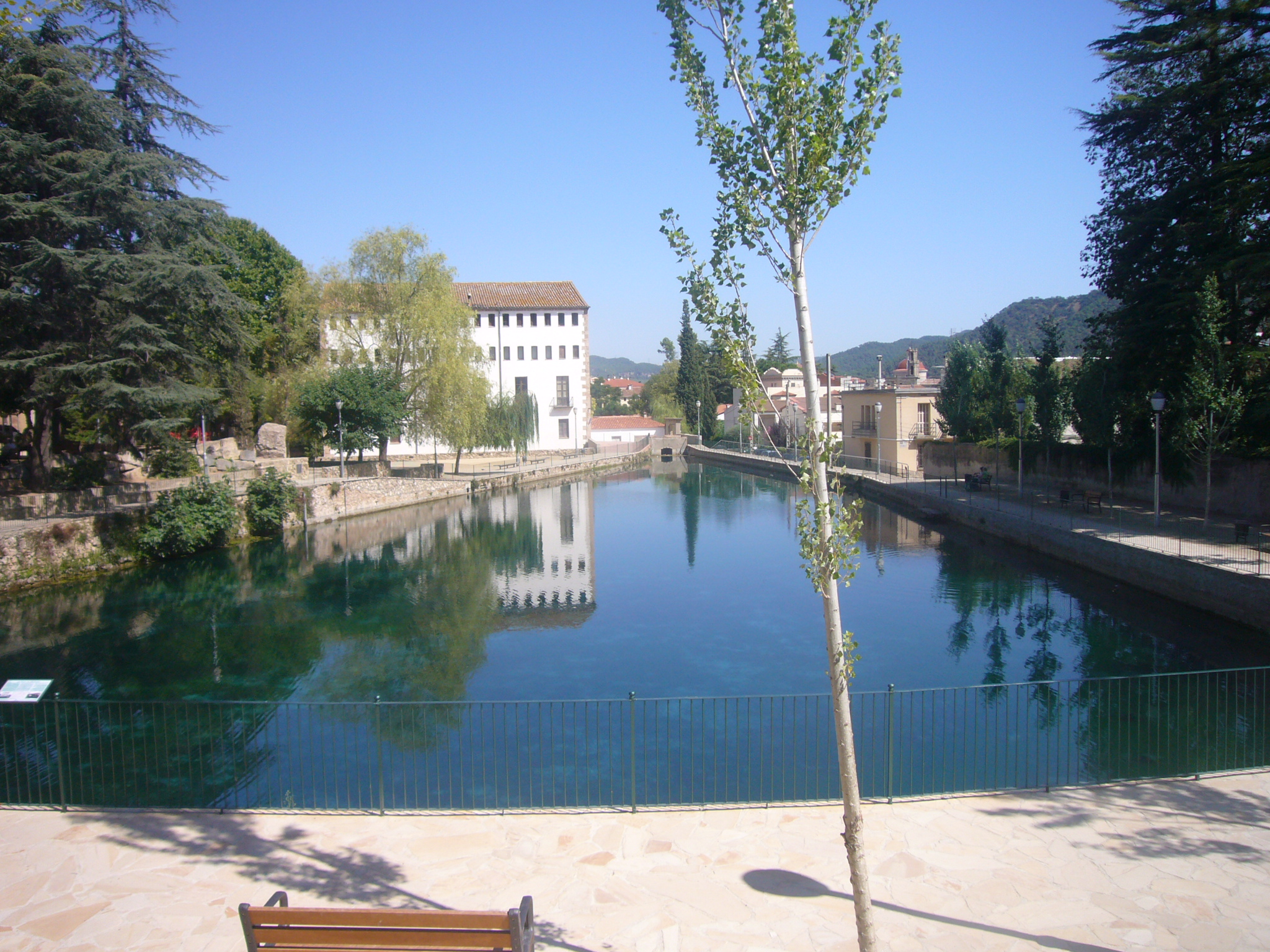
- The museum building
- Established: 1958
- Location: Capellades, Spain
- Coordinates: 41°31′43″N 1°41′3″E
- Type: Technical Museum
- Website: Official site

The Capellades Paper Mill Museum (Catalan: Museu Molí Paperer de Capellades) is a museum about paper located in the town of Capellades. The museum is located in an old paper mill called the Molí de la Vila. It is one of the most important museums in the world on the subject of papermaking. Its collection is based on a series of traditional papermaking machines and papers and documents from the 13th century. It is part of the Science and Technology Museum of Catalonia.

== Exhibition ==
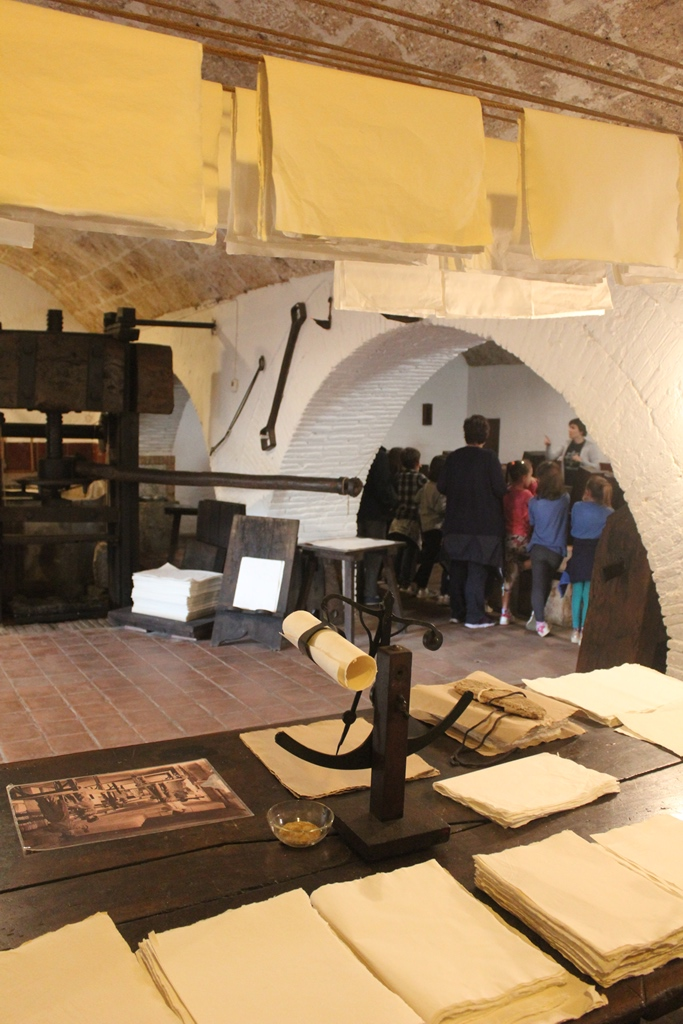
Drying the paper

The main exhibition tells the history of paper, from the most traditional system to the printing technologies of the 21st century. In the basement, where paper is still made by hand, visitors can observe the artistry behind the paper making process.
