= Sant Pere Sallavinera =

- Municipality
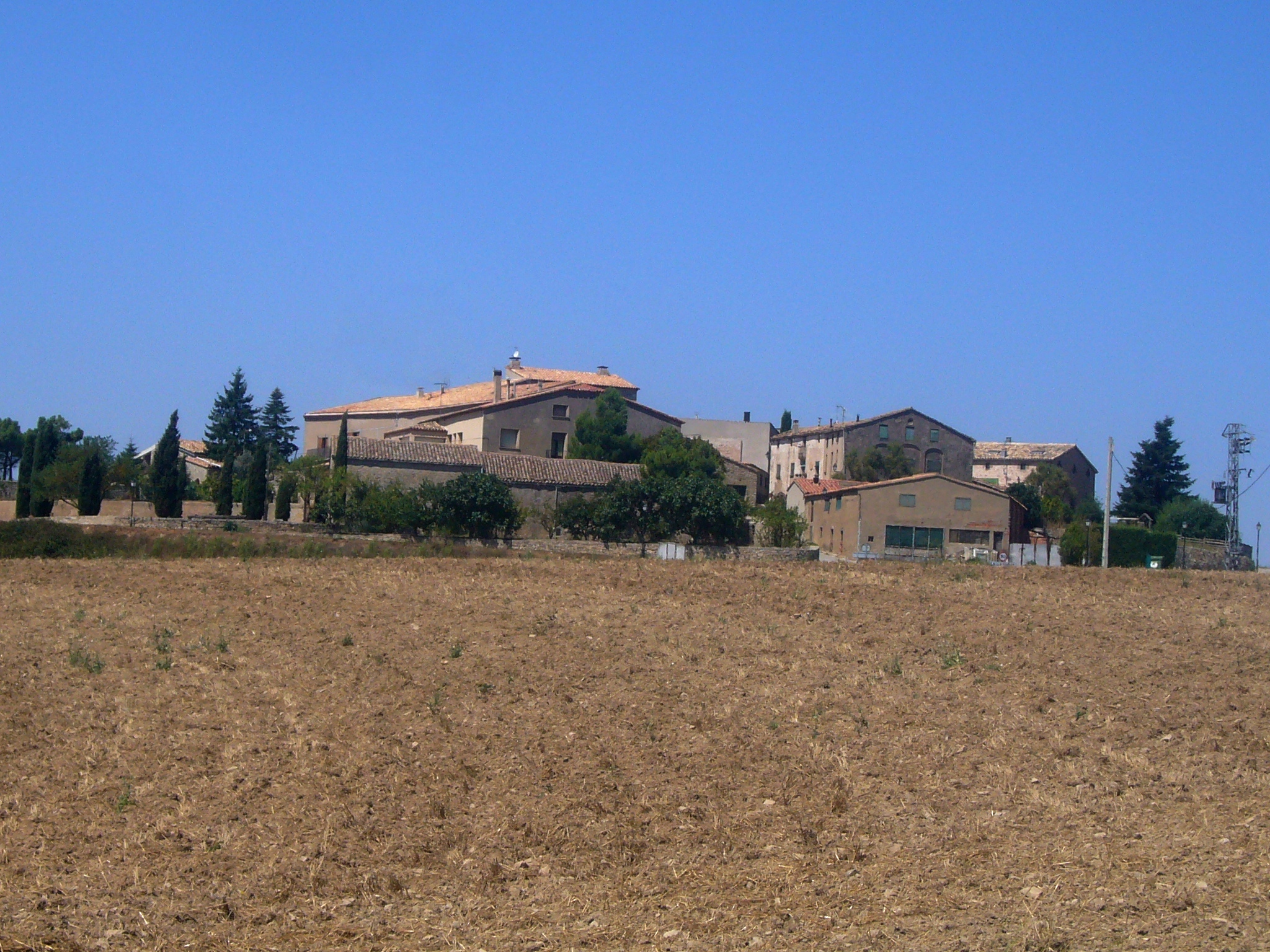
- La Llavinera village

- Flag Coat of arms

- Location in Catalonia Sant Pere Sallavinera (Spain)
- Coordinates: 41°44′18″N 1°34′32″E
- Country: Spain
- Community: Catalonia
- Province: Barcelona
- Comarca: Anoia

Government
  - Mayor: Montserrat Noguera Cantacorps (2015)

Area
  - Total: 22.0 km^{2} (8.5 sq mi)

Population (2025-01-01)
  - Total: 177
  - Density: 8.05/km^{2} (20.8/sq mi)
- Website: www.sallavinera.cat

Sant Pere Sallavinera (Catalan pronunciation: [ˈsam ˈpeɾə səʎəβiˈneɾə]) is a municipality in the comarca of the Anoia in Catalonia, Spain.
