= Vilanova del Camí =

- Municipality
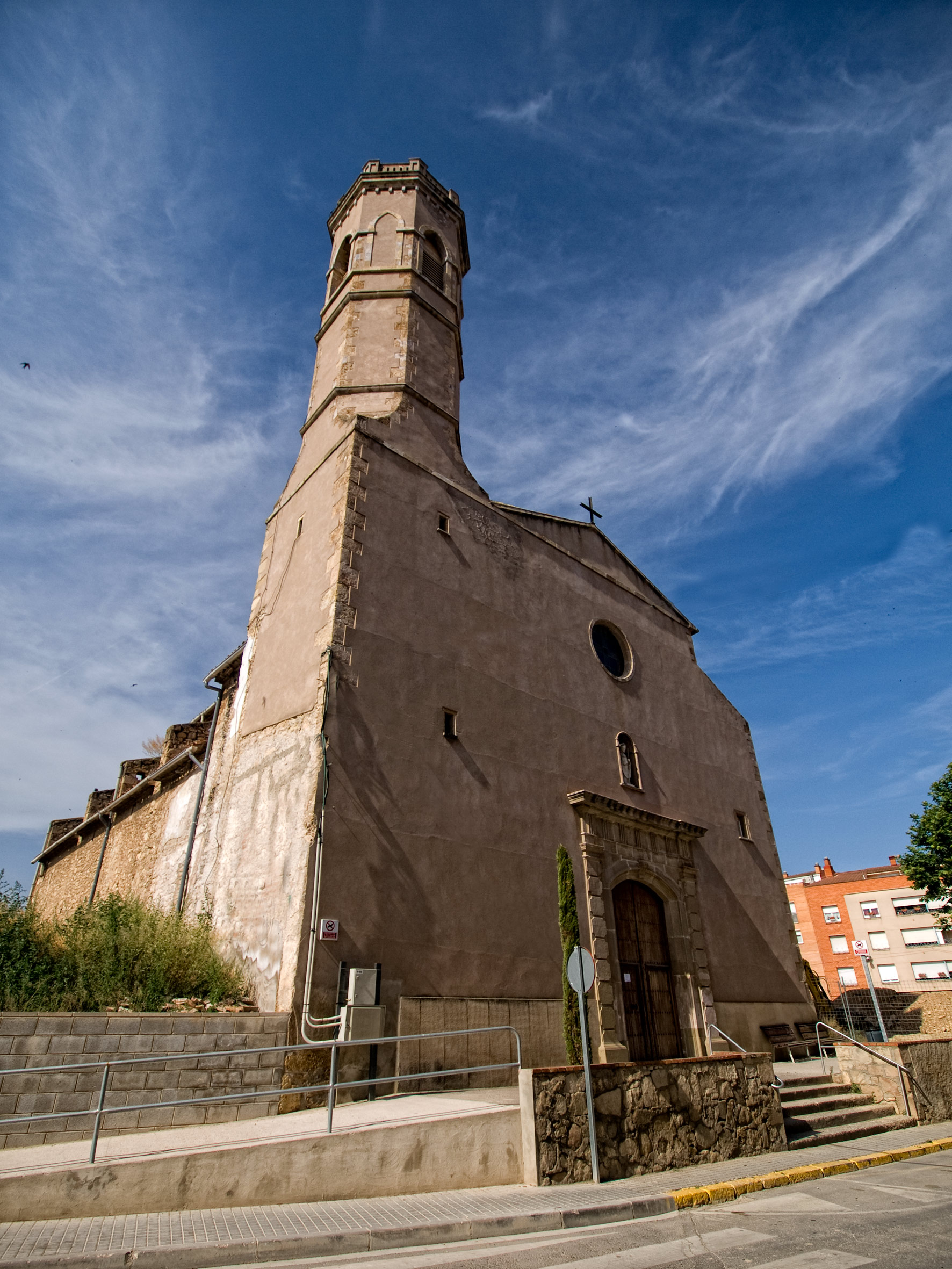
- Church of St. Hilarius.

- Flag Coat of arms

- Location in Catalonia Vilanova del Camí (Spain)
- Coordinates: 41°34′N 1°38′E
- Country: Spain
- Community: Catalonia
- Province: Barcelona
- Comarca: Anoia

Government
  - Mayor: Noemi Trucharte Cervera

Area
  - Total: 10.3 km^{2} (4.0 sq mi)
- Elevation: 302 m (991 ft)

Population (2025-01-01)
  - Total: 12,936
  - Density: 1,260/km^{2} (3,250/sq mi)
- Demonym: Vilanovíns
- Postal code: 08788
- Website: www.vilanovadelcami.cat

Vilanova del Camí (Catalan pronunciation: [ˌbiləˈnɔβə ðəl kəˈmi]) is a municipality in the comarca of the Anoia in Catalonia, Spain. The name literally means "New Town of the Route", the route being the road from Igualada to Vilafranca del Penedès (now the C-244). It is situated in the centre of the Òdena Basin immediately to the south-east of Igualada. The town is served by a station on the FGC railway line R6 from Barcelona and Martorell to Igualada. There are several sizable industrial parks, serving the entire area.

== Transportation ==
Train line connecting Igualda with Barcelona has a stop for boarding on both ways of the line.

== Twin towns ==
- Calcinaia, Italy
- Amilly, France
