= Pujalt =

- Municipality
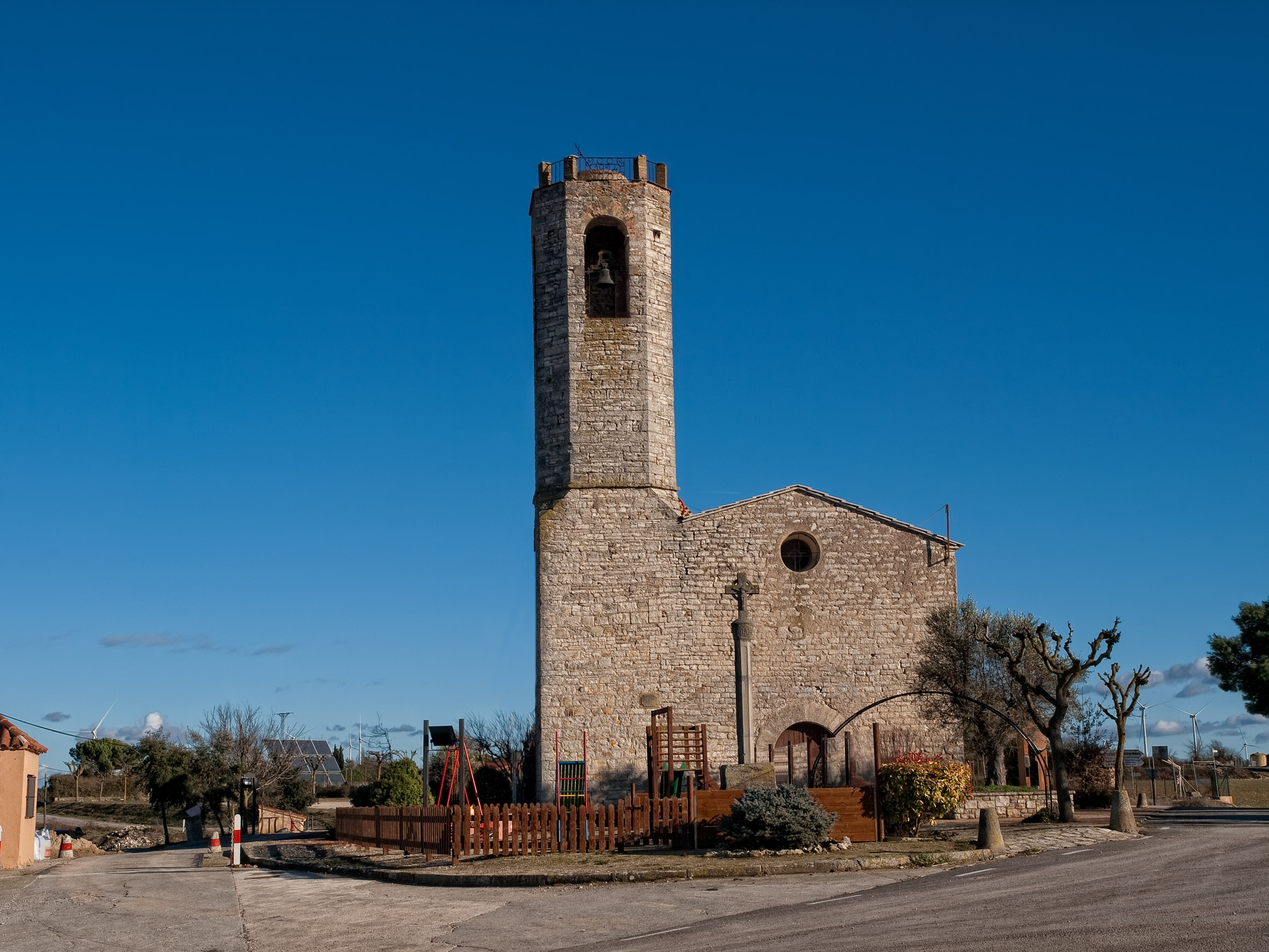
- St. Andrew's church, Pujalt

- Coat of arms

- Location in Catalonia Pujalt (Spain)
- Coordinates: 41°43′6″N 1°25′18″E
- Country: Spain
- Community: Catalonia
- Province: Barcelona
- Comarca: Anoia

Government
  - Mayor: Antoni De Solà Pereta (2015)

Area
  - Total: 31.4 km^{2} (12.1 sq mi)

Population (2025-01-01)
  - Total: 204
  - Density: 6.50/km^{2} (16.8/sq mi)
- Website: pujalt.cat

Pujalt (Catalan pronunciation: [puˈʒal]) is a municipality in the comarca of the Anoia in Catalonia, Spain.

It comprises the settlements of Pujalt (2013 population: 94), Conill (45), L'Astor (33), La Guàrdia Pilosa (14), and Vilamajor (12).
