= Calaf =

- Municipality
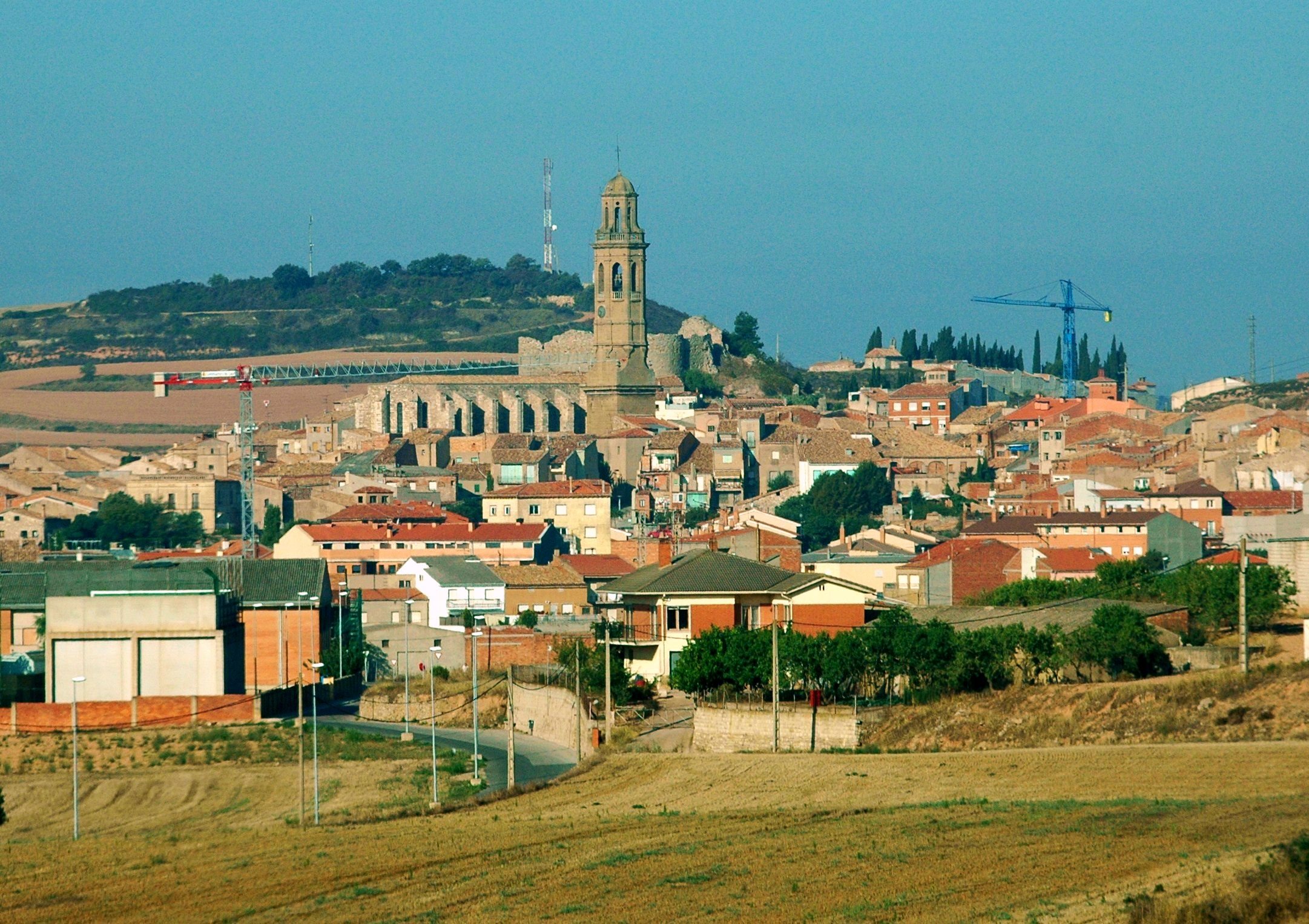

- Flag Coat of arms

- Location in Catalonia Calaf (Spain)
- Coordinates: 41°44′N 1°31′E
- Country: Spain
- Community: Catalonia
- Province: Barcelona
- Comarca: Anoia

Government
  - Mayor: Jordi Badia Perea (2015)

Area
  - Total: 9.2 km^{2} (3.6 sq mi)
- Elevation: 680 m (2,230 ft)

Population (2025-01-01)
  - Total: 3,644
  - Density: 400/km^{2} (1,000/sq mi)
- Demonym: Calafins
- Postal code: 08280
- Website: www.calaf.cat

Calaf (Catalan pronunciation: [kəˈlaf]) is the main town in the northern portion of the comarca of the Anoia in Catalonia, Spain, situated on the Calaf Plain. The town holds an important weekly livestock market.

It is served by the main N-II road from Barcelona to Lleida, the Renfe railway line from Manresa to Lleida and the C-1412 road from Igualada to Ponts. Calaf also has an exit from the new C25 that crosses Catalonia from Girona to Lleida. The remains of Calaf castle dominate the town from a hilltop.

== Subdivisions ==
The village of La Pineda (population (2005): 195) is included within the municipality of Calaf.
