= Sant Martí de Tous =

- Municipality
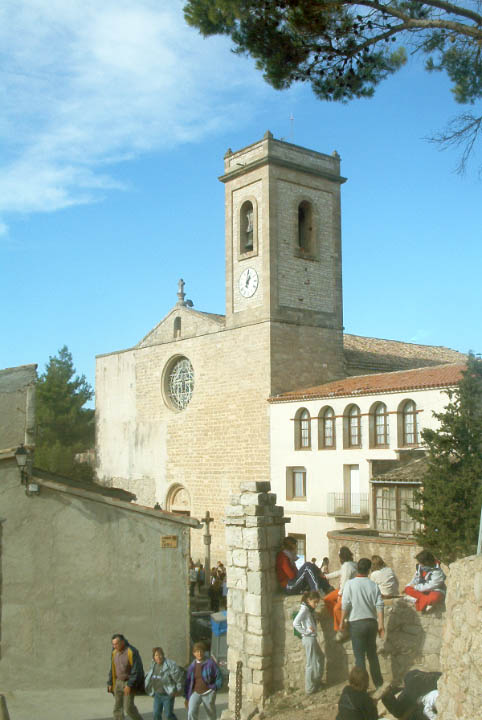
- Parish church

- Flag Coat of arms

- Location in Catalonia Sant Martí de Tous (Spain)
- Coordinates: 41°33′43″N 1°31′29″E
- Country: Spain
- Community: Catalonia
- Province: Barcelona
- Comarca: Anoia

Government
  - Mayor: David Alquézar Claramunt (2015)

Area
  - Total: 39.2 km^{2} (15.1 sq mi)

Population (2025-01-01)
  - Total: 1,269
  - Density: 32.4/km^{2} (83.8/sq mi)
- Website: www.tous.cat

Sant Martí de Tous (Catalan pronunciation: [ˈsam məɾˈti ðə ˈtows]) is a municipality in the comarca of the Anoia in Catalonia, Spain.

== Transportation ==
C241e road connects the municipality with nearby city of Igualada.
