= Orpí =

- Municipality
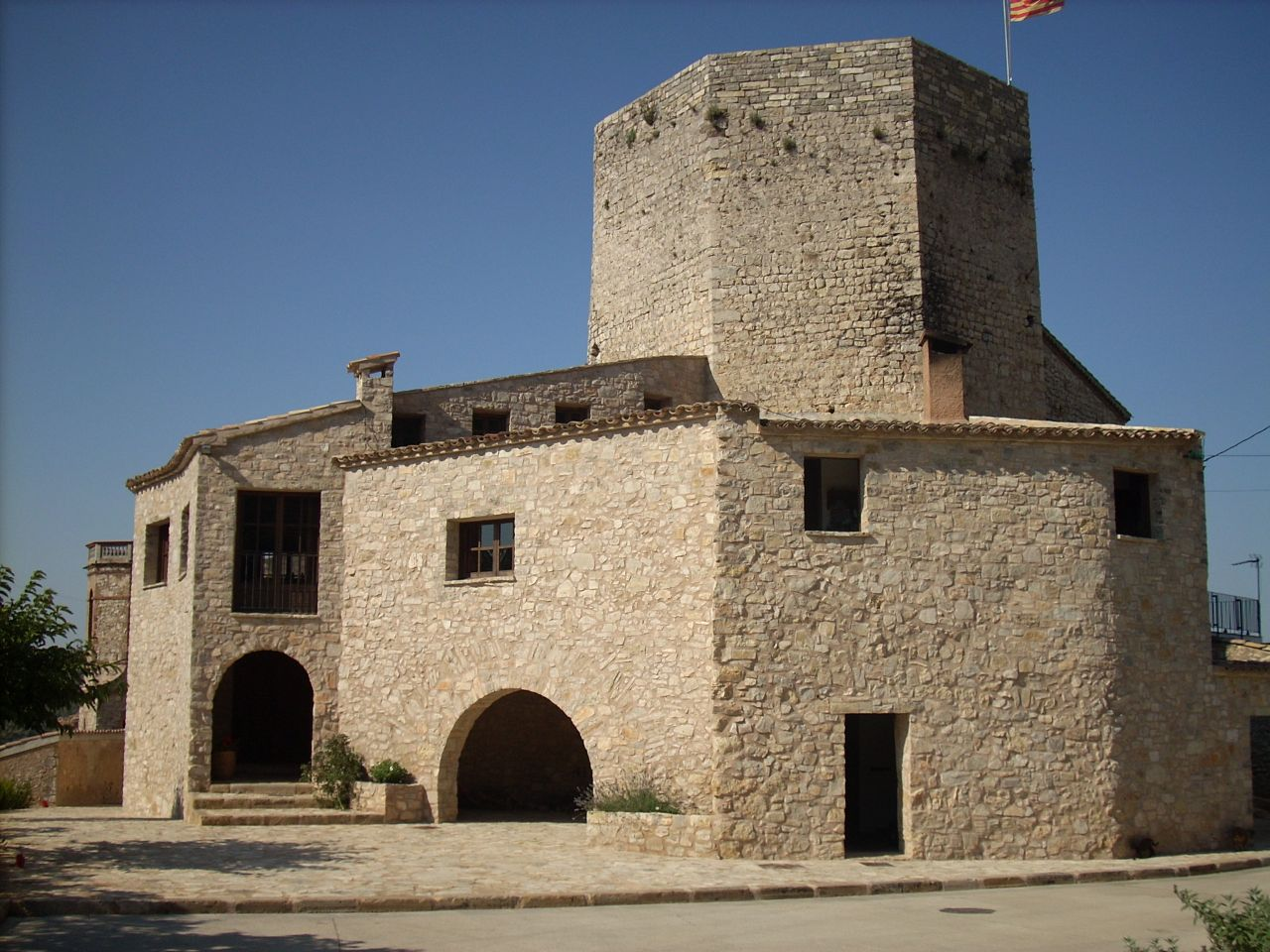
- Orpí castle

- Coat of arms

- Location in Catalonia Orpí (Spain)
- Coordinates: 41.519°N 1.576°E
- Country: Spain
- Community: Catalonia
- Province: Barcelona
- Comarca: Anoia

Government
  - Mayor: Imma Palet Rubió (2015)

Area
  - Total: 15.2 km^{2} (5.9 sq mi)

Population (2025-01-01)
  - Total: 175
  - Density: 11.5/km^{2} (29.8/sq mi)
- Website: orpi.cat

Orpí (Catalan pronunciation: [uɾˈpi]) is a municipality in the comarca of the Anoia in Catalonia, Spain.
