= Montserrat Vayreda =

Catalan poet

Montserrat Vayreda i Trullol (1924-2006) was a Catalan poet.

== Biography ==
Vayreda was from Figueres in Girona.

Descended from a family of Catalan artists, she was granddaughter of a recognised botanic, Estanislau Vayreda. Influenced by maternal grandfather, a poet Sebastià Trullol, she tried her hand in poetry herself. Following her literary debut in 1955 she was gaining recognition, publishing also in local periodicals and active in various Catalan cultural initiatives. In 1999 she received Creu de Sant Jordi.

Vayreda was associated with the Catalan poet Sun Estarriol and gave her advice on early poetry.

== Works ==
- Entre el temps i l'eternitat (1955)
- Ofrena de Nadal (1965)
- Un color per cada amic (1977)
- Afirmo l'esperança (1980)
- Joan Sibecas (1979)
- Joaquim Vayreda (1982),
- Els pobles de l'Alt Empordà (1984–89)
- L'Empordà màgic (l'Alt Empordà) (1987)
- La màgia del Baix Empordà (1991)
