= Montmaneu =

- Municipality
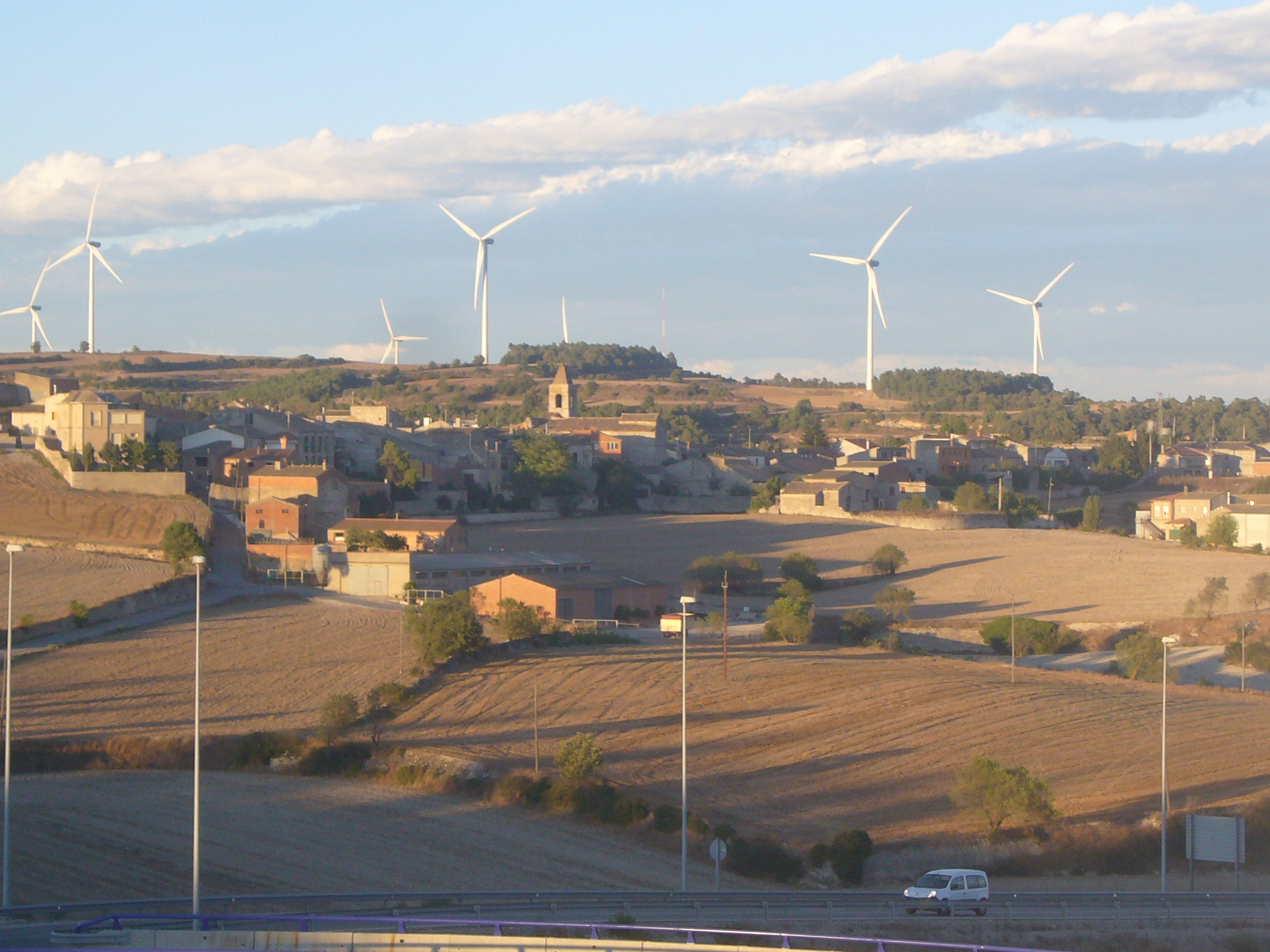
- Montmaneu

- Coat of arms

- Location in Catalonia Montmaneu (Spain)
- Coordinates: 41°37′38″N 1°25′2″E
- Country: Spain
- Community: Catalonia
- Province: Barcelona
- Comarca: Anoia

Government
  - Mayor: Àngel Farré Carulla (2015)

Area
  - Total: 13.6 km^{2} (5.3 sq mi)

Population (2025-01-01)
  - Total: 181
  - Density: 13.3/km^{2} (34.5/sq mi)
- Website: www.montmaneu.cat

Montmaneu (Catalan pronunciation: [mumːəˈnɛw]) is a municipality in the comarca of the Anoia in Catalonia, Spain.
