= Copons =

- Municipality
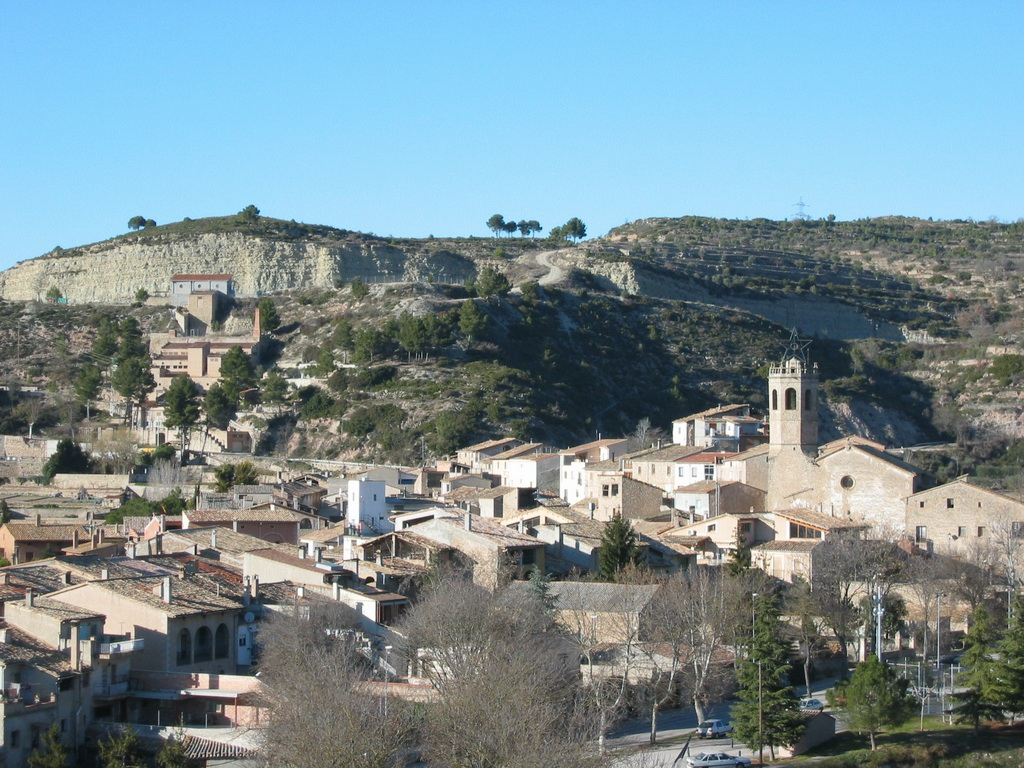
- Copons

- Coat of arms

- Location in Catalonia Copons (Spain)
- Coordinates: 41°38′18″N 1°31′10″E
- Country: Spain
- Community: Catalonia
- Province: Barcelona
- Comarca: Anoia

Government
  - Mayor: Francesc Salamé Sabater (2015)

Area
  - Total: 18.7 km^{2} (7.2 sq mi)

Population (2025-01-01)
  - Total: 352
  - Density: 18.8/km^{2} (48.8/sq mi)
- Website: copons.cat

Copons (Catalan pronunciation: [kuˈpons]) is a municipality in the comarca of the Anoia in Catalonia, Spain.

== Transportation ==
Copons can be accessed from C142a not far from A2 linking Lleida with Barcelona.
