= La Pobla de Claramunt =

- Municipality
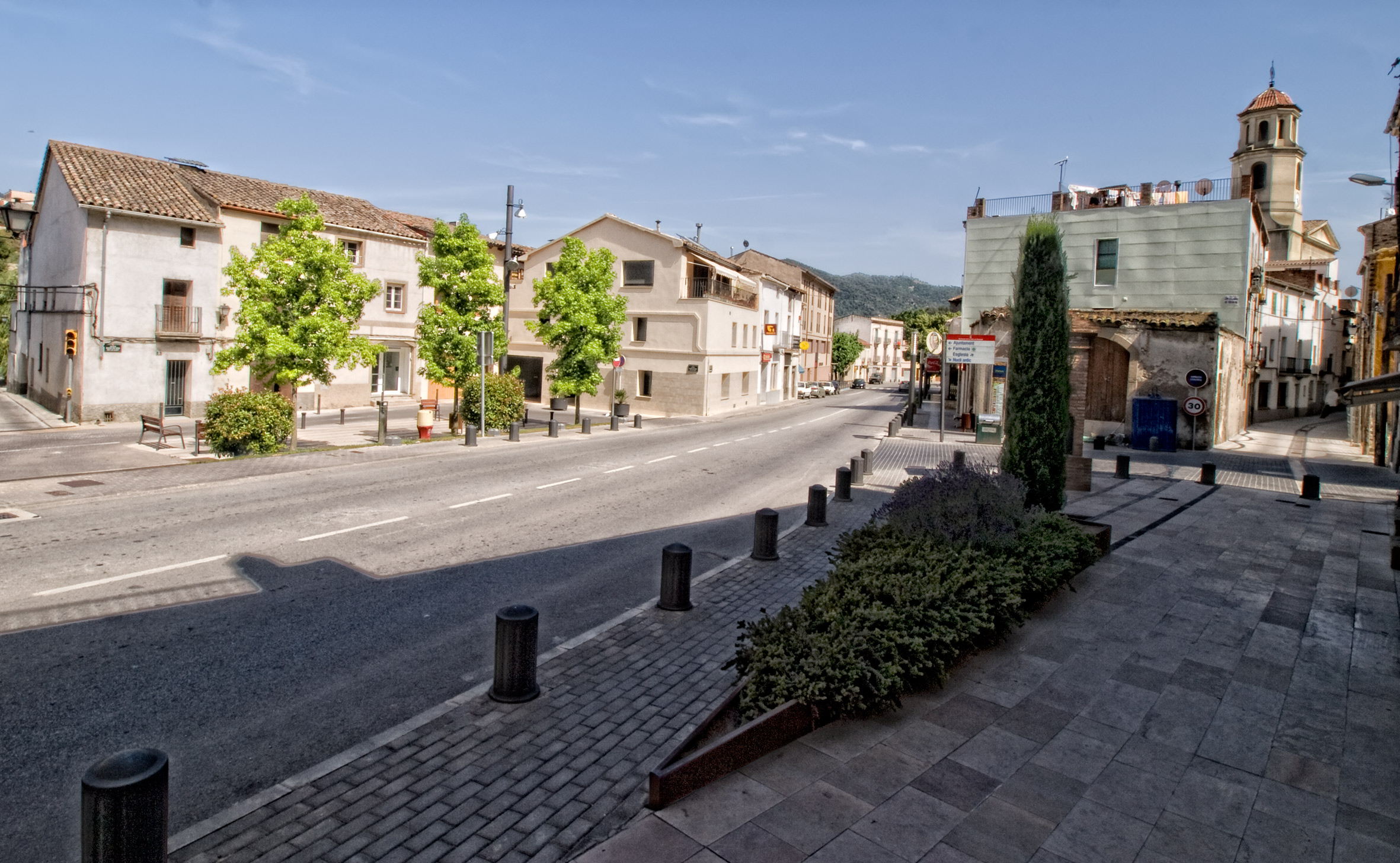
- Avinguda Catalunya

- Flag Coat of arms

- Location in Catalonia La Pobla de Claramunt (Spain)
- Coordinates: 41°33′16″N 1°40′47″E
- Country: Spain
- Community: Catalonia
- Province: Barcelona
- Comarca: Anoia

Government
  - Mayor: Santiago Broch Miquel (2015)

Area
  - Total: 18.5 km^{2} (7.1 sq mi)
- Elevation: 246 m (807 ft)

Population (2025-01-01)
  - Total: 2,350
  - Density: 127/km^{2} (329/sq mi)
- Demonym(s): Pobletà, pobletana
- Website: www.lapobladeclaramunt.cat

La Pobla de Claramunt (Catalan pronunciation: [lə ˈpob.blə ðə kləɾəˈmun]) is a municipality in the comarca of the Anoia in Catalonia, Spain. It is situated on the edge of the Òdena Basin at the entrance to the Capellades Gorge. The town is dominated by Claramunt castle, on a hilltop some 150 m above the modern settlement: the castle was, with Castellbell castle, one of the main points of control of access to the Llobregat valley and hence to Barcelona. With neighbouring Capellades, La Pobla de Claramunt is an important centre for paper manufacture. It is served by a station on the FGC railway line R6 from Barcelona and Martorell to Igualada and by the C-244 road from Igualada to Vilafranca del Penedès.

== Demography ==
1900	1930	1950	1970	1986	2007
1074	1121	1049	1518	1685	2193

== Subdivisions ==
Five outlying villages are included in the municipality of La Pobla de Claramunt (Populations as of 2005):

- Els Vivencs (45)
- Barri de l'Estació (629)
- Les Garrigues (116)
- Els Masets (4)
- La Rata (50)
- El Xaró (155)
- Les Cases Noves
- Les Figueres

== Transportation ==
Train line connecting Igualada with Barcelona has a stop for boarding on both ways of the line.
