= Sant Martí Sesgueioles =

- Municipality
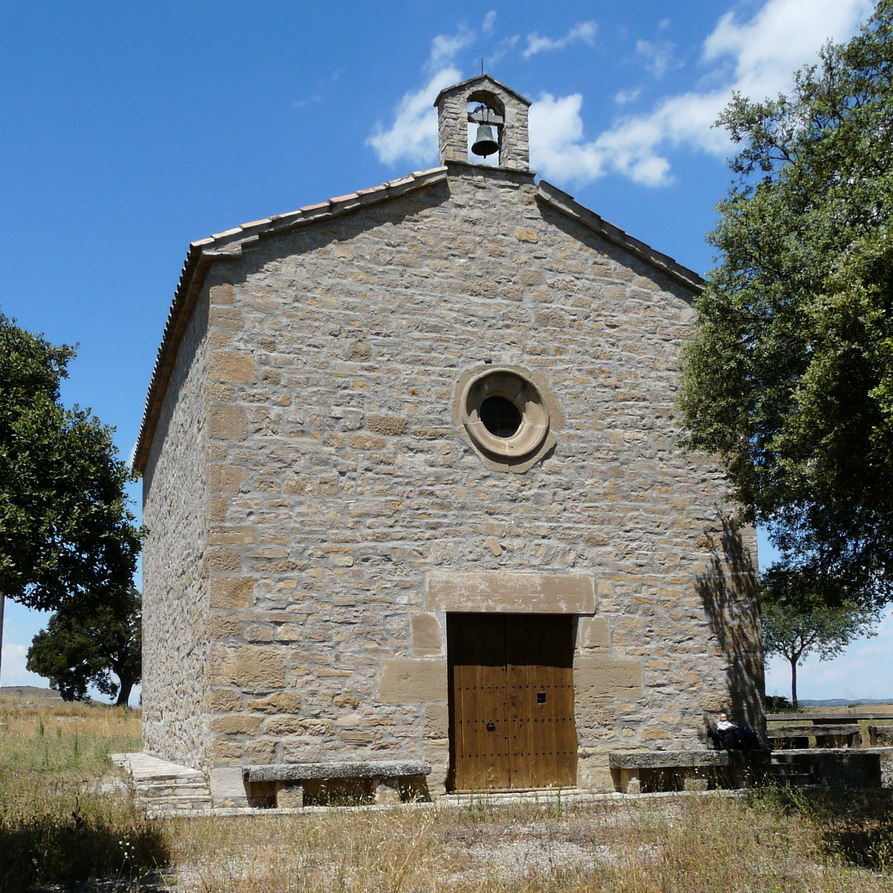
- Church of St. Valentine, Vilallonga (1669)

- Flag Coat of arms

- Location in Catalonia Sant Martí Sesgueioles (Spain)
- Coordinates: 41°42′11″N 1°29′25″E
- Country: Spain
- Community: Catalonia
- Province: Barcelona
- Comarca: Anoia

Government
  - Mayor: Jesús Torrens Garriga (2015)

Area
  - Total: 3.9 km^{2} (1.5 sq mi)

Population (2025-01-01)
  - Total: 353
  - Density: 91/km^{2} (230/sq mi)
- Website: www.sesgueioles.cat

Sant Martí Sesgueioles (Catalan pronunciation: [ˈsam məɾˈti səzɣəˈjɔləs]; Old Catalan for 'St. Martin [of] the Little Churches') is a municipality in the comarca of the Anoia in Catalonia, Spain.
