= Jorba =

- Municipality
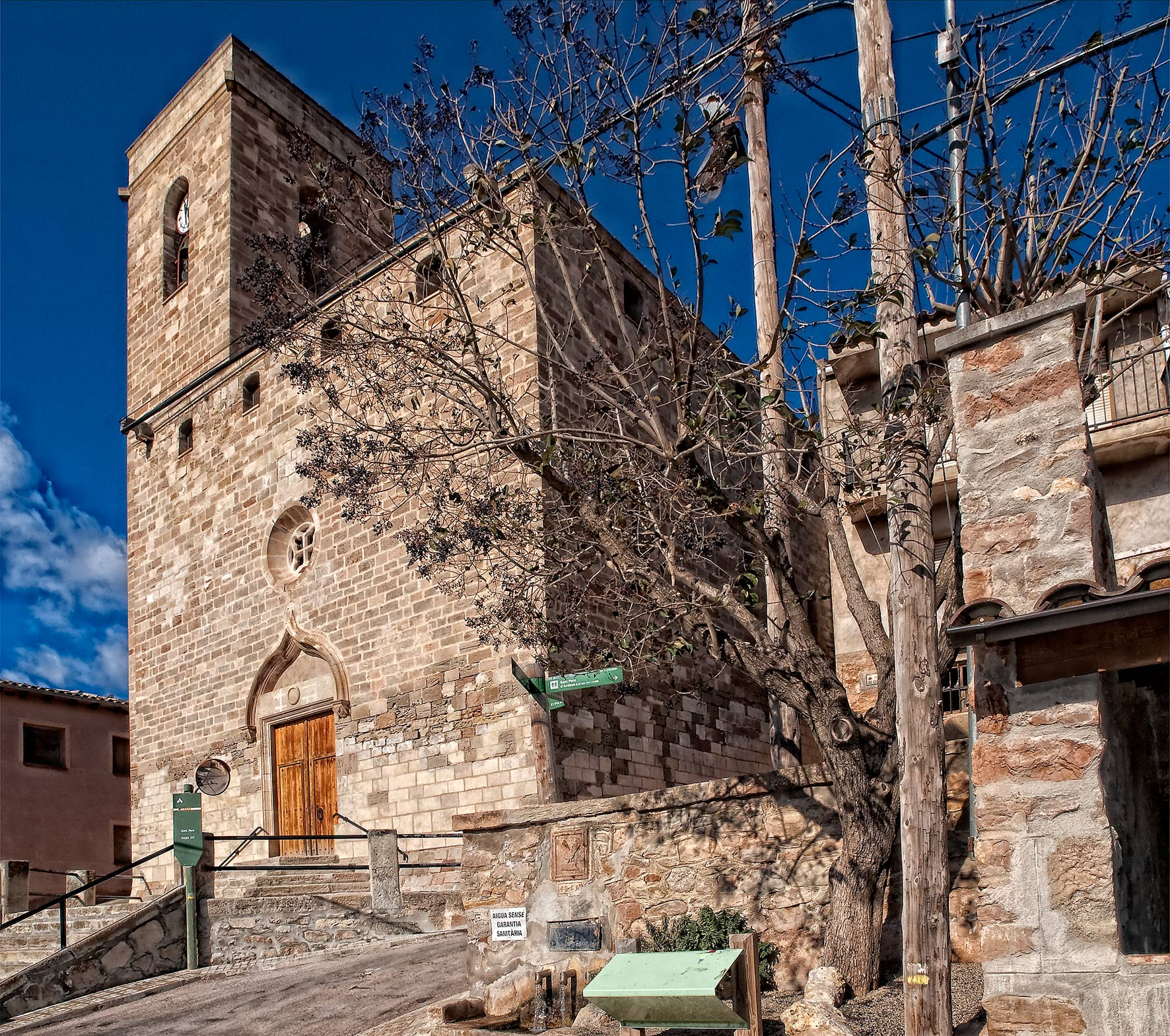
- St. Peter's church

- Flag Coat of arms

- Location in Catalonia Jorba (Spain)
- Coordinates: 41°36′13″N 1°32′56″E
- Country: Spain
- Community: Catalonia
- Province: Barcelona
- Comarca: Anoia

Government
  - Mayor: David Sànchez Garcia (2015)

Area
  - Total: 30.9 km^{2} (11.9 sq mi)
- Elevation: 380 m (1,250 ft)

Population (2025-01-01)
  - Total: 850
  - Density: 28/km^{2} (71/sq mi)
- Website: www.jorba.cat

Jorba (Catalan pronunciation: [ˈʒoɾβə]) is a municipality in the comarca of the Anoia in Catalonia, Spain.
