= Anoia =

Coordinates: 41°36′47″N 1°36′21″E

- Comarca
- Flag Coat of arms Logo

- Country: Spain
- Autonomous community: Catalonia
- Regions: Penedès; Central Catalonia
- Province: Barcelona
- Capital: Igualada
- Municipalities: List: Argençola, Bellprat, El Bruc, Cabrera d'Igualada, Calaf, Calonge de Segarra, Capellades, Carme, Castellfollit de Riubregós, Castellolí, Copons, Els Hostalets de Pierola, Igualada, Jorba, La Llacuna, Masquefa, Montmaneu, Òdena, Orpí, Piera, La Pobla de Claramunt, Els Prats de Rei, Pujalt, Rubió, Sant Martí Sesgueioles, Sant Martí de Tous, Sant Pere Sallavinera, Santa Margarida de Montbui, Santa Maria de Miralles, La Torre de Claramunt, Vallbona d'Anoia, Veciana, Vilanova del Camí

Government
  - Body: Anoia Comarcal Council
  - President: Jordi Parcerisas (Junts)

Area
  - Total: 866.3 km^{2} (334.5 sq mi)

Population (2014)
  - Total: 117,842
  - Density: 136.0/km^{2} (352.3/sq mi)
- Demonyms: Anoienc, anoienca
- Time zone: UTC+1 (CET)
  - Summer (DST): UTC+2 (CEST)
- Largest municipality: Igualada

Anoia (Catalan pronunciation: [əˈnɔjə]) is a comarca (county) in central Catalonia, Spain, with its capital at Igualada. It is mainly located in the Penedès region, with its northern section being in Central Catalonia.

The comarca of Anoia is irrigated by the Anoia River; the leading industry is the making of paper.

To the north are Solsonès and Bages, to the west, Baix Llobregat to the south Baix Penedès and Alt Camp, and to the east Conca de Barberà and Segarra.

== Municipalities ==
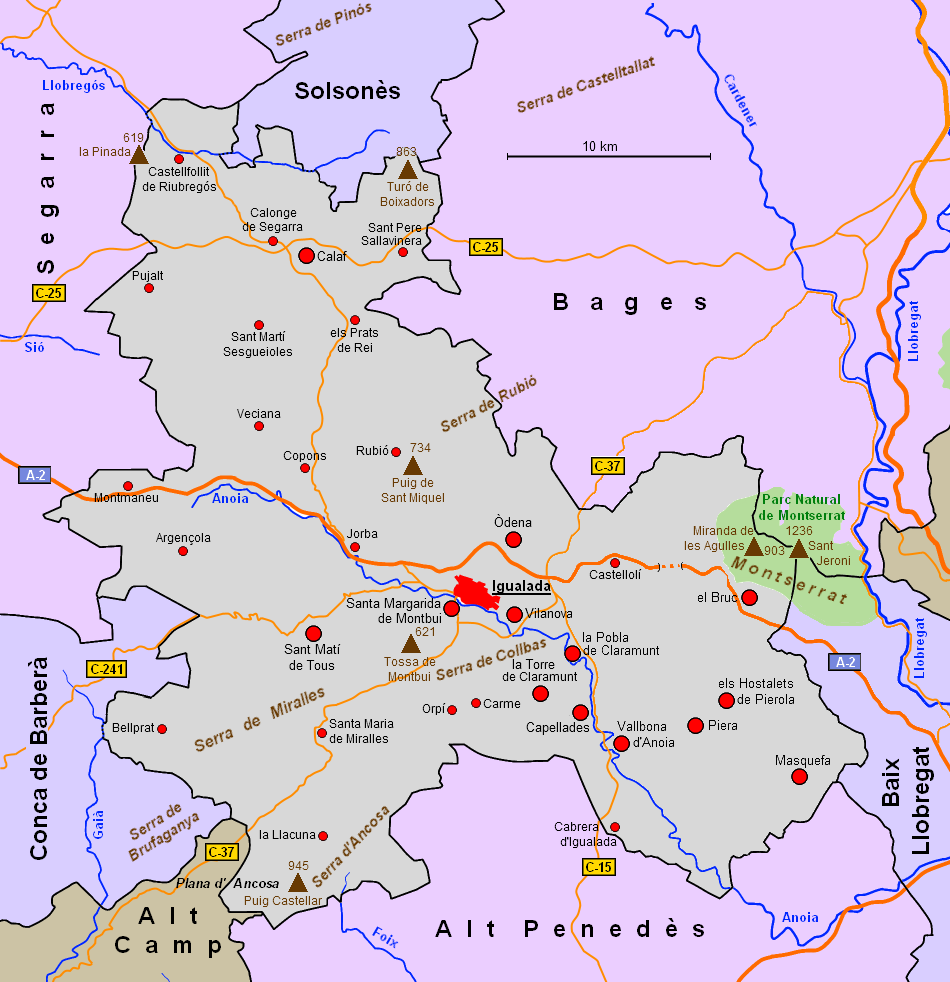
Map of Anoia

Municipality	Population (2014)	Area km^{2}
Argençola	212	47.1
Bellprat	78	31.0
El Bruc	1,991	47.2
Cabrera d'Anoia	1,363	17.0
Calaf	3,475	9.2
Calonge de Segarra	202	37.2
Capellades	5,284	2.9
Carme	817	11.7
Castellfollit de Riubregós	177	26.2
Castellolí	571	25.3
Copons	323	18.7
Els Hostalets de Pierola	2,942	33.5
Igualada	38,751	8.1
Jorba	838	30.9
La Llacuna	906	52.2
Masquefa	8,406	17.1
Montmaneu	164	13.6
Òdena	3,624	52.7
Orpí	131	15.2
Piera	15,000	57.2
La Pobla de Claramunt	2,186	18.5
Els Prats de Rei	537	26.1
Pujalt	198	31.4
Rubió	228	48.0
Sant Martí de Tous	1,175	39.2
Sant Martí Sesgueioles	395	3.9
Sant Pere Sallavinera	162	22.0
Santa Margarida de Montbui	9,641	27.6
Santa Maria de Miralles	140	25.0
La Torre de Claramunt	3,819	15.0
Vallbona d'Anoia	1,424	6.4
Veciana	176	38.9
Vilanova del Camí	12,506	10.3
• Total: 33	117,842	866.3
