= Castellfollit de Riubregós =

- Municipality
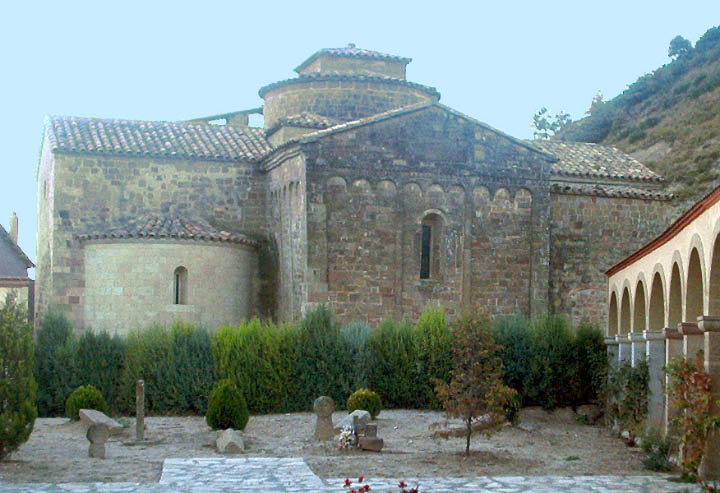
- Santa Maria del Priorat

- Coat of arms

- Location in Catalonia Castellfollit de Riubregós (Spain)
- Coordinates: 41°46′40″N 1°26′22″E
- Country: Spain
- Community: Catalonia
- Province: Barcelona
- Comarca: Anoia

Government
  - Mayor: Jordi Cases Camats

Area
  - Total: 26.2 km^{2} (10.1 sq mi)

Population (2025-01-01)
  - Total: 153
  - Density: 5.84/km^{2} (15.1/sq mi)
- Website: www.riubregos.cat

Castellfollit de Riubregós (Catalan pronunciation: [kəsˌteʎfuˈʎid də riwβɾəˈɣos]) is a municipality in the comarca of the Anoia in Catalonia, Spain.
