= Capellades =

- Municipality
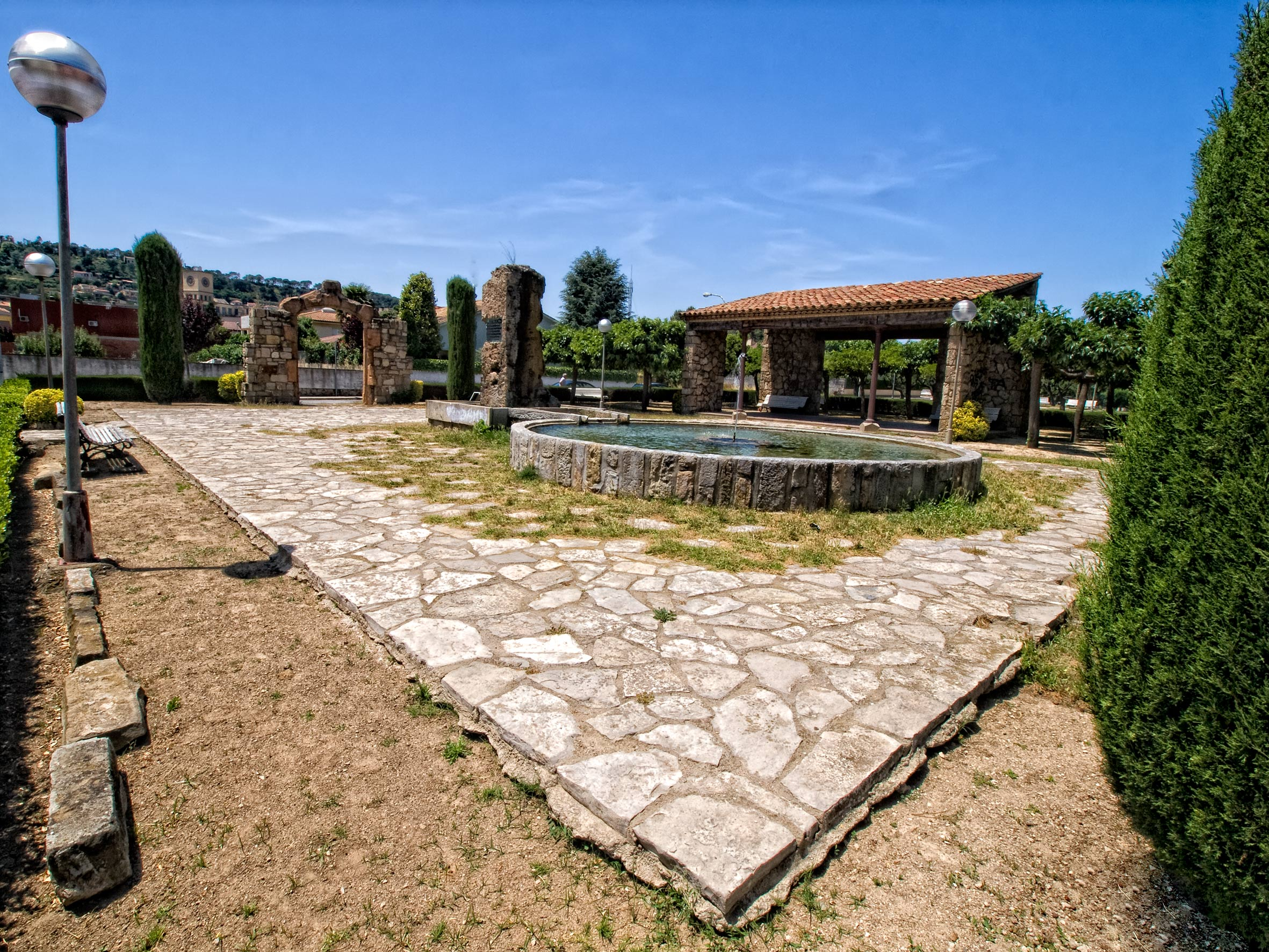
- Capelló gardens

- Coat of arms

- Location in Catalonia Capellades (Spain)
- Coordinates: 41°31′55″N 1°41′12″E
- Country: Spain
- Autonomous community: Catalonia
- Province: Barcelona
- Comarca: Anoia

Government
  - mayor: Aleix Auber Alvarez (2015)

Area
  - Total: 2.9 km^{2} (1.1 sq mi)
- Elevation: 317 m (1,040 ft)

Population (2025-01-01)
  - Total: 5,608
  - Density: 1,900/km^{2} (5,000/sq mi)
- Demonym(s): Capelladí; Capelladina
- Time zone: UTC+1 (CET)
  - Summer (DST): UTC+2 (CEST)
- Postal code: 08786
- Website: www.capellades.cat

Capellades (Catalan pronunciation: [kəpəˈʎaðəs]) is a town in Catalonia, Spain, located in the south of the comarca of Anoia, some sixty metres above the Anoia river where it cuts through the Catalan Coastal Range. The C-15 trunk road from Vilafranca del Penedès and the FGC railway line R6 from Martorell and Barcelona run along the river valley below the town on their way to Igualada. It is about one hour from Barcelona by car, bus or train.

Capellades is known for the manufacture of paper since the seventeenth century. A paper manufacturer in Capellades (established in 1714) specialised today in producing security paper is the oldest company in Spain. In the town there is also a Museum of Paper (Molí-Museu Paperer) housed in a converted papermill.

There is a small amount of agriculture, both irrigated (market gardening) and non-irrigated (cereals, grapes, almonds), although the territory of the municipality is small. Textile and ceramic manufacture and tourism during the summer also contribute to the local economy. Munich (sport shoes) has its headquarters in Capellades.

The site has been inhabited since the Middle Paleolithic era (50000 years BP), and an archeological site just below the modern town, known locally as the Abric Romaní, is open to the public.

== Demography ==
1900	1930	1950	1970	1986	2005
2629	2275	2306	3910	4917	5302

== Transportation ==
Train line connecting Igualada with Barcelona has a stop for boarding on both ways of the line.
