= Martorell =

- Municipality
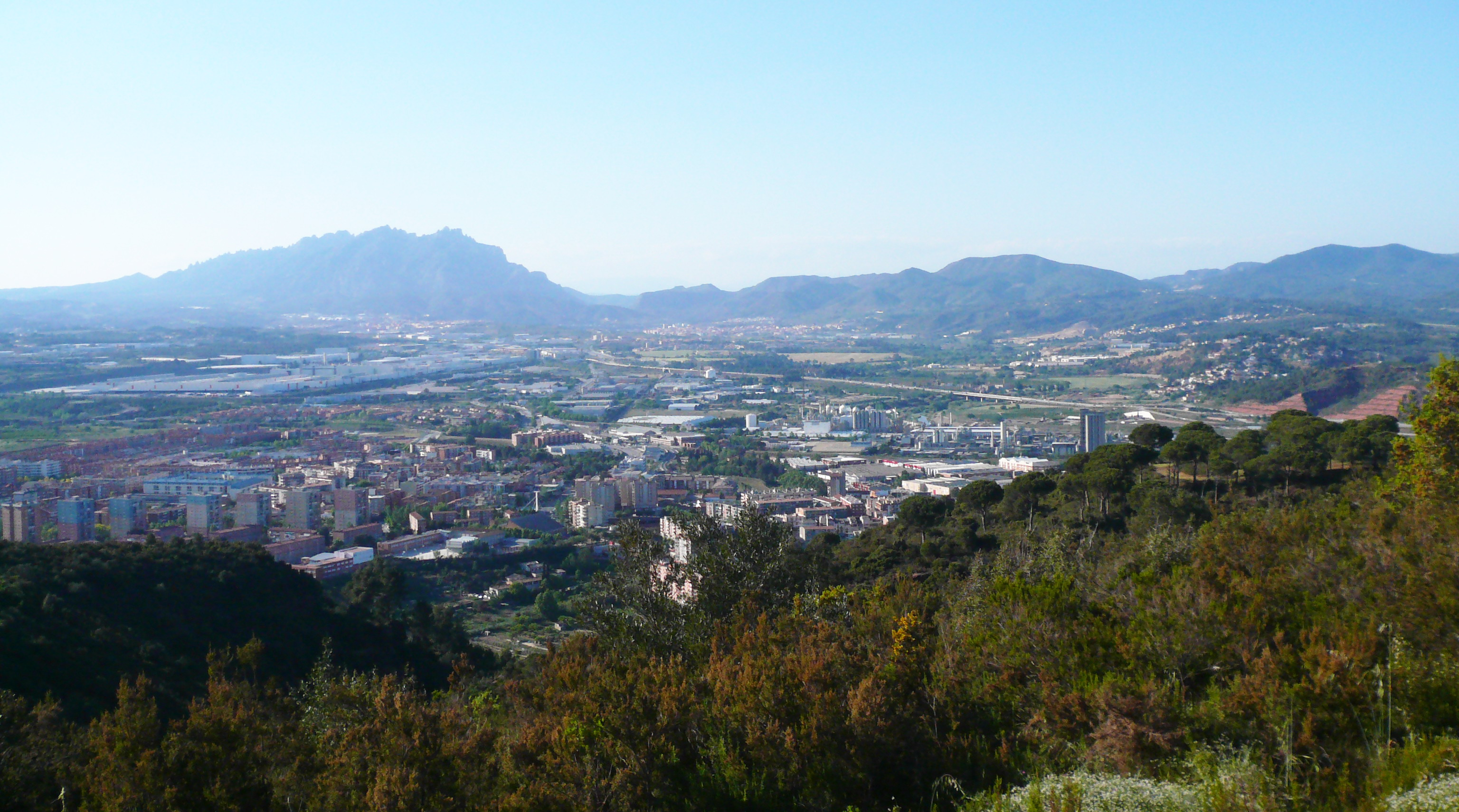

- Flag Coat of arms

- Location in Catalonia Martorell (Spain)
- Coordinates: 41.477°N 1.928°E
- Country: Spain
- Community: Catalonia
- Province: Barcelona
- Comarca: Baix Llobregat

Government
  - Mayor: Xavier Fonollosa (Junts per Martorell)

Area
  - Total: 12.8 km^{2} (4.9 sq mi)
- Elevation: 56 m (184 ft)

Population (2025-01-01)
  - Total: 29,175
  - Density: 2,280/km^{2} (5,900/sq mi)
- Website: martorell.cat

Martorell (Catalan pronunciation: [məɾtuˈɾeʎ]) is a municipality, county, and city that forms part of the Baix Llobregat comarca, in Catalonia, Spain, primarily known for its medieval Devil's bridge. It lies at the confluence of the Llobregat and Anoia rivers.

It has three railway stations - one on the Renfe line from Manresa to Sant Vicenç de Calders (via Barcelona and Vilafranca del Penedès) called "Martorell", and three on the FGC line from Barcelona to Manresa called "Martorell-Vila", "Martorell-Enllaç" and "Martorell-Central".

Martorell is home to the SEAT corporate headquarters and automobile factory, where the SEAT Ibiza, Leon, Arona and (formerly) Audi A1 are manufactured.

== History ==
Archaeological findings indicate human presence in the Llobregat Valley dating back to the Neolithic period, as well as the existence of Iberian settlements. The area also saw the presence of Carthaginian settlements, who were the first to build a bridge over the Llobregat River. The Romans occupied the territory as early as the 2nd century BC, and Martorell later became a key point along the Via Augusta, which crossed the river via the so-called Pont del Diable, a Roman bridge with a triumphal arch than still stands today (Ad Fines). Roman rule was followed by Visigothic domination from the 4th century onward, as evidenced by the remains of a paleochristian church and a necropolis in Santa Margarida, which confirm the spread of Christianity in the 5th century.

Sparsely inhabited for centuries, the area saw significant population growth in the late 9th century, and by 878, a settlement had been established on the right bank of the Llobregat. The first recorded mention of Martorell dates back to 1032, when the region was under the rule of the Castelvell family before passing to the Moncada lineage. In 1344, Roger Bernard III of Foix granted Martorell the status of a municipality. In the early 15th century, the town suffered the consequences of the succession struggles between the House of Foix and King Martin I of Aragon.

During the Guerra dels Segadors, Martorell became the headquarters of the troops defending Barcelona. In 1641, the town was besieged and destroyed by the forces of the Marquis de los Vélez. After being rebuilt, it was devastated once again in 1652 by a severe plague epidemic that swept through much of Europe. In 1714, the Castle of Rosades was occupied, and its Torre de l'Homenatge was blown up. The early 19th century brought further turmoil with the war against the French, during which Napoleon's troops plundered the town. The following decades were marked by Spain's political instability, which saw three civil wars, seven different constitutions, seven monarchs, a change of dynasty, multiple military coups, and a short-lived republic lasting just one year—all of which had a lasting impact on Martorell.

== Demography ==
1900	1930	1950	1970	1986	2002	2013
3221	4972	5887	13,086	16,170	24,549	28,108

== Climate ==
Climate data for Martorell (data from 1964-1970)
Month	Jan	Feb	Mar	Apr	May	Jun	Jul	Aug	Sep	Oct	Nov	Dec	Year
Mean daily maximum °C (°F)	11.6 (52.9)	12.8 (55.0)	16.3 (61.3)	20.7 (69.3)	25.8 (78.4)	29.5 (85.1)	33.0 (91.4)	31.3 (88.3)	26.3 (79.3)	21.2 (70.2)	15.0 (59.0)	10.8 (51.4)	21.2 (70.2)
Daily mean °C (°F)	6.8 (44.2)	7.6 (45.7)	10.4 (50.7)	14.1 (57.4)	18.4 (65.1)	21.9 (71.4)	25.4 (77.7)	24.8 (76.6)	20.8 (69.4)	16.2 (61.2)	10.2 (50.4)	6.6 (43.9)	15.3 (59.5)
Mean daily minimum °C (°F)	2.1 (35.8)	2.4 (36.3)	4.6 (40.3)	7.5 (45.5)	11.1 (52.0)	14.3 (57.7)	17.9 (64.2)	18.4 (65.1)	15.4 (59.7)	11.1 (52.0)	5.5 (41.9)	2.5 (36.5)	9.4 (48.9)
Source: Sistema de Clasificación Bioclimática Mundial
