= Òdena =

- Municipality
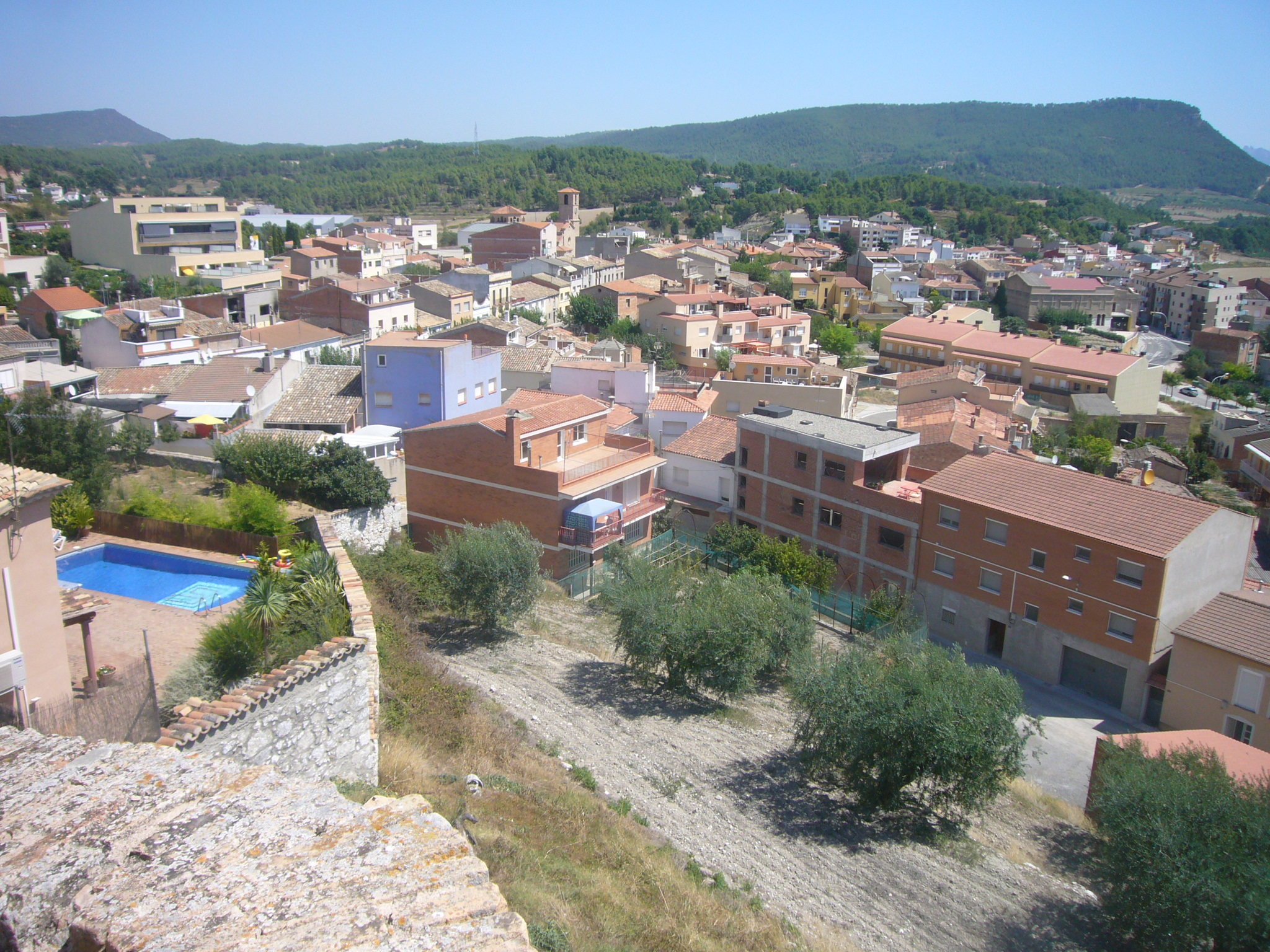
- Òdena, seen from its castle

- Flag Coat of arms

- Location in Catalonia Òdena (Spain)
- Coordinates: 41°36′29″N 1°38′31″E
- Country: Spain
- Community: Catalonia
- Province: Province of Barcelona
- Comarca: Anoia

Government
  - Mayor: Maria Sayavera Seuba (2019)

Area
  - Total: 52.7 km^{2} (20.3 sq mi)
- Elevation: 421 m (1,381 ft)

Population (2025-01-01)
  - Total: 3,760
  - Density: 71.3/km^{2} (185/sq mi)
- Demonym(s): Odenenc, odenenca
- Website: odena.cat

Òdena (Catalan pronunciation: [ˈɔðənə]) is a municipality in the comarca of the Anoia in Barcelona province, Catalonia, Spain. It is situated in the centre of the Òdena Basin, on the side of a small hill. The remains of Òdena castle with its octagonal tower are at the top of the hill. The town is served by the C-241 road from Igualada to Manresa, and the main N-II road from Barcelona to Lleida runs through the municipality.

The Igualada-Òdena Aerodrome is located at the south of the Òdena municipality. The airdrome is home to the Aerosport airshow that takes place every year in April or May. In 2009 it was officially elected by the Catalan government to be converted into a corporate usage airfield. The current 900 metre runway will be extended to 1500 metres and new hangars will be built for sportive and corporate aviation. Ultramagic, the world's second largest manufacturer of hot air balloons, has its headquarters at the Igualada-Òdena aerodrome.

== Demography ==
1900	1930	1950	1970	1986	2007
1239	1326	1327	2525	2581	3161

== Subdivisions ==
The municipality of Òdena comprises ten settlements (populations are as of 2005):

- El Bosc Gran (17)
- Can Sabater (24)
- Can Soler (27)
- Les Casetes d'en Mussons (70)
- L'Espelt (224), in the east of the municipality, with the remains of a Roman villa
- La Font d'en Masarnau (31)
- Òdena (nuclí urbà) (1320)
- El Pla (1099)
- El Raval d'Aguilera (61)
- Samuntà (63)
