= Igualada-Òdena Aerodrome =

Igualada-Òdena Aerodrome Aeródromo de Igualada-Ódena
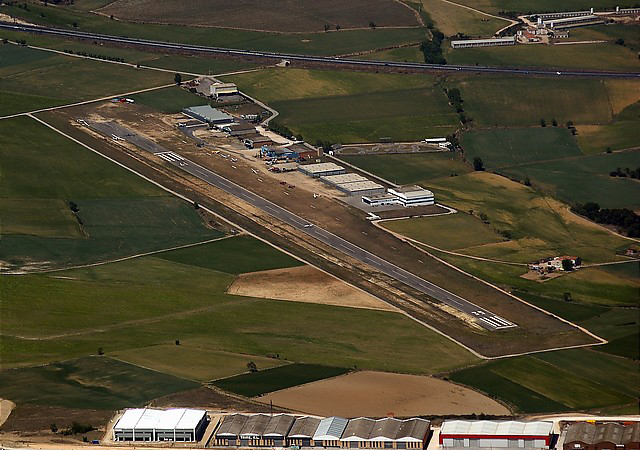
- IATA: none; ICAO: LEIG

Summary
- Airport type: Public
- Owner: Igualada-Òdena Aerodrome Consortium
- Operator: Igualada-Òdena Sailing Club
- Serves: Igualada
- Location: Òdena
- Elevation AMSL: 1,148 ft / 350 m
- Coordinates: 41°35′08″N 1°39′11″E

Map
- Location of airport in Catalonia

Runways
Direction	Length		Surface
Direction	ft	m	Surface
16/34	2,386	727	Asphalt

The Igualada-Òdena Aerodrome, known officially as the Igualada-Òdena General Vives Aerodrome, is an airfield located in the municipality of Òdena (Anoia). It has an asphalt runway 900 meters and 330 meters above sea level (1083 feet). The aerodrome is named after General Pere Vives Vich, a pioneer from Igualada in the field of aeronautics.

The airfield has a lot of sport aviation traffic, in which the Igualada-Òdena Sailing Club, the Airbet company, several schools and ultralight clubs operate, as well as a pilot school. It is the headquarters and factory of Ultramagic, a Catalan company that manufactures hot air balloons and is the only manufacturer of hot air balloons in Spain, and the second largest in the world.

The aerodrome is also the headquarters of the Aerosport air show, which has been held annually since 1993, organized by Fira d'Igualada. The show includes displays, demonstrations and flights of ultralight aircraft, autogyros, gliders, acrobatic aircraft, paramotors, helicopters, amateur aircraft, aeronautical accessories, flight training schools, clubs and a secondhand market.
