= European Balloon Festival =

Coordinates: 41.584543°N 1.630865°E

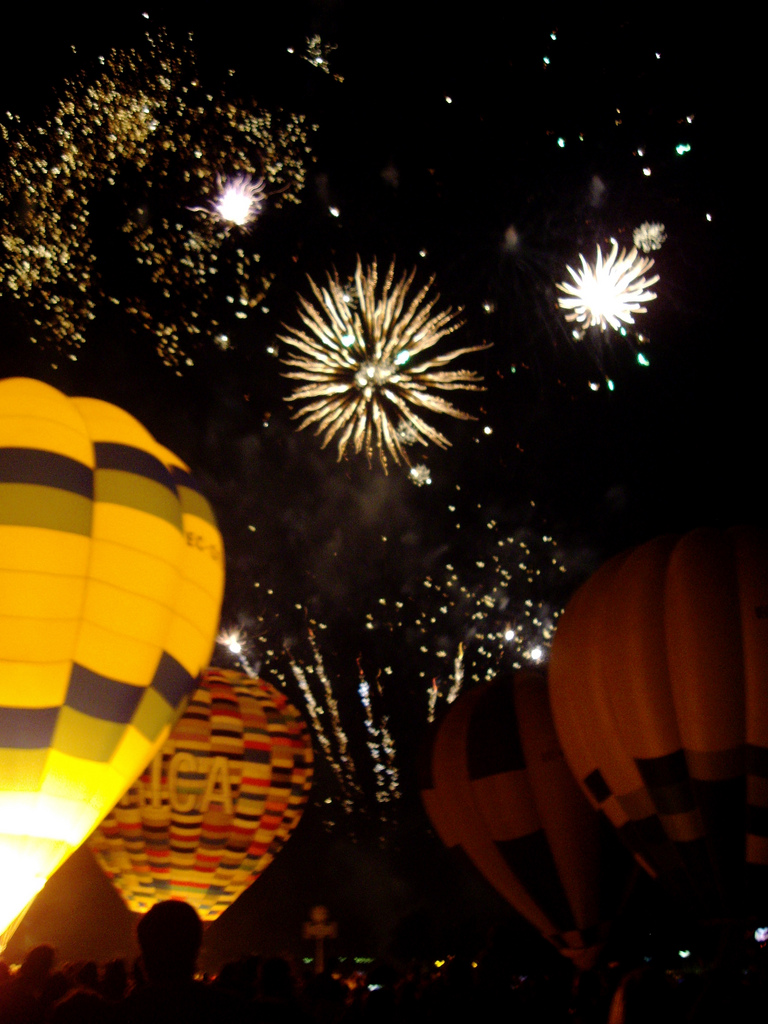
- European Balloon Festival, year 2008
- Genre: Hot air balloon festival
- Dates: Beginning of July
- Locations: Igualada, Spain
- Founded: 1997
- Attendance: 15,000
- Website: www.ebf.cat

The European Balloon Festival is the largest hot air balloon festival in Spain, and one of the largest in Europe. It takes place every year during the first fortnight of July in Igualada, Catalonia, Spain, a city located within 60 km from Barcelona.

The festival lasts four days (Thursday to Sunday) and attracts thousands of spectators. It includes a hot air balloon competition and recreational exhibitions such as a night glow and fireworks. The flights take place early in the morning and late in the afternoon, when weather conditions are the optimal ones. It also offers visitors the opportunity to fly on a balloon, by booking a flight in advance.

The festival is organized by the Igualada City Council, with technical support from the company Ultramagic, the world's second-largest manufacturer of hot air balloons, and Kon-Tiki Balloon Flights, a company specialized in balloon flights. The company merged with Royal Flight Tours in 2010, and operates flights from the south-eastern peninsula.

== History ==
The first festival was held in 1997, and since then has been organized every year. For some years it was held together with the Aerosport airshow, which in 2008 was moved to April or May of every year.

The 2007 edition gathered 60 hot air balloon pilots from multiple countries. The 2008 edition was a challenging one. Whilst the weather for the meeting was generally excellent, unusual rainy weather prior to the Festival meant that it had been impossible for the farmers to cut the crop fields. Landing conditions were therefore more difficult due to the lack of cut fields. The 2010 edition gathered 15,000 visitors.

There was no festival in 2020.

== Gallery of Images ==
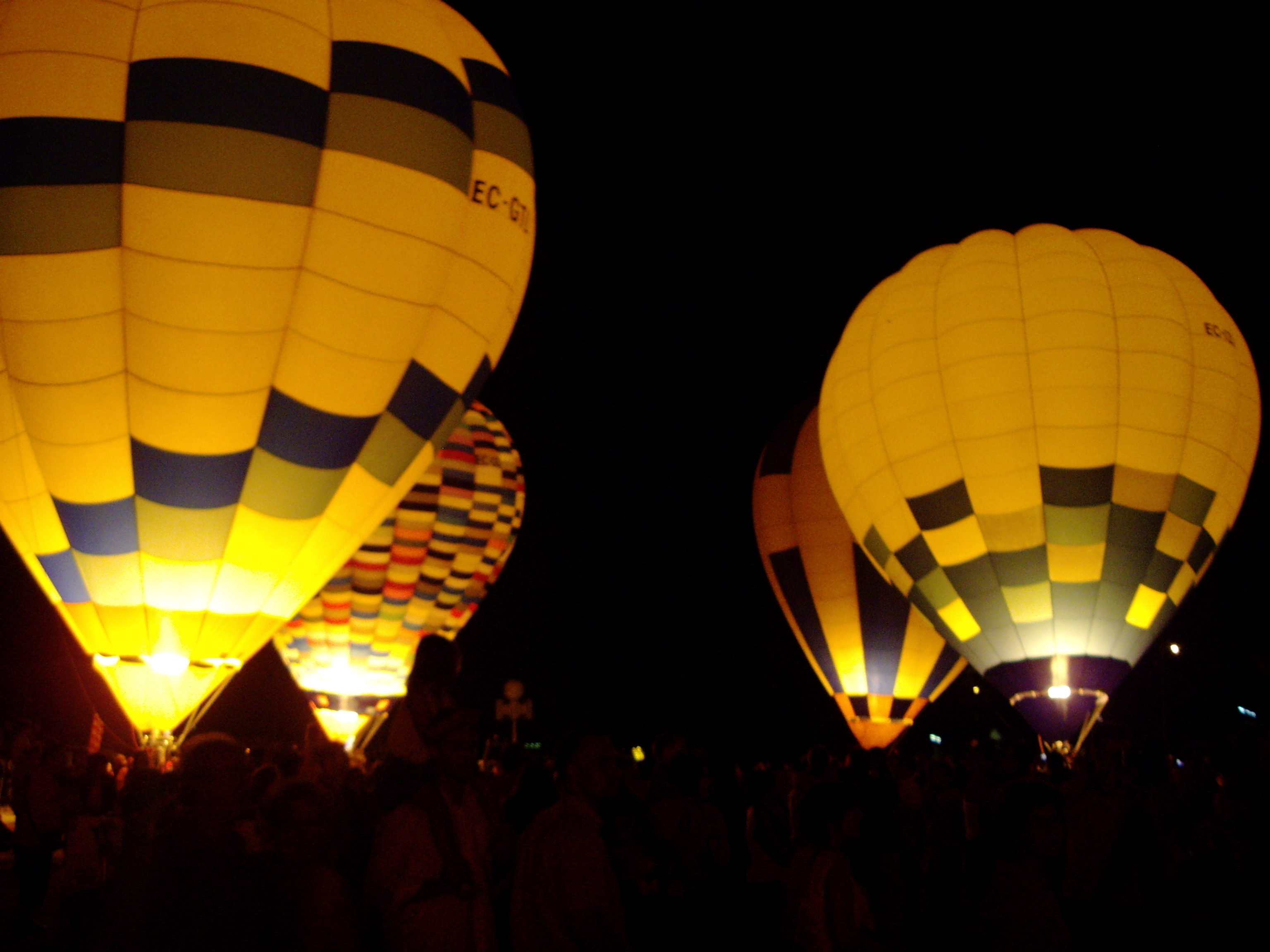
Night glow, 2008.

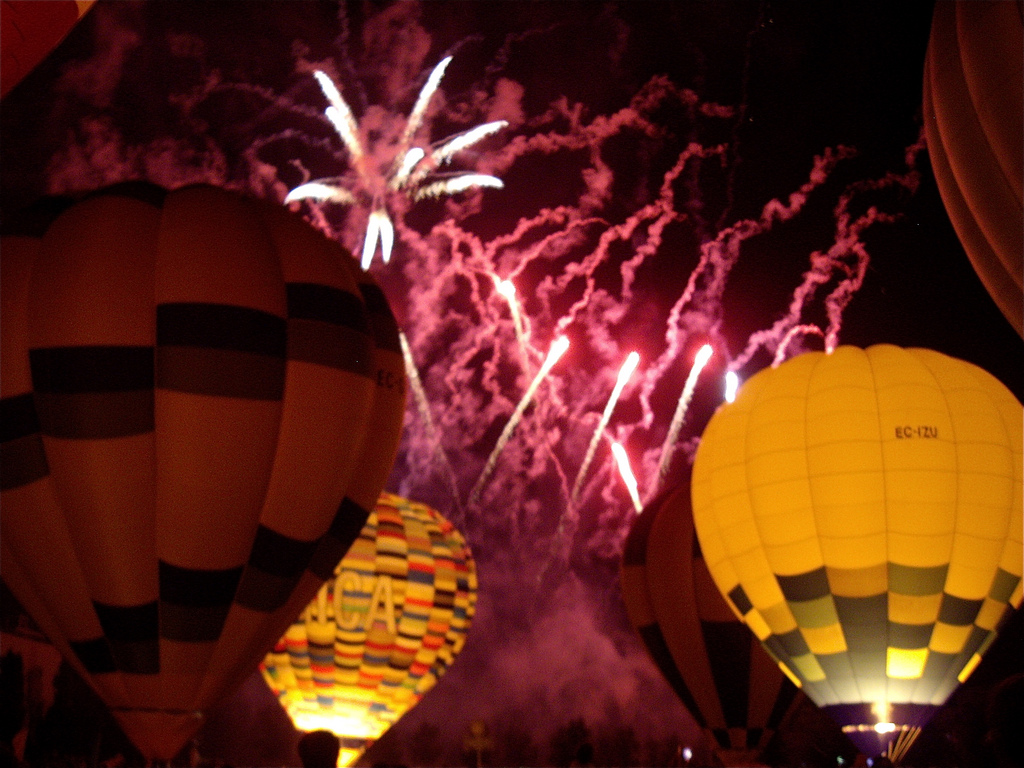
Night glow and fireworks, 2008.

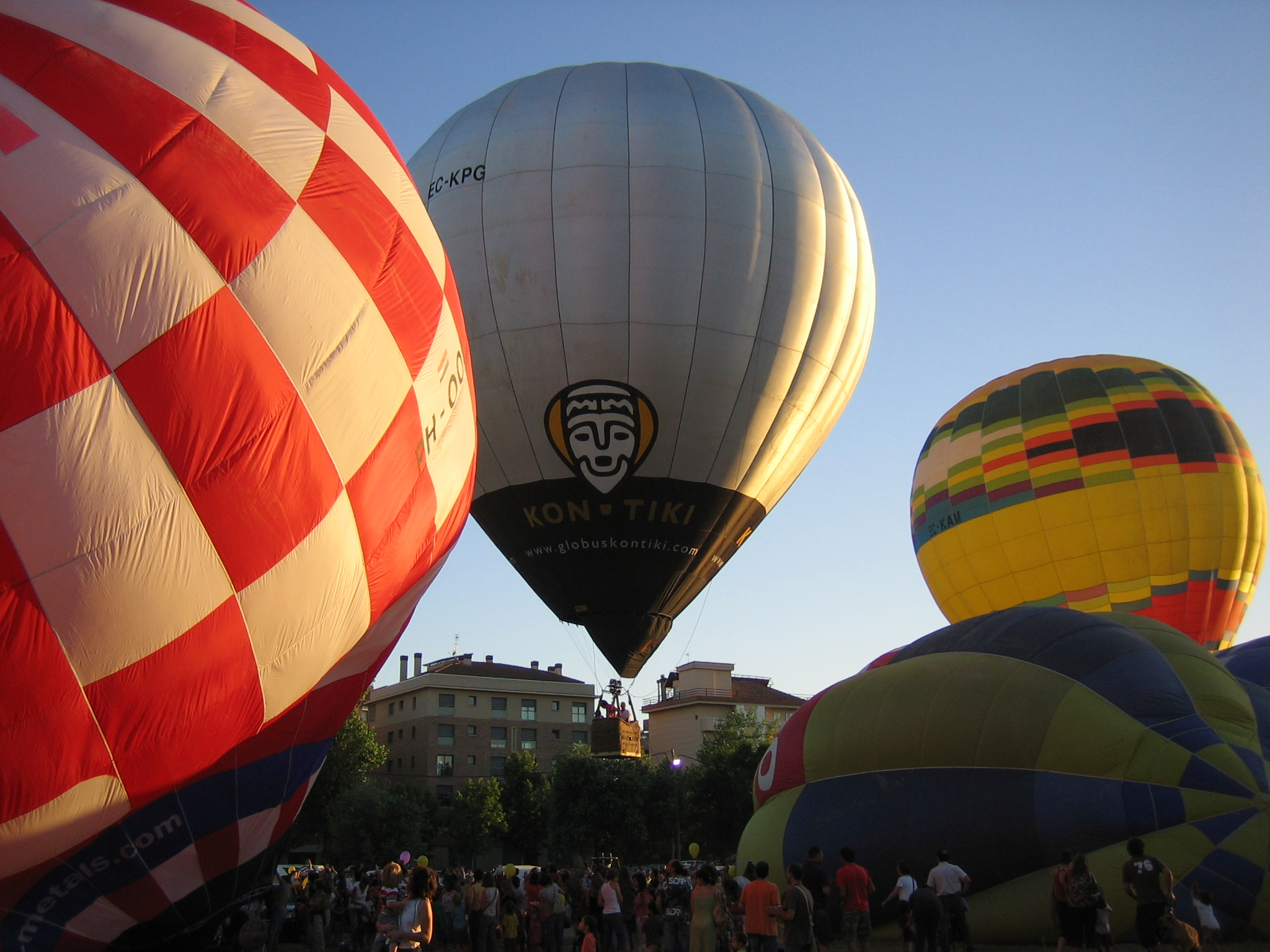
Inflating, year 2008.

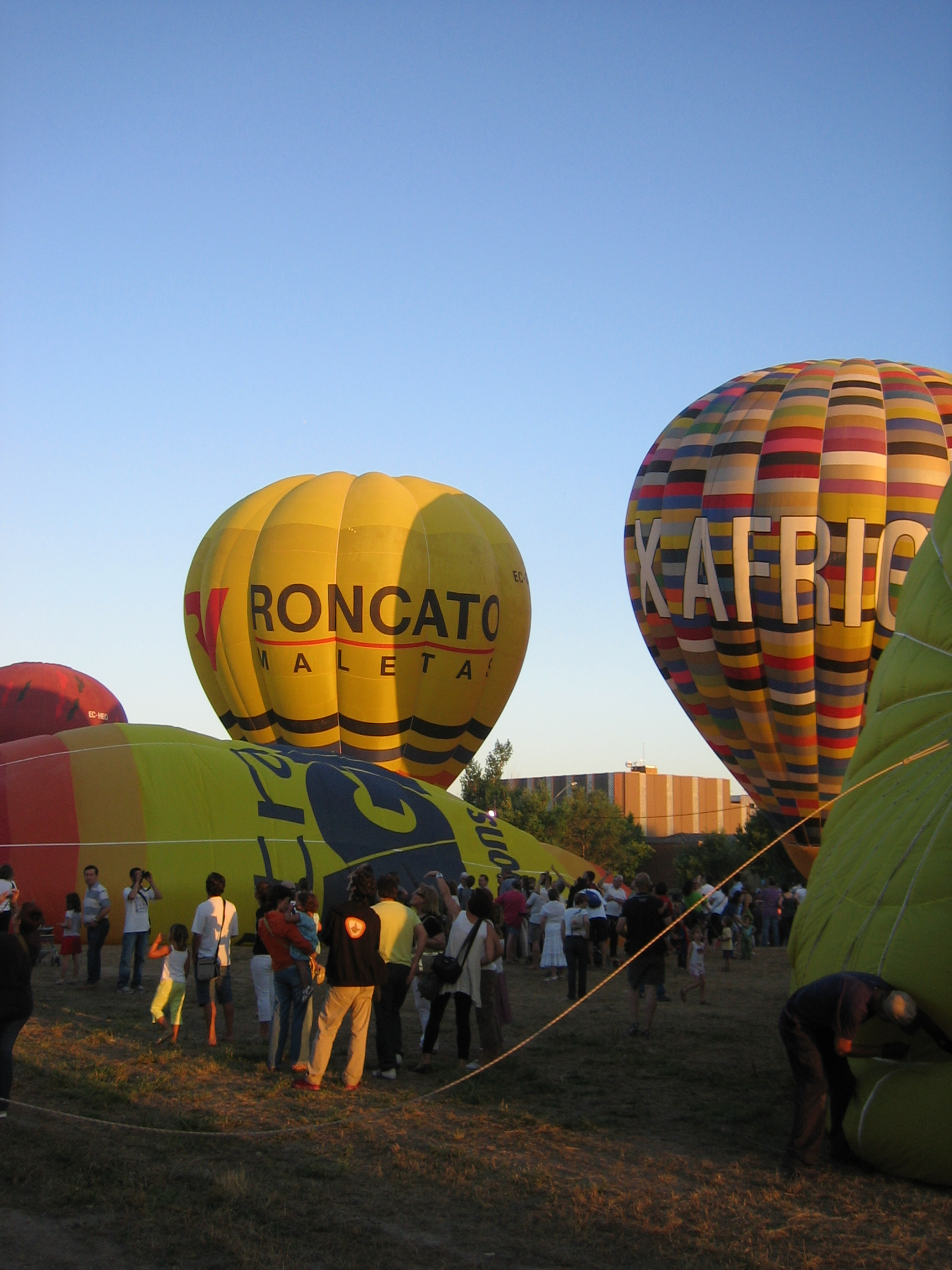
Year 2008.

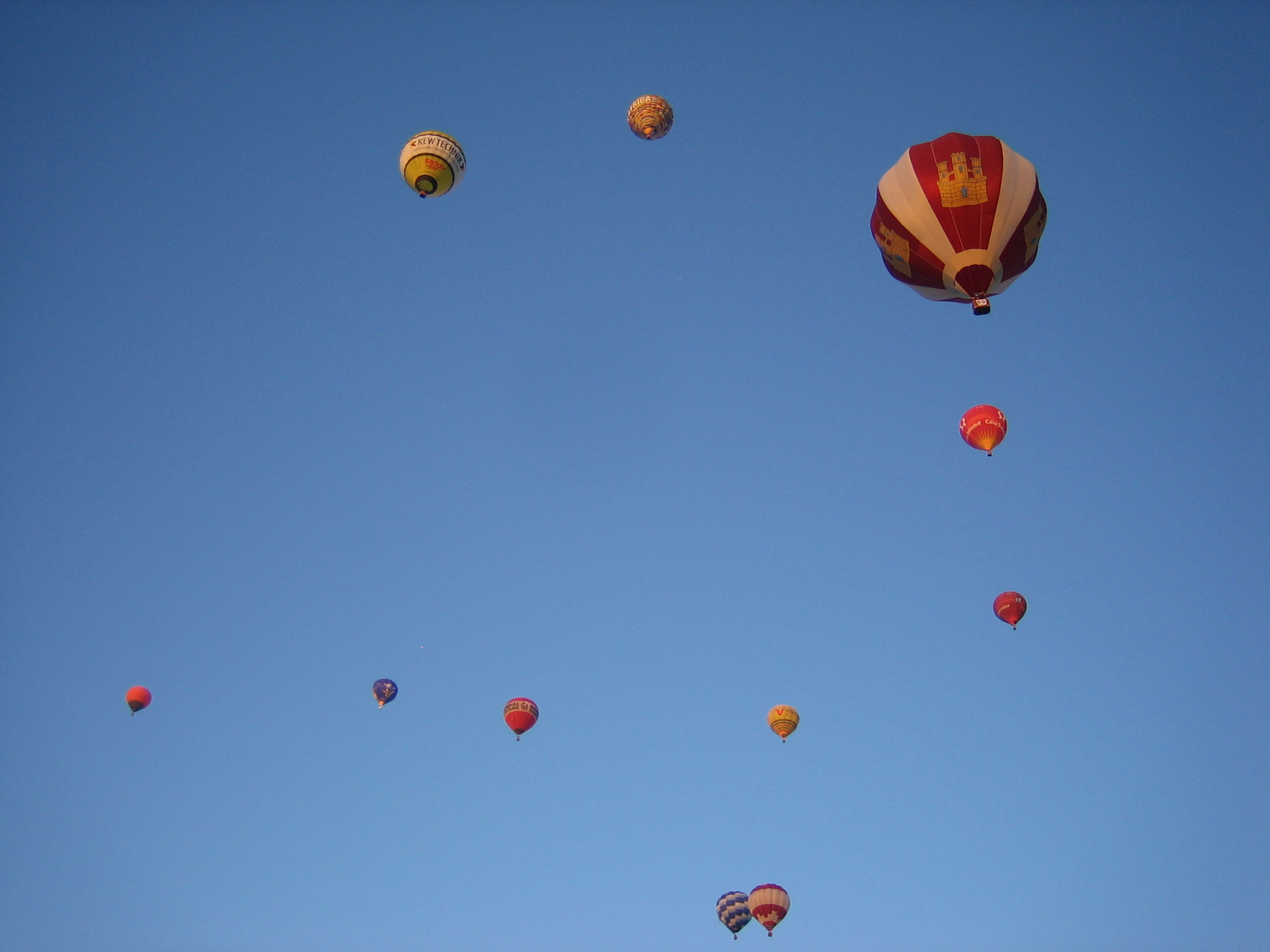
Year 2008.

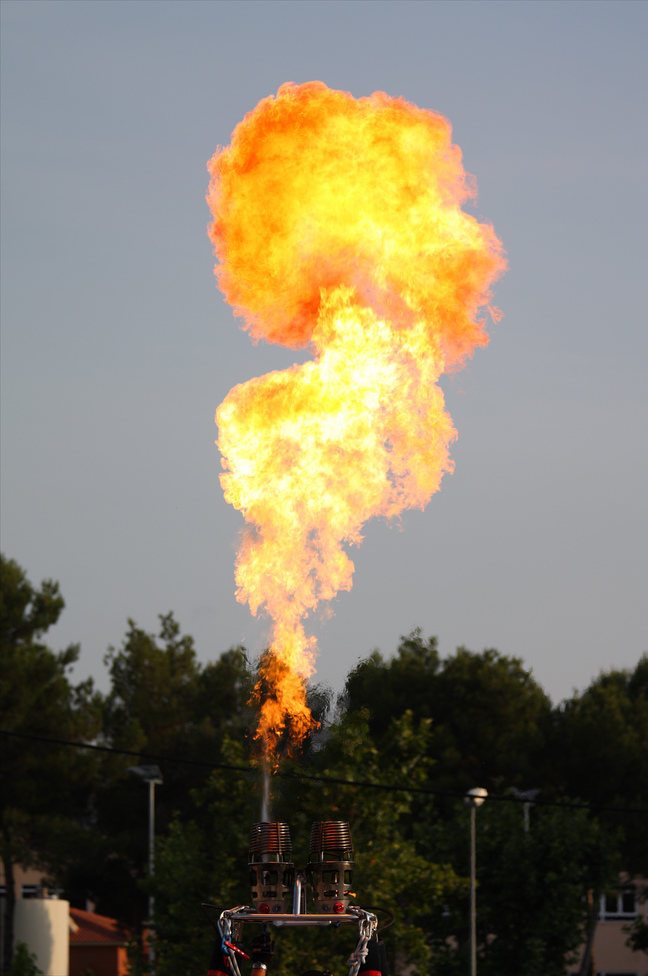
Burner in action, year 2009
