= Igualada Muleteer's Museum =

Museum of Barcelona Province

Muleteer's Museum
- Museu del Traginer
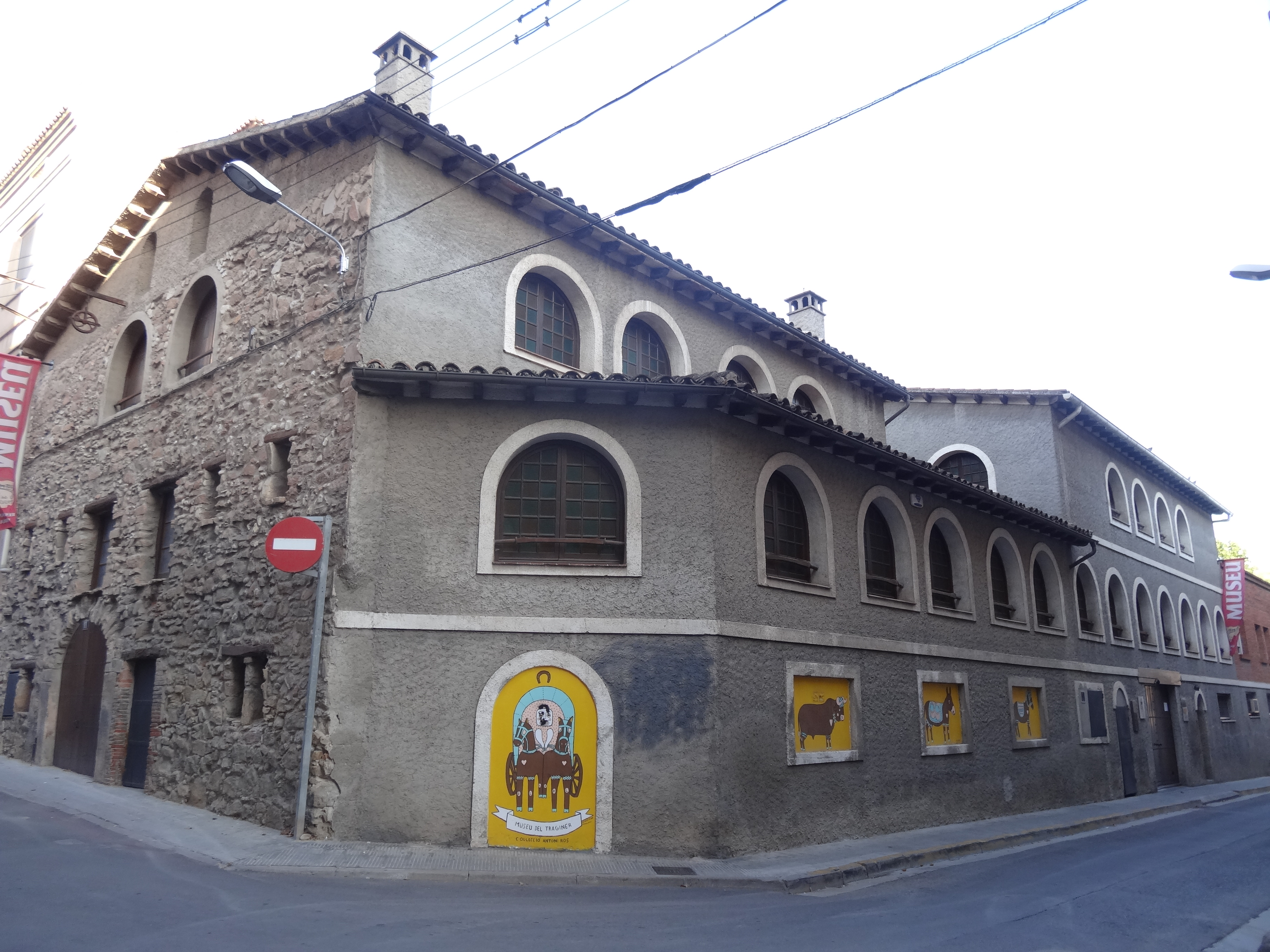
- Established: 2005
- Location: C/ Traginers, 5; 08700, Igualada; Catalonia, Spain
- Coordinates: 41.57798°N 1.612485°E
- Type: Transport, carriages, rural history.
- Website: museudeltraginer.com

The Igualada Muleteer's Museum - Antoni Ros collection (in Catalan language Museu del Traginer - Col·lecció Antoni Ros) is a museum located in Igualada, Catalonia, Spain, that displays the evolution of transport using mules, horses and other animals, and the different relationships between several trades that paved the way for the profession of muleteer, including the carter, cooper, saddler, tanner, wicker weaver, farrier, veterinarian, stablehand, woodcutter and wood hauler, harness maker and blacksmith.

The museum displays 39 carriages and carts and a total of 2.175 items, most of them part of the collection created by Antoni Ros i Vilarrubias (1942–1994). The museum is located near the old city center, at an old farmhouse from the 18th century, which was purchased in the 1970s by the Ros family, a family closely linked to the "Antic Gremi de Traginers d'Igualada" muleteer association.

It is distributed into three main thematic areas ("oficis" - occupations; "selles i guarniments" – saddles and bridles; "carros i carruatges" - carts and carriages).

== History ==
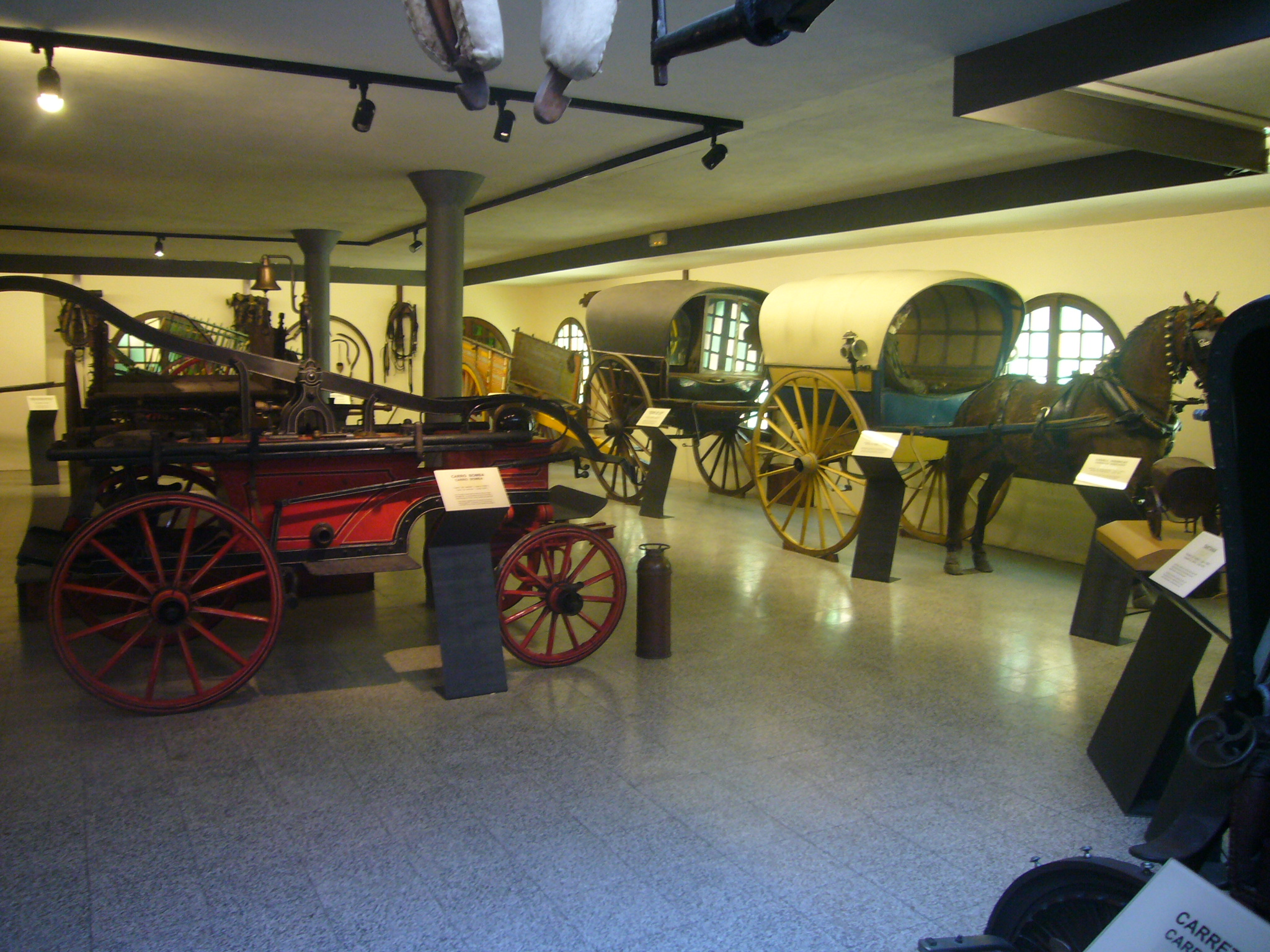
Carriages at the upper floor of the museum

The "Traginer d'Igualada" foundation was created in 1994 in Igualada with the objective of creating the Muleteer's Museum.

The Ros family, owner of the collection created by Antoni Ros i Vilarrubias, was in charge of the foundation, and contacted a team of professionals that prepared the Museum project. The museum was permanently open on September 24, 2005, and became part of the museum network managed by the Diputació de Barcelona.

== Collection ==
The museum has more than 1000 square meters of exhibition space, distributed in 3 floors:

- At the 1st floor there is a room displaying the muleteer trade evolution, and a "Sala dels Oficis" room displaying 10 trades including the carter, cooper, saddler, tanner, wicker weaver, farrier, veterinarian, stablehand, woodcutter and wood hauler, harness maker and blacksmith.
- At the 2nd floor there is a "Sala dels Guarniments" room displaying horse tack, a "Tres Tombs" room showing this tradition, and a "Sala dels carros de servei i pagesia" room showing carts and farming items.
- At the 3rd floor there is a "Sala dels Carruatges de la Burgesia" with carriages, and a room dedicated to Antoni Ros, founder of the museum collection, where there is a display of some sculptures created by him.

== See also ==
- Muleteer
- Igualada Leather Museum
