= Igualada Leather Museum =

Coordinates: 41.57717°N 1.61358°E

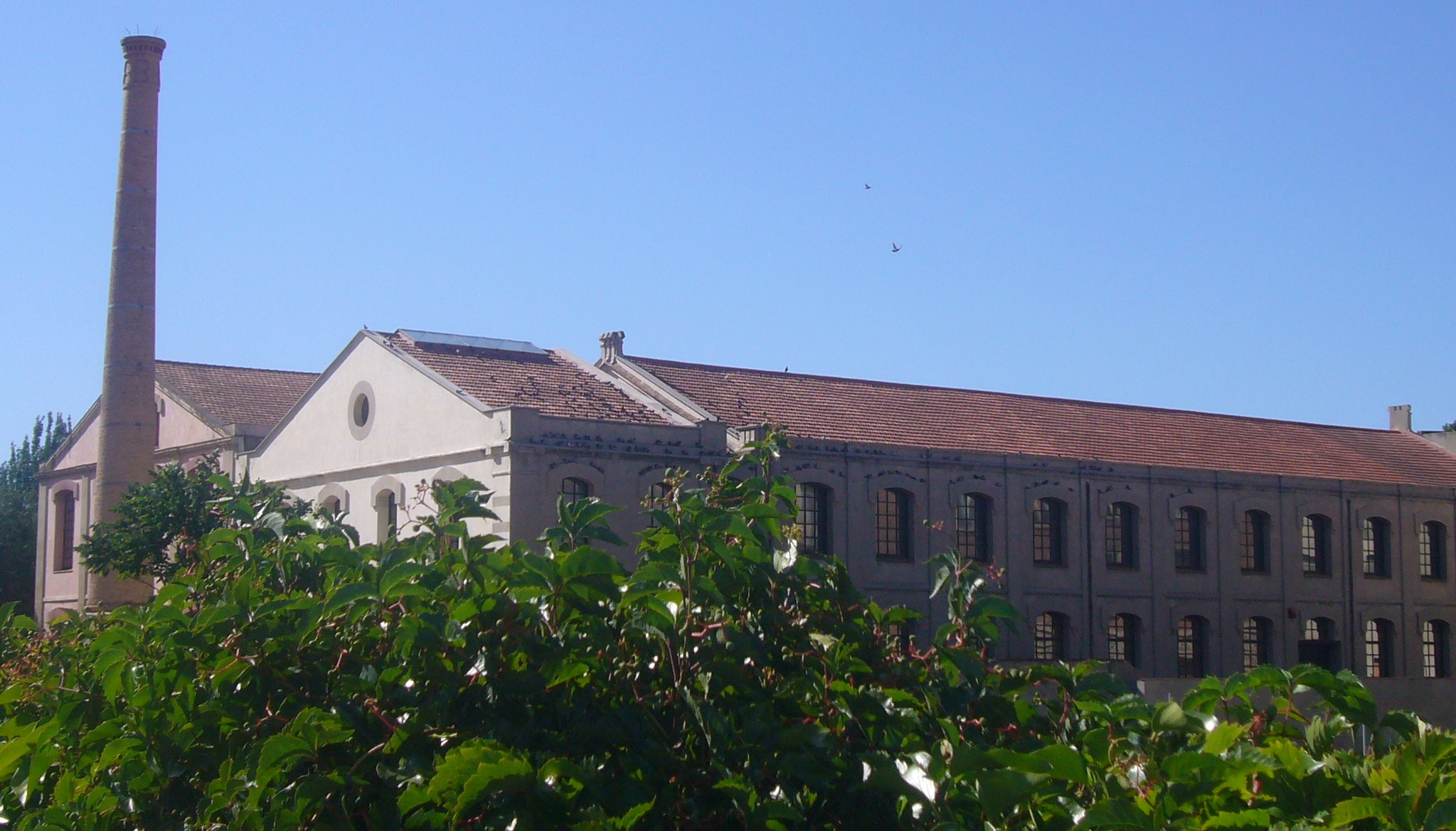
Igualada Leather Museum at the Cal Boyer cotton factory

The Igualada Leather Museum (Catalan: Museu de la Pell d'Igualada), located in Igualada, Catalonia, was created in 1954 and was the first leather museum in Spain, and the third one in Europe. The collections are displayed in two nearby buildings in Igualada: the "Cal Boyer" building, a former cotton textile factory from the late 19th century, and the "Cal Granotes" building, an 18th-century tannery.

== Leather Museum, at "Cal Boyer" ==
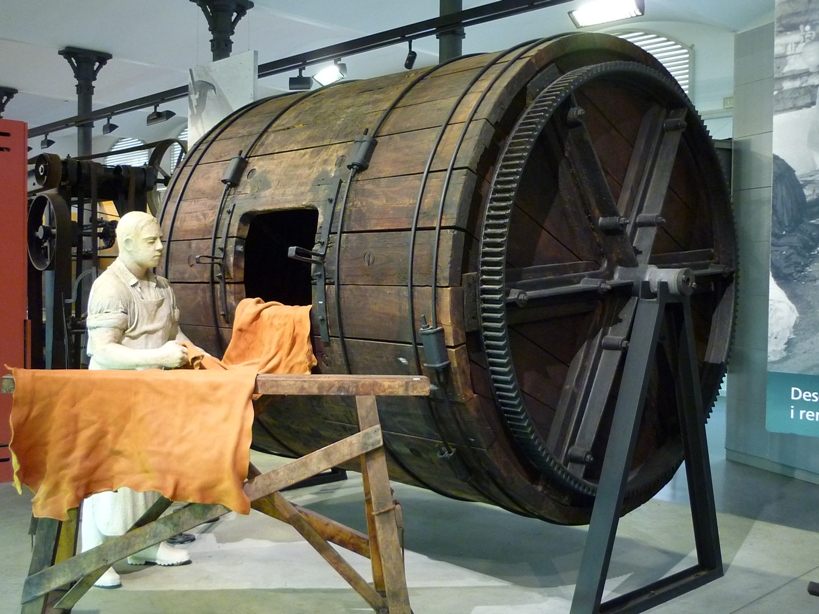
Barrel for leather treatment, Igualada Leather Museum

The Leather Museum, at the "Cal Boyer" building, headquarter of the museum, constitutes the cornerstone of the museum approach. Due to its characteristics and structure it is a unique and pioneering museum, one of the top three in Europe of its kind.

There are three exhibition areas: "leather in history", a "world of leather", and "industrialization". The first one, "leather in history", presents aspects of the production, use and cultural significance of leather in the Mediterranean civilization, from the distant past to recent times, including prehistory, the tanning of hides, leather in ancient Greece and ancient Rome worlds, parchments, bookbinding, shell cordovan use, guadamecil painted or gilded embossed leather (an ancient leather crafting technique), and two traditional professions such as shoemakers and horse tack makers.

The second area, "A world of leather" presents issues related to the leather: sport, war, travel, nomads, leather sounds and music, images, and tactile temptations. In the corresponding videos, it presents five interactive modules illustrating some of the properties of the leather: touch, sound, durability, impermeability and the drill.

The third area, "industrialization", presents recent technical developments in the manufacturing of leather. It is the natural continuation of a historic route that starts at the old tannery of "Cal Granotes", and therefore the end of the route through the museum. It comprises three stages: tanning in Igualada in 1890, which is the successor of the "Cal Granotes" craft tanning method, the first generation of machines, and finally the industrial phase of leather, with the definitive introduction of mechanization in tanning. It displays the processes of production, with the replacement of old processes of fertilization in holes by modern barrels, and the passage of a rudimentary system of work, supported by individual ability and manual effort, to advanced machining using electricity.

== "Cal Granotes" Tannery ==
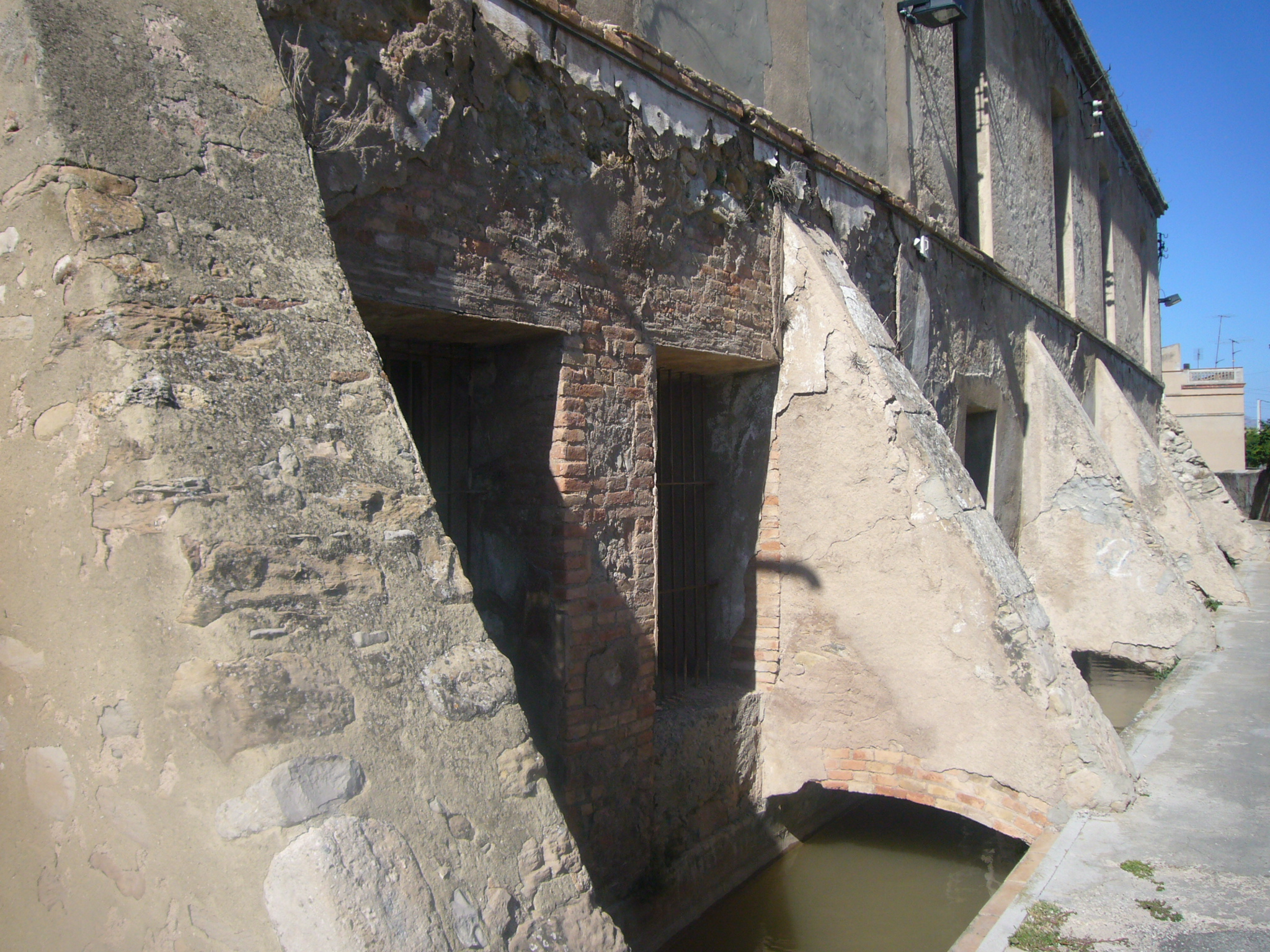
"Cal Granotes" tannery with counterforts along the ditch

The "Cal Granotes" tannery exhibition is a pioneer in its genre. It is located 100 meters away from "Cal Boyer" and was open to the public in December 1990 in the middle of "El Rec", a very old neighborhood spread along a ditch that provided, and still provides, the required water to dozens of tanneries. The "Cal Granotes" 18th century tannery building was restored, and now displays the same tanning processes which were used in the past. The building preserves its original layout to show three totally manual and traditional systems of ox and cow leather tanning for making shoe soles: leather sewing, old Moroccan system and modern Moroccan system.

"Cal Granotes" displays two floors of a typical tannery: the ground floor, where the leather preparation and tanning was done, and the upper floor, where the leather was dried hanging from bars. Most of the production was intended to elaborate shoe soles. It could also be used for clothing: leather horse harness for animals and horse-drawn carriages; backs and seats of chairs, and some time later for manufacturing belts for steam driven factories.

In the early 18th century, the tanning workers from Igualada decided to leave the enclosure of the medieval walls and established new industries along a water pipe or irrigation ditch named "El Rec", already mentioned in 12th century documents and previously used by mills. The ditch has a length of 3049 meters and collects the Anoia river water from a lock.

== People and Water, at Cal Boyer ==
This exhibition opened in 1991 at the Cal Boyer building, and provides an overview of various aspects of water linked to the society. The theme is presented in several sections: the elevation of water, domestic distribution and usage of water, what is water?, water and health, and economic exploitation of water. In 1992 this exhibition was awarded the "FAD prize" of interiorism.

The water theme is further displayed with a big steam engine and a noria, showing the transformation of water into energy, and displaying machinery from the former cotton textile factory of "Cal Boyer". A mud noria has also been restored, which used to raise water to a higher level for irrigation.

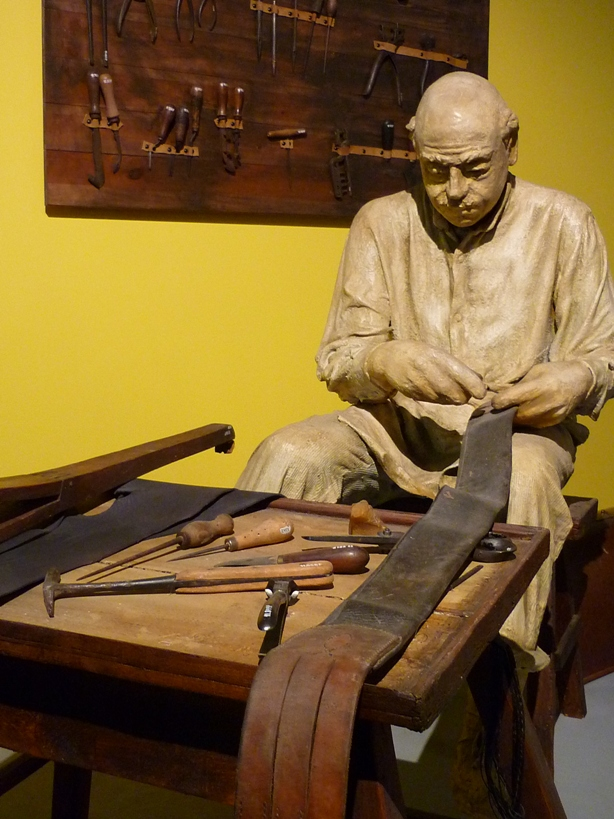
Leatherworking tools, Igualada Leather Museum

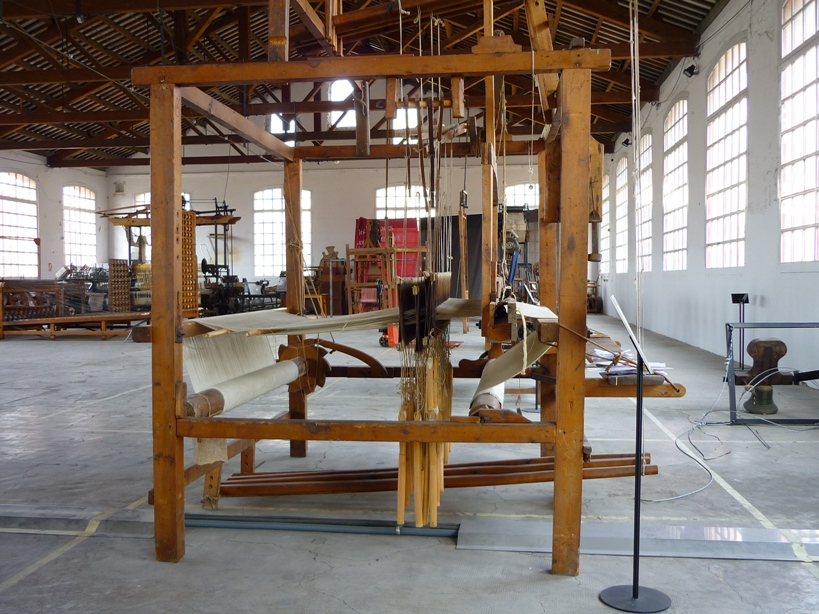
Loom, Igualada Leather Museum

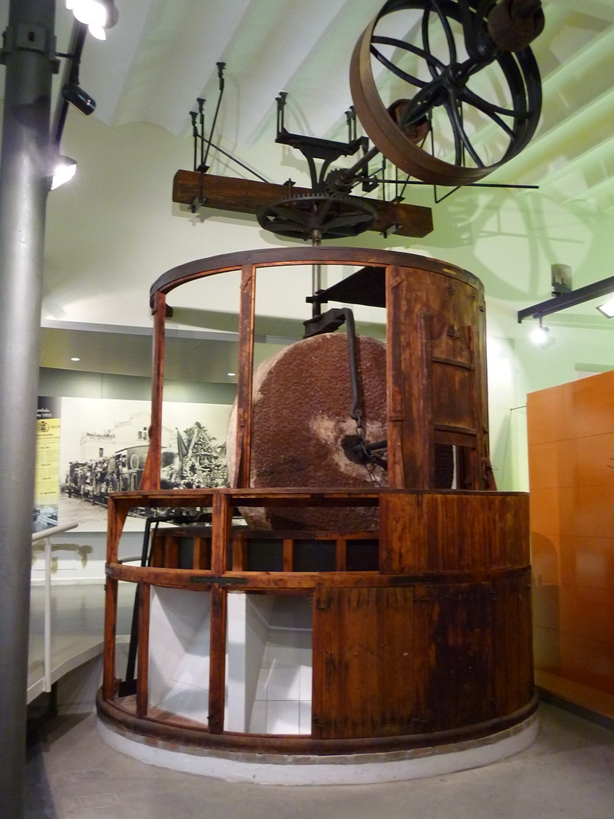

== See also ==
- Igualada Muleteer's Museum
- German Leather Museum
- Walsall Leather Museum
