= Igualada =

- Municipality
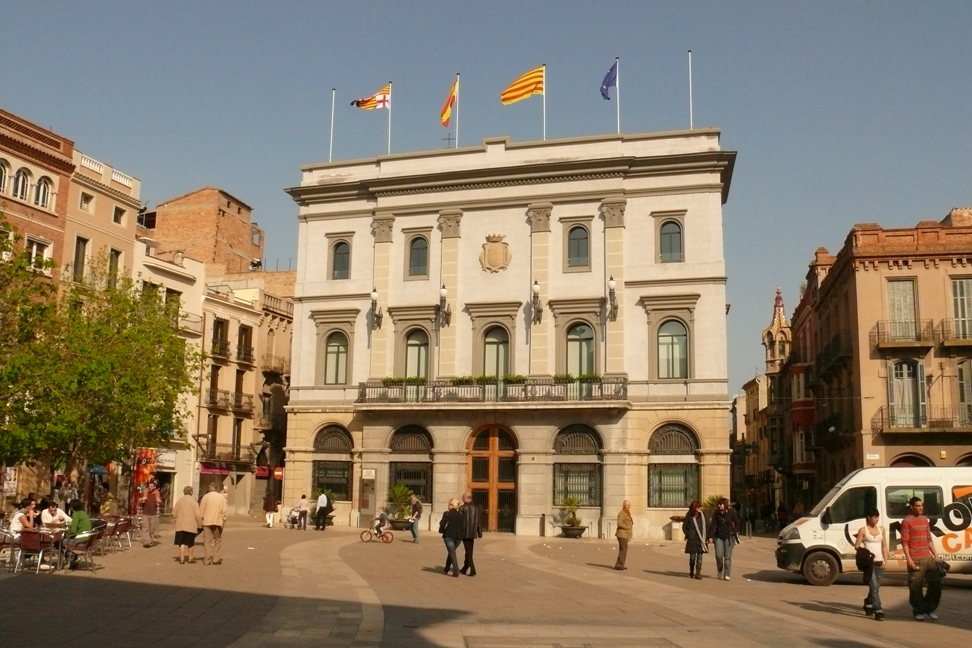
- Igualada town hall

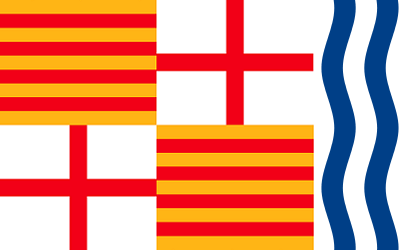
- Flag Coat of arms

- Location in Anoia county

- Location within Catalonia Location within Spain
- Coordinates: 41°35′N 1°37′E
- Sovereign state: Spain
- Community: Catalonia
- Region: Penedès
- County: Anoia
- Province: Barcelona

Government
  - Mayor: Marc Castells Berzosa (2011) (JxC)

Area
  - Total: 8.1 km^{2} (3.1 sq mi)
- Elevation: 313 m (1,027 ft)

Population (2025-01-01)
  - Total: 42,085
  - Density: 5,200/km^{2} (13,000/sq mi)
- Demonym(s): igualadí, -dina
- Postal code: 08700
- Climate: Cfa
- Website: igualada.cat

Igualada (Catalan pronunciation: [iɣwəˈlaðə]) is a municipality and capital of Anoia county in Penedès, Catalonia, Spain. It is located on the left bank of the Anoia River and at the western end of the Igualada branch of the Llobregat–Anoia railway. Igualada is the capital and central market of the Anoia comarca, a rich agricultural and wine-producing district. Its population was 38,918 in 2009.

The city consists of an old town, founded in the 11th century, with narrow and irregular streets, including the remains of a fortress and ramparts, plus a new surrounding town with regular and spacious streets and many fine houses.

The city is 65 kilometres (40 miles) west of Barcelona and 20 kilometres (12 miles) west of the famous mountain and monastery of Montserrat.

Igualada hosts the European Balloon Festival, the largest hot air balloon festival in Spain and one of the largest in Europe. It has taken place every year, since 1997, at the beginning of July. The city also hosts the Aerosport airshow, which takes place every year in April or May.

== History ==
Igualada was founded around the year 1000 on the left bank of the Anoia River, which gives its name to the region. The name "Igualada" comes from the Latin aqualata, meaning "where the river widens," a reference to the river being effectively used for hydraulic energy to power mills.

The town originated at the crossroads of two important routes: one was a military road from Manresa, passing through Òdena and Montbui, and continuing toward the distant castles of Tarragona. The other was the main royal road connecting Barcelona with Lleida, Aragon, and Castile. Located in the heart of the Òdena Basin, Igualada became a natural meeting point for farmers and merchants, facilitating trade and commerce.

The first known construction in the town was a chapel built in 1003 beside a mota or força, a small defensive fortification. The chapel was officially recognized as a parish in 1059.

In 1381, Igualada was granted the status of Carrer de Barcelona, bringing it under the protection of the city of Barcelona and granting it the same rights, freedoms, and privileges. The town continued to grow, and between the 14th and 15th centuries, two walls were built. By the 18th century, the town expanded toward the Soldevila and Capdevila neighborhoods, following the Camí Ral (Royal Road).

Although Igualada experienced steady growth in its early centuries, its most significant expansion occurred in the 19th and 20th centuries. During this period, the town received the title of City and gained a railway connection, leading to remarkable economic growth. The textile industry became one of the most important in Catalonia, while the leather tanning industry mechanized and became the leading producer in the Iberian Peninsula. The first knitting industries also emerged, eventually gaining national significance. Between 1800 and 1900, the population doubled, reaching 10,486 inhabitants. By 2005, the city had over 35,000 residents within a municipal area of just eight square kilometers.

=== AQUALATA, The Legend of Igualada’s Formation ===
In ancient times, the Òdena Basin was a vast lake, stretching between the Claramunt Castle mountain and the Three Mollons mountain. This large body of water gave its name to the river in that area, Aqualata, meaning "wide water."

Near this lake, on a large farmhouse atop the Òdena hill, lived a farmer known for his foul temper and harsh character. He was so unpleasant that all his hired workers would eventually flee. In desperation, he vowed to sell his soul to the devil if he could get help. As soon as he spoke the words, the Devil himself appeared, disguised as a laborer, and agreed to take care of everything—on one condition: as long as the farmer had work to assign him, he would serve faithfully, but if there was ever nothing left to command, the Devil would claim his soul forever.

Eventually, the farmer ran out of tasks to give, and in a desperate attempt to delay his fate, he ordered the Devil to drain the massive lake that covered the region. The Devil complied, extracting enormous rocks and soil, causing a great upheaval and tremors throughout the land, leading to the formation of the Three Mollons mountain. When the work was finished, the farmer had nothing more to order, and the Devil took his soul to Hell. To this day, the city's coat of arms features water at its base, symbolizing the time when the area was a great lake.

=== The Way of Saint James through Igualada ===
The Way of Saint James (Camiño de Santiago in Galician, Camino de Santiago in Spanish, Camin de Sant Jacme in Occitan, and Chemin de Saint Jacques in French) refers to the pilgrimage route that travelers from across Europe take to reach the Cathedral of Santiago de Compostela. One section of this route passes through Igualada, following the path from Montserrat. After a 24.6 km journey from Montserrat, pilgrims traditionally stop in Igualada before continuing. Today, the Way of Saint James in Catalonia follows the route from Montserrat to Lleida, Zaragoza, and Logroño. This path is the most direct and easiest, making it the most commonly used route in Catalonia today.

=== COVID-19 pandemic ===
Igualada was hard hit by the COVID-19 pandemic in Spain. Its hospital was identified as a hotspot of the coronavirus. Police guarded every entry and exit point, and allowed only essential workers to enter or leave. Igualada was cut off from the rest of the country, as a lockdown within a lockdown.

== Main sights ==
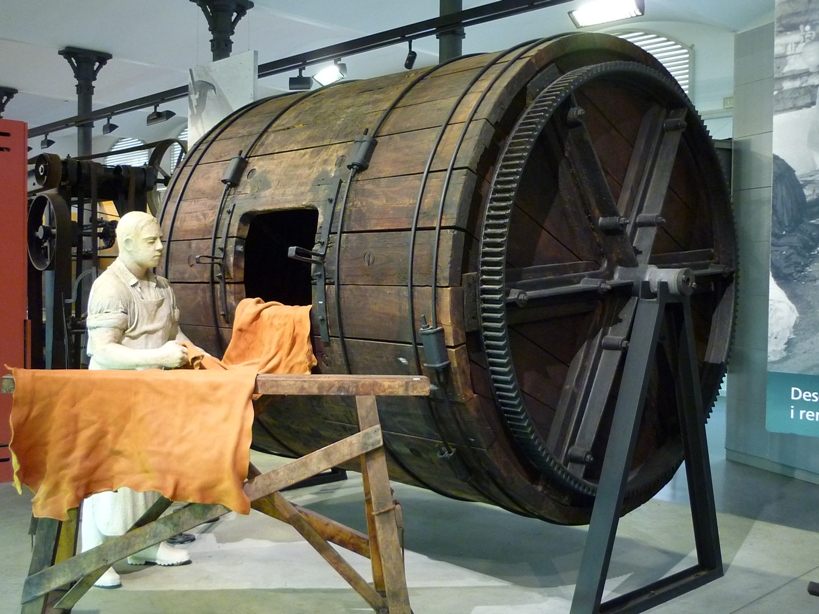
Barrel for leather tanning, Igualada Leather Museum

=== Igualada Leather Museum ===
The Igualada Leather Museum (Museu de la Pell d'Igualada) opened in 1954. It was the first leather museum in Spain and the third in Europe. The collections are displayed in two nearby buildings in Igualada: the "Cal Boyer" building, a former cotton textile factory from the late 19th century, and the "Cal Granotes" building, an 18th-century tannery.

"Cal Granotes" displays two floors of a typical tannery: the ground floor, where the leather preparation and tanning was done, and the upper floor, where the leather was dried hanging from bars.

In the early 18th century, the tanning workers from Igualada decided to leave the enclosure of the medieval walls and established new industries along a water pipe or irrigation ditch named "El Rec", already mentioned in 12th-century documents and previously used by mills. The ditch has a length of 3,049 meters (3,334 yd) and collects the Anoia river water from a lock.

=== Muleteer's Museum (Museu del Traginer) ===
The "Igualada Muleteer's Museum - Antoni Ros Collection" explains the evolution of transport using animals such as mules, horses, oxen, and the different relationships that paved the way for the profession of muleteer. It is distributed into three main thematic areas: professions, saddles and bridles, and carriages.

=== Igualada Cemetery ===
The new Igualada Cemetery was designed by the architects Enric Miralles and Carme Pinós after winning an architectural competition in 1984. Constructed between 1985 and 1994 as a replacement for the old "Cemetery Vell", it has become widely regarded as one of the most poetic works of the 20th century Catalan architecture. Enric Miralles, who died in year 2000 is buried in one of the tombs.

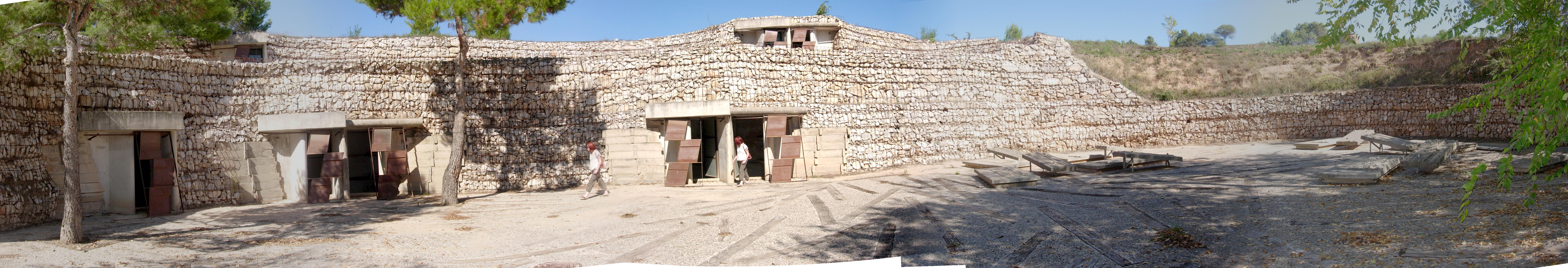
Panoramic view of the new Igualada Cemetery

=== Church of Santa Maria ===
The Basilica of Santa Maria is the most important historical building of Igualada. The first settlement of Igualada is dated around year 1000, in the location were the current church lies today, which was at that time a crossing of two routes which were linking Barcelona with Aragon, and north of Catalonia with its south. Santa Maria church origin is from the 11th century, but the current building is mainly from the 17th century. During the Spanish Civil War it was converted into a market, and was restored after the war, under the guidance of the architect Cèsar Martinell. In 1949 Santa Maria obtained the title of Minor Basilica granted by the pope Pius XII.

=== Nursing home "Asil del Sant Crist" ===
The asil del Sant Crist is one of the most special buildings in Igualada and serves as a nursing home of elder people. Construction started in year 1931 thanks to a donation from Magdalena, Dolors and Concepció Castells and finished in 1941 after the Spanish Civil War. It was designed by Joan Rubió i Bellver, pupil of Antoni Gaudí, in late modernisme style, mixed with influences from the traditional Catalan architecture.

=== Rail home "Museu del tren" ===
The largest model railway exhibition in Spain and museum dedicated to trains and railways. Curated by Antoni Rabell, it took 15 years to create a model railway display. A guided tour is available during the visit.

== Economy ==
The local industries, mainly developed since 1880, include the manufacture of cotton, linen, wool, ribbons, cloth, chocolate, soap, brandies, leather, cards and nails.

Igualada has a long tradition of tanning and textile industries. The competition from low-cost countries that produce inexpensive textile products and the stricter environmental laws applied on tanneries have had a serious impact on the local economy. Despite that, there are several well-known textile companies that keep their headquarters in Igualada, including Buff, Sita Murt and Punto Blanco.

Igualada is also home to Ultramagic, the only manufacturer of hot air balloons in Spain.

== Transportation ==
Igualada's railway station is the terminus of a line connecting with Plaça d'Espanya in Barcelona. The A-2 motorway between Madrid and Barcelona bypasses the town.

== Sports ==
- Igualada is home to the Igualada Hoquei Club, founded in 1950 and one of the top roller hockey clubs in Europe, having won the European Champions League of Rink Hockey six times and the Spanish League five times.
- The local soccer team is CF Igualada, founded in 1939 and currently playing at the Primera Catalana league.
- There is also a local Rugby Union Team, Anoia Rugby, who were founded in 2013 and ply their trade in Catalonia's third rugby division.
- Pep Clotet, football manager and former player, comes from Igualada.

== International relations ==
=== Twin towns – Sister cities ===
Igualada is twinned with:

- Lecco, Italy
- Guimarães, Portugal
- Alcántara, Spain
- Nueva Esperanza, Jiquilisco, El Salvador
- Aksakovo, Bulgaria
