= Virgin Balloon Flights =

UK hot air balloon ride brand (1994-)

- Trade name: AntonAir
- Type: Limited
- Industry: hot air balloon flights
- Founded: 1994
- Headquarters: Telford, Shropshire, England
- Number of locations: 148 launch sites in the UK, 3 in Italy
- Area served: United Kingdom, Italy
- Owner: Kenneth Karlstrom
- Website: www.virginballoonflights.co.uk

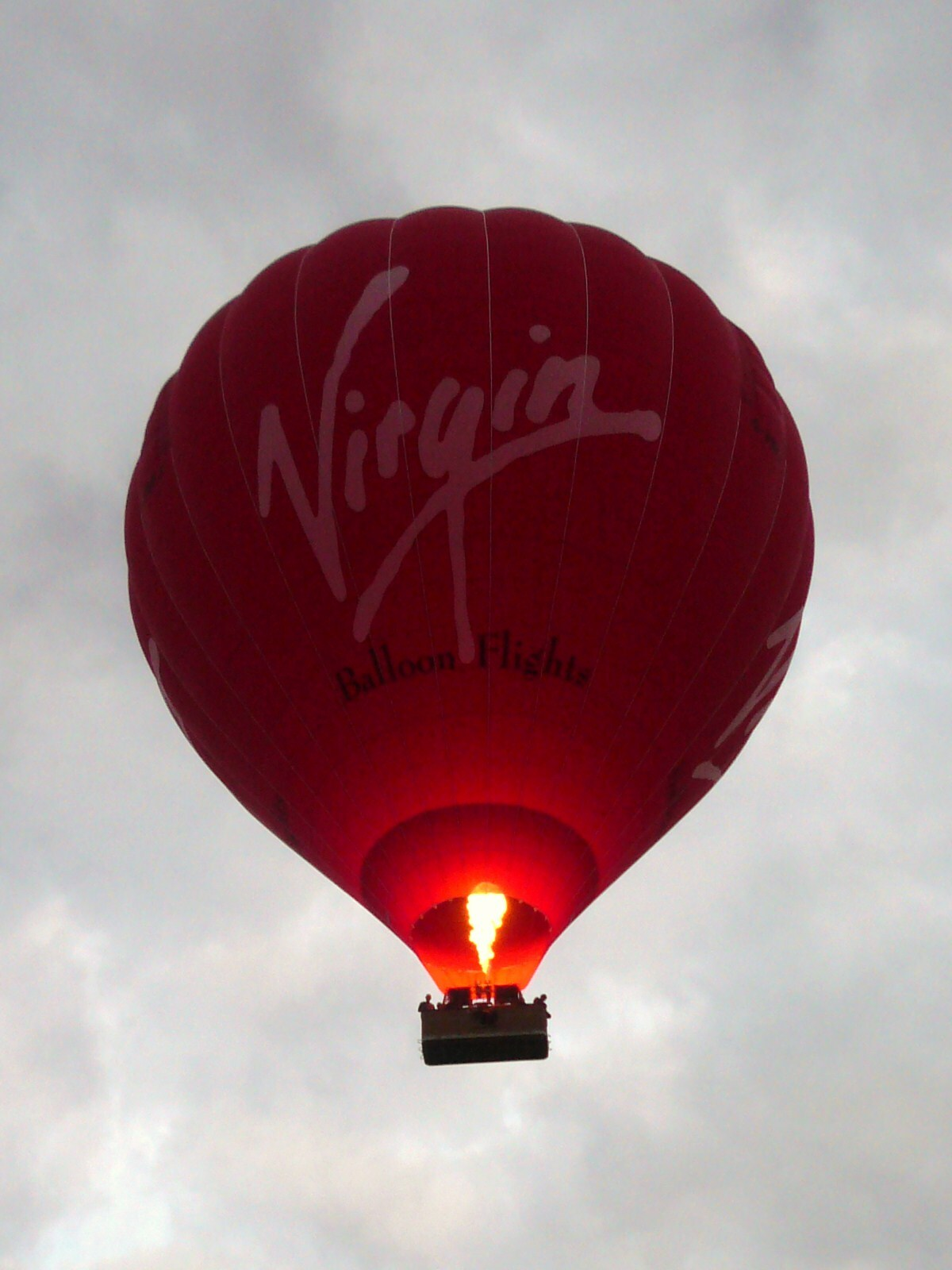
Virgin hot air balloon

Virgin Balloon Flights, with headquarters in Telford, Shropshire, began flying hot air balloons in 1994 and its passengers are still flown in red and white balloons with the Virgin Group logo on the side of the balloon.

Virgin Balloon Flights owns and operate the largest passenger carrying balloon service in the United Kingdom as well as the largest balloon fleet in the UK. The company has over 100 launch sites throughout the United Kingdom (including Crowborough, Shrewsbury and Castle Fraser), employs more than 22 pilots who carry out the balloon flights and is affiliated to the following organisations:

- Civil Aviation Authority (CAA)
- British Balloon & Airship Club (BBAC)
- British Association of Balloon Operators (BABO)

Since 2002, Virgin Balloon Flights has been the trading name for AirXcite Limited.

In 2006 it acquired a N-355 balloon manufactured by Ultramagic. This new balloon, that takes a 355,000 cu ft (10,100 m^{3}) of air and can carry a basket with up to 16 passengers, replaced a smaller Cameron 340 balloon.

Recently Virgin Balloon Flights expanded to Italy via the sister company of AirXcite, Ballooning in Tuscany, also owned by Kenneth Karlstrom. It now has 3 launch sites in Tuscany (Florence, Siena and Poggibonsi).

== See also ==
- Hot air ballooning
