= Aerosport (air show) =

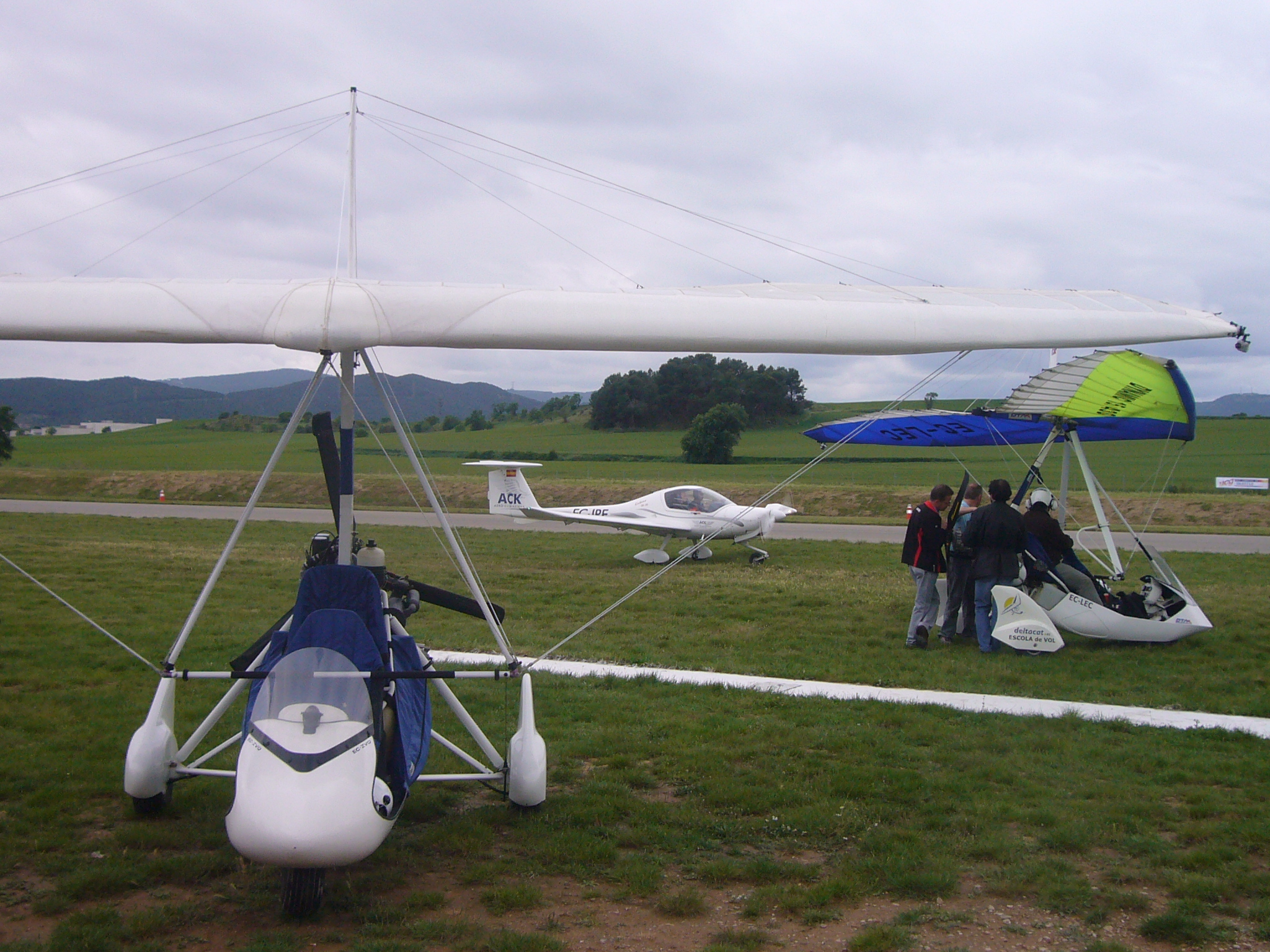
- Aerosport 2011, ultralight aircraft at the middle, with 2 DeltaTrikes at the sides
- Genre: Commercial air show
- Dates: April or May
- Frequency: Yearly
- Venue: Igualada-Òdena aerodrome
- Locations: Igualada, Catalonia
- Coordinates: 41.587736°N 1.651508°E
- Country: Spain
- Established: 1993
- Major events: aerobatic displays static displays
- Website: firaigualada.org/aerosport

Aerosport is an air show that takes place at the Igualada-Òdena aerodrome (Barcelona Province in Spain) every year since 1993. It is the only Spanish air show fully dedicated to corporate and sport aircraft.

The show includes displays, demonstrations and flights of ultralight aircraft, autogyros, gliders, acrobatic aircraft, paramotors, helicopters, amateur aircraft, aeronautical accessories, flight training schools, clubs and a secondhand market. The show includes technical conferences regarding topics such as cartography and air space, aircraft engines, insurances and the history or aircraft.

== History ==
The first edition of Aerosport took place in 1993. The third edition in 1995, gathered 40 exhibitors, mainly from Catalonia and the rest of Spain, but also from France, Italy or Belgium. It included demonstrations of hang gliding, paragliding, paramotors, ultralight aircraft, parachuting, gliding, helicopters, firefighting and an acrobatic show. For several years the show was one of the components of the "Igualada Air Week" together with the European Balloon Festival, the largest hot air balloon festival in Spain, that takes place in July.

Aerosport was modified in 2008 and was adapted to the requirements of the business visitors, placing more emphasis on professional activities and less in entertainment, converting it into a professional show. The show was moved to the months of April or May, and included high-level conferences, demonstrations and flight simulations. Some entertainment activities were moved to the month of July.

In 2010, 51% of the exhibitors came from Catalonia, 41% from the rest of Spain, and 8% from the rest of the world.

== Awards ==
In 2007 Aerosport received the "Flyer Award", in the category of 'Best development and divulgation of the aeronautic industry', in recognition for being a unique event in Spain, with the highest repetition rate among participants, more than 4000 first flights, and a school for young pilots.

== Images ==
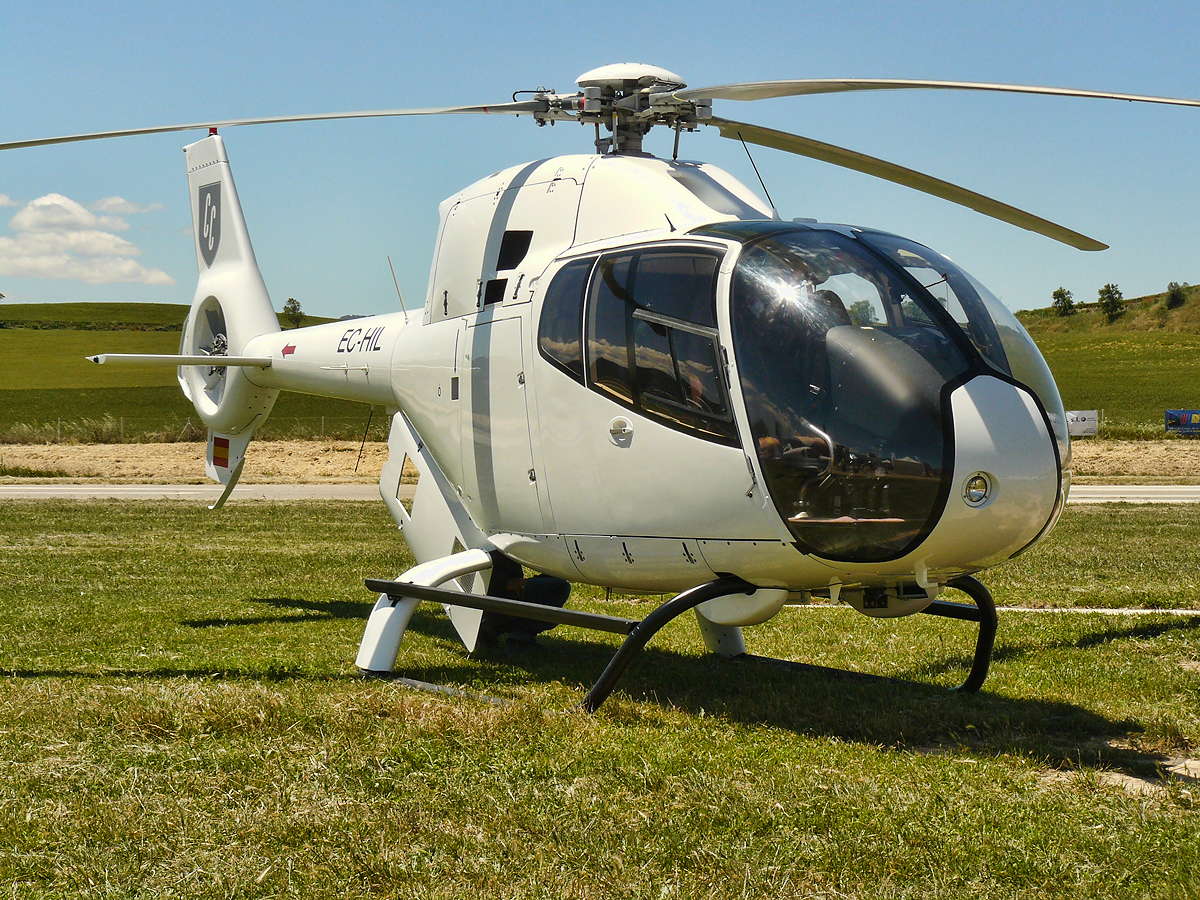
Eurocopter EC 120 (Aerosport 2013)

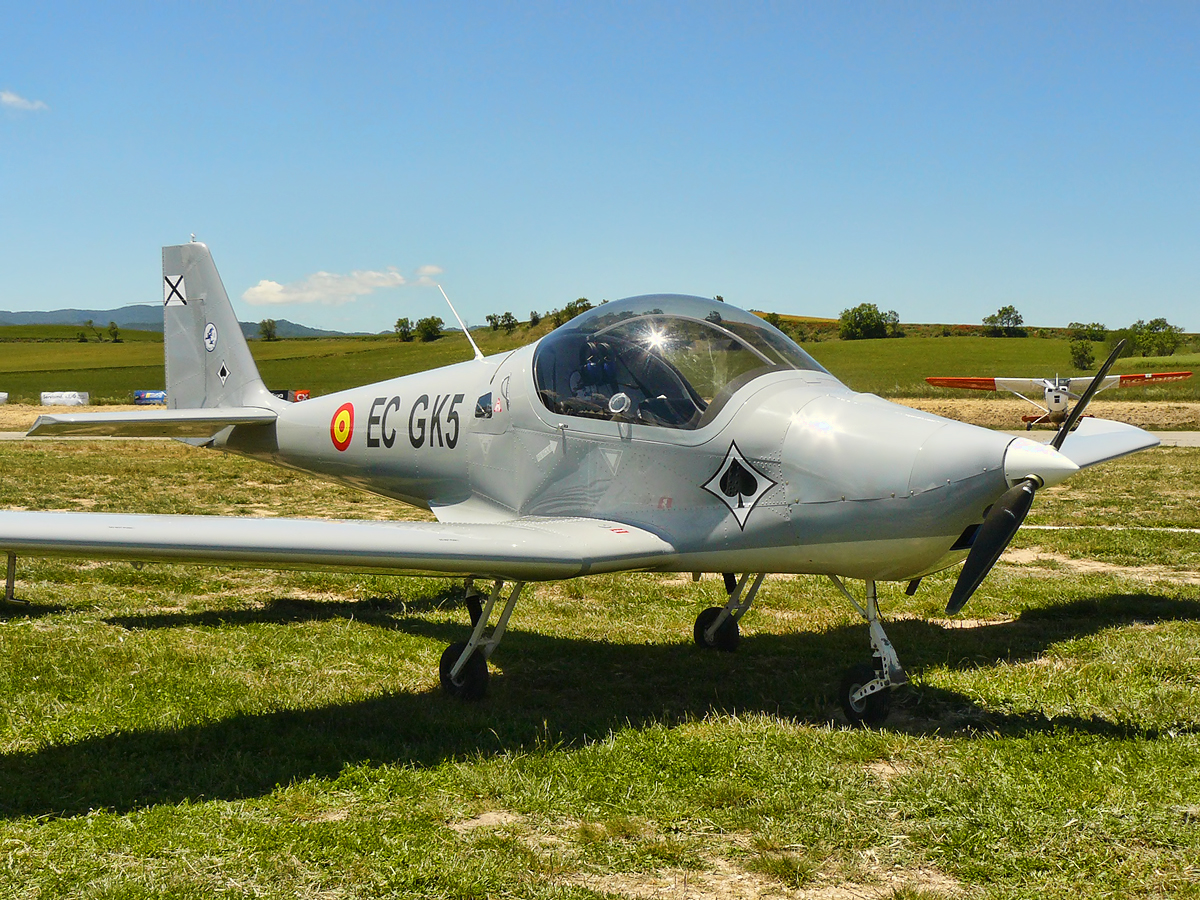
A Kappa 77 KP 2U-SOVA (Aerosport 2013)

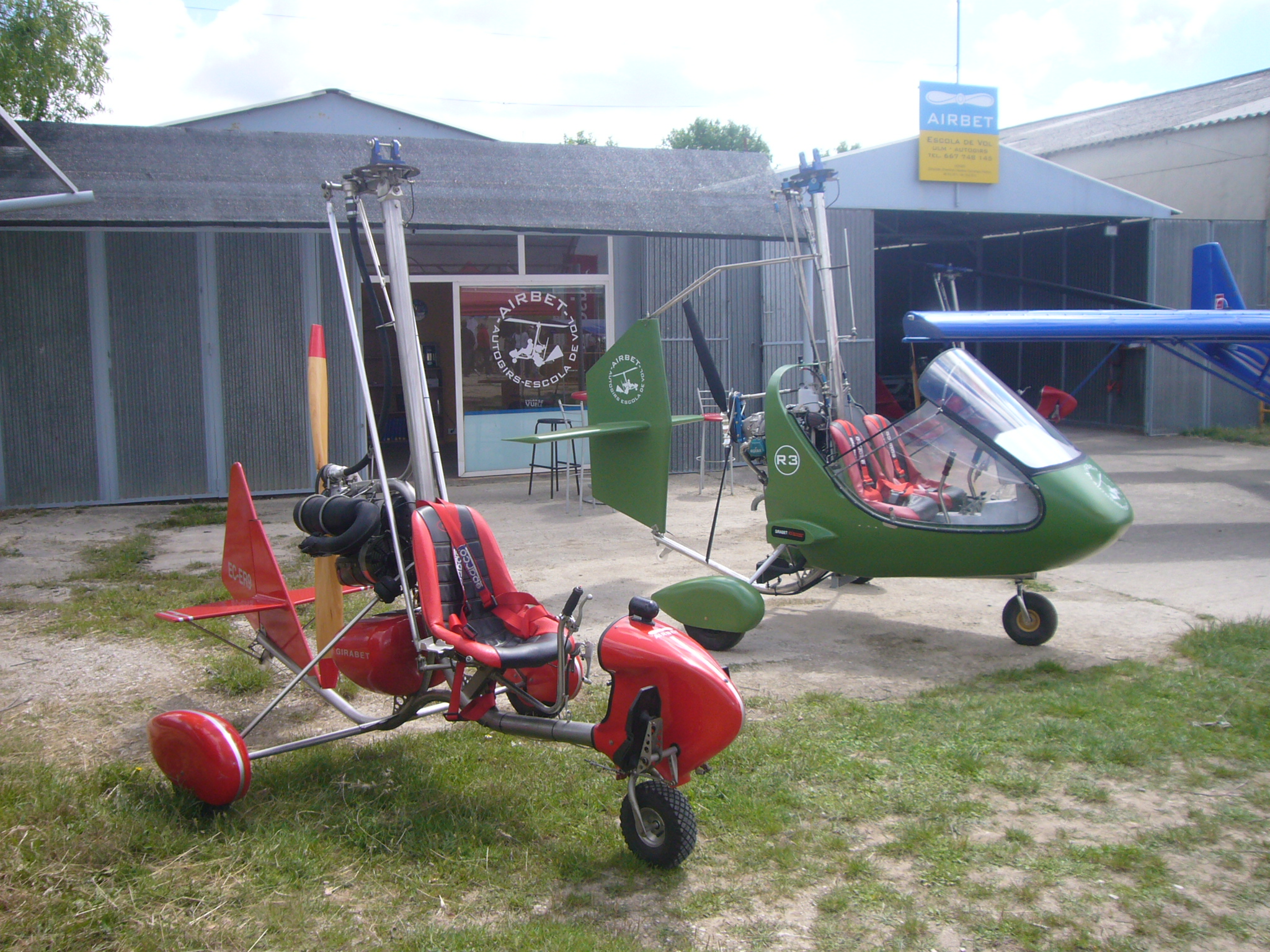
Airbet Girabet autogyros (Aerosport 2013)

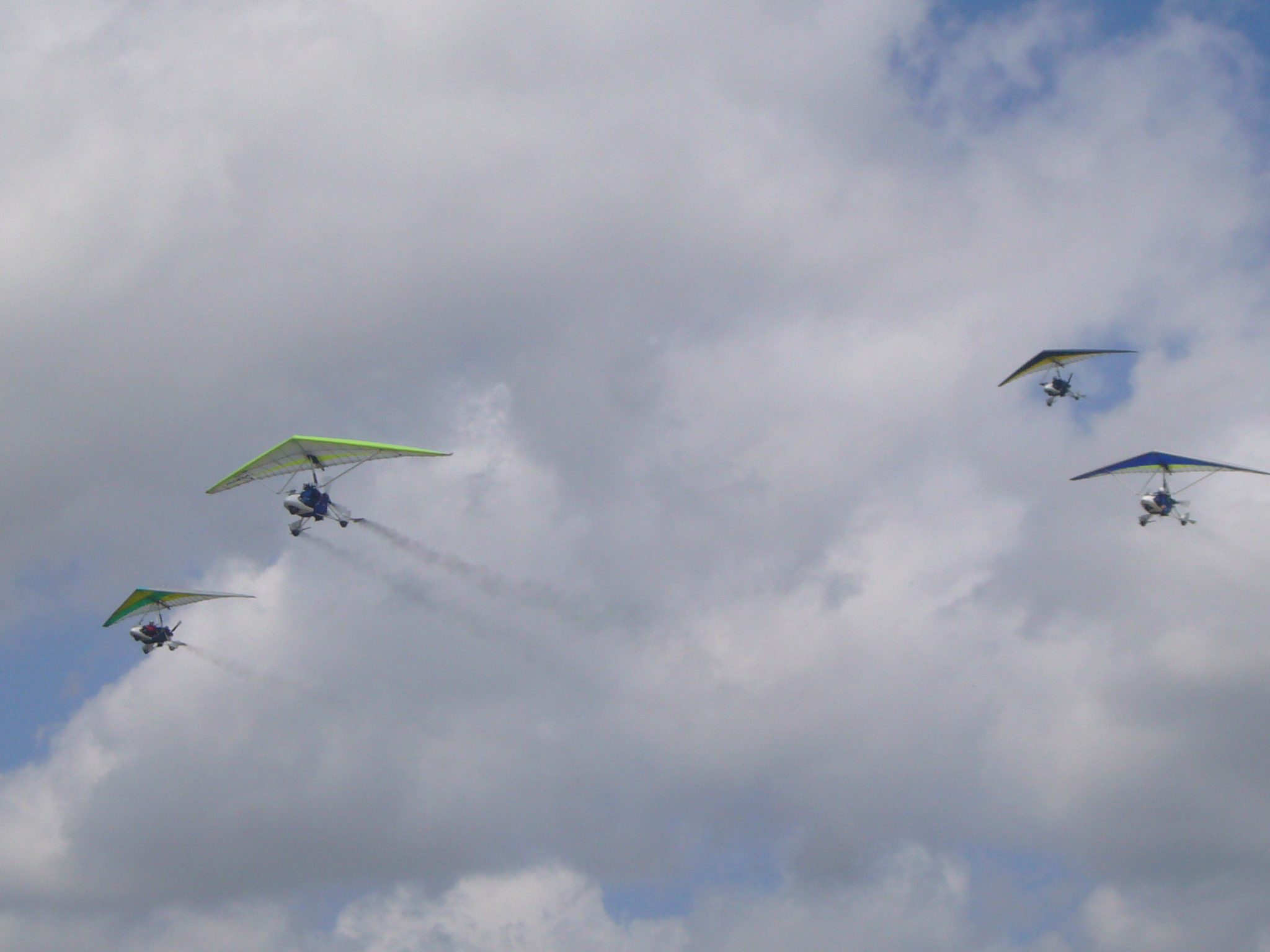
Four ultralight trikes (Aerosport 2013)

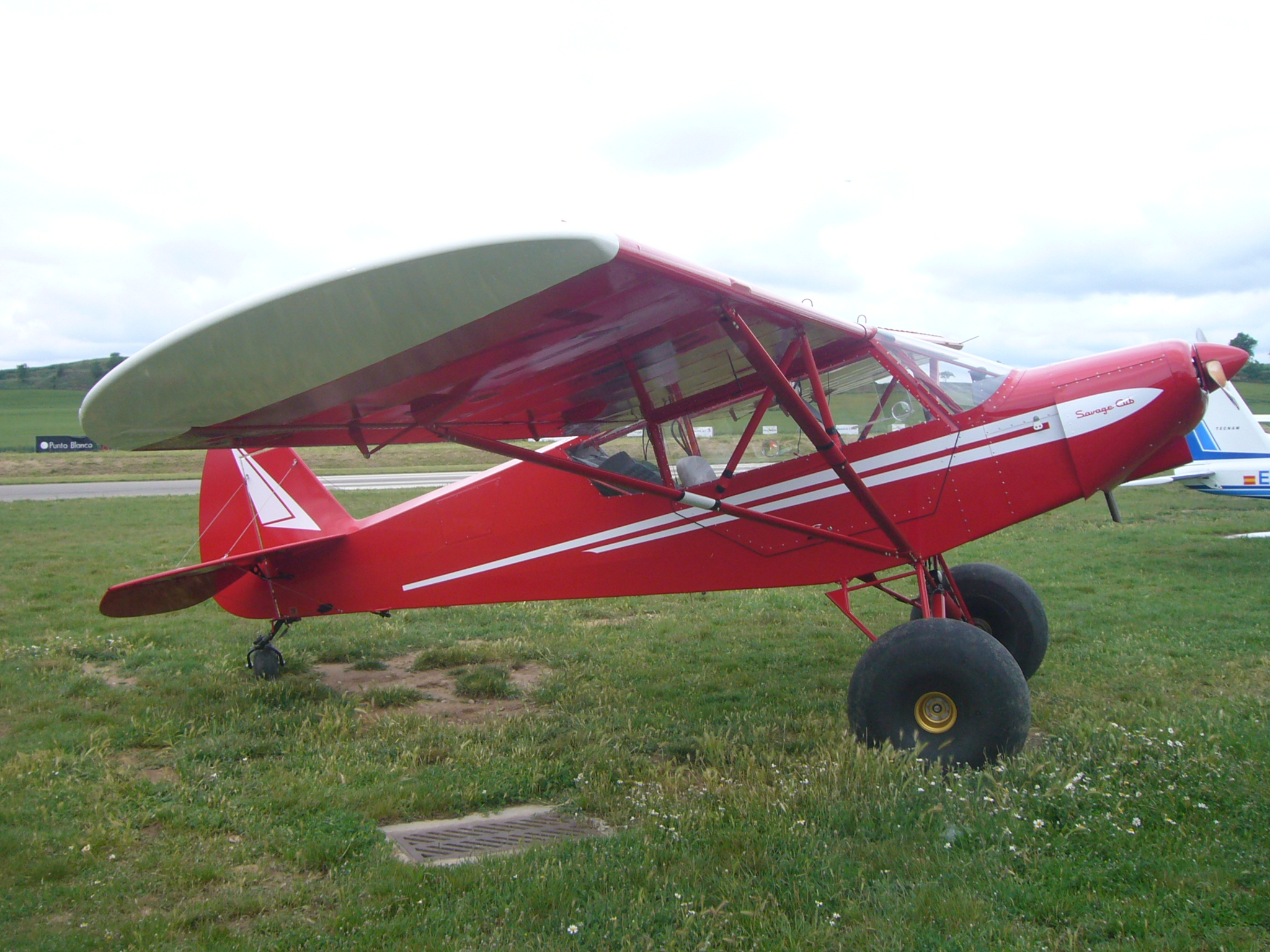
A Zlin Savage Cub light-sport aircraft (Aerosport 2011)

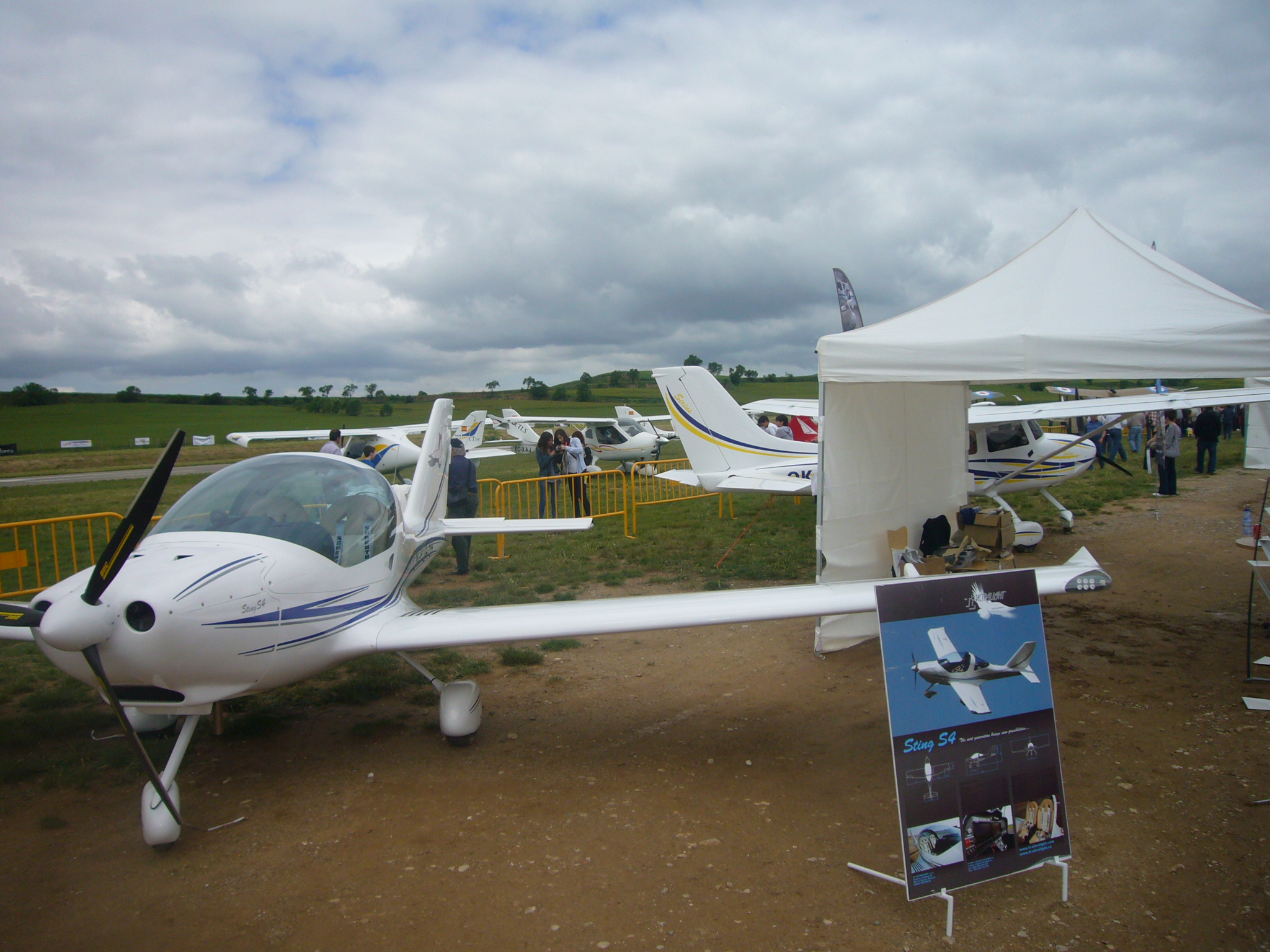
Sting S4, manufactured by TL-Ultralight (Aerosport 2011)
