= Ultramagic =

Coordinates: 41.587285°N 1.652808°E

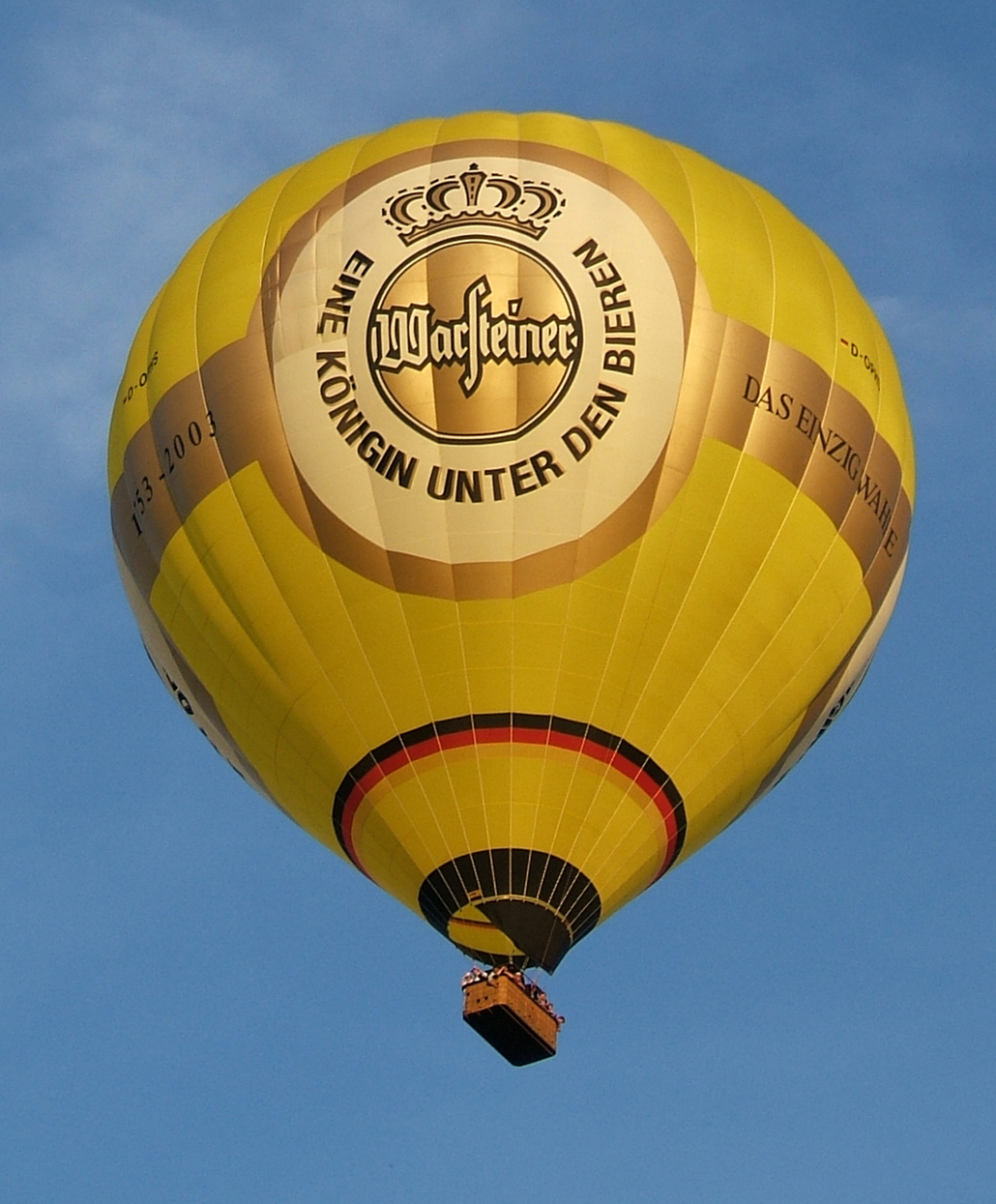
Ultramagic N-355 hot air balloon (volume of 10,000 m³, for up to 20 persons) registered in Germany and sponsored by Warsteiner

Ultramagic (Catalan: [ˌultɾəˈmaʒik], Spanish: [ˈultɾaˈmaʝik]) is a manufacturer of hot air balloons, based at the Igualada-Òdena Aerodrome, province of Barcelona, Catalonia. It is the only manufacturer of hot air balloons in Spain, and the second largest in the world. The company produces from 80 to 120 balloons per year, with 80% of them exported to Europe, North America, South America, Africa and Japan. The company can produce massive balloons, such as the N-500 that accommodates up to 27 persons in the basket. Ultramagic has also produced many balloons with special shapes, as well as cold air inflatables.

Ultramagic is one of the organizers of the European Balloon Festival, the largest hot air balloon festival in Spain and in South Europe, held in Igualada since 1997 in the month of July, that includes competitions, exhibitions and a night glow. The festival gathers around 60 balloonists from Europe, and other countries such as Israel, India, Japan, Brazil and Argentina.

== History ==
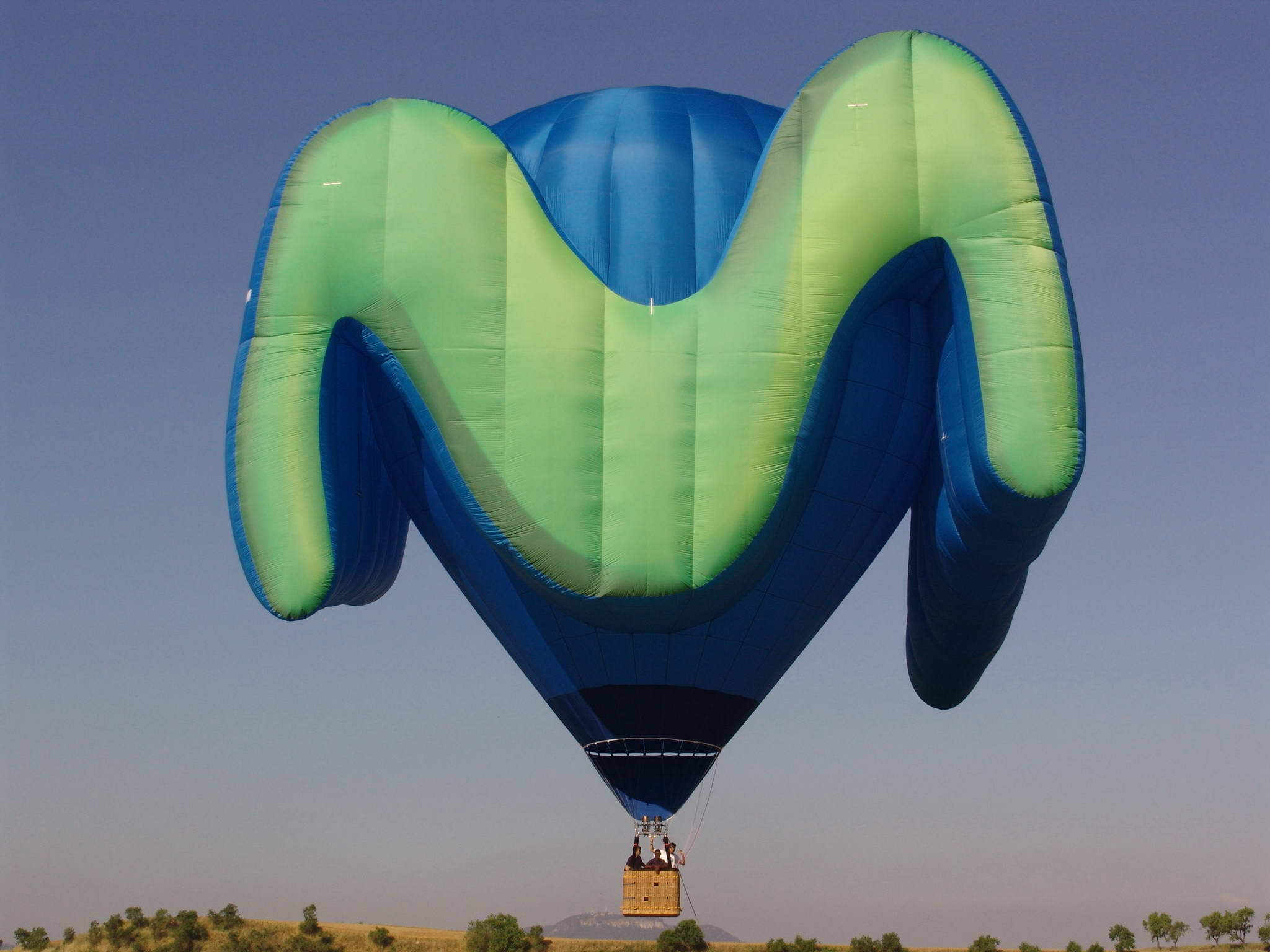
Ultramagic special shape balloon, managed by Paseosenglobo and sponsored by Movistar

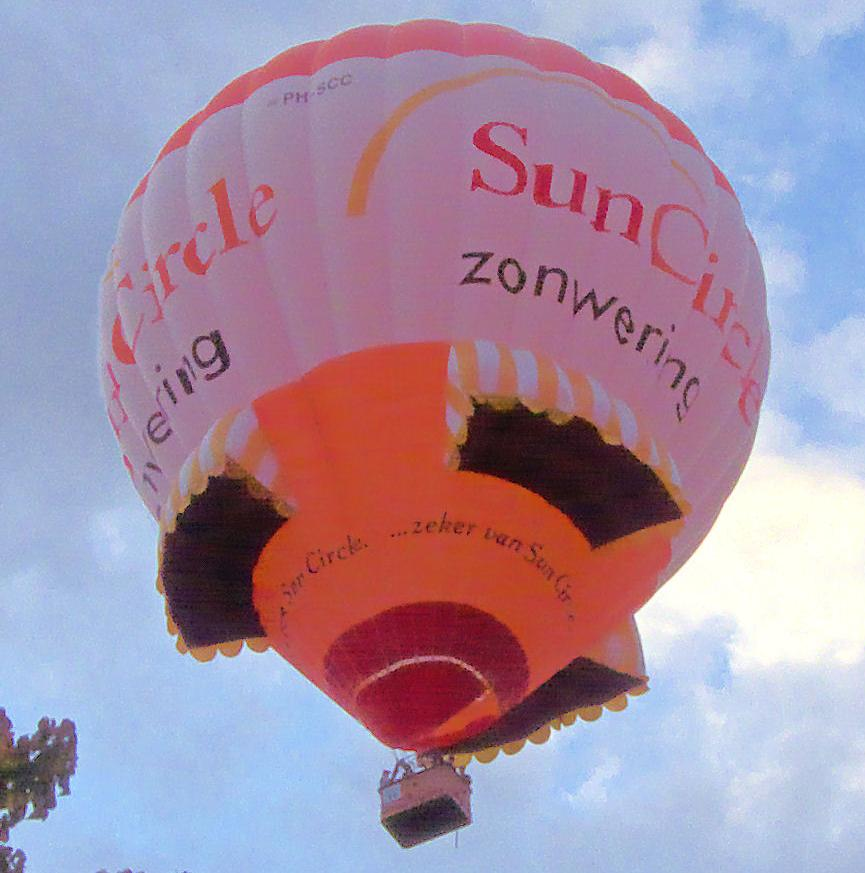
Ultramagic N-180 with special shapes, registered in the Netherlands

The company has its roots in 1978 when three friends, Josep Maria Lladó, aeronautical engineer and balloonist, Joan Comellas and Jaume Llansana, started to fly with a second-hand hot air balloon, and soon after decided to build a bigger balloon, named "Tramuntana", for a long journey in Africa, because they had not enough money to purchase an already manufactured balloon. This journey took place 1980, lasting 11 months, with 40 balloon flights starting from Zanzibar, going to Tanzania, Ruanda and part of Zaire to finalize in Kisangani, current Democratic Republic of the Congo. After that, they started to design an ultralight aircraft and created the company Ultramagic SA, together with Carles Lladó, brother of Josep Maria. Ultramagic Ultralights evolved to Ultramagic Balloons, because after building an ultralight prototype they saw it was complex, required lot of funds, lot of components had to be imported, and serial production was required to be profitable. On top of that, they had experience manufacturing balloons and they still had the sewing machines and an aeronautic background.

The company launched in 1993 a cold air inflatables division, with 4.000 units manufactured until today. Production of inflatables is around 500 units per year.

In 2006 Ultramagic sold a massive N-355 balloon to Virgin Balloon Flights, the UK's largest passenger carrying balloon company. This new balloon took 355,000 cu ft (10,100 m^{3}) of air and was able to carry a basket with up to 16 passengers.

In year 2009, Ultramagic made the first official flight of the "Ecomagic", an eco-friendly hot air balloon, with a reduced consumption, developed together with the School of Aeronautic Engineering of Technische Universität Berlin. The textile fabric used by this balloon has a double layer to better isolate the hot air, thus reducing consumption and allowing longer flights. The Ecomagic consumption is less than 50% of a standard balloon, and can even reach a 30%.

In 2013, it introduced the Ultramagic Flightpack, a new tablet application which gives balloon pilots all the information required for flight in one place.

== Customer types ==
The hot air balloons produced by Ultramagic have three main types of customers:

- Individuals, who use them to participate in competitions or festivals.
- Professionals, who use them in commercial flights and often have a sponsor.
- Companies, who use them in tourist flights in places such as Turkey, California, Egypt, Namibia, etc.

== Gallery of models ==
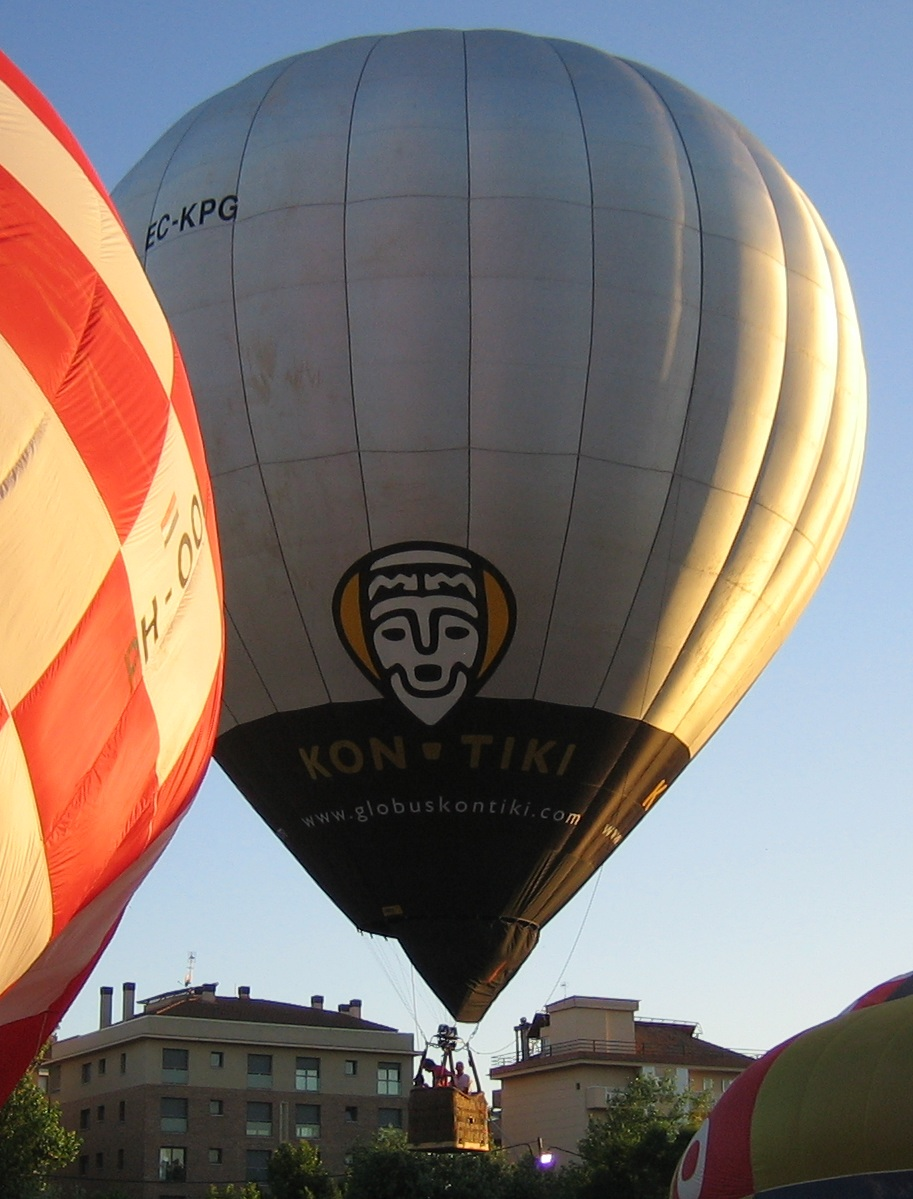
Ultramagic M-77 (volume of 2.200 m³, for 3 or 4 persons)

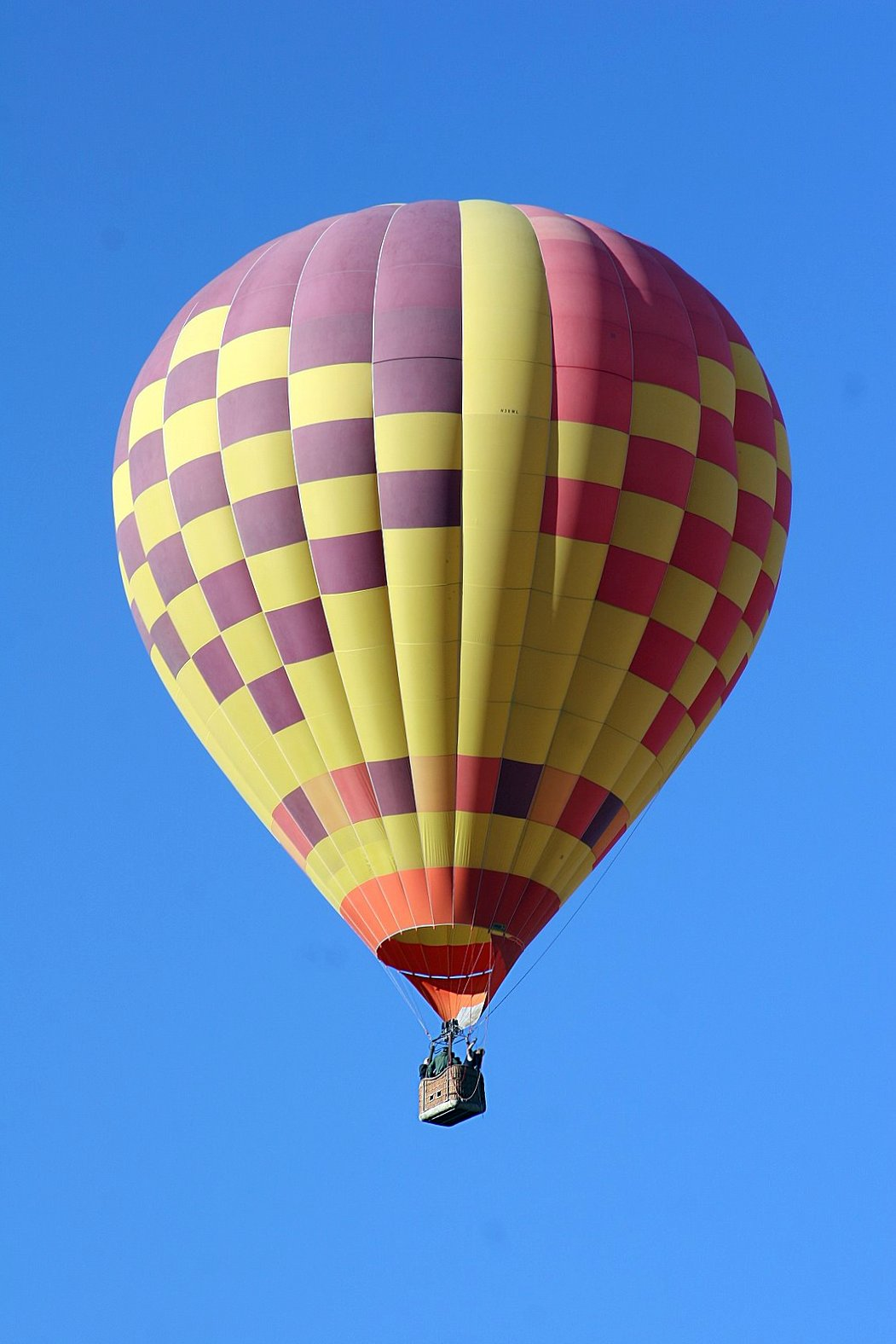
Ultramagic M-105 (3.000 m³, 5 persons), registered in the United States

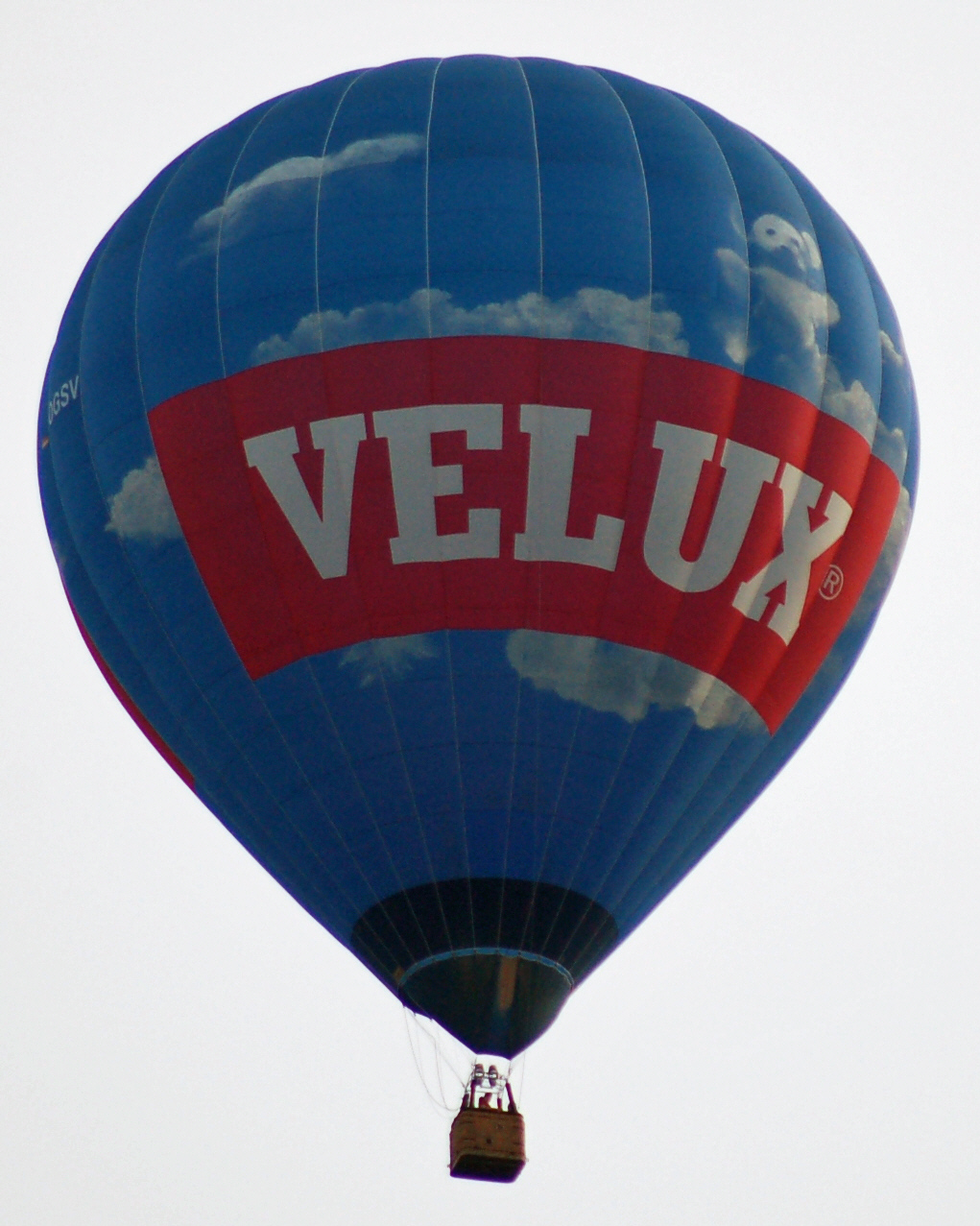
Ultramagic M-120 (3.400 m³, 5 or 6 persons)

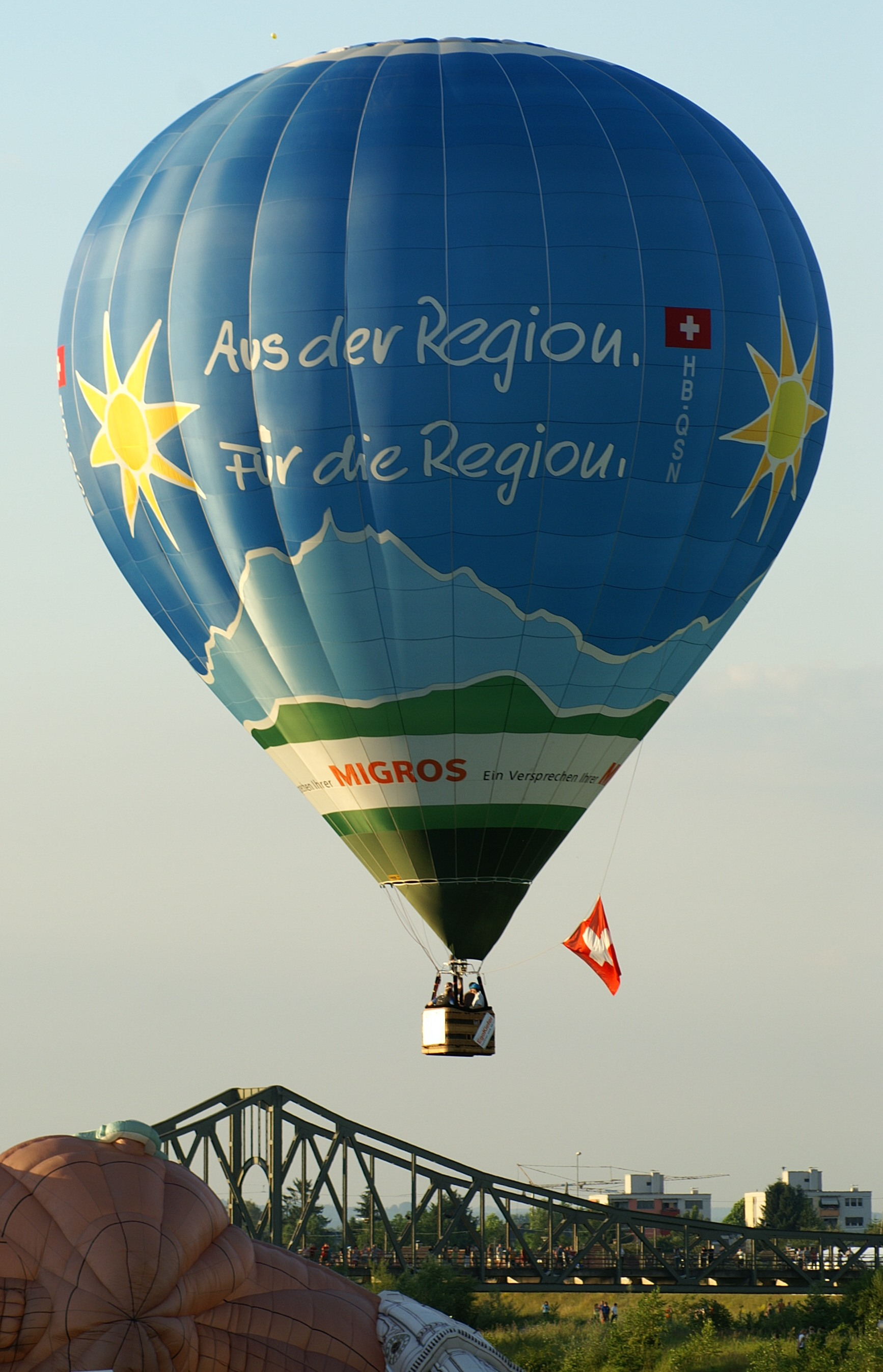
Ultramagic M-130 (3.680 m³, 6 persons), registered in Switzerland

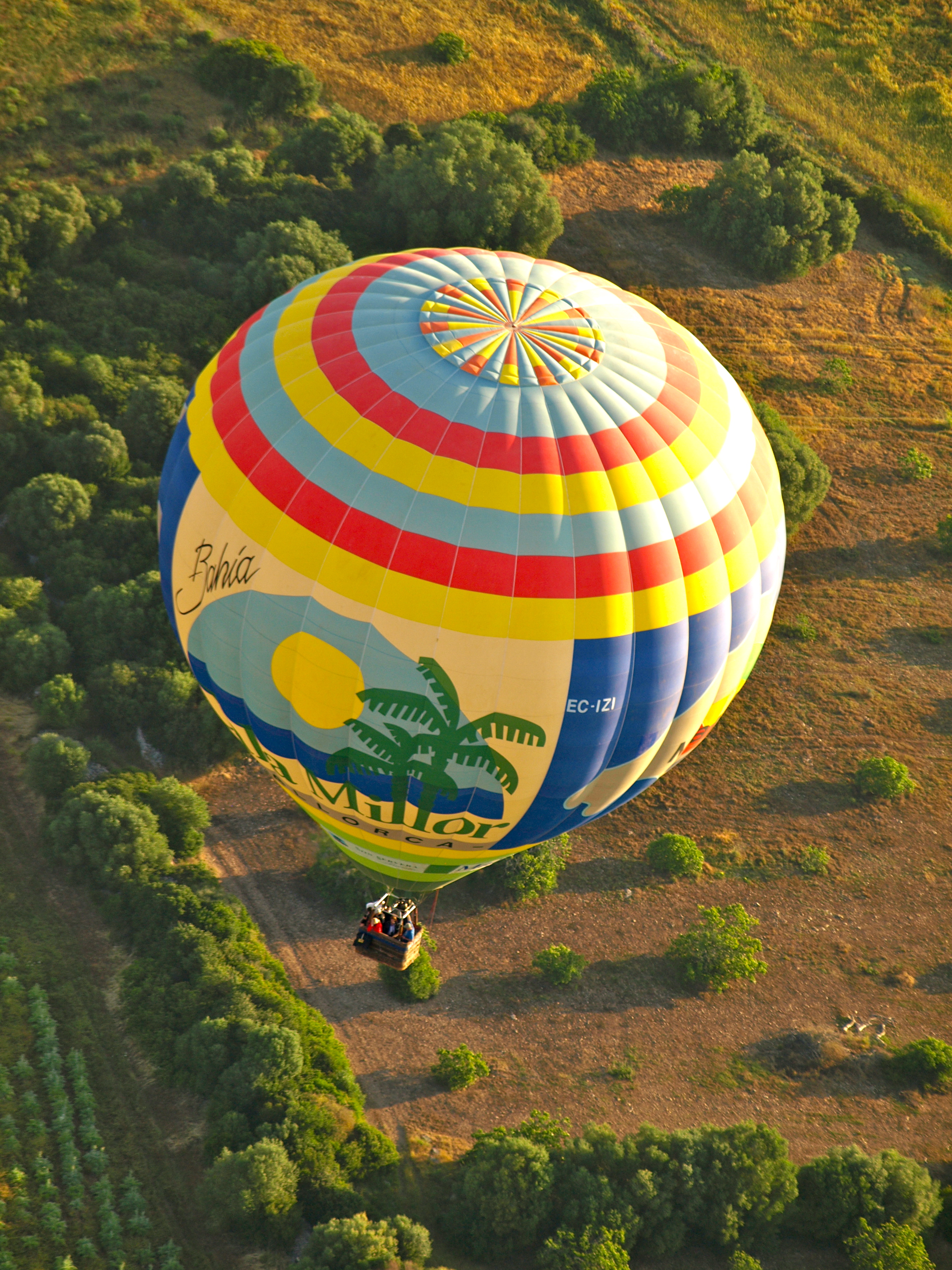
Ultramagic N-180 (5.100 m³, 9 persons)

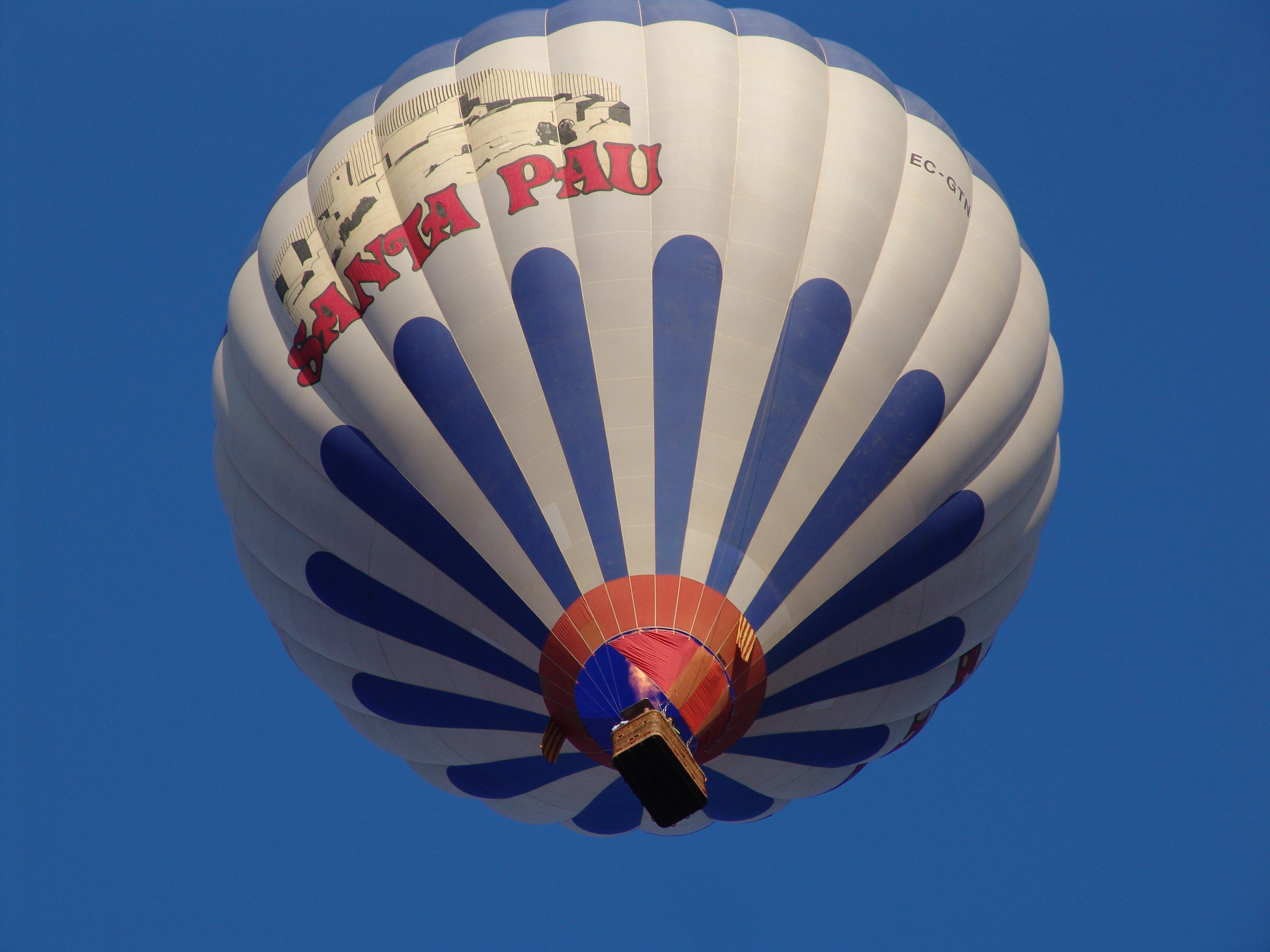
Ultramagic N-210 (6,000 m³, 11 persons)

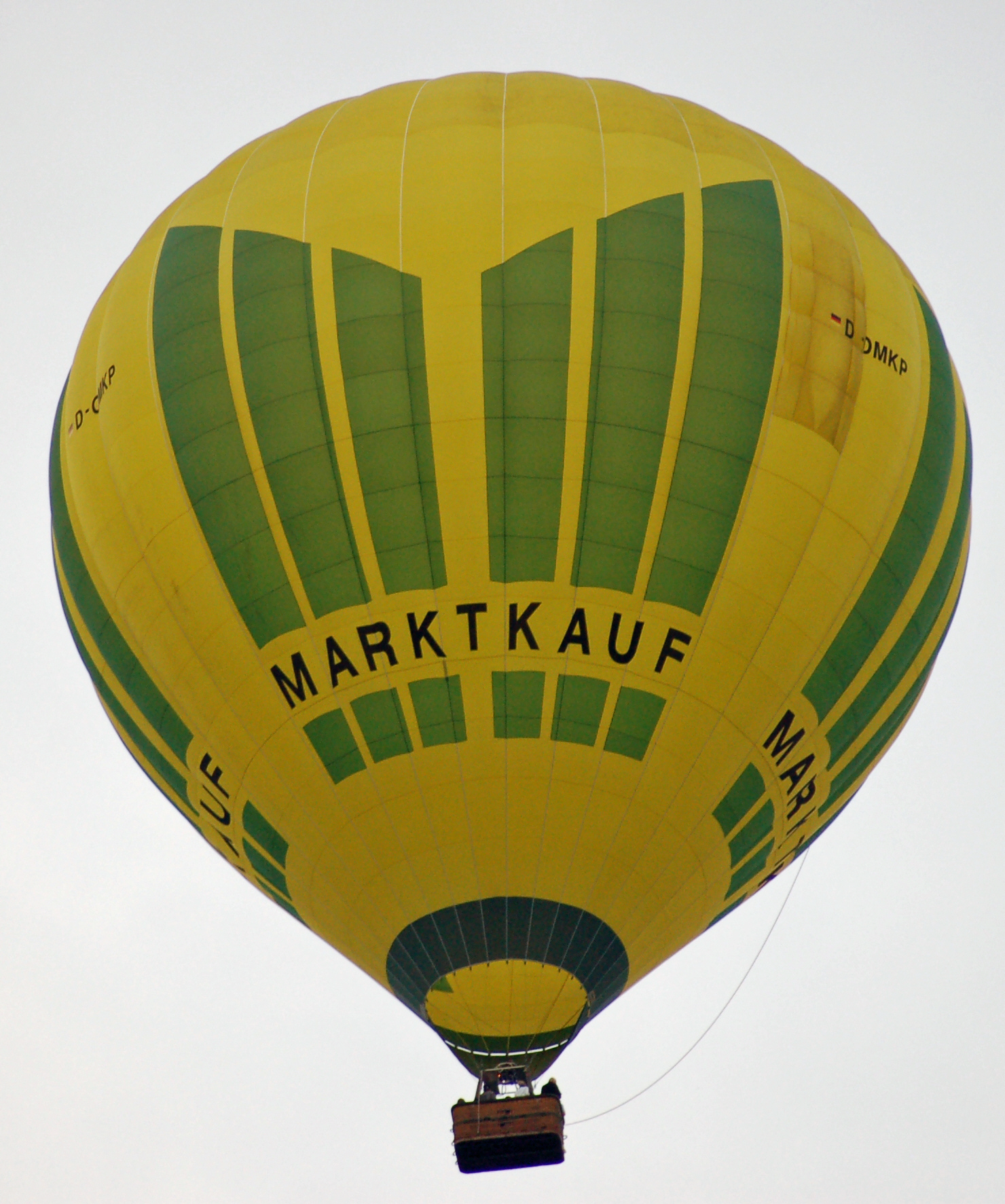
Ultramagic N-210 (6,000 m³, 11 persons)

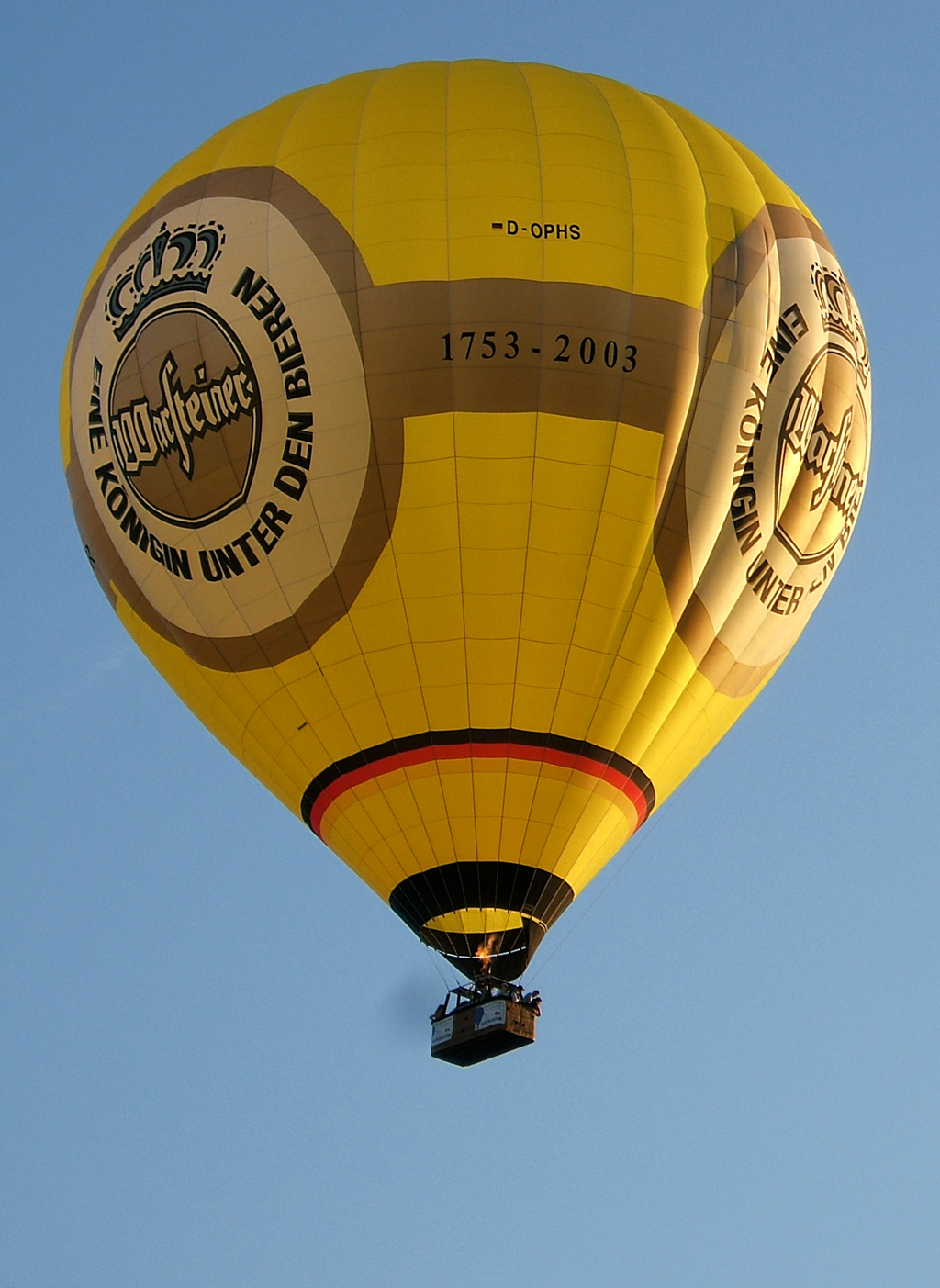
Ultramagic N-355 (10,000 m³, 20 persons)

== See also ==
- Hot air balloon
- European Balloon Festival
