= Murt =

Murt may refer to:

== Places ==
=== Albania ===
- Murth, Tirana

=== Iran ===
- Murt, Ilam (مورت)
- Murt-e Hadi, Kermanshah Province
- Murt-e Sabz, Kermanshah Province
- Murt, Khuzestan (مورت)
- Murt, Lorestan (مورت)
- Murt, Sistan and Baluchestan (مورت); a town in Sistan and Baluchestan Province

== Other uses ==
- Murt (name)
