= Fashion in Barcelona =

The history of fashion in Barcelona began in the early 20th century with the rise of the textile industry and spans through today with its current concentration on fast fashion. With various popular fashion districts and a handful of notable fashion events each year, Barcelona has proven itself as a major city for fashion. According to the Global Language Monitor, which ranks world fashion capitals, Barcelona ranks as #5. Today, more fashion capitals exist than the original “Big Four” of London, Paris, Milan, and New York. Although the “Big Four” remain the most elite, other cities have developed into smaller fashion centers.

== History of fashion in Barcelona ==
=== Early 20th century ===
The beginning of Barcelona as a capital for fashion can be traced back to the start of the 20th century when Barcelona's prosperous textile industry allowed the city's designers to produce some of the finest garments of the day. Various designers contributed to Barcelona's rise as a fashion capital including French haute couture designer Jeanne Lanvin who first learned the art of dressmaking in the Catalan capital city. Later, in 1929, she opened a branch of her store in Barcelona, demonstrating her belief that Barcelona was a meaningful fashion city. Another notable development for fashion in Barcelona came with Pedro Rodriguez who opened his first store, a Parisian-style salon, in Barcelona in 1919. Further, one of the most important events of the early 20th century in relation to Barcelona's growth as a fashion capital includes the Barcelona International Exposition of 1929 where the world-famous designer Cristóbal Balenciaga first established himself.

Rodriguez and Balenciaga would continue to become the leading Spanish fashion designers of their time. Additionally, in the 1920s multiple textile warehouses emerged including Santa Eulàlia, El Dique Flotante and La física, offering haute couture pieces. The combination of Barcelona's link to Paris, the strong Catalan textile industry, and the local embroidery industries lent to Barcelona's emergence as a noteworthy city of fashion.

=== Mid 20th century ===
During the Second Republic (1931–1936), Barcelona hosted several fashion shows, but the Spanish Civil War (1936–1939) stopped all fashion development in Barcelona. After the war, the growth of the fashion industry resumed. In the 1940s the “Cinco Grandes” (Pedro Rodriguez, Manuel Pertegaz, Asunción Bastida, Santa Eulalia and El Dique Flotante) appeared in the world of fashion. This group was able to gain support from Francisco Franco’s military dictatorship that was interested in Spanish exports. This allowed Catalan fashion to continue to develop.

=== Late 20th century ===
In 1963, Spanish textile manufacturers and clothing companies created the Moda del Sol union under the leadership of designer José María Fillol in order to present new, innovative textiles in the form of clothing. From 1967 to 1974, Vogue devoted 17 pages to Moda del Sol twice per year, helping Catalan designers to become internationally recognized. In line with the style of “Moda del Sol” came the rise of prêt-à-porter, or ready-to-wear, fashion in the place of haute couture during the 1960s. Early designers who took part in this initiative in Barcelona include Santa Eulàlia, Sant Patrick, Margarita Nuez, and Marisol Bofill. Notable prêt-à-porter designers of the 1970s include Toni Miró and Antonio Balado.

The end of 20th century brought the beginning of various fast fashion chains. Fast fashion refers to designs that quickly move from the runway to stores at affordable prices. The first Zara opened in La Coruña, Galicia, Spain (under the name of “Zorba”) in 1975 and expanded throughout Spain until its first international store opened in Porto, Portugal in 1988. In the 1990s, Zara's parent company, Inditex, bought Barcelona brands Massimo Dutti and Stradivarius. Additionally, Barcelona-born Mango opened its first store on Passeig de Gràcia in 1984. Throughout the end of the century, Barcelona continued to grow as a fashion capital and various fashion franchises continued to open stores in the Catalan capital city.

=== 21st century ===
In the 21st century, Barcelona has emerged as one of the top 10 fashion capitals in the world, ranking as #5 in 2015 according to the Global Language Monitor. In 2014, the region in which Barcelona is located, Catalonia, was home to 1,700 fashion businesses that employed 100,000 people and generated 13 billion euros (about US$13.8 billion) per year.

== Barcelona fashion districts ==
=== Passeig de Gràcia ===
This neighborhood is Barcelona's most famous fashion district that offers luxury brands including Chanel, Valentino, Hermes, and Burberry. It also includes the mass-market stores such as Zara, Mango, H&M, and Desigual. Additionally, the Spanish luxury label, Loewe, can also be found in Passeig de Gràcia. With decorative buildings designed by the famous modernist artists Antoni Gaudí, Josep Puig i Cadafalch, and Lluís Domènech i Montaner lining the streets of Passeig de Gràcia, tourists and locals alike can shop near Barcelona's most iconic architecture.

=== Portal de L’Angel ===
Located off of Plaça de Catalunya, Portal de L’Angel is the second largest shopping district, after Passeig de Gràcia, and provides shoppers with a large number of department stores. El Corte Inglés, Zara, Bershka, Pull&Bear, Mango, and other fashion franchises can be found here.

=== La Rambla de Catalunya ===
This shopping area runs parallel to Passeig de Gràcia and offers a different range of options. La Rambla is home primarily to independent stores and has been described as more "bourgeois" than Passeig de Gràcia. With a long history as one of Barcelona's main market areas, La Rambla combines shopping and cultural activities, reflecting the city's historical character and contemporary style. La Rambla is also known for pickpocketing.

== Barcelona fashion events ==
=== 080 Barcelona ===
080 Barcelona is Barcelona's bi-annual Fashion Week in which designers display their most recent collections to the public. Over the course of five days, there are 40 fashion parades that give both buyers and the general public the opportunity to see the latest trends. Currently, internationalization is at the focus of the event in order to present local designers to the world and to ensure Barcelona remains a top city for fashion. 080 gives Barcelona the opportunity to show its culture of fashion to the world.

=== TSNB Barcelona ===
The Shopping Night Barcelona (TSNB), founded in 2010, offers shoppers the opportunity to stay out until 1:00am to shop in the Passeig de Gràcia neighborhood at the beginning of December. Many stores offer promotions and sales aimed at attracting holiday shoppers. Additionally, traffic is blocked off so that shoppers can easily move through the streets, enjoying the stores as well as the festive events such as street food booths, local concerts, and other performances. In 2015, TSNB brought 85,000 shoppers to Passeig de Gràcia.

=== Barcelona Fashion Summit ===
Founded in 2013, Barcelona Fashion Summit offers an annual meeting point that brings together Spanish fashion executives to learn and discuss trends in the industry. The forum offers important information regarding how companies can grow and succeed in the world of fashion. Regarded as the leading event for fashion professionals in Barcelona, Barcelona Fashion Summit provides attendees with conferences, round tables, and networking events crucial for those that want to advance in the industry.

== Fashion brands from Barcelona ==
Barcelona's long history of innovation lends itself to a wide selection of Barcelona-born fashion brands. From the Mango of 1984 to the more recent Bimba Lola of 2006, Barcelona is a city that breeds design.

- Mango
- Tous
- Paloma Wool
- VIKTRA
- Ailanto
- Sita Murt
- Lupo Barcelona
- Great Tomorrow Clothing
- Desigual
