= Murth =

Murth may refer to:

- Murth, Tirana, Albania
- Murth The Man-O-Script, Dutch rapper and comedian
