= The Brandery =

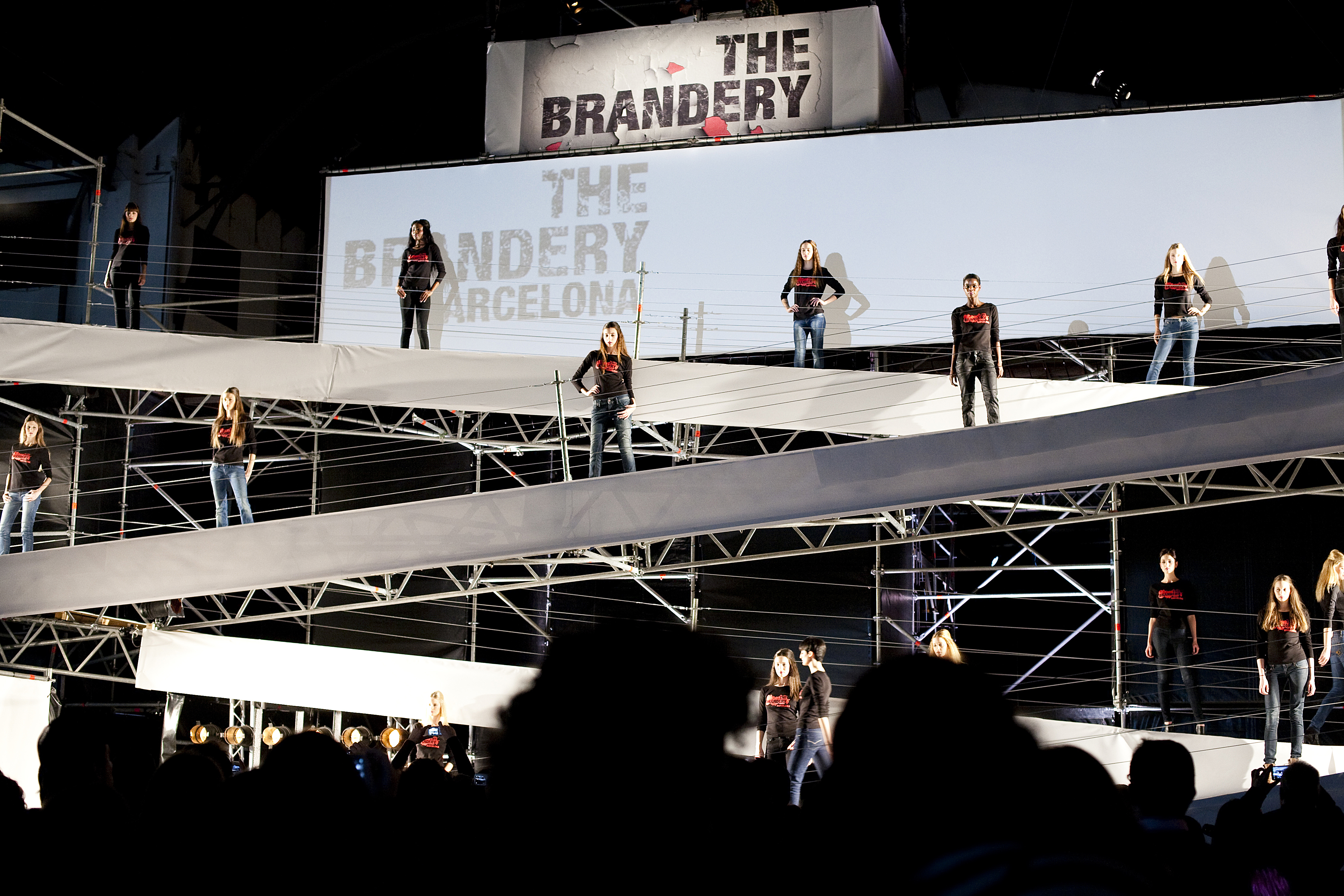
Catwalk at The Brandery, January 2011

The Brandery was an urban fashion show, organized from 2009 to 2012 by Fira de Barcelona and held twice a year, in summer and winter. The first edition was held in July 2009 at the Montjuïc exhibition site in Barcelona and was initially addressed exclusively to professional visitors.

== History ==
The first edition had 113 participating brands. The third edition, from June 28 to June 30, 2010, had 215 brands and 17.000 visitors, with 25% of them coming from outside Spain. The fourth edition, in January 2011, hosted buyers such as the department stores El Corte Inglés, John Lewis, La Rinascente and Galeries Lafayette, and included “Windows on the Move”, a window-dressing competition involving more than 100 top stores in Barcelona, distributed across the city center.

The fifth edition, in July 2011, was inaugurated by Xavier Trias, mayor of Barcelona, and by Miquel Serrano, manager of the show. This edition included a new section named Brandtown, which was open to non-professional visitors, and included a Fitting Room meeting inside the rooms of a hotel, with bloggers, trendsetters, specialized media and fashion and design lovers.

In December 2012, The Brandery announced that it would be converted into an annual show held as part of the Mobile World Festival, a fashion, music and technology event to be launched in September 2013 by the Mobile World Congress. In July 2013, the organizers postponed the launch of the Mobile World Festival to September 2014.

Brands and designers who have participated at the show include Desigual, Custo Barcelona, Munich, Armand Basi, Buff, Sita Murt, Camper, le Coq Sportif, Kaporal, North Sail and Lyle & Scott. The summer 2011 edition presented proposals from Stella McCartney, Vivienne Westwood, Blumarine, Iceberg, Alberta Ferretti, Moschino, Frankie Morello, Roberto Cavalli and Parah. Magazines such as Elle, Cosmopolitan and Vogue have also been present at the show.

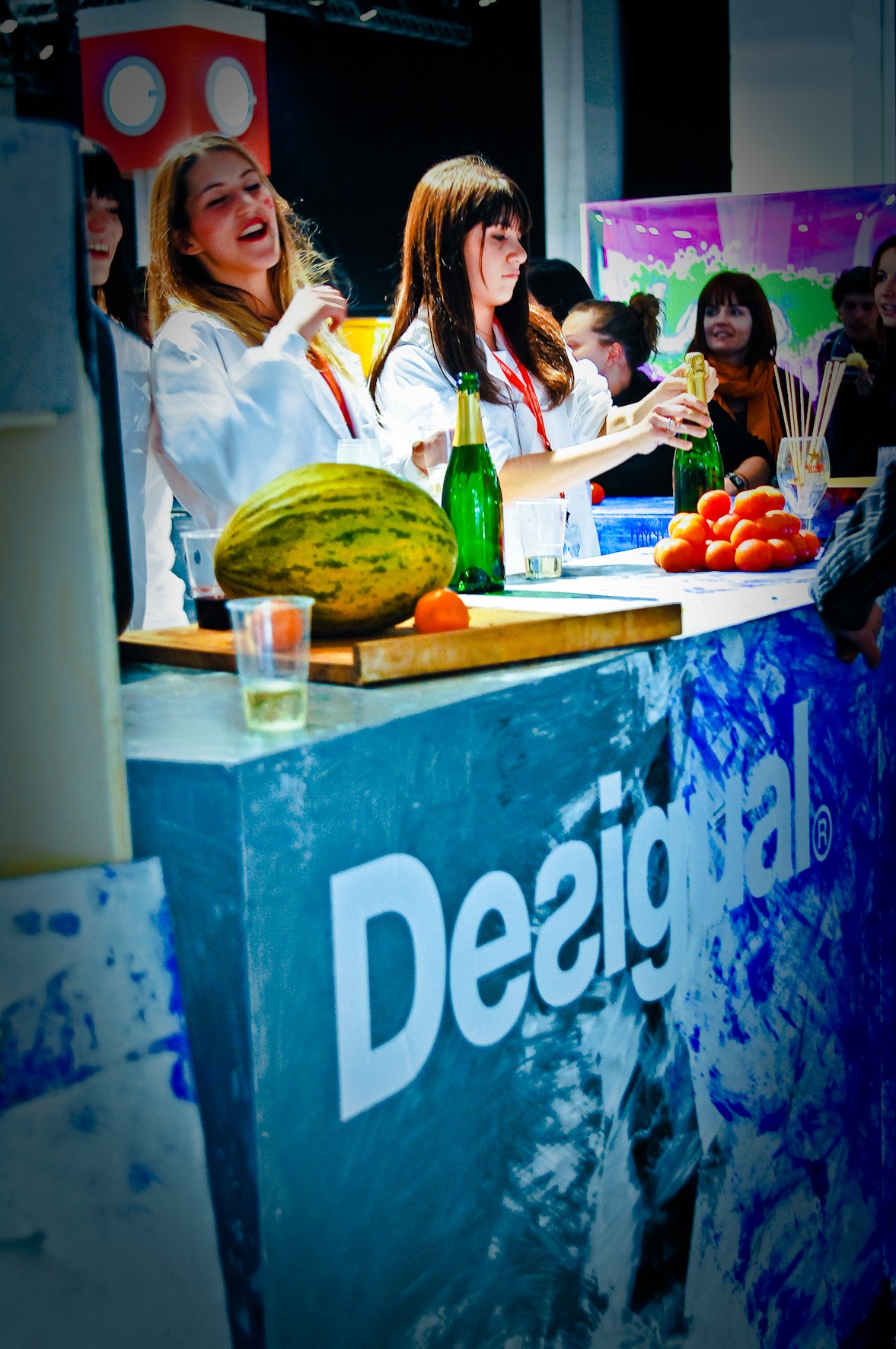
Desigual, January 2010

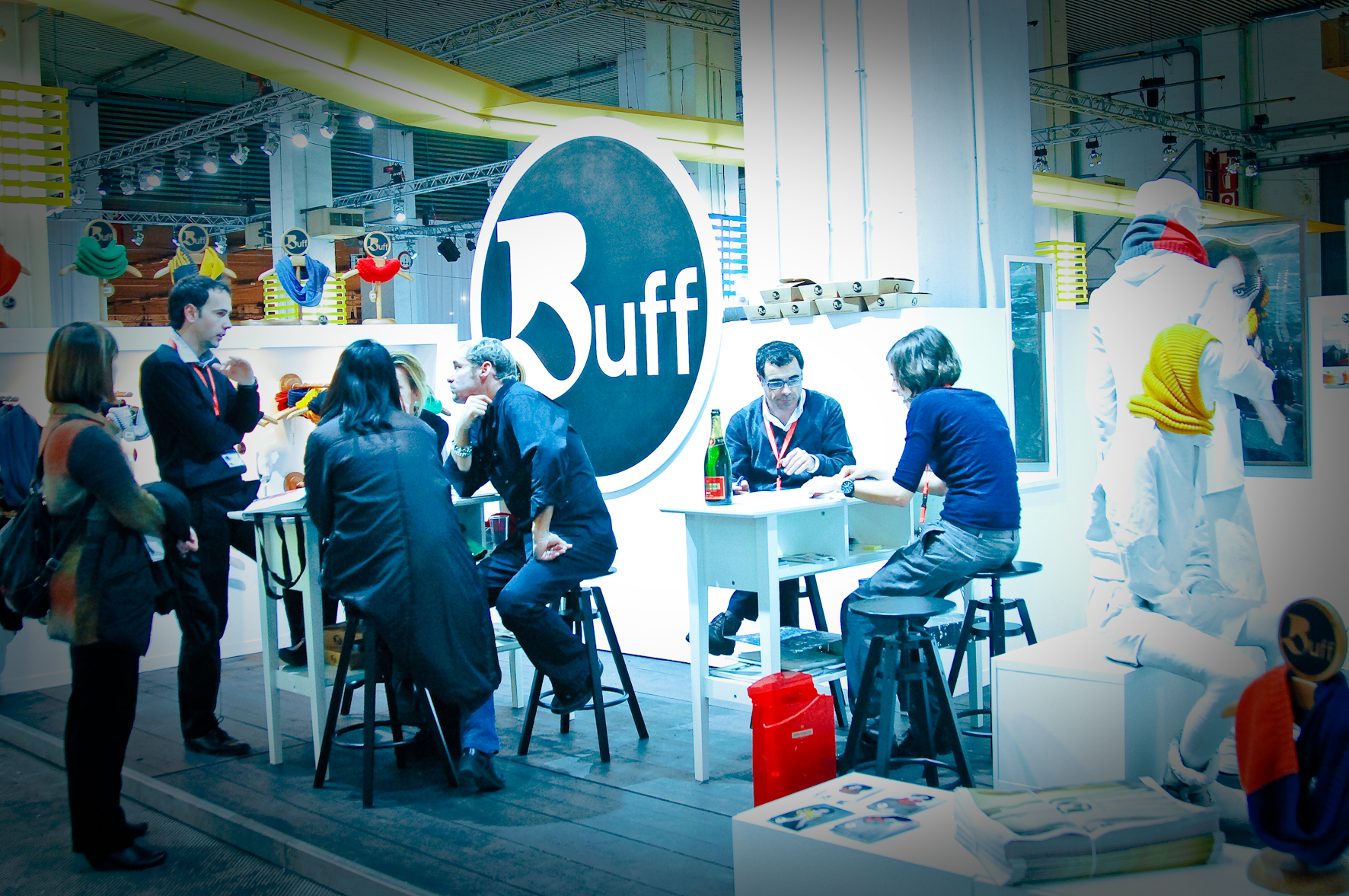
Buff (headgear), January 2010

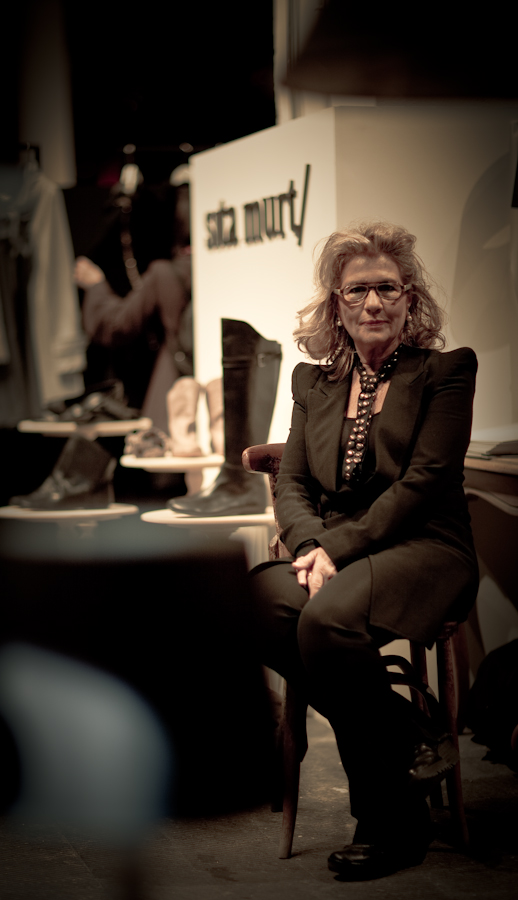
Sita Murt, January 2010

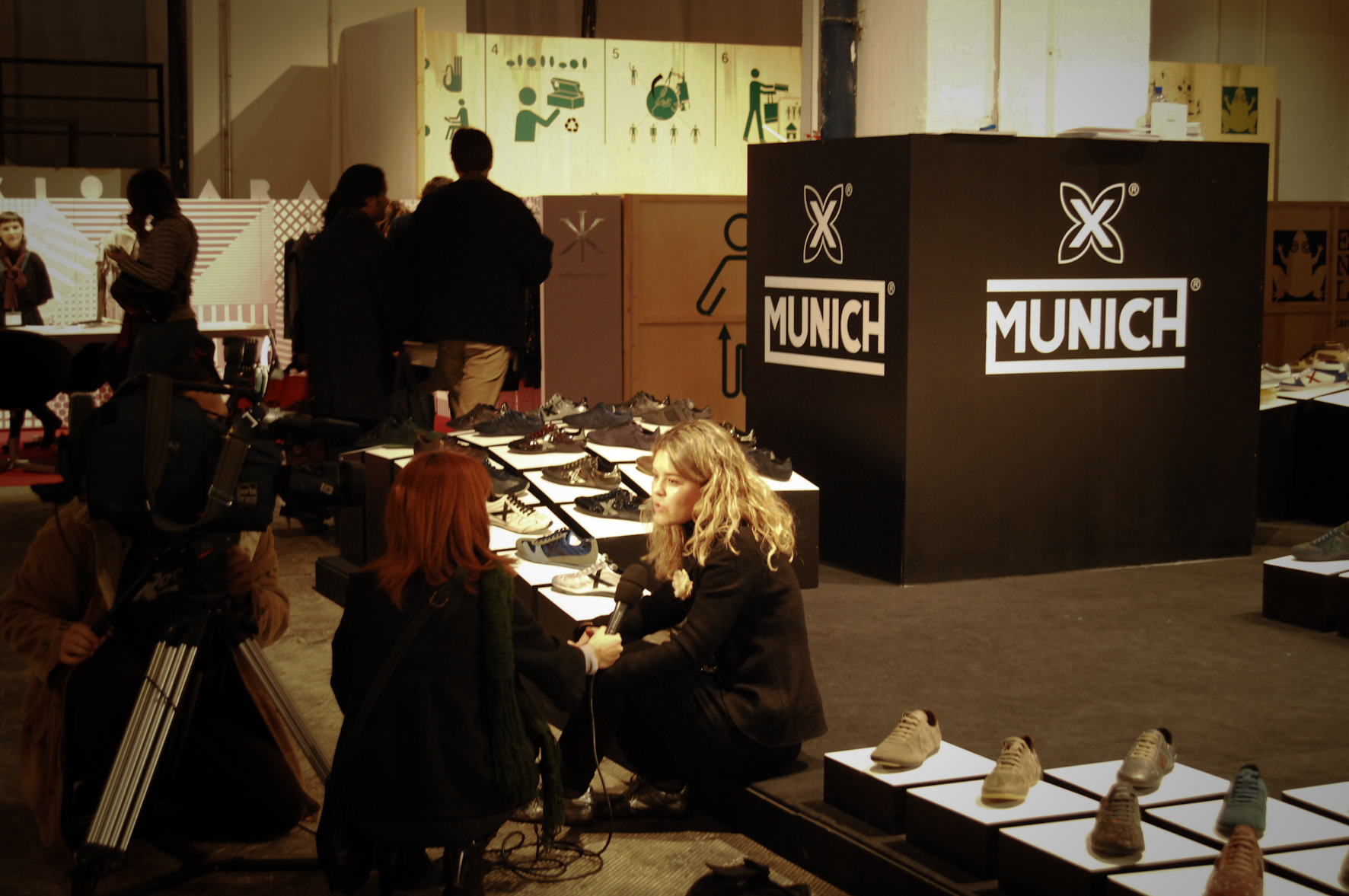
Munich (sport shoes), January 2010

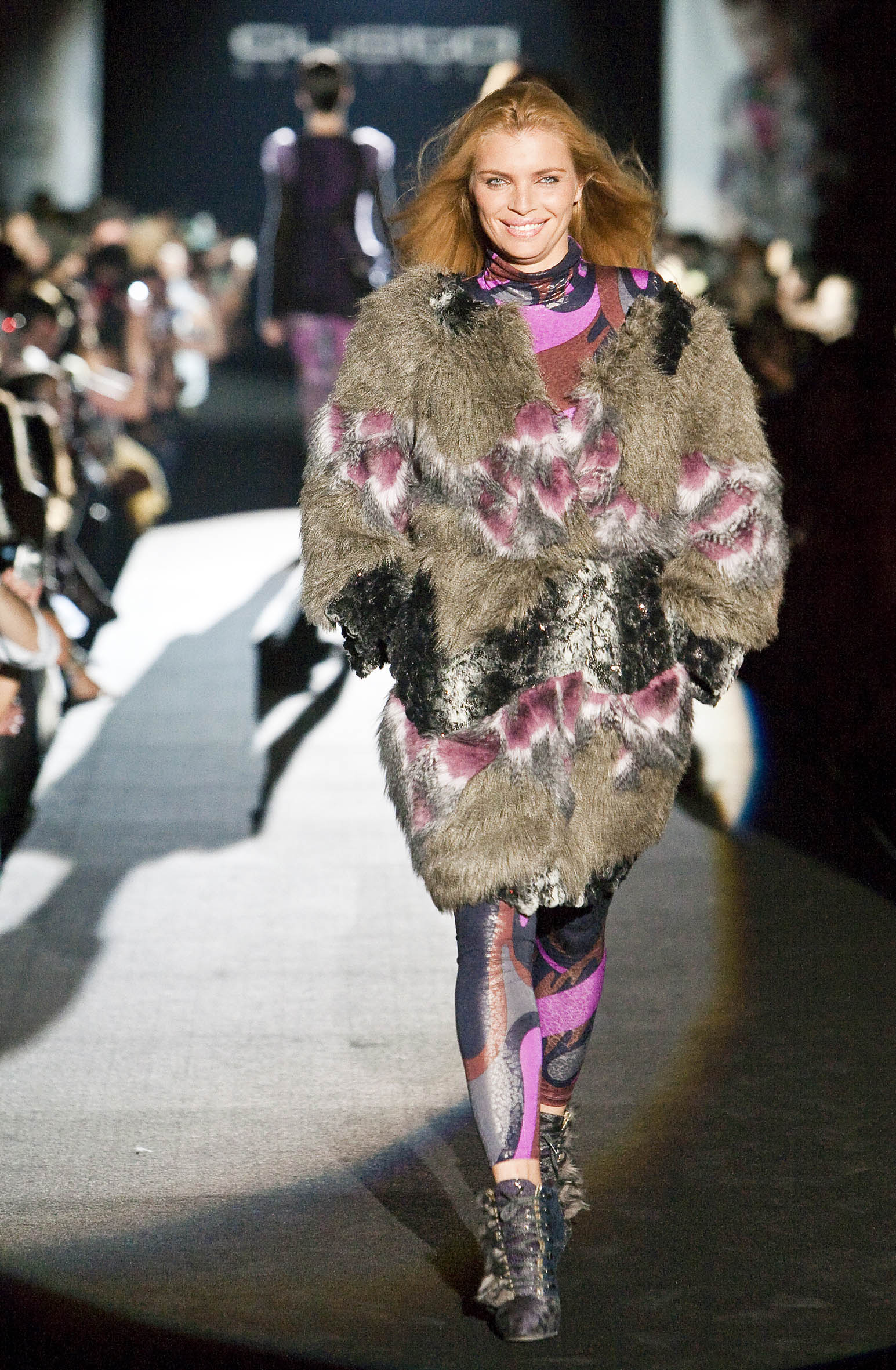
Custo Barcelona and Esther Cañadas catwalk model (June, 2010)

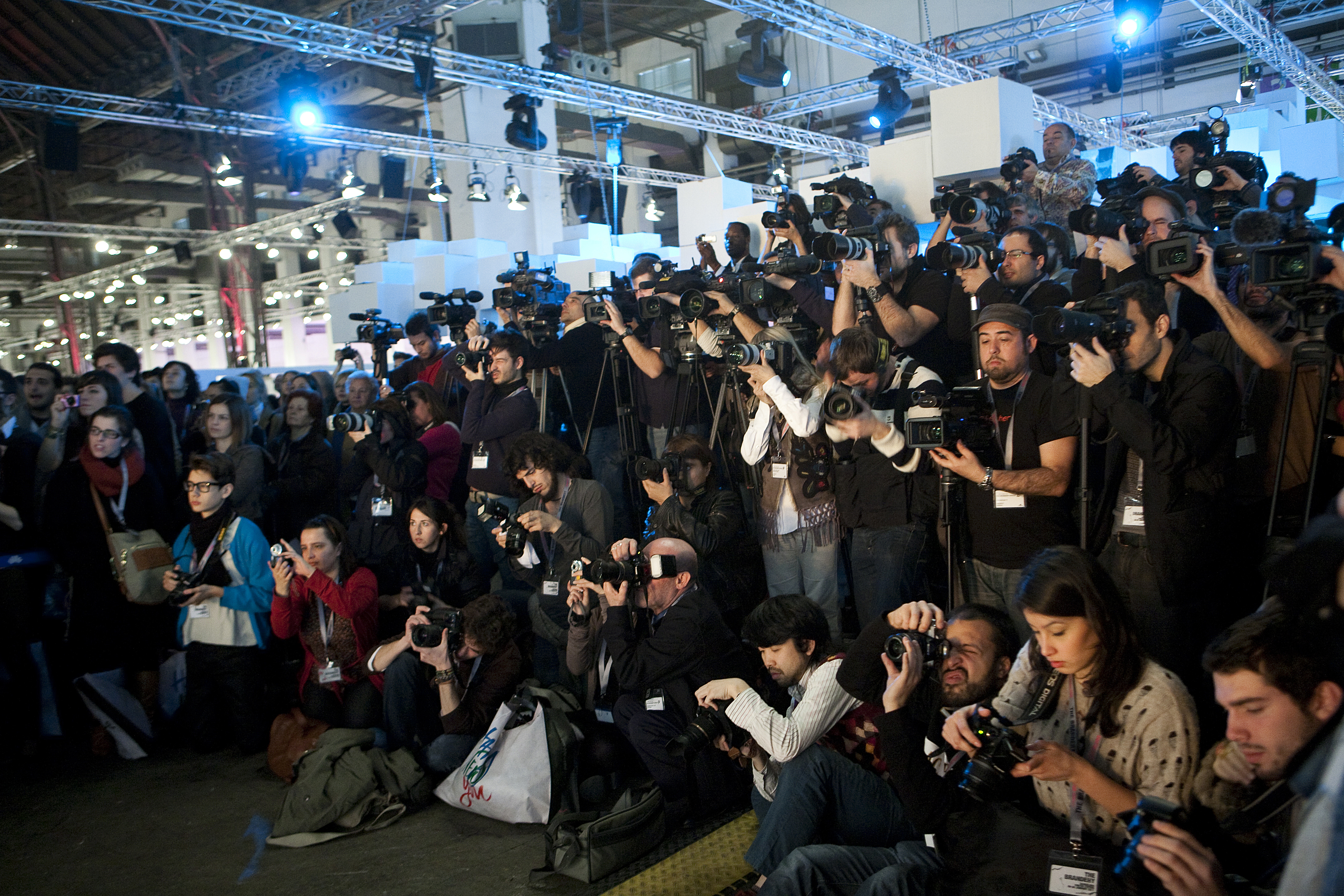
Catwalk photographers (January 2011)
