= Lyle & Scott =

Scottish sportswear fashion brand

Lyle & Scott Limited
- Trade name: Lyle & Scott
- Type: Clothing
- Industry: Fashion
- Founded: 1874 in Hawick, Roxburghshire, Scotland
- Area served: Worldwide
- Key people: Philip Oldham (CEO)
- Products: Clothing, footwear, accessories
- Website: www.lyleandscott.com

Lyle & Scott Limited, trading as Lyle & Scott, is a Scottish luxury fashion and knitwear brand well known historically for its golfing knitwear. Based in Hawick in the Scottish Borders area of Scotland, the brand designs, manufactures and markets knitwear and in the 21st century has become increasingly popular for its clothing such as t-shirts, polo shirts, tracksuits and loungewear amongst younger and middle aged customers.

Founded in 1874, the brand has primarily focused on golfing attire for much of its history, sported by high-profile golfers, and awarded a Royal Warrant of appointment by Charles III (then Duke of Edinburgh) in 1975. Since 2003, the brand has widened its appeal to include youth and urban markets, alongside its more traditional golfing attire.

== History ==
=== Formation, 1874–2001 ===
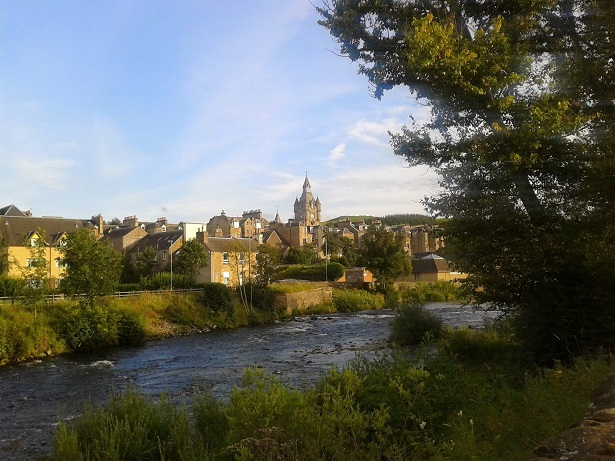
Lyle & Scott was established in the Scottish town of Hawick in 1874

Lyle & Scott was founded in 1874 in the Scottish town of Hawick by William Lyle and Walter Scott with an £800 loan. The 125 year old Lyle & Scott archive of designers includes designs by Christian Dior and Michael Kors.

The brand introduced its golf range in 1967, which was quickly adopted by top golfers such as Tony Jacklin, Gary Player and Greg Norman as well as golfing enthusiasts such as Bob Hope, Gareth Ford and Ronnie Corbett, with the latter usually sporting a Lyle & Scott jumper during his monologues on The Two Ronnies. Other patrons include Cristiano Ronaldo. Lyle and Scott were granted a Royal Warrant of appointment by The Duke of Edinburgh in 1975.

=== 21st century, 2001–present ===
==== Acquisition ====
In 2001, Lyle & Scott was acquired and had its headquarters moved to London. The brand's rejuvenation can be traced to 2003 with the launch of its ‘Vintage’ collection and refreshed ‘Golden Eagle’ logo design by London Designer, Alan Price. It was taken up by a selection of youth TV presenters and indie bands including the Arctic Monkeys. In 2005 following the success of the Vintage range, Lyle & Scott’s first stand-alone store opened in London’s Covent Garden on King Street.

==== Heritage collection ====
In 2007, the Lyle & Scott Heritage collection was launched, with a more discrete, tonal logo. In early 2009 Lyle & Scott launched the ‘Club’ collection, a golf line aimed at the young golfer. 2009 also saw the launch of the Lyle & Scott e-commerce website, which offers the Lyle & Scott collections to purchase. In January 2011, the firm participated at The Brandery fashion show in Barcelona.

==== 150th anniversary ====
In 2023, ahead of the brand's 150th anniversary, Lyle and Scott opened a new centre of "operational excellence" in Selkirk, paying tribute to the brand's origins and history in the Scottish Borders. Chief Executive of the company, Philip Oldham, said that "our [Lyle and Scott] history will always be steeped in the Scottish borders. It made absolute sense to us to put further significant investment in Scotland to help drive the next chapter of Lyle & Scott’s international growth". The new centre in Selkirk has been established in order to support the company with the internal processes of the company and supporting the brand’s “ambitious growth strategies”. The centre in Selkirk deals with sales and logistical administration, sales processing, data capture, and stockist support. The company has committed to further expansion of the Lyle and Scott brand and business in Scotland in the future.

== Products ==
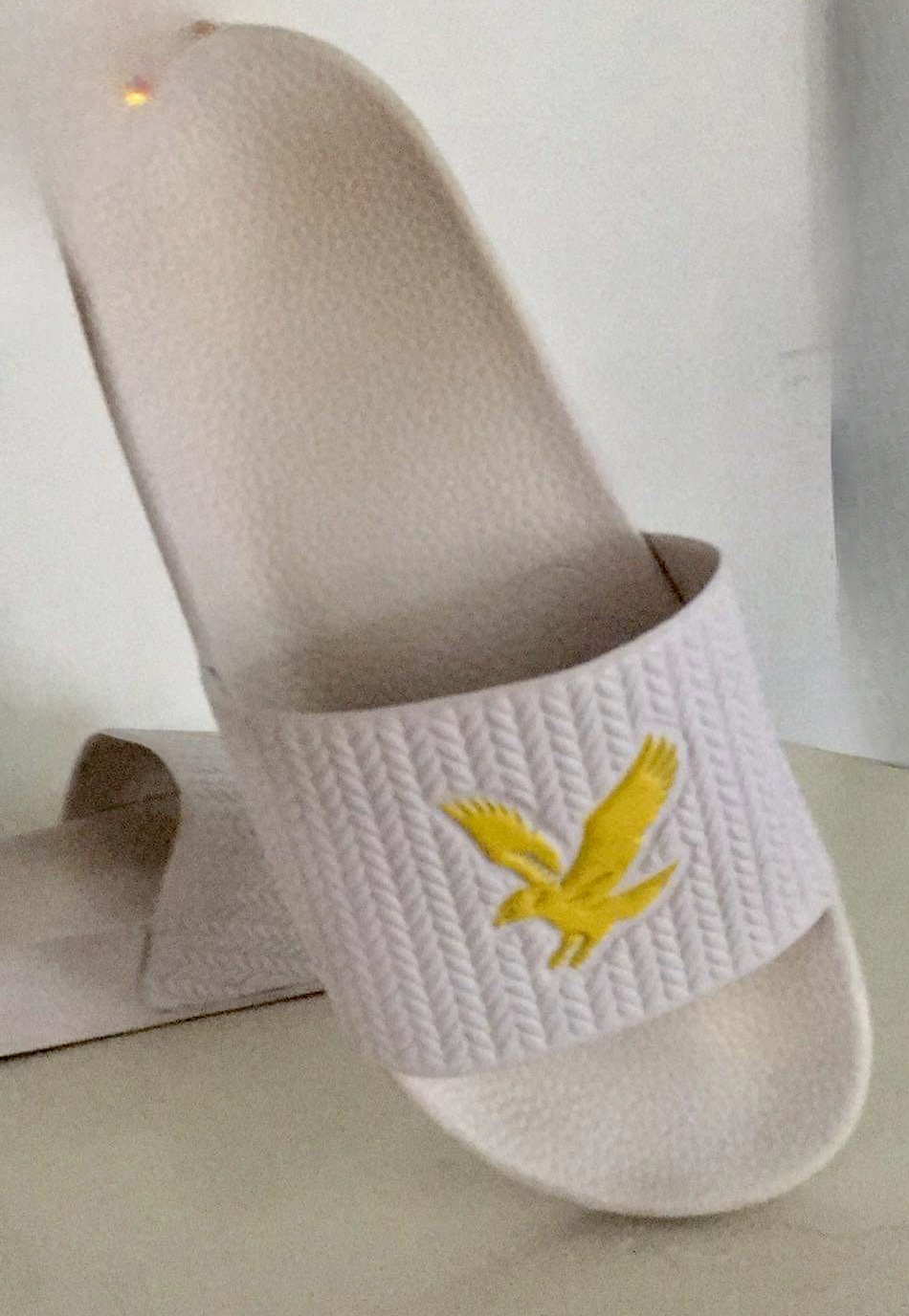
A pair of Lyle and Scott sliders

=== Origins ===
Lyle and Scott was originally founded with the intention to create high quality knitted underwear. The company launched their first knitwear collection in 1920 and was designed to appeal to young, working men. After a period of growth and success, the Lyle and Scott brand caught the attention of a number of other companies, notably Christian Dior in 1954, who wished to collaborate with Lyle and Scott.

=== Golf ===
The company ventured into the golf wear market in 1960, with the brand's iconic 'Golden Eagle' logo paying tribute to Gleneagles in Scotland and its association with golf. By 1970, Lyle and Scott golf wear had become the largest golf wear brand internationally, with prominent golfers such as Jack Nicklaus wearing the brand during the 1978 Open Championship. Other notable players to wear the brand during their careers include Arnold Palmer and Gary Player. The Lyle and Scott golf wear brand continues to be popular amongst both professional and amateur golfers.

=== Popular culture ===
The brand had become popular in the 1960s and 1970s with subcultures such as Mods. The brand was popular with mods who often wore the brands knitted jumpers as statement pieces. The brand has also become synonymous with football culture (or "football casuals") in the United Kingdom. The association with football casuals began when football fans wore the brands knitted jumpers from the golf range to football match days, citing the variety of colours as a factor for fans choosing to wear the brand, including managers, such as current Wycombe Wanderers manager Michael Duff being seen regularly on matchdays sporting Lyle & Scott apparael.

By the 21st century, Lyle and Scott's main products include footwear, leisurewear such as tracksuits, t-shirts, joggers, bucket hat, bags, underwear, socks, loungewear, shorts, shirts, swimwear, coats, jackets, hoodies and sweatshirts. These products are available in ranges for men, women and children.

== Notable patrons ==
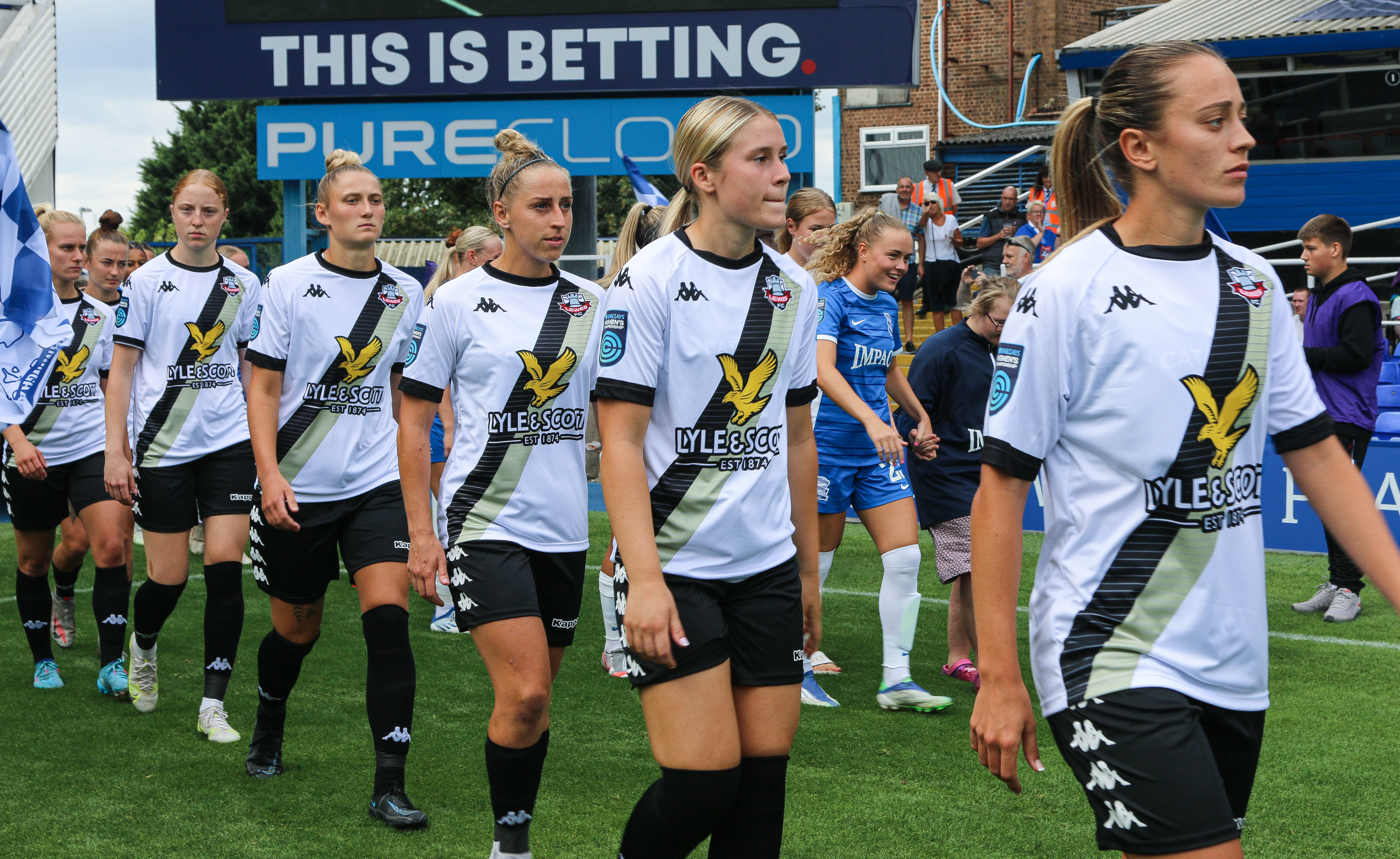
Lyle and Scott is the main shirt sponsor of Lewes FC

Notable patrons include the Duke of Edinburgh, Prince Philip, Ronnie Corbett and musicians like the Arctic Monkeys, Kasabian, Pete Doherty, actor Adam Deacon as well as TV presenters Tim Lovejoy, Chris Ramsey, Simon Amstell and Holly Willoughby. Lyle and Scott has also featured in films such as The Firm and Green Street.

== Sponsorships ==
Lyle and Scott has sponsored football clubs throughout its history. In 2023, it renewed its sponsorship deal with Lewes FC. In mid–2023, it launched the Kits For Club campaign, committing to a "seven figure investment" during the first year which will see new football kits given to grassroots football clubs globally.
