= Murt (name) =

Murt is both a surname and a given name. Notable people with the name include:

- Murt Connor (born 1951), Irish Gaelic football player
- Murt Kelly, Irish Gaelic football player
- Sita Murt (1946–2014), Catalan fashion designer and businesswoman
- Tom Murt (born 1960), American politician

== Fictional characters ==
- Murt (Ninjago), character from Ninjago
