= Munich (sport shoes) =

Spanish company

- Company type: Private
- Industry: Sportswear; Sports goods
- Founded: Spain (1939)
- Founder: Lluís Berneda
- Headquarters: Capellades, Barcelona, Spain
- Area served: Worldwide
- Key people: Xavier Berneda; David Berneda
- Products: Footwear; Sportswear; Accessories
- Revenue: 52,600,000 euro (2022)
- Owner: Berneda S.A.
- Website: www.munichsports.com

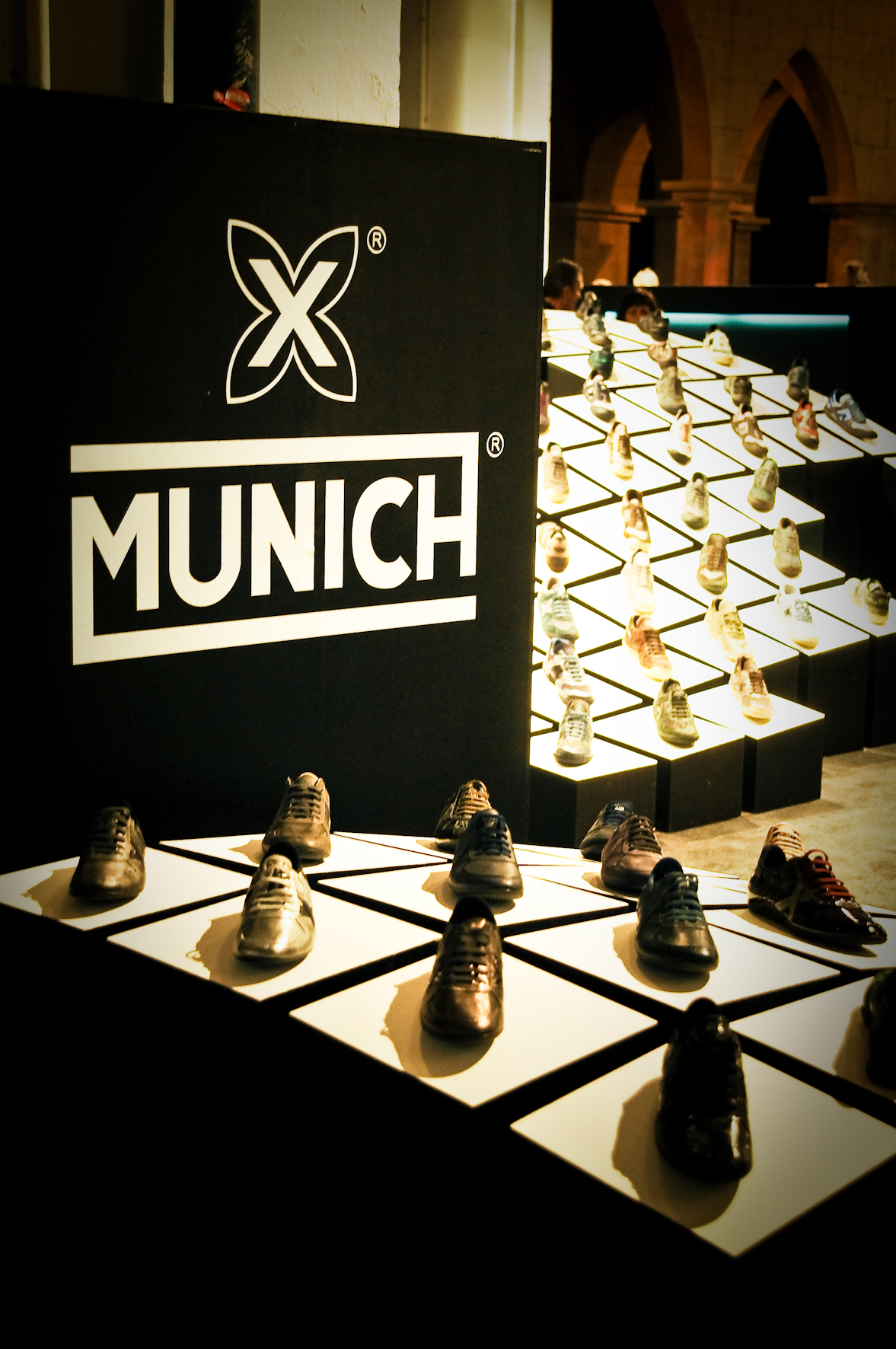
Munich at The Brandery fashion show (2010)

Munich (Catalan: [muˈnik], Spanish: [muˈnik]) is a Spanish company and brand specialized in sport and fashion shoes. The company headquarters are located in Capellades, province of Barcelona, Catalonia, Spain. Munich produces more than 850.000 pairs of shoes per year, 46% of sports type, and 54% of fashion type. The company has reached a privileged position in the field of fashion, growing in many European and Asian countries, mainly Japan. The X symbol is what makes its shoes special and identifiable.

== History ==
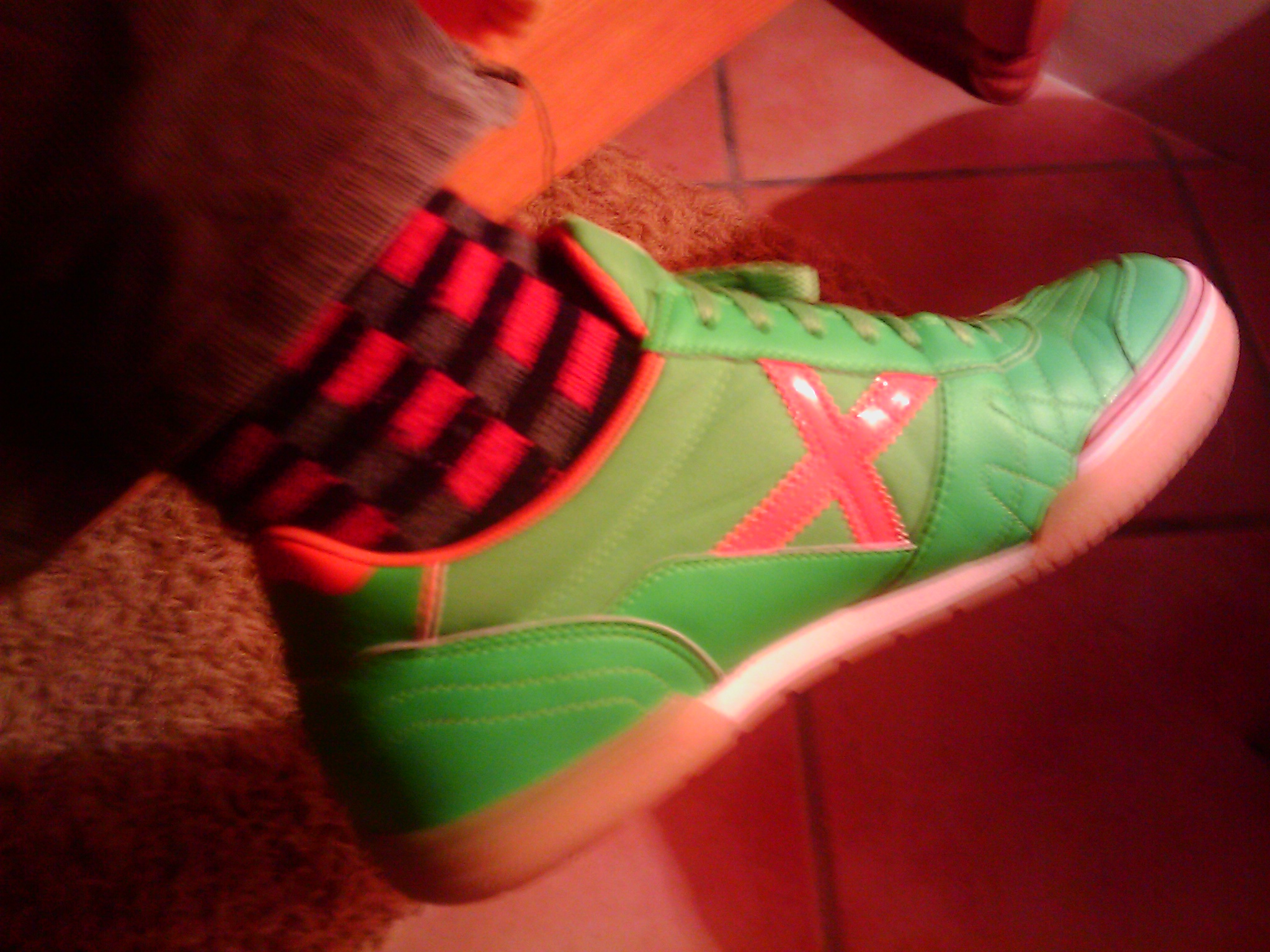
Munich shoe with the characteristic "X" symbol

The company was founded by Luís Berneda in year 1939 at the city of Sant Boi de Llobregat, with the initial company name Berneda, manufacturer of shoes for rugby football, futsal, handball and boxing, among other sports.

In 1953 the brothers Javier and Francisco, second generation of the family, entered the track and field athletics market, and were the pioneers in sports shoe making in Spain. In 1964 they added the characteristic "X" symbol and changed the company and brand name from "Berneda" to "Munich". The production remained Spanish, with design and technology influences from Italy and Germany. The brand became popular and its shoes were used by soccer players such as Ladislao Kubala and Hugo Sotil.

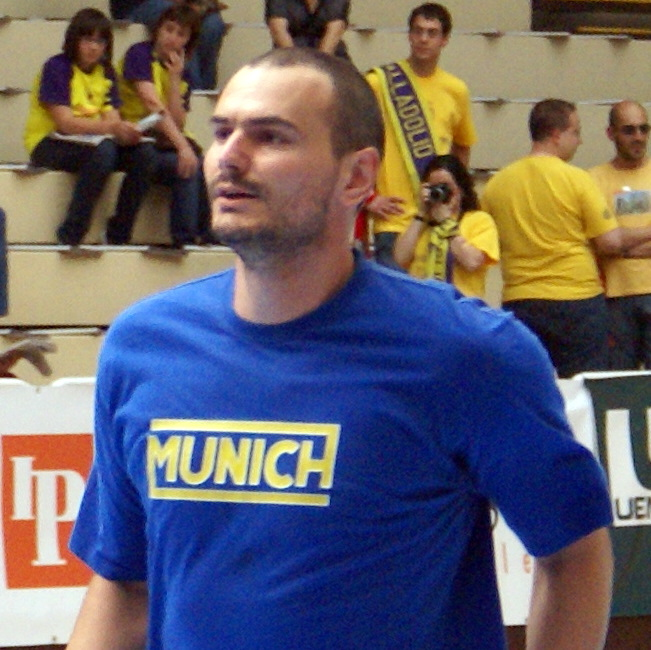
Marko Krivokapic from Club Balonmano Valladolid, sponsored by Munich

In year 1999 Xavier Berneda, marketing manager of the company, and his brother David, financial manager, both of them grandsons of the company founder, convinced the father and uncle to diversify the company and enter the field of street shoes and fashion. The Asian production, specially from China, was already a fierce competitor. Thanks to this initiative, Xavier Berneda won in year 2008 the Spanish award "Young Entrepreneur". Xavier has changed the company, entering the streetwear fashion market, keeping the company design and quality standards but opening it to new markets. Around half of the production is sold to fashion victims ready to spend from 120 to 300 euros in a pair of sports shoes. The Munich shoes are used by well known people such as John Elkann, vice-president of Fiat, Àngel Llàcer, Jesús Vázquez, Rafael Amargo, Boris Izaguirre and Manuel Fuentes.

One of the most innovative activities of the company was the website Munich My Way, launched in 2009, but meanwhile discontinued in 2022. On that site everybody was welcomed to personalize and design a pair of shoes combining many possible colors and textures, resulting in up to 333 million different combinations. The user could select the color of any of the main 9 parts of a shoe, including the sole, flap, heel and cords. When Munich received the order, the factory produced those shoes, and delivered it within 2 weeks. Munich My Way also offered the possibility of buying a different size of the right shoe compared to the left one. This is specially useful for soccer and futsal players who often require a bigger size for the shoe used to shoot.

== Awards ==
- E-COMM Award 2010, category "Sportive equipment"
