= Iceberg (fashion house) =

Italian luxury fashion design house

- Industry: Fashion
- Founded: 1974; 52 years ago, San Giovanni in Marignano
- Founder: Silvano Gerani and Giuliana Marchini
- Headquarters: San Giovanni in Marignano
- Area served: Worldwide
- Products: Clothing; Footwear; Sunglasses; Perfumes; Accessories
- Owner: Gilmar Group
- Website: www.iceberg.com

Iceberg is an Italian luxury fashion house. Founded in 1974 by designers Silvano Gerani and Giuliana Marchini, the house produces women's and men's ready-to-wear, accessories, fragrances and childrenswear.

It is part of the Gilmar Group, founded in 1962. Its headquarters are in San Giovanni in Marignano, Emilia-Romagna, Italy. The founders' son Paolo Gerani is the creative director and the brand manager.

== Overview ==
Starting as knitwear specialists, Iceberg were an early proponent of the concept of fashionable sportswear, later expanding into leatherwear and jeans.

Their products have been worn by Pamela Anderson, Paris Hilton, Lil' Flip, Lil Bill, Lil' Kim and Mischa Barton. Lil' Flip references Iceberg clothing in many of his songs.

In July 2011 the company collection was presented at the catwalk of The Brandery fashion show in Barcelona.

== See also ==
- Pinko (fashion)
