= Murt-e Sabz =

Murt-e Sabz مورت سبز
- Village
- Location within Iran
- Coordinates: 34°00′15″N 45°54′46″E
- Country: Iran
- Province: Kermanshah
- County: Gilan-e Gharb
- Bakhsh: Central
- Rural District: Vizhenan

Population (2006)
  - Total: 156
- Time zone: UTC+3:30 (IRST)
  - Summer (DST): UTC+4:30 (IRDT)

Murt-e Sabz (Persian: مورت سبز, also Romanized as Mūrt-e Sabz) is a village in Vizhenan Rural District, in the Central District of Gilan-e Gharb County, Kermanshah Province, Iran. At the 2006 census, its population was 156, in 32 families.
