= Desigual =

Spanish fashion label headquartered in Barcelona

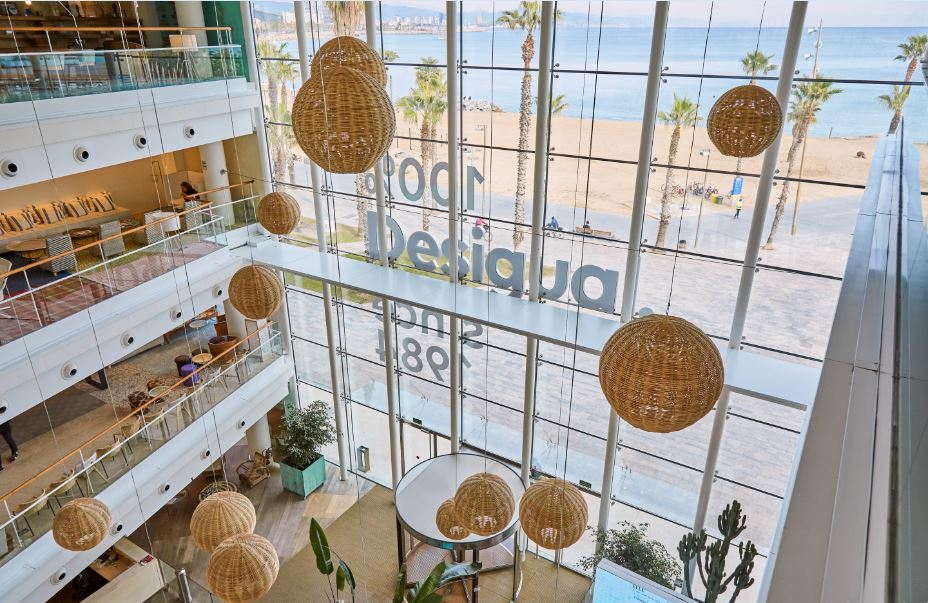
- Type: Sociedad Anónima (S.A.)
- Industry: Fashion
- Genre: Fashion brand, business, traditional company, retail firm
- Founded: Barcelona, Spain (1984)
- Founder: Thomas Meyer
- Headquarters: Barcelona, Catalonia, Spain
- Products: Clothing, accessories, shoes
- Revenue: €371 million (2021)
- Number of employees: 2,600 (2022)
- Website: www.desigual.com

Desigual (Spanish: [desiˈɣwal]); Catalan: Catalan: [dəziˈɣwal]); meaning "unequal, uneven") is a Spanish fashion label. The company was founded by Thomas Meyer in 1984, and is headquartered in Barcelona, Catalonia. The company designs and markets ready-to-wear clothing for women, men and children, as well as accessories, footwear and other lifestyle products.

Desigual is known for its distinctive creative identity, characterized by bold colors, prints, patchwork and artistic influences. Its collections have also incorporated collaborations with designers, artists, musicians, brands, and cultural figures.

As of 2025, Desigual operates in more than 100 countries through a network of directly operated stores, wholesale partners, department store concessions, e-commerce platforms and its official online store.

== History ==
In 1983, founder Thomas Meyer designed a jacket made from scraps of second-hand jeans, then known as the "Iconic Jacket". The following year, he launched the brand Desigual. The idea of the name came from Spanish filmmaker Isabel Coixet. In 1986, the company opened its first own store in the harbor of Ibiza and included its first logo – a graphical representation of a naked man and woman holding hands – designed by Peret.

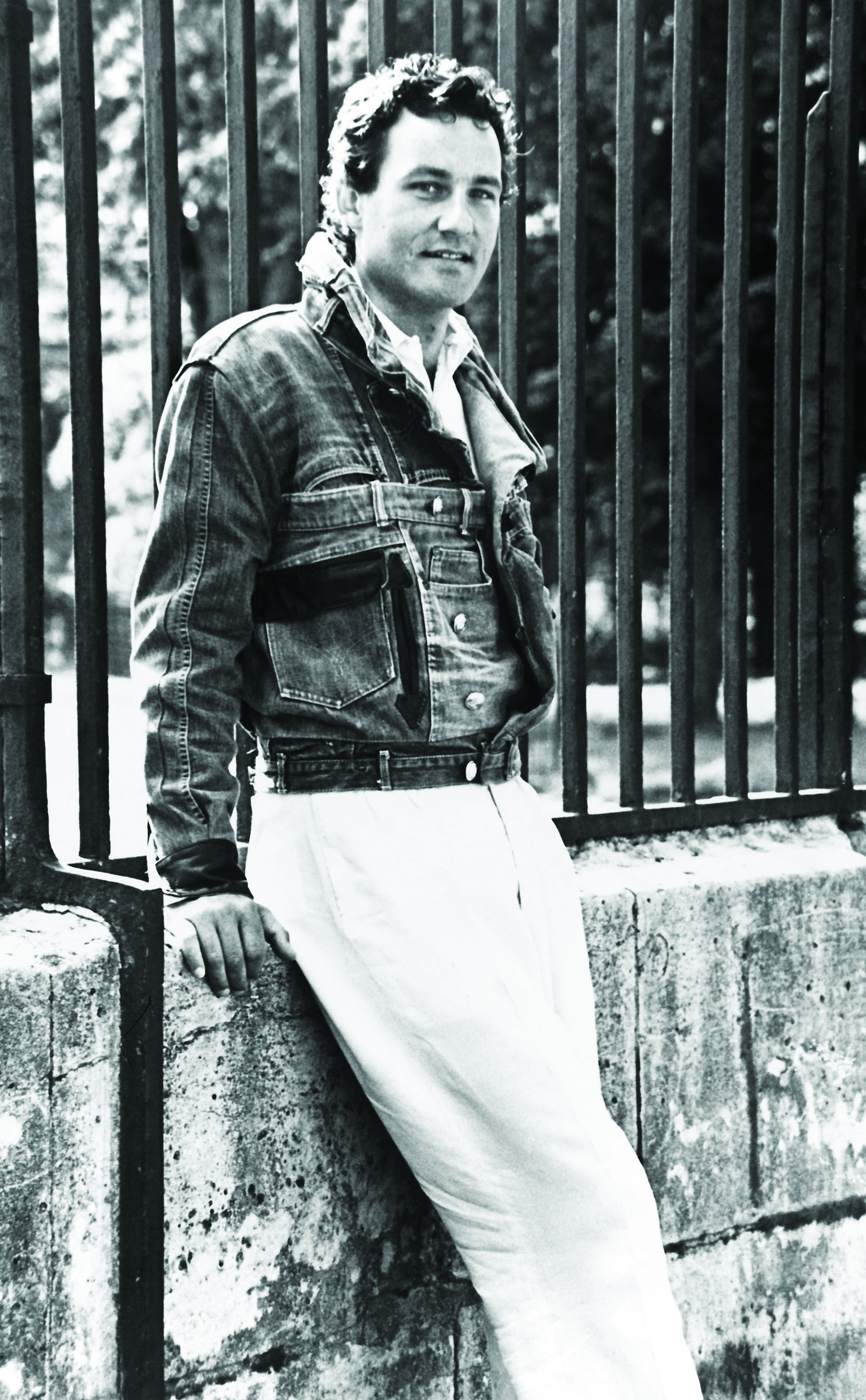
Thomas Meyer, Desigual founder

In 2011, Desigual started collaborating with French designer Christian Lacroix.

In 2012, the company officially opened its headquarters in the neighborhood of La Barceloneta in Barcelona, a glass building designed by Ricardo Bofill. Desigual then joined the Textile Exchange. In 2015, it inaugurated its logistics center in Viladecans.

In 2019, the company redefined its products, including new materials, patterns, and designs, to expand its audience and attract younger customers.

In 2020, Desigual continued the rollout of its new brand identity and launched its 2020–2023 Sustainability and Corporate Social Responsibility Plan. It also joined initiatives including the Sustainable Apparel Coalition (now Cascale), Better Cotton Initiative, The Fashion Pact and Sedex, reinforcing its commitment to responsible sourcing and sustainability. The same year, Desigual launched its first capsule collection with Spanish fashion designer María Escoté.

In 2021, Desigual introduced a four-day work week for its corporate employees in Spain after 86% of participating staff voted in favor of the initiative. The company also launched Awesome Lab, a startup accelerator created to support technological innovation and entrepreneurship in the fashion industry.

In 2022, Desigual joined ZDHC's Roadmap to Zero programme to strengthen responsible chemical management across its supply chain. Awesome Lab launched its second edition.

In 2023, Desigual launched its first Circular Denim collection as part of its circularity strategy and introduced a global campaign featuring American supermodel Hari Nef.

In 2024, the company marked its 40th anniversary with “Reflections”, a fashion show held in Barcelona presenting its Spring/Summer 2025 collection.The show featured models including Amelia Gray and Hari Nef. Later that year, Gray starred in the brand’s Autumn/Winter 2024–2025 campaign, “The Glow Up Show”.

In 2025, actress Ester Expósito became a global brand ambassador through the "Not a Doll" and "Desigualand" campaigns. That year, the company launched Desigual Studio, a premium line and the most elevated expression of its creative vision, focused on premium materials, refined craftsmanship and a more curated design approach. The line was presented through the Desigual Studio Fashion Show FW25 in Barcelona.

== Development ==
Initially recognized for its distinctive aesthetic based on patchwork, vibrant colors and artistic influences, Desigual has progressively evolved its creative direction towards a more contemporary and fashion-focused approach, while maintaining its focus on original design.

The company releases two main ready-to-wear collections each year: Spring/Summer and Autumn/Winter alongside capsule collections and limited-edition collaborations with international designers and brands. Since 2020, collaborators have included María Escoté, Collina Strada, Tyler McGillivary, Botter, Egonlab and Masha Popova.

Desigual operates an omnichannel business model combining physical retail and digital commerce. The company distributes its collections through directly operated stores, wholesale partners, department store concessions, marketplaces, and its official e-commerce platform. Its logistics network is centralized through distribution centres in Viladecans and Gavà (Spain), New Jersey (United States) and Hong Kong.

Manel Adell was Chief Executive Officer from 2002 to 2013, overseeing a period of rapid international growth. It achieved a 60% annual growth from 2002 to 2009, and a turnover of €250 million in 2009, €440 million in 2010 and €560 million in 2011. In 2011, it employed 2,900 people of 72 nationalities. In 2013 Manel Jadraque became the CEO. Further on, Alberto Ojinaga has been the managing director since 2016. As of 2025, Desigual operates in more than 100 countries through multiple distribution channels and employs more than 2,600 people worldwide. In 2025, the company also announced its entry into the Indian market through a strategic partnership with Myntra as part of its international expansion strategy.

As part of the transformation, in 2019, Desigual updated its visual identity, which continued with the rollout of a new retail concept inspired by contemporary art galleries across flagship stores. In 2020, the company was ranked among the most valuable Spanish brands on BrandZ, and received the bronze Laus Award for the new brand identity it launched in 2019.

Since 2020, sustainability has become a central pillar of Desigual's corporate strategy through its Sustainability and CSR Plan. The company joined organizations and initiatives including Amfori, Sedex, Better Cotton, Textile Exchange, the Fashion Pact and Cascale (formerly the Sustainable Apparel Coalition).

The company has progressively increased the use of materials with lower environmental impacts compared with conventional alternatives, including recycled and certified fibres, across its collections. It has also eliminated single-use plastic from product packaging and introduced environmental product information to help customers make more informed choices. According to its Sustainability Report, Desigual exceeded its target for increasing the share of lower-impact fibres in its collections and committed to sourcing 100% of its cotton from recycled or certified sources by 2025. In parallel, the company has adopted science-based greenhouse gas emissions reduction targets, including a 65% reduction in Scope 1 and Scope 2 emissions by 2026 (compared with 2019), and is pursuing a long-term net-zero emissions objective for 2050 through emissions reductions across its operations and value chain.

== Brand image ==
Over the years, the company has launched a number of themed collections, including "Real Life", "Magic Stories", "Luxury Feelings", "Me&You", "Better&Better", "Wow", "All Together", "Handmade", "Rainbow", "El Love", "La Difference", "El Now", "We are Animals" and "La vida es Chula".

In 2004, the company launched a line of T-shirts inspired by drawings of Thomas Meyer's daughters. In 2010, Desigual attracted attention with a sales campaign in Spain and Portugal inviting customers to enter stores wearing only their underwear, with the first 100 receiving a free outfit. Under the slogan "Enter naked, leave dressed", 200 people queued in their underwear on the street outside the Madrid store to take advantage of the winter sale. The campaign was repeated in London, Berlin, Stockholm, Madrid, Prague, and New York in June 2011, and in Madrid, Seville, and Lyon in January 2012.

One of the brand’s most notable campaigns starred Winnie Harlow, a Canadian model with vitiligo, who was the face of the spring-summer 2014 collection.Her participation was part of the brand's recurring use of campaigns centred on individuality and difference.

Desigual regularly creates collections with cultural and artistic figures. In addition to the collaboration with French designer Christian Lacroix, which began in 2011. That year, the company also entered a worldwide partnership with Cirque du Soleil, a collection of clothing and accessories. Desigual has additionally collaborated with Disney on collections referencing the brand's original denim patchwork jacket.

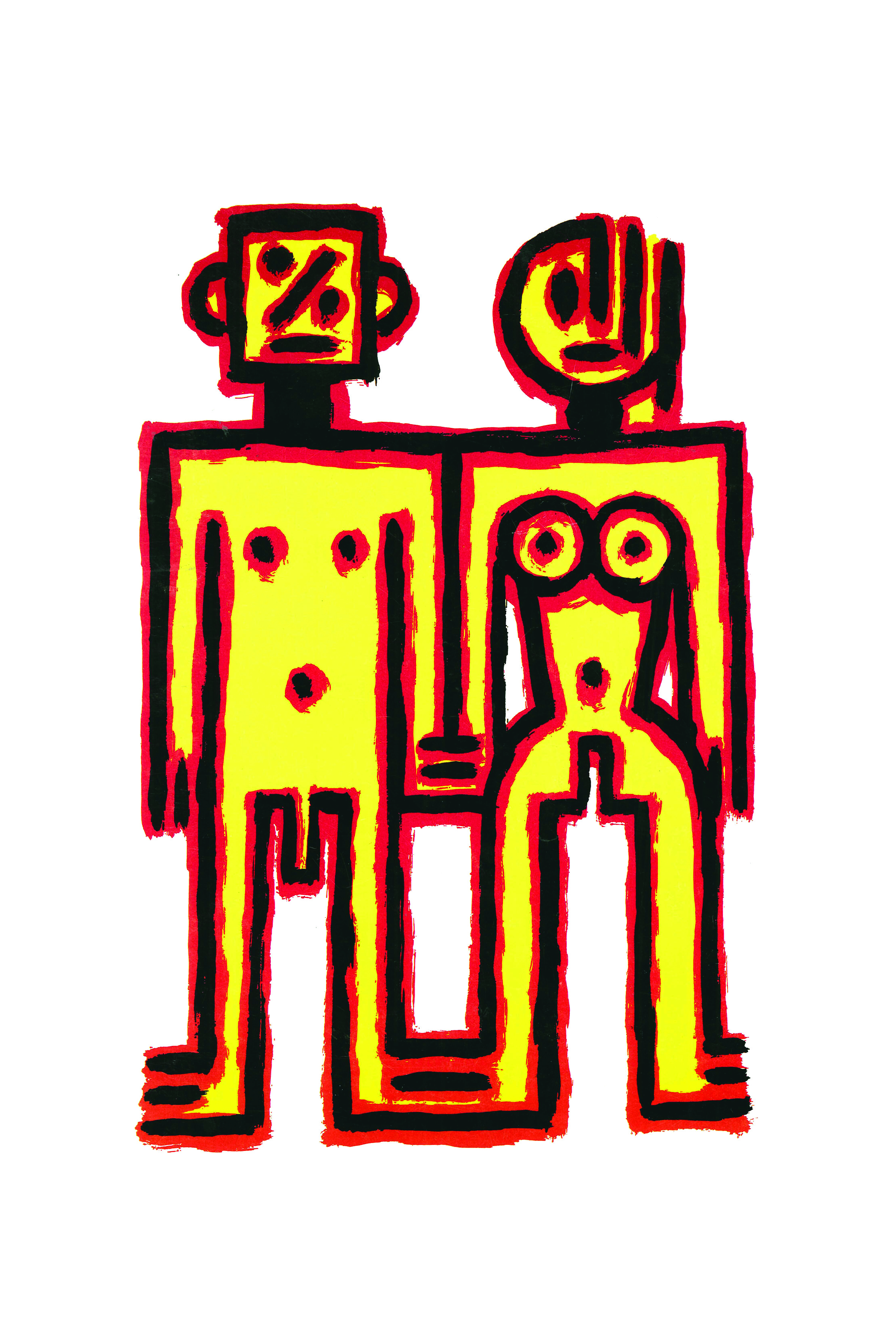
Desigual, first logo designed by Peret

From 2018 onwards, the firm expanded its creative partnerships and worked with a range of designers, artists, musicians and other cultural figures across capsule collections, campaigns and artistic projects. These have included artists Miranda Makaroff and Okuda San Miguel, designer María Escoté, actors Jordi Mollá and Najwa Nimri, as well as with Ecoalf, Victoria or Sonar Barcelona

Art Basel Miami Beach in 2019, Desigual presented its spring-summer 2020 collection with a fashion show, as well as an artistic show directed by Spanish artist Carlota Guerrero inspired by the kiss. the performance involved participants from fashion, art, film and music and concluded with couples and trios kissing in front of the audience.

In 2020, the brand continued to roll out its revamped image and a new retail store concept inspired by art galleries and Gaudi’s natural forms, featuring uncluttered spaces with fewer clothes and hangers, with the garment as the central item, to impress the customer.

The Autumn/Winter 2022 campaign was designed and carried out in black and white by photographer Mario Sorrenti and model Grace Elizabeth, who had previously modelled for Victoria’s Secret, Chanel and Fendi. The 2022 fall-winter campaign image is Nathy Peluso, the Argentine singer and songwriter, also known for her radical image, that embodies the brand's values.

In 2024, Desigual celebrated its 40th anniversary with “Reflections”, a runway show held on Barcelona's waterfront presenting its Spring/Summer 2025 collection. The collection revisited the brand's archives and Mediterranean roots through a contemporary approach, combining characteristic elements such as denim, patchwork, and colorful prints with a more elevated aesthetic. The show featured models including Amelia Gray and Hari Nef, while guests included Ester Expósito, Paris Jackson, Miranda Makaroff. The same year, the communication concept I Never Thought I'd Wear Desigual referred directly to changing perceptions of the brand and its attempt to connect with younger consumers.

In 2025, Desigual released the Not a Doll campaign starring Spanish actress Ester Expósito. The campaign focused on female autonomy, individuality and the rejection of stereotypes and objectification. Later that year, Desigual launched its premium line, Desigual Studio, with a runway show at the Nau de Turbines in Barcelona's Les Tres Xemeneies complex. The event brought together more than 500 guests from fashion, music, film and culture, including Edward Enninful, Paris Jackson, Lila Moss, Becky G, Nicki Nicole and Ester Expósito.

In 2026, Desigual returned to Ibiza, where the brand opened its first standalone store in 1986, to present Desigual Vintage, a capsule collection inspired by its archive under the name of "Love is the Answer". The collection was unveiled through a live performance by the dance collective People Watching, celebrating the brand's heritage through fashion, movement, and artistic expression.

== Digitalization ==
The transformation plan adopted in 2015 required an investment of more than 80 million euros in logistics processes, IT, innovation, and the distribution network. RFID technology has been implemented across all Desigual stores, to provide real-time inventory management and improve stock traceability throughout the supply chain.The company uses the "Ask Me" service, allowing multiple transactions to be carried out, from exchanges or returns to making purchases. The "Ship From Store" service has also been launched, a system that allows packages to be prepared at the closest store to the delivery point.

As for the online channel, the company has its website and sells its products through e-tailers and flash sales. Created in 1998, the desigual.com website was refreshed at the end of 2019 to align it with the new brand image, featuring advances in terms of personalization, scalability, and localization. Available in more than 150 markets, the online store is supported by cross-border e-commerce technologies from logistics and technology partner Global-e. It also integrates a system of recommendations based on artificial intelligence and offers users country-specific payment methods. The COVID-19 pandemic brought about a change in consumption and purchasing habits which boosted digital channels. Since May 2020, online sales on desigual.com have recorded an average growth of 50%, with peaks of up to 70%.

Desigual has also implemented IBM Sterling Order Management as its order management system. IBM describes Sterling as a platform that provides a unified view of orders and inventory and supports order fulfilment across physical and digital channels. Its implementation at Desigual has represented a significant advance in the company’s omnichannel capabilities, improving stock visibility, order orchestration, product allocation, and the use of inventory available across stores and warehouses. It has also expanded its use of advanced analytics in commercial planning and demand forecasting. Its Apolo project, developed with supply-chain software provider Slimstock, uses demand forecasting and geographical assortment management to optimise allocation and replenishment across stores, warehouses, and digital channels. The project has reduced stock levels, improved product availability, made replenishment more responsive to changes in demand, and allowed teams to devote more time to strategic activities.

Bloomreach is used as a customer platform and as an automation and personalisation tool. It brings together customer data from different channels and enables Desigual to orchestrate personalised communications, loyalty initiatives, product recommendations, newsletters, and abandoned-cart campaigns across multiple countries. The platform has reduced the manual work required to prepare campaigns and supports the company’s objectives of improving customer experience, retention, and customer lifetime value.

Artificial intelligence has become a broader strategic priority for Desigual. The company has formed teams combining business and IT professionals to develop AI projects focused on creativity, product development, demand forecasting, marketing, and operational efficiency.

Desigual's use of blockchain technology to improve visibility in the supply chain has been noted as an "important step" towards building in more transparency and accountability into the process of meeting customer needs.

== Innovation ==
In 2021, Desigual created Awesome Lab, a startup accelerator to drive tech innovation in the fashion sector and provide solutions to the industry's main challenges. This was a pioneering initiative in the fashion business in Spain.

In its first call, it was developed with the Plug and Play open innovation platform. Seven companies were chosen from more than 150: Vestico, Syrup Tech, Swearit, Personify XP, Resortecs, Exonode, and SXD, with ideas around blockchain, artificial intelligence, new materials, and machine learning. The second call, in 2022, is being carried out with Wayra, Telefónica's open innovation hub.

Since its launch, Awesome Lab has evolved from a startup accelerator into Desigual's open innovation platform. By 2026, the programme had reached its fifth edition with a stronger focus on identifying artificial intelligence, data and automation solutions that could be rapidly tested and integrated into the company's business operations. Since 2021, Awesome Lab has evaluated more than 500 startups, launched over 35 pilot projects and hosted Innovation Day events bringing together startups, technology companies and fashion industry experts.

== Supply Chain and Environmental initiatives ==
Desigual's clothing is mainly manufactured in Asia, primarily in countries such as China and India, with additional production taking place in Europe and the Middle East. In 2020, the company published the list of garment manufacturing facilities (Tier 1 suppliers) actively producing for the brand, as part of its supply chain transparency initiatives.

To monitor compliance with its Supplier Code of Conduct, which covers legal compliance, labor standards, human rights, occupational health and safety, environmental management and business ethics, Desigual carries out independent third-party social audits based on internationally recognized methodologies, including amfori BSCI , SMETA and FSLM

Over the years, the company has increased the incorporation of recycled and certified materials across its collections and has launched collections featuring garments containing organic and recycled fibres, including the Love the World collection introduced in 2021.

In 2022, the company announced its aim to reduce its absolute GHG (greenhouse gas) emissions by 65% in 2026, compared to its 2019 rates. This initiative is part of the company's more challenging goal of reaching carbon neutrality by 2050. The company has also joined the Roadmap to Zero project of ZDHC (Zero Discharge of Hazardous Chemicals) to ensure best chemical practices throughout the value chain, moving closer to the goal of zero discharges.

Regarding waste management, in 2021, the firm recovered 97% of the waste generated in its buildings and stores in Spain, around 1,100 tons. Overall, the company reduced waste generation by 20% compared to 2018. The goal of more sustainable packaging was achieved in 2021, when single-use plastic was removed from the packaging process.

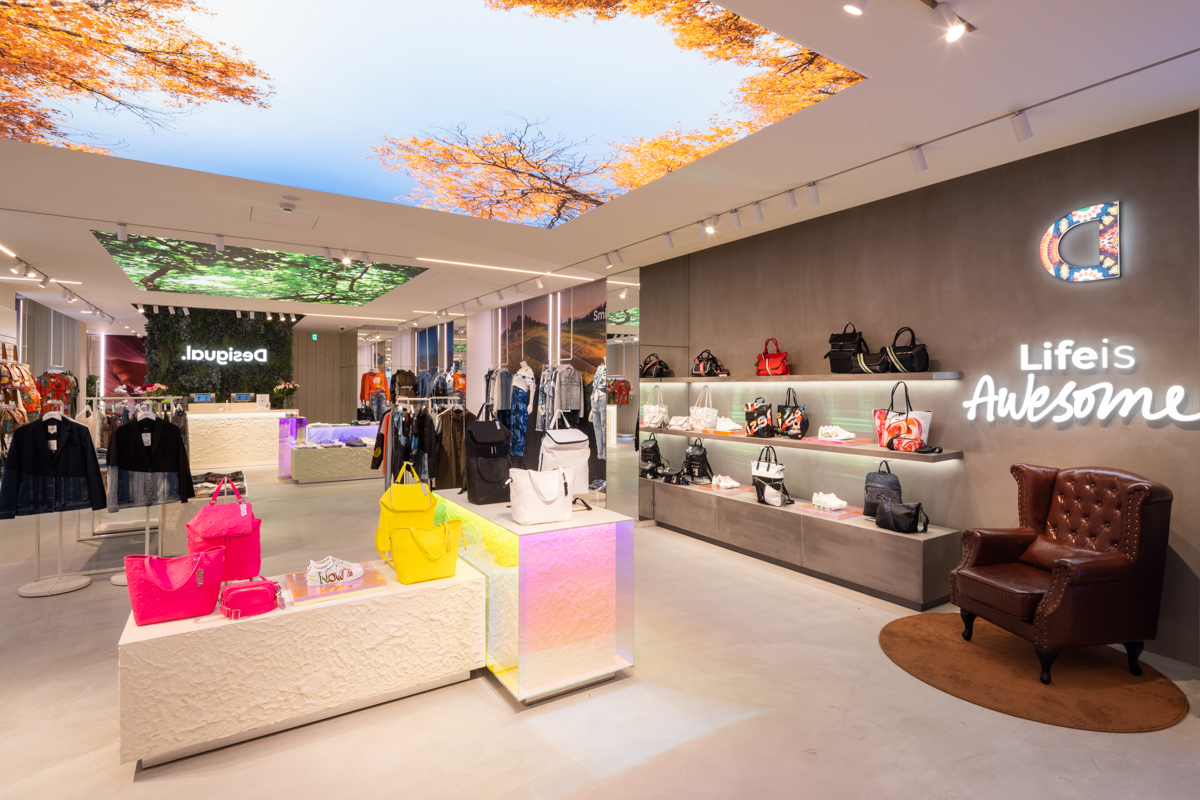
Desigual Store, Osaka, Japan

== Commercial network ==
Desigual has stores and points of sale in 109 countries: with recent store openings in Asia (China, Japan, India), South Africa, Latin America (Colombia, Peru, Mexico, Guatemala, Ecuador), Europe (Italy), and ecommerce launching in Hong Kong, Russia and Turkey, among other markets. More precisely in Albania, Algeria, Andorra, Antigua and Barbuda, Armenia, Aruba, Australia, Austria, Azerbaijan, Bahrain, Belgium, Belarus, Bosnia and Herzegovina, Bermuda, Brazil, Brunei, Bulgaria, Canada, China, Colombia, Costa Rica, Chile, Croatia, Cyprus, Curaçao, Czech Republic, Ecuador, Estonia, El Salvador, Czech Republic, Denmark, Egypt, Russian Federation, United Arab Emirates, Finland, France, Germany, Mexico, Georgia, Gibraltar, Greece, Guadeloupe, Honduras, Hong Kong, Hungary, Iceland, India, Indonesia, Cayman Islands, Israel, Ireland, Italy, Japan, Jersey, Jordan, Kazakhstan, Kuwait, Latvia, Lebanon, Lithuania, Luxembourg, Macao, Macedonia, Malaysia, Malta, Montenegro, Morocco, Myanmar, Netherlands, New Zealand, Oman, Panama, Paraguay, Philippines, Poland, South Korea, Portugal, Puerto Rico, Qatar, Dominican Republic, Romania, Saudi Arabia, Singapore, Cuba, Spain, Serbia, Sri Lanka, South Africa, Switzerland, Sweden, Taiwan, Trinidad and Tobago, Tunisia, Turkey, Uruguay, Ukraine, United Kingdom, United States, Peru, Venezuela, Vietnam and Guatemala.

== Disputes ==
In July 2008, the company Custo Barcelona, owned by designer Custo Dalmau, threatened to sue Desigual for systematically copying several of its products in an attempt to confuse customers, but the complaint never reached the courts. Within the textile industry, this was believed to be an advertising strategy of Custo’s to find new partners. Later that year, the firm Dolores Promesas filed a complaint against Desigual for copyright infringement after the company marketed a T-shirt with a design identical to one of its own. The complaint was settled out of court, with Desigual issuing a formal apology and withdrawing all garments with that design.

In 2014 the company received criticism for releasing a television commercial around Mother's Day which featured a woman poking a hole in a condom, displaying the words "You decide" on the screen. The company stated in its official Twitter profile that it was a humorous and fictional commercial, that included the warning text "do not try it at home".

In 2025, Desigual's “Not a Doll” campaign starring Ester Expósito generated debate after its slogan was interpreted in relation to the use of the term “doll” within trans and queer communities. Initially conceived around female autonomy and the rejection of stereotypes and objectification, the campaign prompted the company to further address the conversation during Pride Month. Desigual subsequently displayed a large banner at its flagship store on Calle Preciados in Madrid in support of trans rights. Later that year, Samantha Hudson appeared on an episode of the brand's Desigual Talks podcast titled “Dolls y Muñecas”, discussing the meaning and history of the term “doll” within queer culture and its connection to the campaign.

During Desigual's Spring/Summer 2025 runway show in Barcelona, media outlets and social media users speculated about an apparently tense interaction between Paris Jackson and Ester Expósito after the two briefly greeted each other on the front row. The moment went viral and was widely covered by entertainment media, although both later dismissed rumors of any disagreement when both shared matching t-shirts "I love Paris, I love Ester" and they also reunited at the brand's 2025 Desigual Studio show.

At the launch event for Desigual Vintage in Ibiza in 2026, Vivian Jenna Wilson attracted media attention after being repeatedly asked by reporters about her relationship with her father, Elon Musk, rather than about the event itself. The exchange was widely reported by celebrity media and shifted part of the public attention away from the collection presentation.
