= Custo Dalmau =

Spanish fashion designer

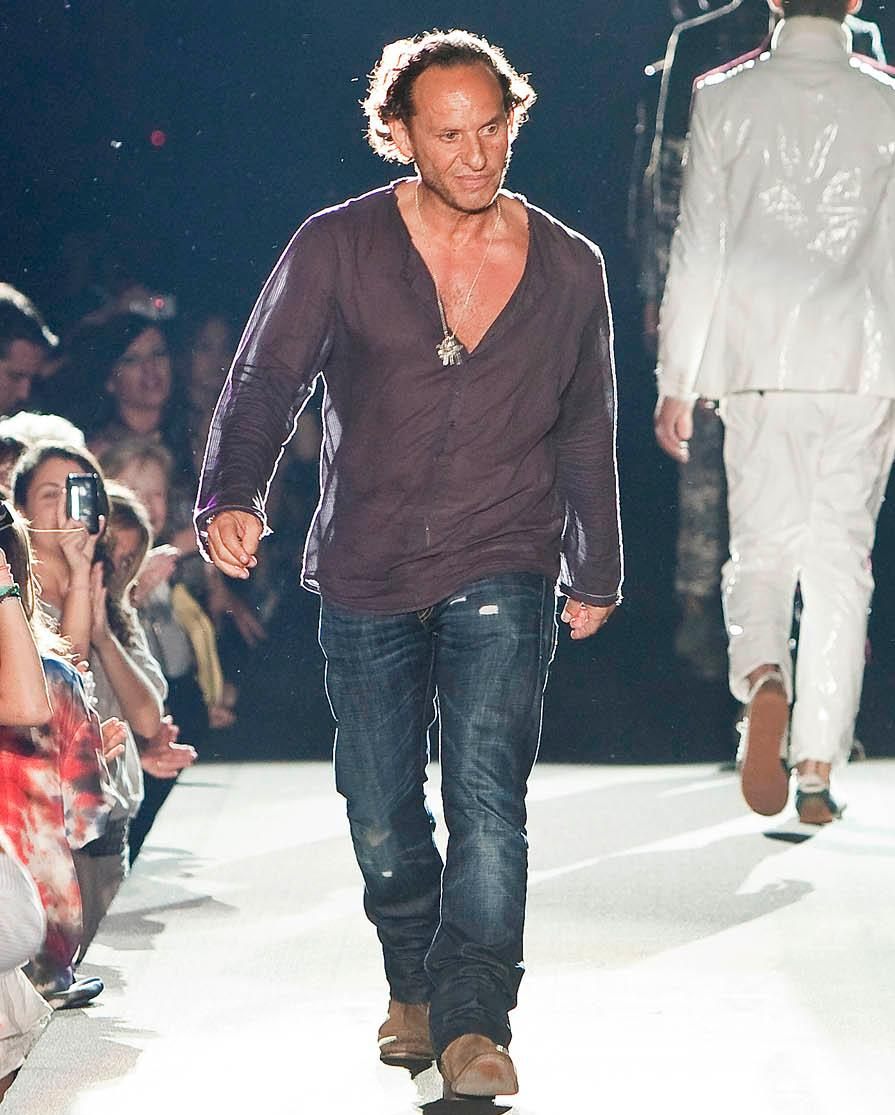
Custo Dalmau at The Brandery fashion show (Barcelona, 2010)

Custo Dalmau (Catalan pronunciation: [ˈkustu ðəlˈmaw]; born 1959 as Ángel Custodio Dalmau Salmons in Tremp, Spain) is a Spanish fashion designer.

== Career in fashion ==
He spent his childhood and adolescence in Barcelona, where he studied architecture. In 1980, he founded the label Custo Line with his brother David which in 1996 became Custo Barcelona and today is a label of Blue Tower S.L., Barcelona. Initially focusing on printed tops and T-shirts inspired by the looks of Californian surfers, the label meanwhile has added a full range of women's clothing, a men's line, as well as shoes and accessories.

== Private life ==
Dalmau is married to Eva Vollmer who is responsible for the label's kids line Custo Growing. Custo Dalmau is father to 2 daughters (one of which is not his biological daughter) and two sons. He spends his time between the family home in Barcelona and the USA.
