= Sita Murt =

Catalan fashion designer and businesswoman

Carmen "Sita" Murt
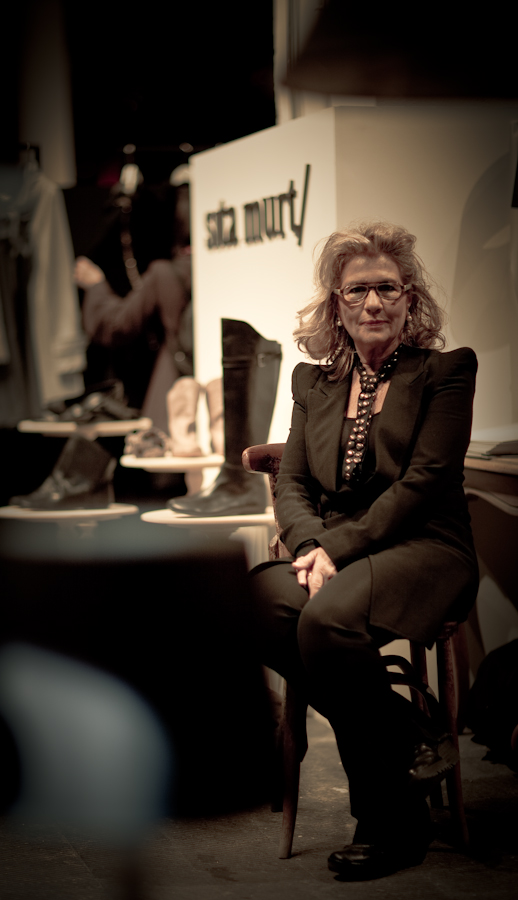
- Sita Murt at The Brandery show, in 2010
- Born: 1946
- Died: 1 December 2014 (aged 67–68)
- Occupations: Fashion designer, businesswoman

Carmen "Sita" Murt (Catalan pronunciation: [ˈsitə ˈmuɾt]; 1946 – 1 December 2014) was a Catalan fashion designer and businesswoman. Her name, Sita, was a diminutive form of Carmencita, a diminutive of her legal first name, Carmen.

== Biography ==
Murt was born in 1946 as the daughter of the owner of a tannery in Igualada, Barcelona, and belonged to the third generation of a textile industry dynasty in Igualada. At an early age, she used to collect small pieces of leather at the family factory, which she tried to use for creating pieces of clothing. She studied at the Sarrià School of Textile Design.

She married Toni Esteve Enrich, manager of the Esteve Aguilera company, founded in 1924, and incorporated as SA in 1965. After some years, when her kids had grown, she started being involved in the design of products, mainly knitted jerseys.

She created her own designs. The untimely death of her husband Toni in 1984 changed her plans. Her father-in-law decided to appoint her as the company manager. From 1989 onward, the company attended many fashion shows to present the new collections, including Salons Gaudí in Barcelona, Pasarela Cibeles in Madrid, Bread & Butter in Germany and Barcelona, The Brandery in Barcelona, Premium (Berlin), Gallery (Copenhagen), Coterie (New York City) and Modefabriek, Who's Next and Paris sur Mode (Paris). The company replaced the original brand Esteve, to Sita Murt, and opened several direct stores and an outlet store in Igualada. Her designs are marketed by the company Esteve Aguilera SA, which produces more than 200,000 jerseys and other pieces of clothing per year, Murt died of cancer on 1 December 2014, aged 68.

== Awards ==
- Premio al Mérito Exportador (2002) from the Prince of Asturias.
- Award "Barcelona es moda" for business initiative (2008)
- Calderera de honor de Montmaneu (2010).
