= Law enforcement in Spain =

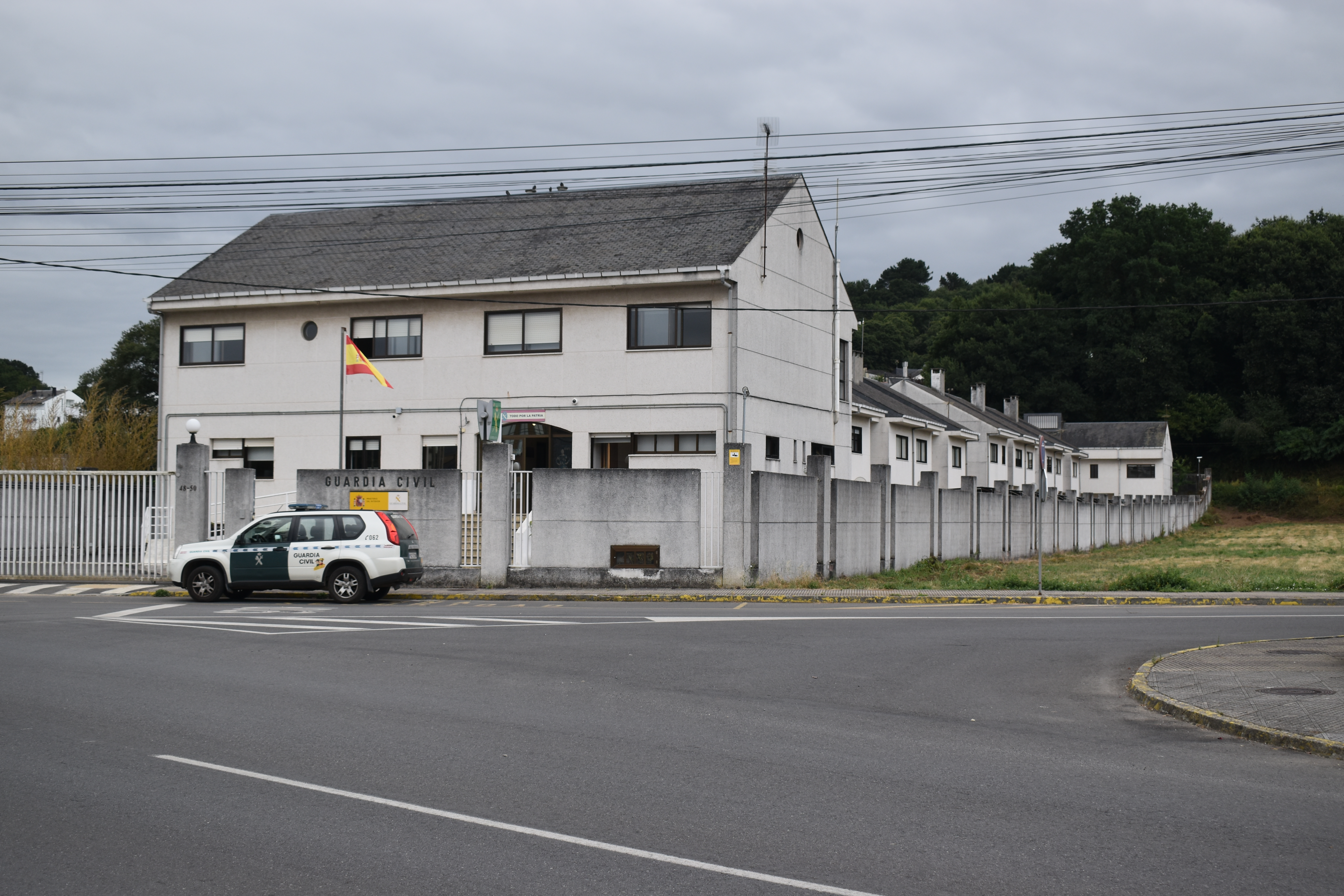
"Casa Cuartel", a type of police station, from the Civil Guard in Sarria.

Law enforcement in Spain is carried out by numerous organizations, with different duties and jurisdictions. Police officers in Spain are permanent public servants, who uphold public safety and compliance of the law.

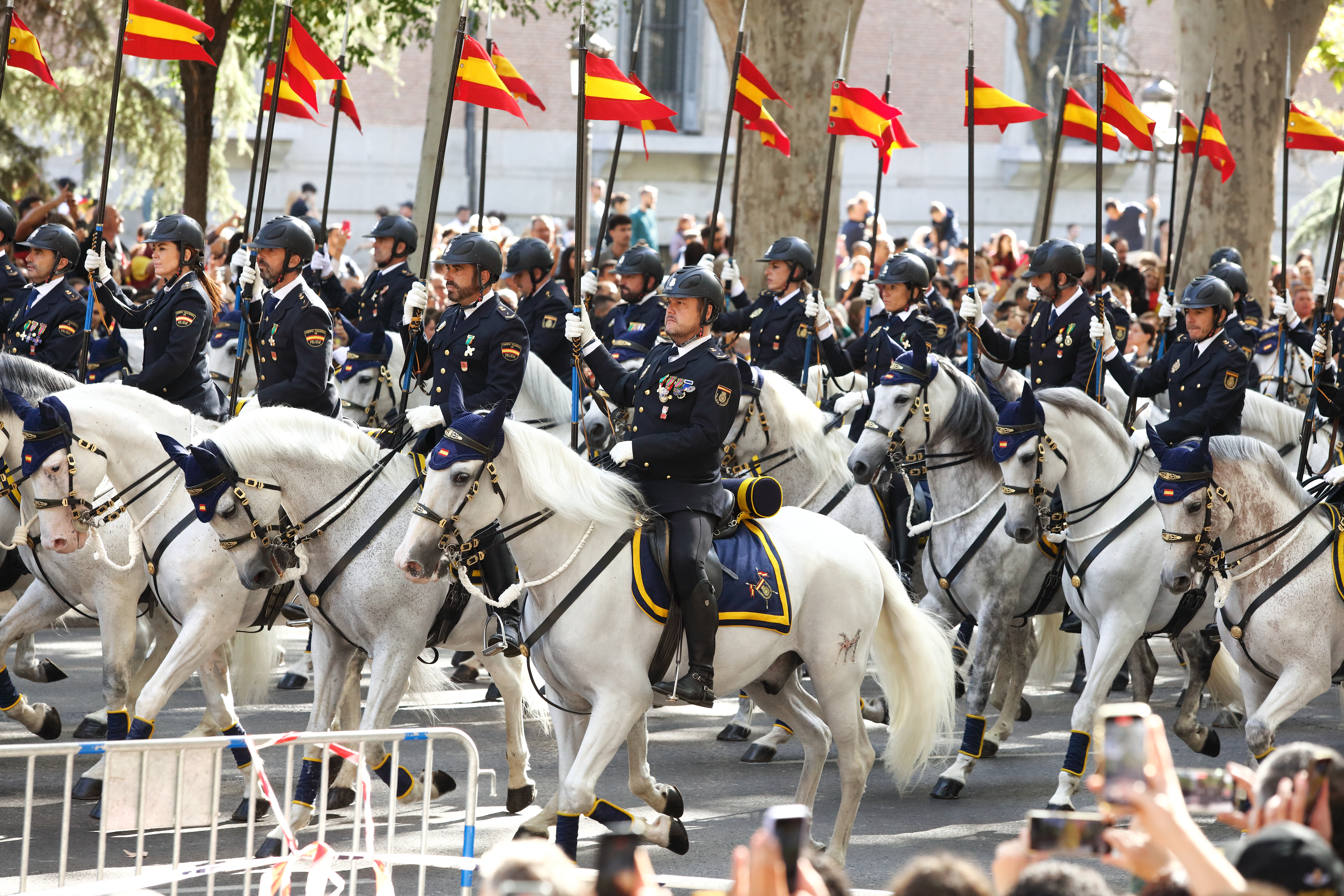
National Police Mounted Unit during a National Day parade.

Being a law enforcement officer in Spain is not only a job, but rather a legal condition ("agents from the authority"), as they are legally obligated to intervene in all situations they witness "in defense of the law and public safety" regardless of them being on or off duty.

Police forces in Spain are armed.

== Types of police forces ==
In Spain, different police forces operate on the national, autonomous and local level.

=== National forces ===
The law enforcement bodies that operate in most of the national territory, under the Ministry of the Interior, are:

- Cuerpo Nacional de Policía (National Police Corps) is the civilian police force with the duties of urban areas policing, judicial investigations, documentation expedition and immigration enforcement. It is formed by about 73.000 officers.
- Guardia Civil (Civil Guard) is the national gendarmerie force responsible for rural areas policing, firearms and explosives control; traffic policing on intercity roads; protection of coasts, borders, ports, and airports; enforcement of environmental and conservation laws, including those governing hunting and fishing; and intercity transport of prisoners. During wartime, it depends from the Ministry of Defense. It has also operated as military police in support of the Spanish Armed Forces on peace-keeping deployments. It is formed by about 81.500 officers.
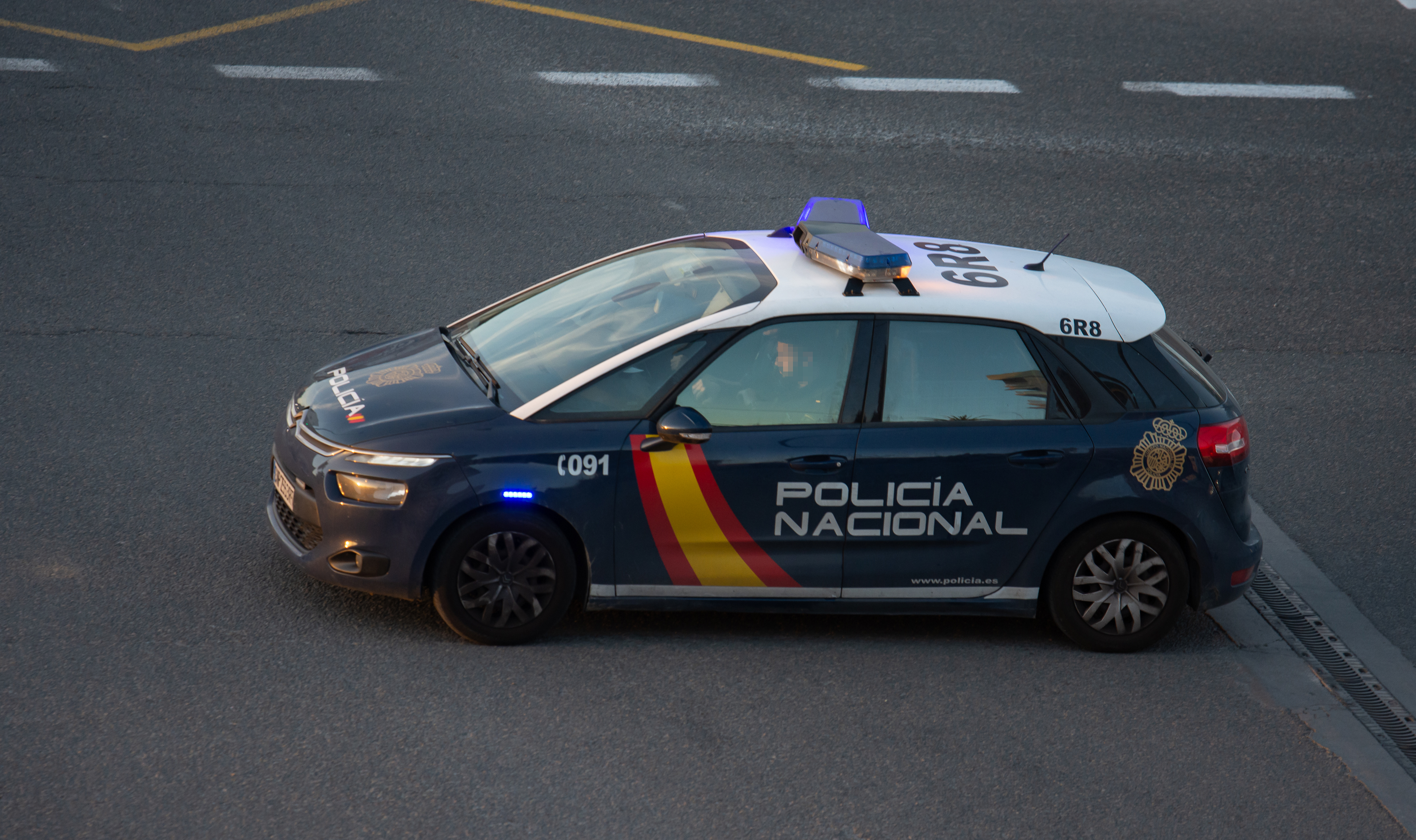
Policía Nacional patrol vehicle.

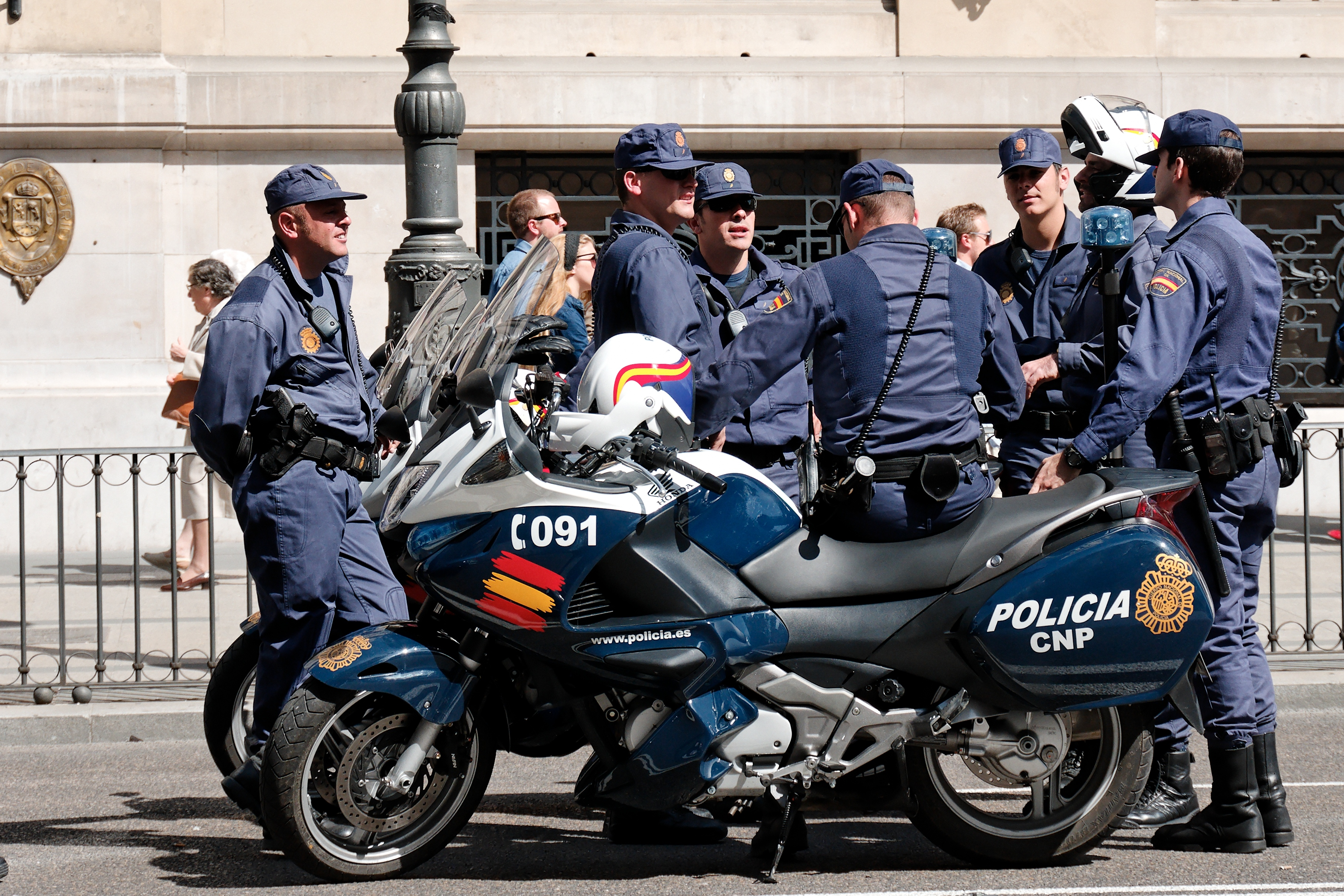
Policía Nacional officers and motorbike.

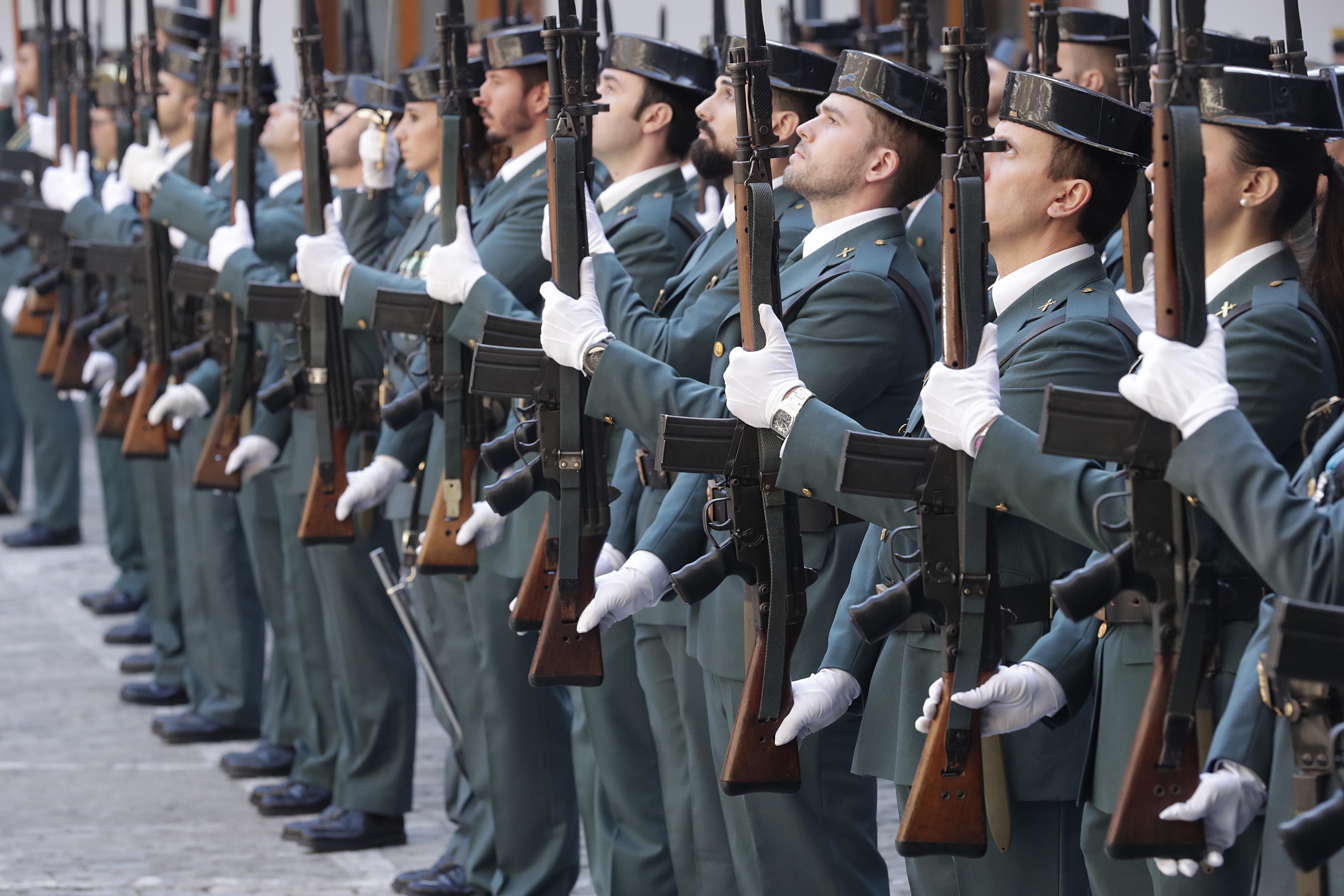
Guardia Civil in a parade.

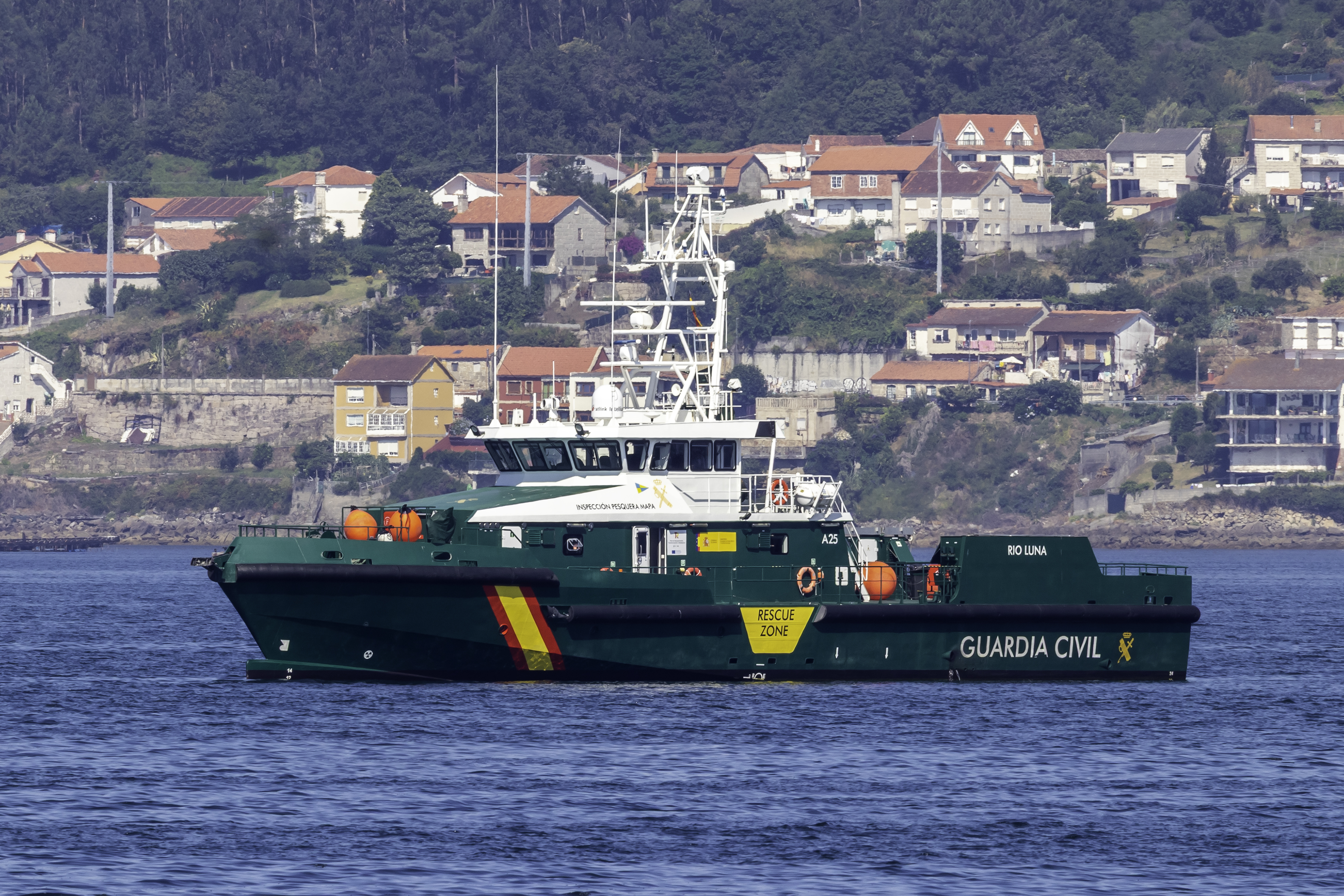
Guardia civil patrol boat.

=== Autonomous forces ===
As Spain is divided in autonomous communities, some have acquired policing duties over time. The autonomous communities that have their own police forces take over on most duties of the national-level forces. These are:

Autonomous Community	Force name	Officers	Notes
Basque Country	Ertzaintza	6,865	Has replaced the national forces in most duties.
Catalonia	Mossos d'Esquadra	19,029	Has replaced the national forces in most duties.
Navarre	Policía Foral	1,116	Still shares some duties with the national forces.
Canary Islands	Policía Canaria	286	Not an integral police force, shares duties with the national forces.

They answer to their respective autonomous governments interior/public safety departments.

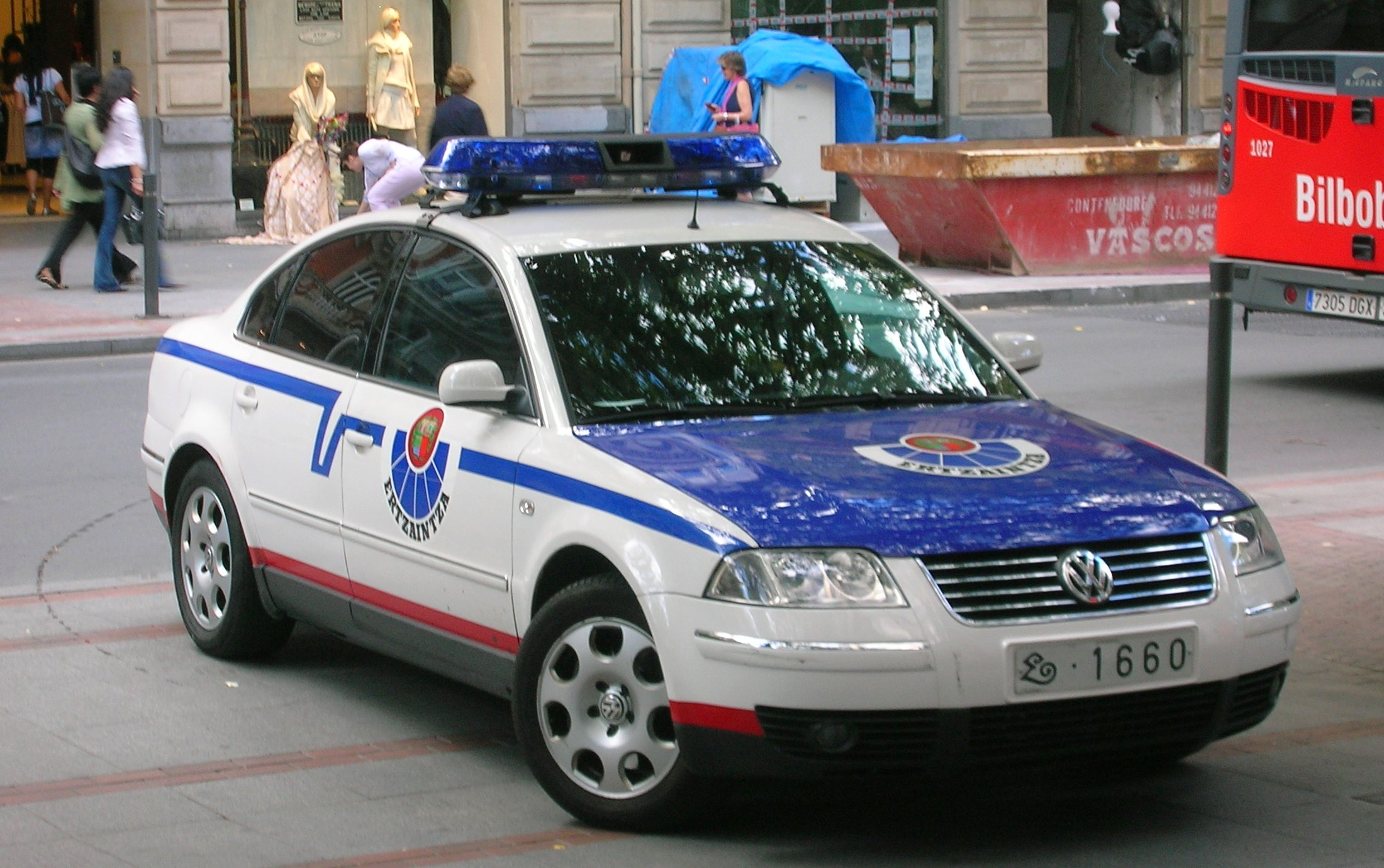
Ertzaintza patrol vehicle in Bilbao.

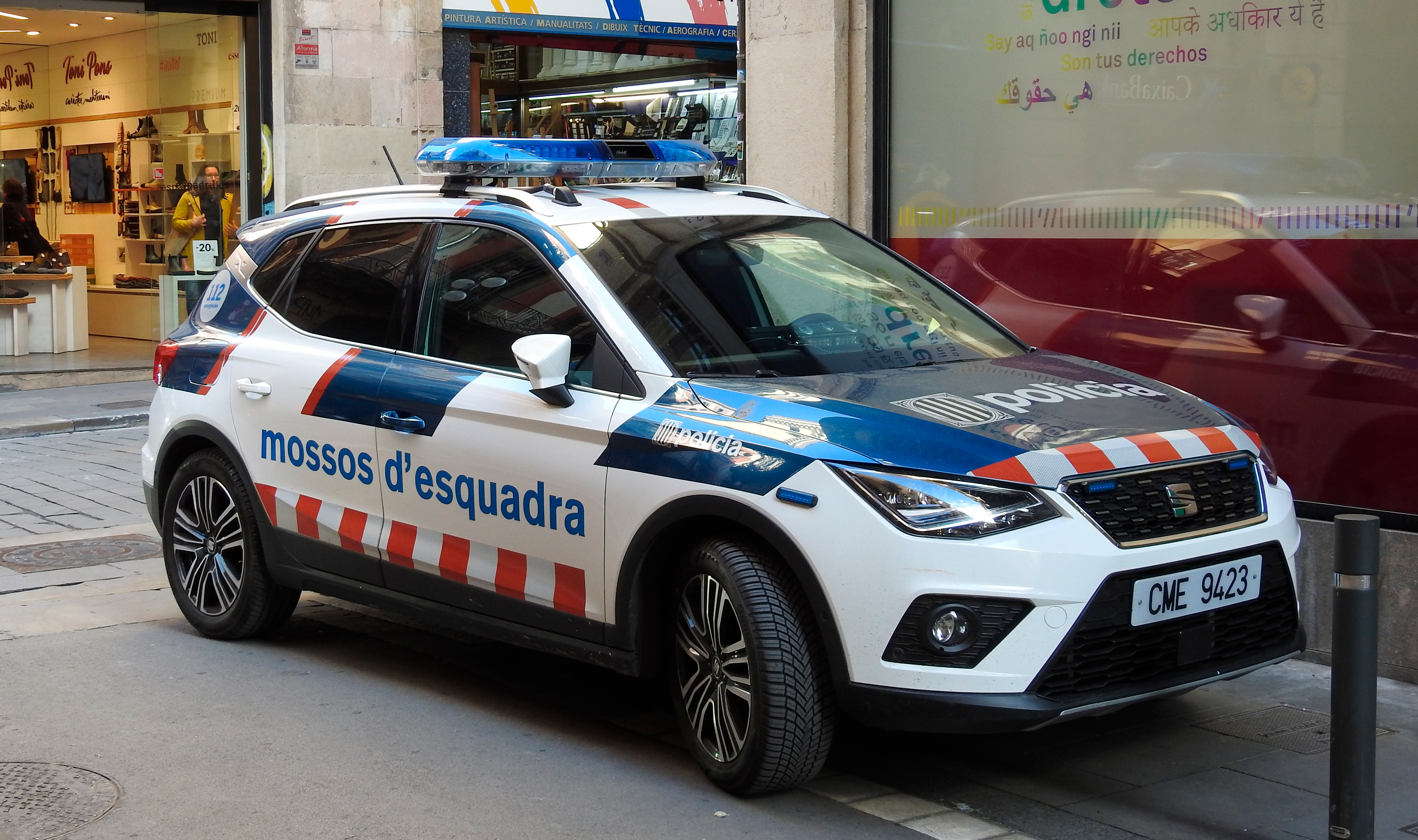
Mossos d'Esquadra patrol vehicle in Barcelona.

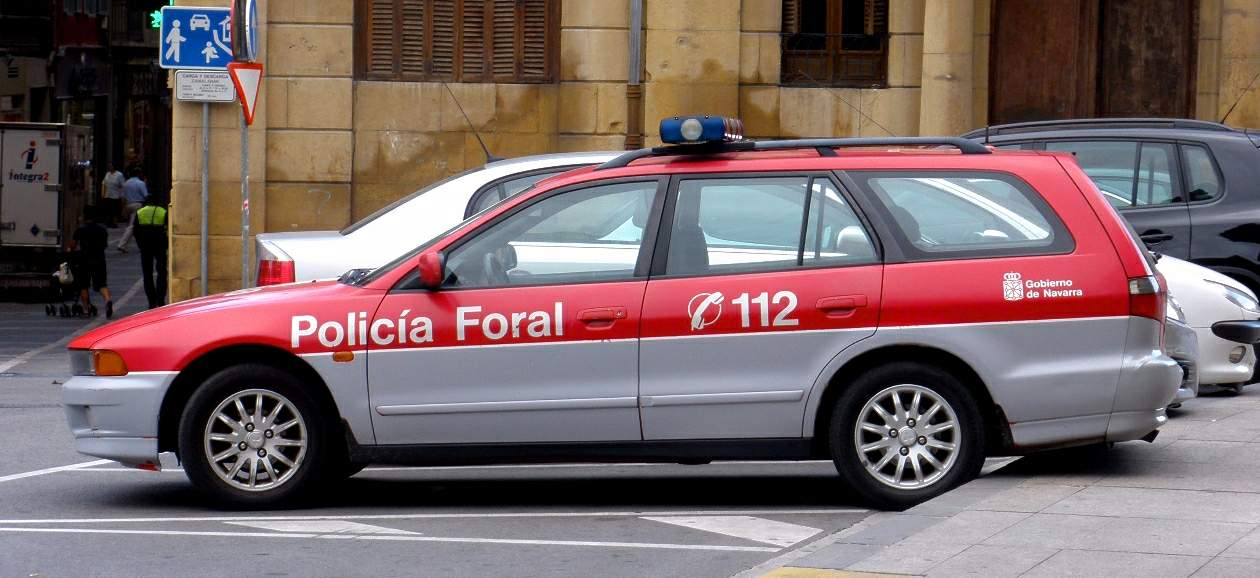
Policía Foral patrol vehicle in Pamplona.

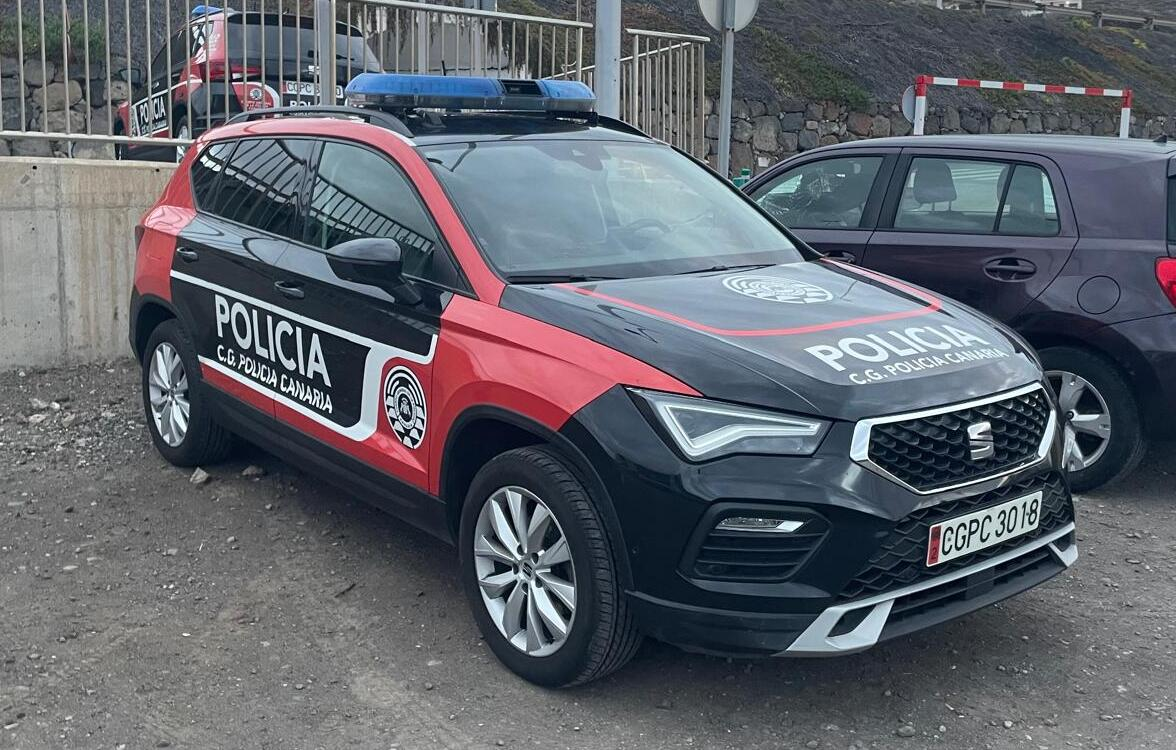
Policía Canaria patrol vehicle.

Other autonomous communities that do not have their own forces may have shared units with the National Police (Unidad del Cuerpo Nacional de Policía adscrita a la Comunidad Autónoma) that carry out building protection, VIP escorts, control of gambling installations and other small duties. Currently Andalusia, Valencian Community, Galicia and Aragon have active shared units.

=== Local forces ===
Every municipality in Spain with a population of at least 5.000 is allowed to have a local police force. Their duties are mostly based on cooperation in public safety with the national or autonomous force and traffic enforcement and investigation.

They can be known as Policía Municipal, Policía Local or Guàrdia Urbana depending on their historic background.

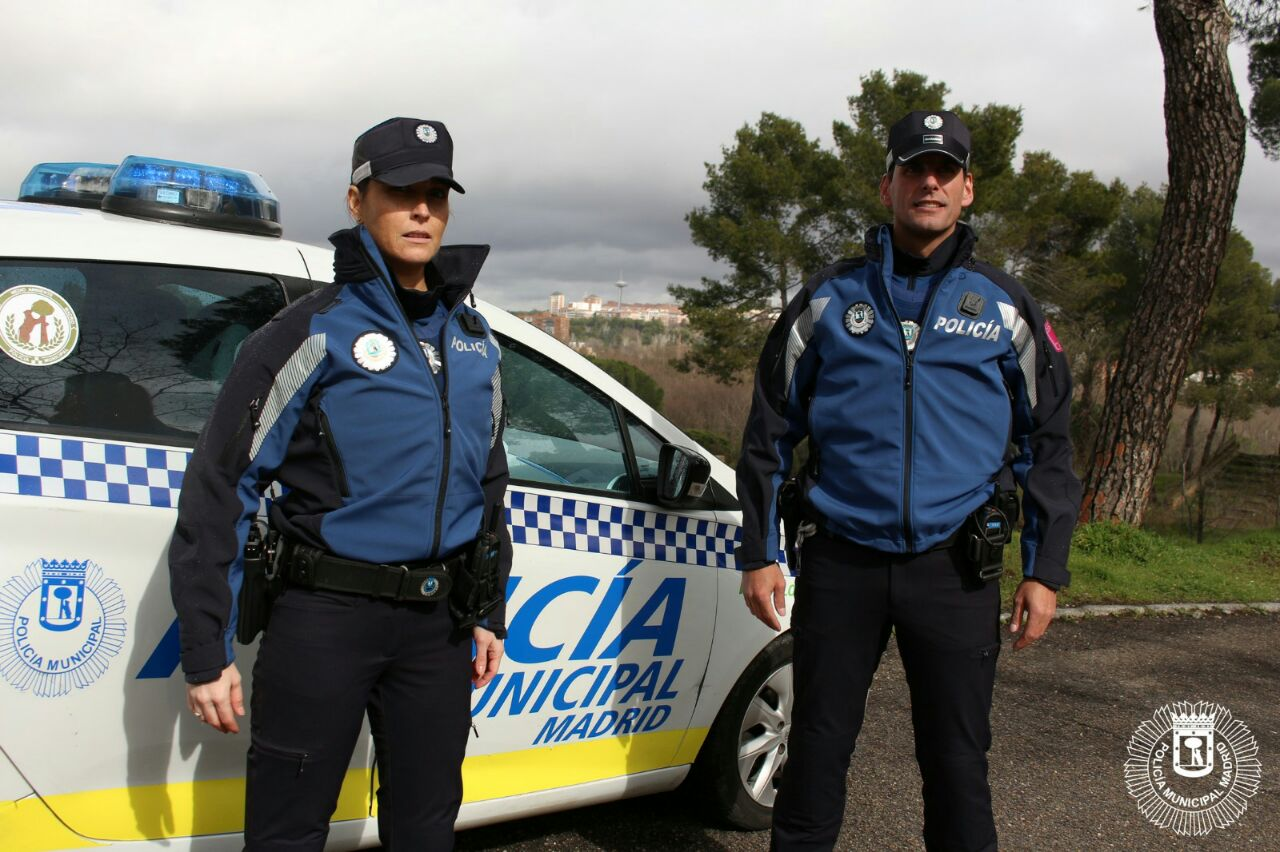
Policía Municipal de Madrid officers.

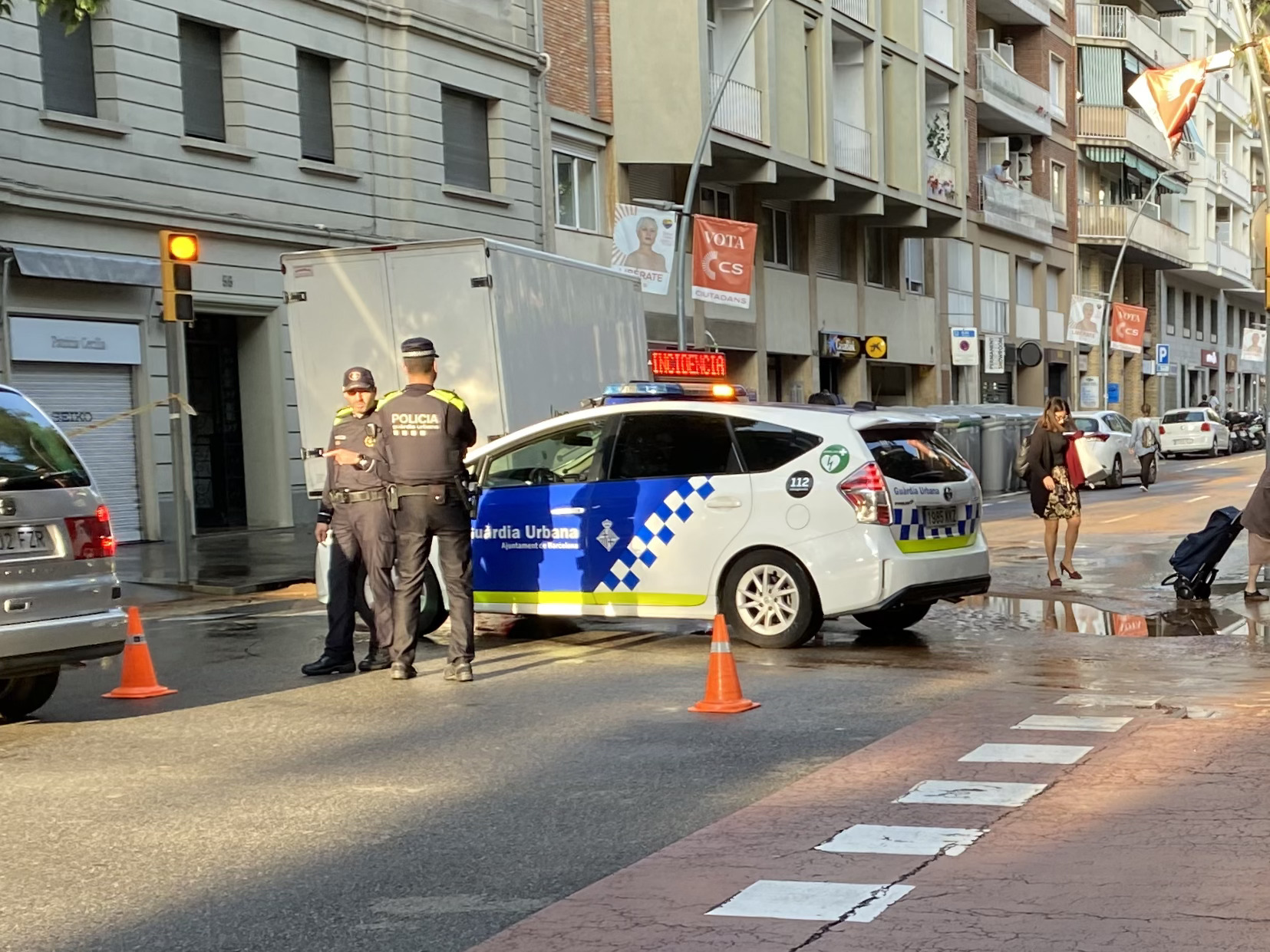
Guàrdia Urbana de Barcelona officers.

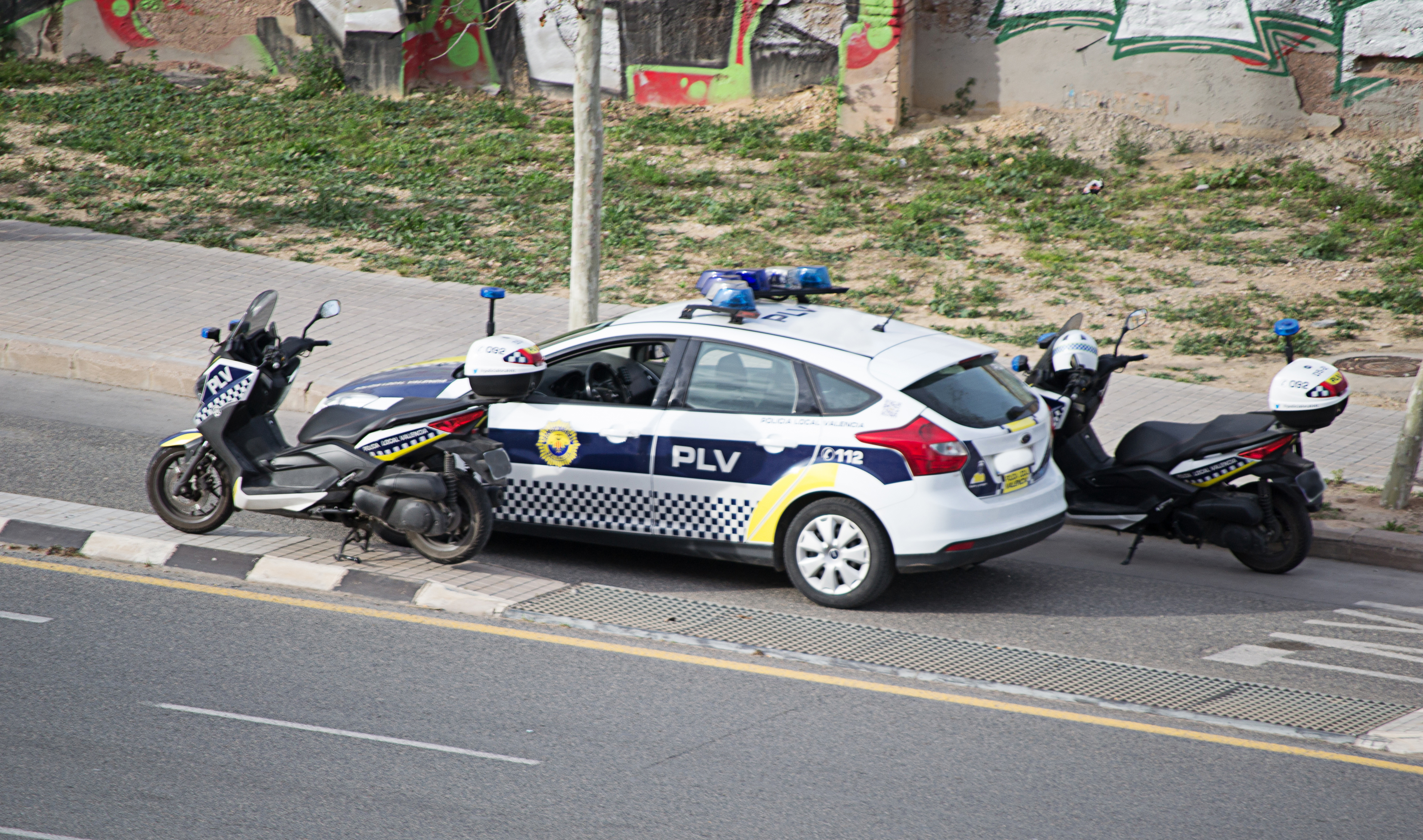
Policía Local de Valencia vehicles.

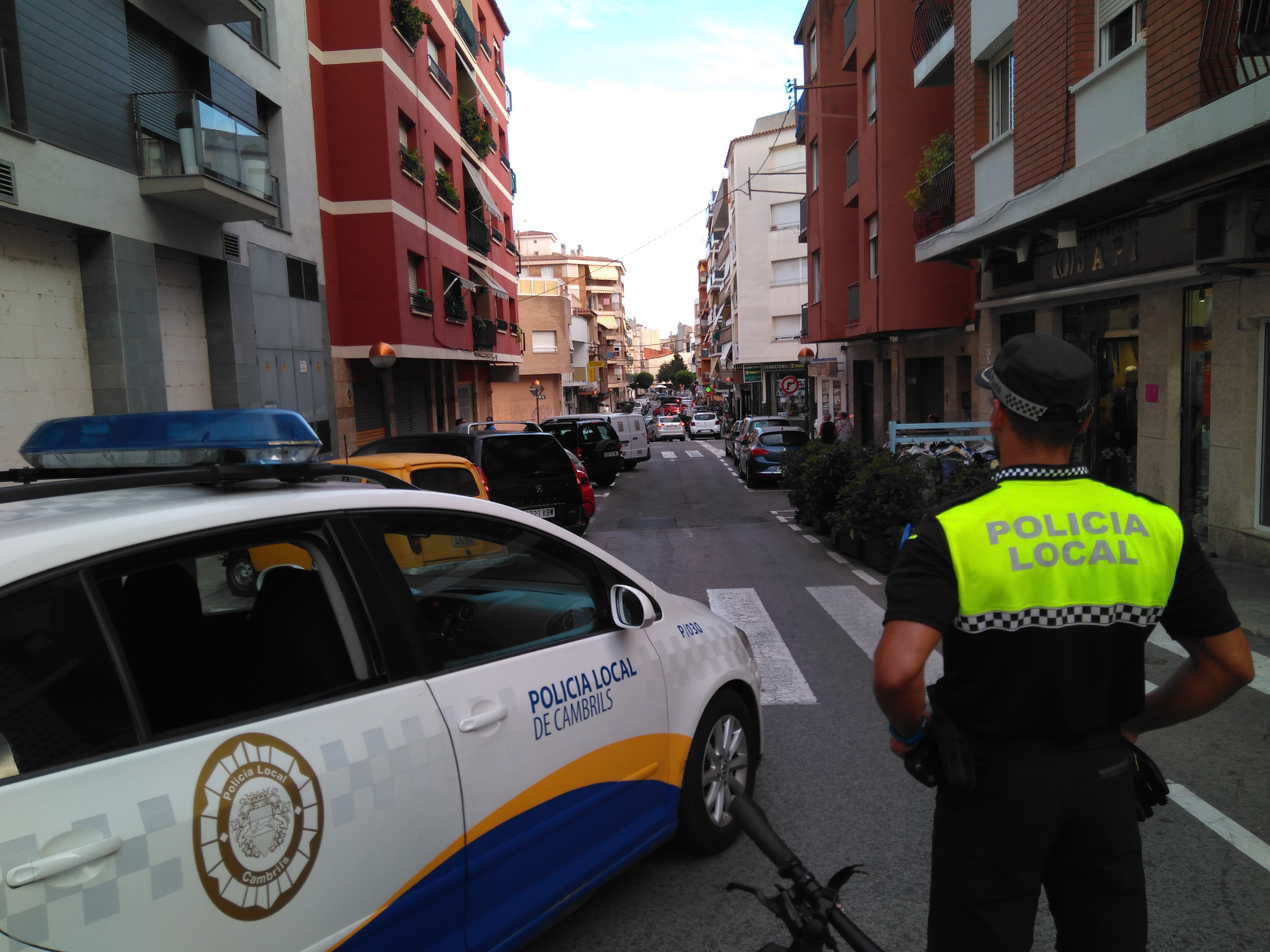
Policía Local de Cambrils officer.

=== Other ===
Spain has other police forces that carry out specific duties, such as:

- Servicio de Vigilancia Aduanera (Customs Vigilance Service) is in charge of customs inspections, smuggling investigations, tax evasion, and illegal financial transactions, particularly those involving import-export businesses and currency exchange (mostly in cooperation of the National Police and the Civil Guard). Most of its officers are stationed at border crossing points with France, Andorra, and Portugal.
- Policías Portuarias (Port Police) are forces dependent on each maritime port authority that provide uniformed policing duties related to public safety in loading and unloading of vessels, storage of cargo and traffic enforcement within portuary areas.
- Agentes forestales (Forestry agents) are forces dependent on autonomous communities that control hunting activities and prevent visitors from gathering or damaging wild plants, dumping rubbish, starting fires or behaving irresponsibly in addition to providing routine surveillance and fire extinction services via regular surface and airborne patrols as well as from fixed towers and strategic installations.
- Even though Guardia Civil has a military aspect, military bases and installations policing is carried out by military forces.
  - Policía Militar (Military Police) for Army bases.
  - Policía Naval (Naval Police) for Navy and Marines bases.
  - Policía Aérea (Aerial Police) for Air and Space Force bases.
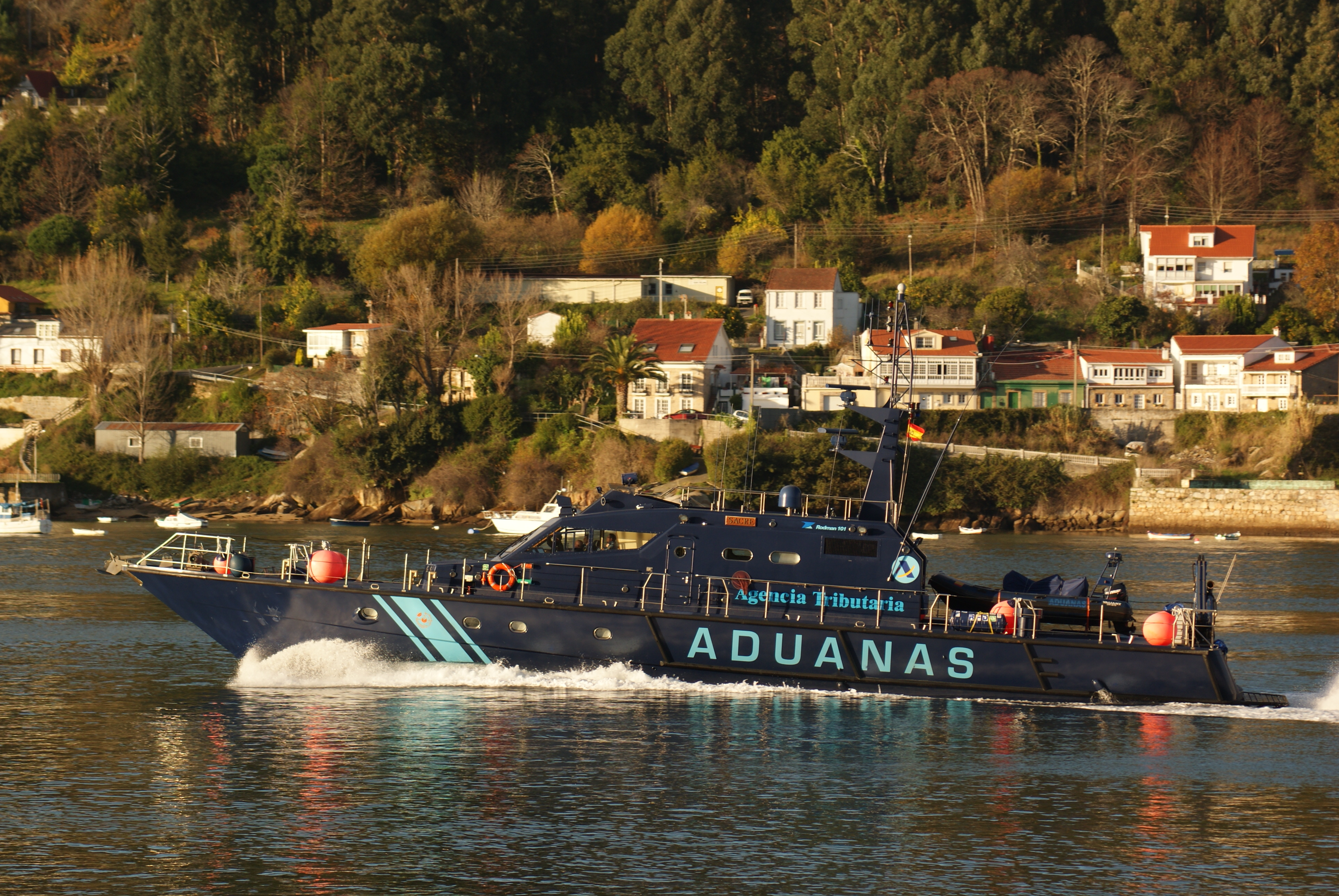
'Sacre' patrol boat from the Servicio de Vigilancia Aduanera.

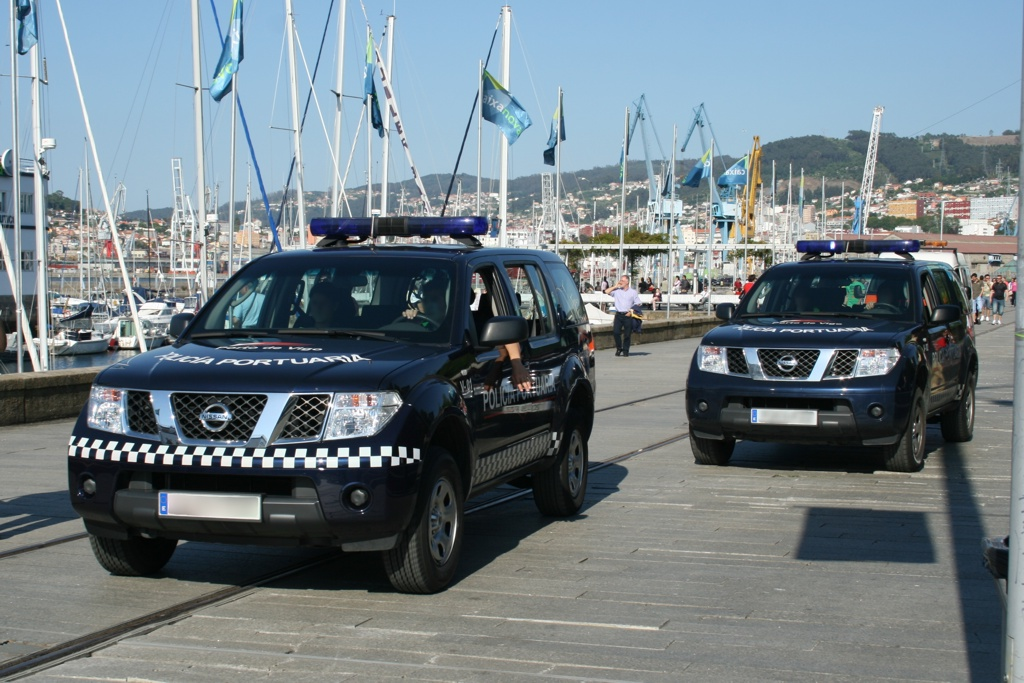
Policía Portuaria de Vigo patrol vehicles.

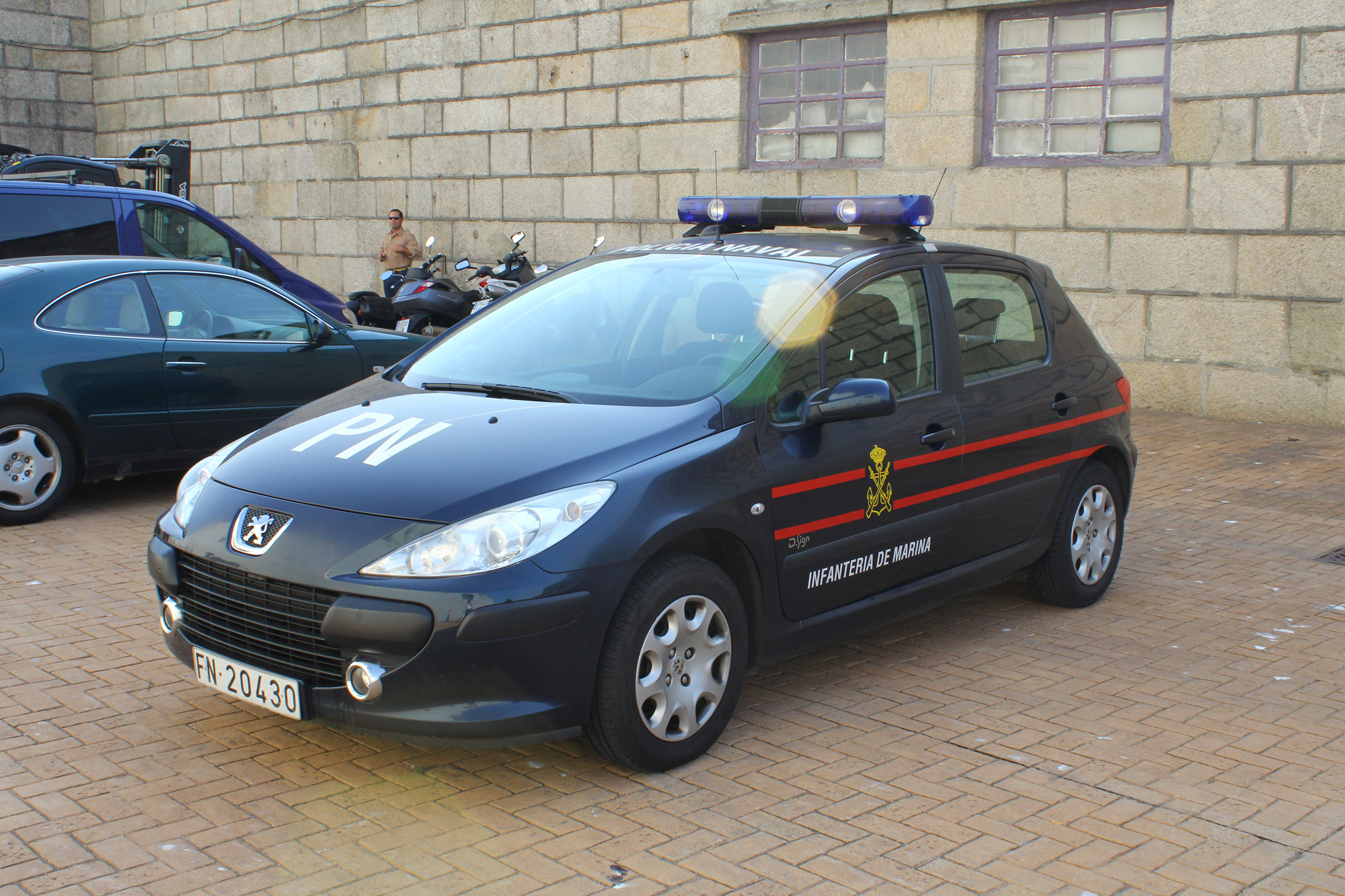
Policía Naval old vehicle.

Even though there are several different police forces in Spain, they usually cooperate in the exercice of their duties and investigations. The National Intelligence Centre also cooperates with police forces providing both foreign and domestic intelligence.

== Madrid regional programs ==
BESCAM, Brigadas Especiales de Seguridad de la Comunidad Autónoma de Madrid (Special Security Brigades for the Autonomous Community of Madrid), was a policing cooperative program created by the government of the Community of Madrid in Spain. It was not a specific police organization but rather a project of the regional government of the Autonomous Community of Madrid 2500 which funded local police distributed among the different municipalities of the Community in response to strict technical criteria, with particular emphasis on the population, geographic location or, in the case of those with fewer than 25,000 inhabitants, taking into account the seasonal population increase, or other factors such as low levels of police staffing, industrial development and urban growth. BESCAM was replaced on December 30, by Estrategia de Seguridad Integral en la Comunidad de Madrid (Integral Security Strategy in the Community of Madrid, ESICAM179), targeting all the one hundred and seventy-nine municipalities of the Community of Madrid.

== History ==
The medieval kings of León, Castile, and Aragón were often unable to maintain public peace, protective municipal leagues began to emerge in the twelfth century against bandits and other rural criminals, as well as against the lawless nobility or mobilized to support a claimant to the crown. These organizations were individually temporary but became a long-standing fixture of Spain.

The first recorded case of the formation of an hermandad occurred when the towns and the peasantry of the north united to police the pilgrim road to Santiago de Compostela in Galicia, and protect the pilgrims, a major source of regional income, against robber knights. With the countryside virtually everywhere effectively in the hands of nobles, throughout the High Middle Ages such brotherhoods were frequently formed by leagues of towns to protect the roads connecting them. The hermandades were occasionally co-opted for dynastic purposes. They acted to some extent like the Fehmic courts of Germany. Among the most powerful was the league of northern Castilian and Basque ports, the Hermandad de las Marismas: Toledo, Talavera, and Villa Real.

As one of their first acts after the War of the Castilian Succession, Ferdinand and Isabella "brought peace by the brilliant strategy of organizing rather than eliminating violence;" they established a centrally organized and efficient Holy Hermandad (Santa Hermandad) with themselves at its head. They adapted the existing form of the hermandad to the purpose of creating a general police force under the direction of officials appointed by themselves, and endowed with large powers of summary jurisdiction, even in capital cases. The rough and ready justice of the Santa Hermandades became famous for brutality. The original hermandades continued to serve as modest local police units until their final suppression in 1835.

=== 20th century ===
The principal forces of public order and security as of 1988 were the Civil Guard, founded in 1844, and the National Police Corps, founded in 1986. The Civil Guard, fortified by nearly a century and a half of tradition, was a highly disciplined paramilitary body with close links to the Spanish army. As it evolved, it served mainly as rural police to protect property and order and to reinforce the authority of the central government.

Under Francisco Franco, a tripartite system of police was formalized: the Civil Guard in rural areas; the Armed and Traffic Police (renamed the National Police in 1979), which fulfilled normal police functions in communities with a population of more than 20,000; and the Higher Police Corps of plainclothes police with responsibility for investigating crimes and political offenses. Separate municipal police forces under the control of local mayors were concerned mainly with traffic control and with enforcement of local ordinances.

The transition from Franco's dictatorship to a system of parliamentary democracy was accompanied by a major effort to bring the forces of law and order and the justice system into harmony with the new political era. The police were stripped of most of their military characteristics. The Civil Guard, which maintained order in rural areas and in smaller communities, retained many of its military features, but both the Civil Guard and the police were placed under civilian leadership.

Once dedicated to repressing all evidence of opposition to the Franco regime, the police and the Civil Guard were expected to tolerate forms of conduct previously banned and to protect individual rights conferred by the 1978 Constitution and by subsequent legislation. Members of the Civil Guard continued to be implicated in cases of mistreatment and brutality in the campaign against Basque terrorism. The authorities had, however, prosecuted many civil guard officers for such infractions, with the result that by 1988 fewer violations of legal norms were being recorded.

Reforms of the judicial system included appointments of judges by a body insulated from political pressures and increased budgets to enable courts to deal with a chronic backlog of criminal hearings. The penal code was being modernized to bring it into conformity with the new Constitution. Some progress had been made in ensuring that defendants had effective legal representation and that they received speedier trials. Nevertheless, antiquated procedures and the escalation of crime continued to generate huge delays in the administration of justice, with the result that as much as half of the prison population in 1986 consisted of accused persons still awaiting trial.

During the Franco era, the police had been regarded as a reactionary element, associated in the public mind with internal surveillance and political repression. The Civil Guard and the Armed and Traffic Police were legally part of the armed forces, and their senior officers were drawn from the army. The 1978 Constitution effects the separation of the police from the military, and it emphasizes that one of the functions of the police is to safeguard personal liberties. Article 104 of the 1978 Constitution states that, "The Security Corps and Forces, responsible to the Government, shall have as their mission the protection of the free exercise of rights and liberties and the guaranteeing of the safety of citizens."

Although considerably delayed, a subsequent statute, the Organic Law on the Security Corps and Forces, was enacted in March 1986 to incorporate the mandate of the Constitution to redefine the functions and the operating principles of the police forces. With its passage, the final legal steps had been taken to make the police system conform to the requirements of the democratic regime, although most observers concluded that it would be years before the reforms were fully in effect.

The new organic law provided a common ethical code for police practices, affirmed trade union rights, recast the role of the judicial police serving under the courts and the public prosecutors, combined the uniformed and the non-uniformed police into the single National Police Corps, and redefined the missions and the chains of command of the various police bodies. The Civil Guard remained a separate paramilitary force, although in operational matters it was under the direction of the Ministry of Interior rather than the Ministry of Defence.

In time of war or emergency, it would revert to the authority of the minister of defence. In 1986 a new post of secretary of state for security was created in the Ministry of Interior to coordinate the activities of the National Police Corps and the Civil Guard. The National Police Corps functioned under the directives of the director-general of the National Police Corps, but local supervision was exercised by civil governors of the provinces where police forces served.

Although their powers were, in most cases, quite limited, the local police services of individual towns and cities complemented the work of the National Police Corps, dealing with such matters as traffic, parking, monitoring public demonstrations, guarding municipal buildings, and enforcing local ordinances. They also collaborated with the National Police Corps by providing personnel to assist in crowd control. Numbering about 37,000 individuals in 1986, the local police were generally armed only with pistols, although many smaller local police forces, particularly in Guipúzcoa, have continued to maintain an unarmed policing tradition, although this has met legal challenges recently and Eibar is set to have a fully armed local police force in 2020, with the 40 remaining unarmed police forces in the province likely to follow.

Under the Statutes of Autonomy of 1979, the Basque Country and Catalonia were granted authority to form or restitute their own regional police forces (Ertzaintza and Mossos d'Esquadra, respectively). Subsequently, ten of the seventeen autonomous regions were extended the right to create their own forces, but, as of 1988, only three areas—the Basque Country, Catalonia, and Navarre—had developed regional police units. The 1986 organic law defined limits of competence for regional police forces, although the restrictions imposed did not apply to the existing forces in Navarre and the Basque Country (who had already replaced duties from the Civil Guard, such as intercity traffic enforcement) and applied only in part to those in Catalonia.

Under the law, regional police could enforce regional legislation, protect regional offices, and, in cooperation with national forces, could police public places, control demonstrations and crowds, and perform duties in support of the judiciary. A Security Policy Council was established at the national level to ensure proper coordination with the new regional forces, which, as of 1986, numbered about 4,500 officers.

In 1995, the basque police acquired public safety competencies in all of its territory and replaced the National Police and the Civil Guard in most aspects.

=== 21st century ===
Current police distribution in Spain.* Dark orange: autonomous communities that have their own regional police that take over duties from the National Police and Civil Guard.* Light orange: communities that by law are allowed to create their police and have shared units with the National Police. * Grey: communities (alongside the light orange ones) where the National Police and the Civil Guard possess all policing duties.

In 2000, the catalan police acquired intercity traffic enforcement duties from the Civil Guard. And, in 2008, it acquired public safety competencies in all of its territory. From that year, the National Police and Civil Guard in the Basque Country and Catalonia only handle documentation expedition, immigration enforcement, coastal protection and ports and airports protection.

In 2008, the Canary Islands created its own regional police aswell (Canary Police General Corps), however to this day it has not replaced the national police forces and acts as a cooperation agent.

During the 2017 Spanish constitutional crisis, a large number of National Police and Civil Guard officers were deployed to Catalonia to stop the independence referendum. The national forces faced several accusations of repression and police brutality. 1.066 people resulted injured and 633 reported the police. At least 95 police officers were investigated, but were later granted amnesty by the Spanish government.

After the general election of 2023, the progressive party PSOE required the votes from the small-sized regional parties in order to form government. Among other agreements, the party agreed to transfer more competencies and give more duties to the regional police forces.

Following Pedro Sánchez re-election, between 2024 and 2025, the Spanish Government announced it would transfer maritime policing, protection of ports and airports and immigration enforcement to the basque and catalan police, implying the practical complete disappeareance of the National Police and the Civil Guard from Catalonia and the Basque Country. These agreements were heavily critiqued by nationalist parties and national police forces unions. Even though these agreements were registered as law proposals, they have not been passed yet due to legal and parliamentary disputes.

In 2025, the navarrese police acquired intercity traffic enforcement duties from the Civil Guard, after a polemic period of judicial disputes.

== Firearms ==
All Spanish police officers carry firearms while on duty and are also allowed to carry off-duty. Specialized units from national and autonomous forces are usually authorised to carry long weapons.

Police officers, alongside Armed Forces officers, are the only ones that possess the highest Firearm License in Spain (Type A).

Model	Type	Origin	Main users
Manurhin MR73	Revolver	France	Grupo Especial de Operaciones
Heckler & Koch USP Compact	Semi-automatic pistol	Germany	Cuerpo Nacional de Policía, Servicio de Vigilancia Aduanera, Ertzaintza, Cuerpo General de Policía Canaria, Mossos d'Esquadra, Policía Municipal de Madrid
Heckler & Koch P30	Semi-automatic pistol	Germany	Mossos d'Esquadra, Grupo Especial de Operaciones
Walther P99	Semi-automatic pistol	Germany	Guàrdia Urbana de Barcelona, Policía Municipal
SIG Sauer P226	Semi-automatic pistol	Germany	Policía Municipal of Bilbao, Grupo Especial de Operaciones
SIG Sauer P320	Semi-automatic pistol	Germany	Grupo Especial de Operaciones
Glock	Semi-automatic pistol	Austria	Policía Foral, Policía Municipal, Mossos d'Esquadra, Unidad Especial de Intervención
FN Five-seveN	Semi-automatic pistol	Belgium	Mossos d'Esquadra
Beretta 92	Semi-automatic pistol	Italy	Guardia Civil
EMTAN Ramon	Semi-automatic pistol	Israel	Guardia Civil
Heckler & Koch MP5	Submachine gun	Germany	Standard issue
Heckler & Koch MP7	Submachine gun	Germany	Grupo Especial de Operaciones, Unidad Especial de Intervención, Mossos d'Esquadra
FN P90	Submachine gun	Belgium	Grupo Especial de Operaciones, Unidad Especial de Intervención, Mossos d'Esquadra
CZ Scorpion Evo 3 A1	Submachine gun	Czech Republic	Grupo Especial de Operaciones
Heckler & Koch G36	Assault rifle	Germany	Standard issue
Remington 870	Shotgun	United States	Standard issue

== Elite intervention units ==
National and autonomous level police forces have elite tactical intervention units for high-risk situations. These units are characterized by their discretion, extensive tactical training, high firearms management skills and involvement in important police operations.

Force	Unit name
National Police	Grupo Especial de Operaciones (GEO)
Civil Guard	Unidad Especial de Intervención (UEI)
Ertzaintza	Berrozi Berezi Taldea (BBT)
Mossos d'Esquadra	Grup Especial d'Intervenció (GEI)
Policía Foral	Grupo de Intervenciones Especiales (GIE)
Policía Canaria	None -

== Defunct police agencies ==
- Carabineros de España
- Security and Assault Corps - Riot police of the Second Spanish Republic.
- National Republican Guard - Replaced the Guardia Civil in republican controlled areas during the Spanish Civil War.
- Armed Police Corps - Enforced public order during the Francoist regime.
- General Police Corps - Enforced investigation and political repression during the Francoist regime.
- Cuerpo Superior de Policía - Undercover police during the Transition period.
- Policia Territorial - Law enforcement in the former Spanish Sahara.
- Cuerpo de Vigilantes de Caminos (Corps of Road Guards)

== See also ==
- Crime in Spain
- Police ranks of Spain
