= Municipal police (Spain) =

Police force in Spain organized at the municipal level

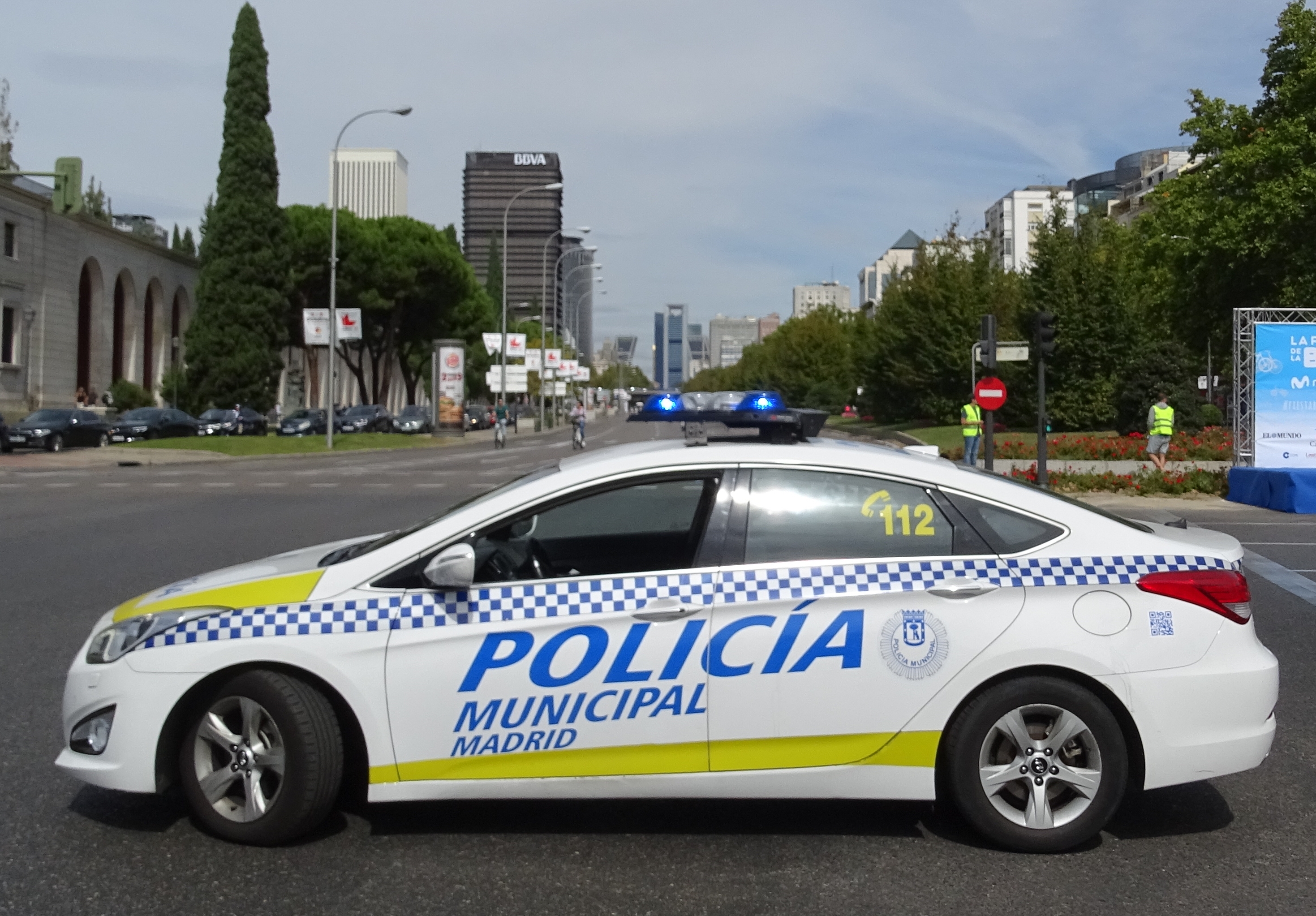
Hyundai i40 of the Policía Municipal de Madrid

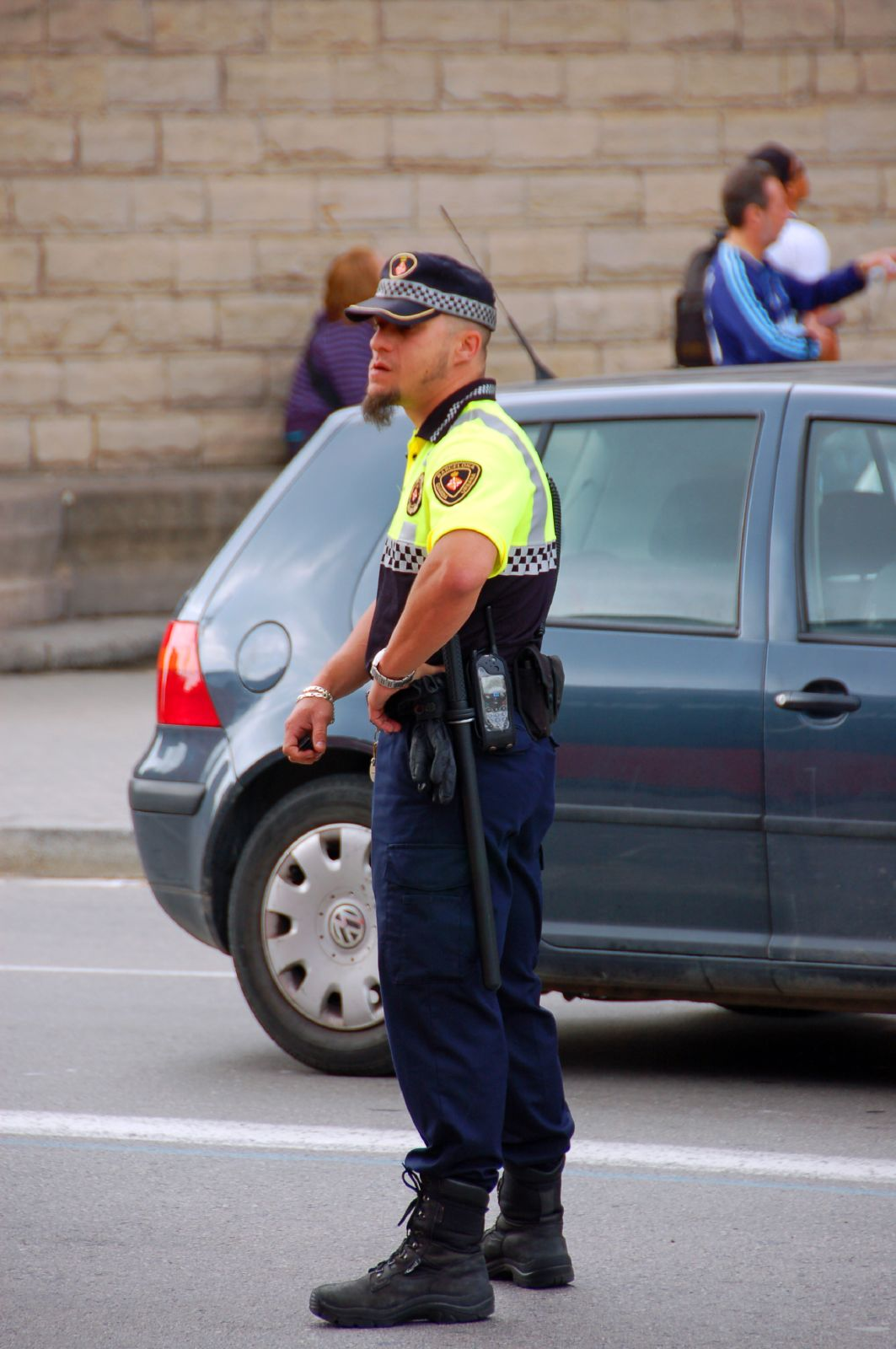
Guàrdia Urbana Barcelona police officer

In Spanish towns and cities, the Policia Municipal (Municipal Police), also known as the Policia Local or Guardia Urbana, is a police force organized at the municipal level. As of 2024, Spain has more than 75,000 local police officers distributed among all the autonomous communities. Municipal police officers are armed.

Municipal police are authorized in every town and city of 5,000 or more people. The Policía Municipal de Madrid is the largest force (~5.850 officers), followed by the Guàrdia Urbana de Barcelona (~3.500 officers). In towns and villages that are too small to organize a municipal force, the function is performed by the Guardia Civil or by the Autonomous Community force. The municipal police have complete powers regarding citizen security and use of force; they work together in all types of operations with the national police and civil guard.

== Local police in Spain ==
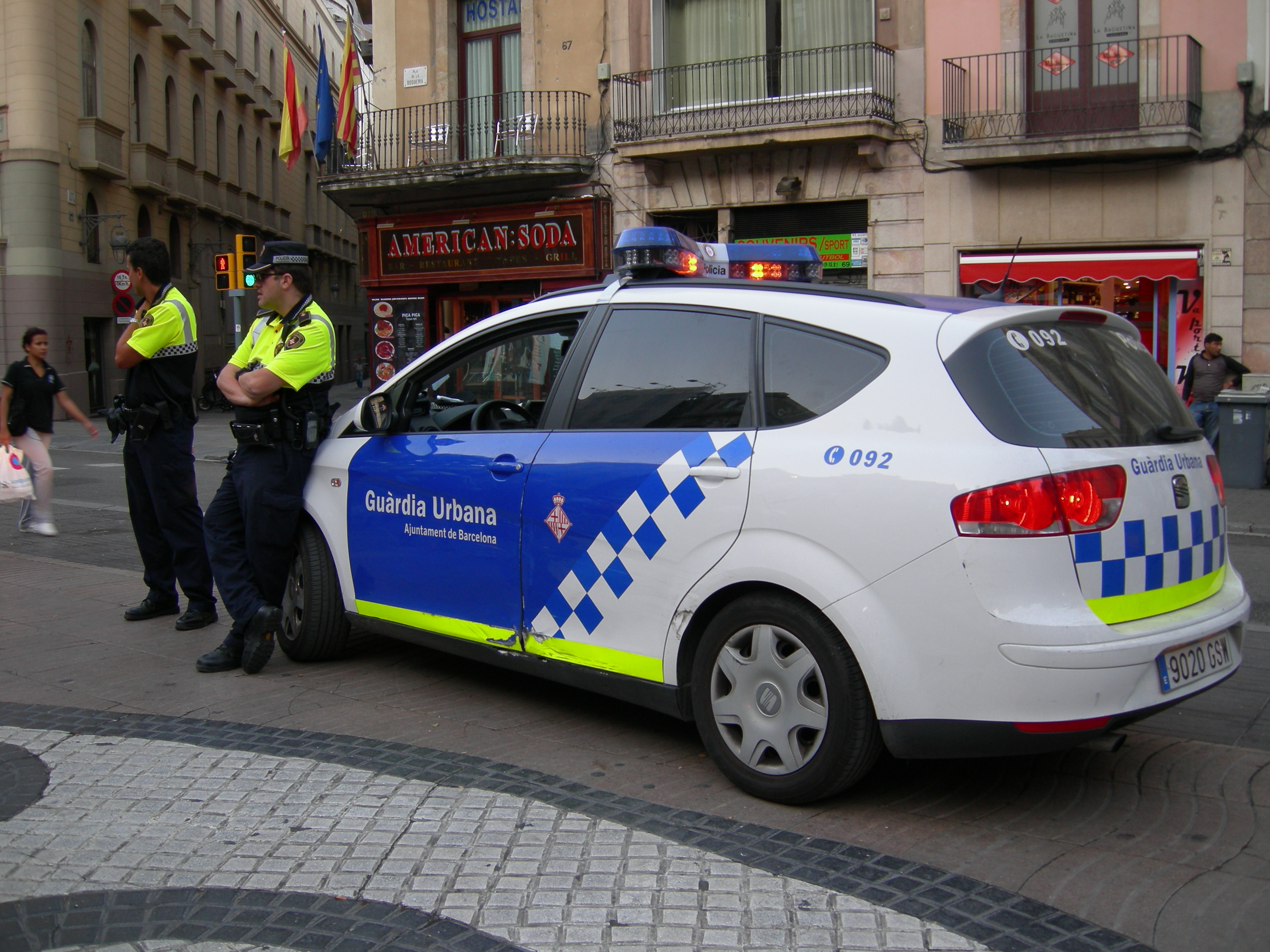
Barcelona Urban Guard SEAT Altea

In Spain, there are the following local police bodies, whose names depend on the institutional tradition of each place:

- Guàrdia Urbana de Barcelona
- Policía Municipal de Madrid
- Policía Local Málaga
- Udaltzaingoa en País Vasco
- Policía Municipal de Pamplona
- Policía Local de Albacete
- Policía Local de Santander
- Policía Local de Murcia
- Policía Municipal de Valladolid
- Policía Local de Gijón

Forces also exist in other municipalities. According to the provisions of Royal Legislative Decree 781/1986, of April 18, which approves the Consolidated Text of the current legal provisions regarding the Local Regime, the fourth transitional provision states, "The Local Police will only exist in municipalities with a population greater than 5,000 inhabitants, unless the Ministry of Territorial Administration authorizes its creation in those with a lower census."

== See also ==
- BESCAM
- ESICAM
