= Policía Municipal de Madrid =

Spanish police force

Madrid Municipal Police Policía Municipal de Madrid
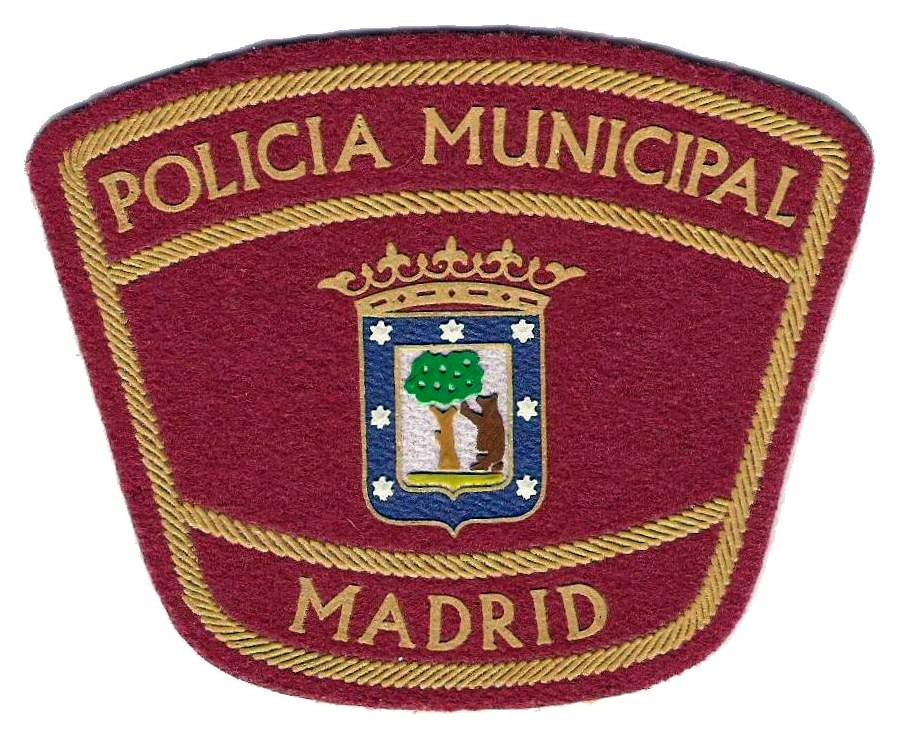
- Common name: Policía
- Abbreviation: PMM

Jurisdictional structure
- Operations jurisdiction: Madrid, Community of Madrid, Spain
- Governing body: City Council of Madrid
- Constituting instruments: Organic Act 2/1986; Law 4/1992
- General nature: Local civilian police

Operational structure
- Overseen by: Department of Health, Public Safety and Emergencies, Coordination-General of Public Safety and Emergencies
- Headquarters: Avenida Principal 6, Casa de Campo, 28011, Madrid
- Officers: 6,498 (2009)
- Elected officer responsible: Javier Barbero, Councillor of Health, Public Safety and Emergencies
- Agency executive: Teodoro Pérez Garcia, Acting Chief Inspector

Notables
- Anniversary: 24 June

The Policía Municipal de Madrid (English: Madrid Municipal Police) is the municipal police force of the city of Madrid.

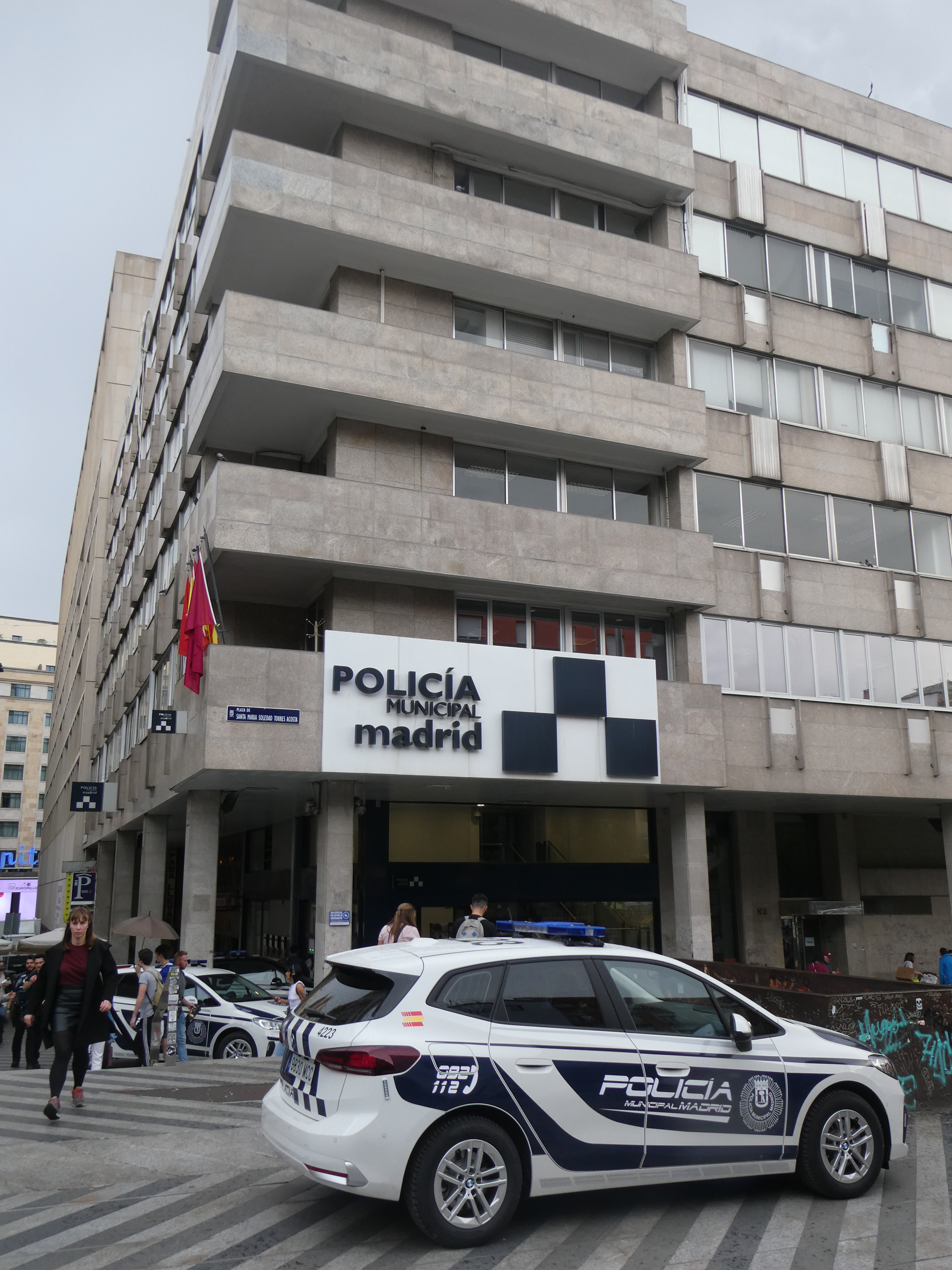
Madrid police building and vehicle

== History ==
The first written reference to an armed force under the protection of the city council named Alguacil dates back to 1202.

The first city police force formed by the mayor of Madrid was founded in 1561, the same year as the establishment of the royal court in Madrid by Philip II. In 1743 the Alguacil enacted regulations describing the group's functions and duties.

In the past, the local police were primarily composed of military people who were wounded during the war. For instance, in 1759 Charles III established the Milicia Urbana (English: urban militia), whose membership was made up of war veterans who could no longer serve in the army. In 1850, the Regulations of the Municipal Guard of Madrid were established. This new police force replaced the Alguacil in performing security services and fell under the jurisdiction of the city council. The character and role of the agency laid the foundation for the Madrid police as it exists today.

By this time the new body began to take shape and new units were created, like the Mounted Section in 1893 and Coach Service in 1914 that regulated traffic cab drivers and the first cars circulating in the municipality. The Municipal Guard Academy was also created in 1906, which provided the knowledge base and experience needed for future officers.

In 1924 the Organic Regulations of Municipal Police were created, which set out the duties and obligations of the members of the agency. Two years before the Spanish Civil War that ravaged the country, the municipal police force continued to grow and make the body section of Drivers in 1934.

A year after the civil war in 1940, the agency further expanded its forces by creating the Brigade Movement. Eight years later, the body underwent another reorganization of staff and services.

In 1952 a cavalry squadron called the Escuadrón de caballería was created, with the mission of patrolling parks and gardens and providing security for protocol services; now they can be seen patrolling parks like the Retiro and the Heart of Madrid.

In 1961 the Municipal Police Academy in Madrid was created, governed by its own rules and where future police officers were trained in law enforcement and prepared to be an active part of the agency.

Women entered service with the police in 1972, through a selective process different from that for men. Created in 1972, the Fifth Joint Traffic Association which was commanded by female commanders saw female officers directing traffic in the Plaza de Cibeles, among other places. It was not until 1980 when the Association was integrated into the larger agency.

In 1978 Spain became a democracy, and with it the establishment of the Constitution. The police powers were regulated in Article 104, which details the protection of the free exercise of citizens' rights and freedoms and ensuring public safety. The formalization of the modern Security Forces was established in 1986 with the Law of Security Forces. In the new model, the police are committed to basic principles of action and governance. This began a major process of modernization that expanded and rejuvenated the agency's agenda, and also provided it with better material resources.

In 1985 a new Organic Regulation of Municipal Police was created, but with the approval of the Law of Coordination of the local police of the Community of Madrid. This was further modified with the regulations of the Madrid Municipal Police in 1995.

Currently, police cadets do not receive their training in the Corps Academy, but at the Local Police Academy of the Community of Madrid in Tres Cantos.

The Center for Integrated Security and Emergency Training (CIFSE) is where members of the Madrid Municipal Police along with the rest of the Municipality Emergency Corps may continue their education during their careers, in various instructional courses.

The current sidearm is the Heckler & Koch USP, chambered in 9×19mm.

== Units ==
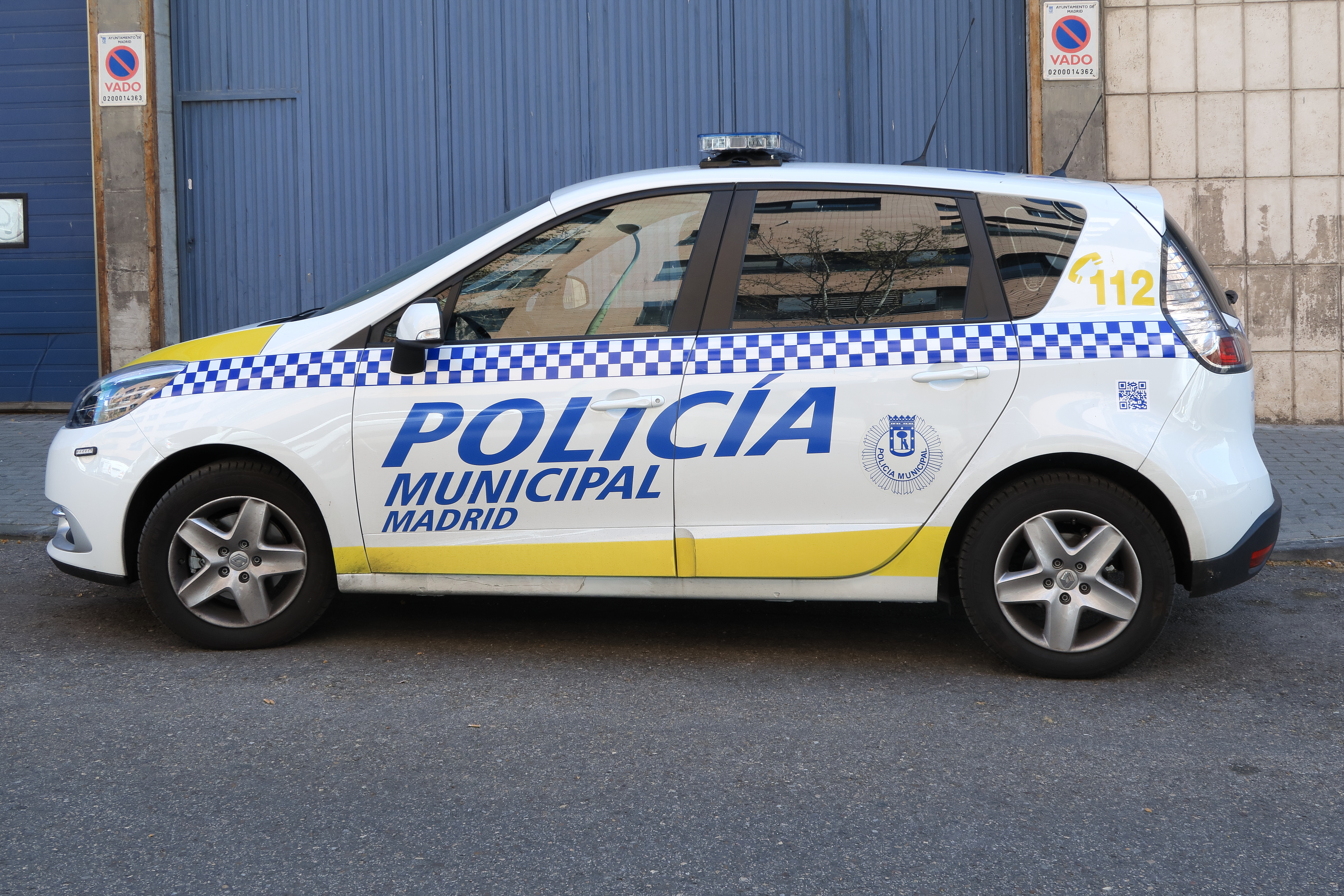
Renault Scénic III in post-2016 livery

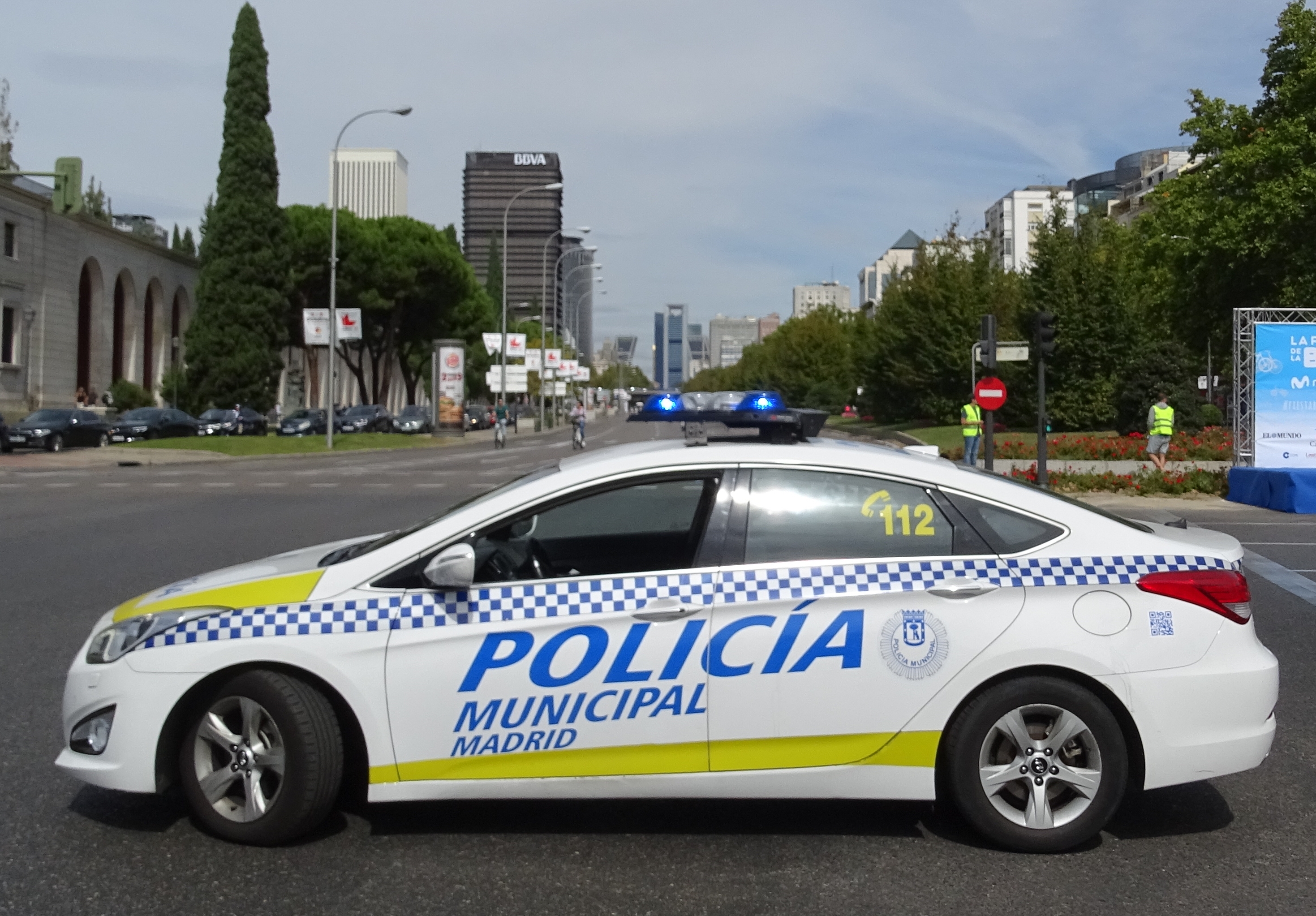
Municipal police Hyundai i40 in Madrid, Spain

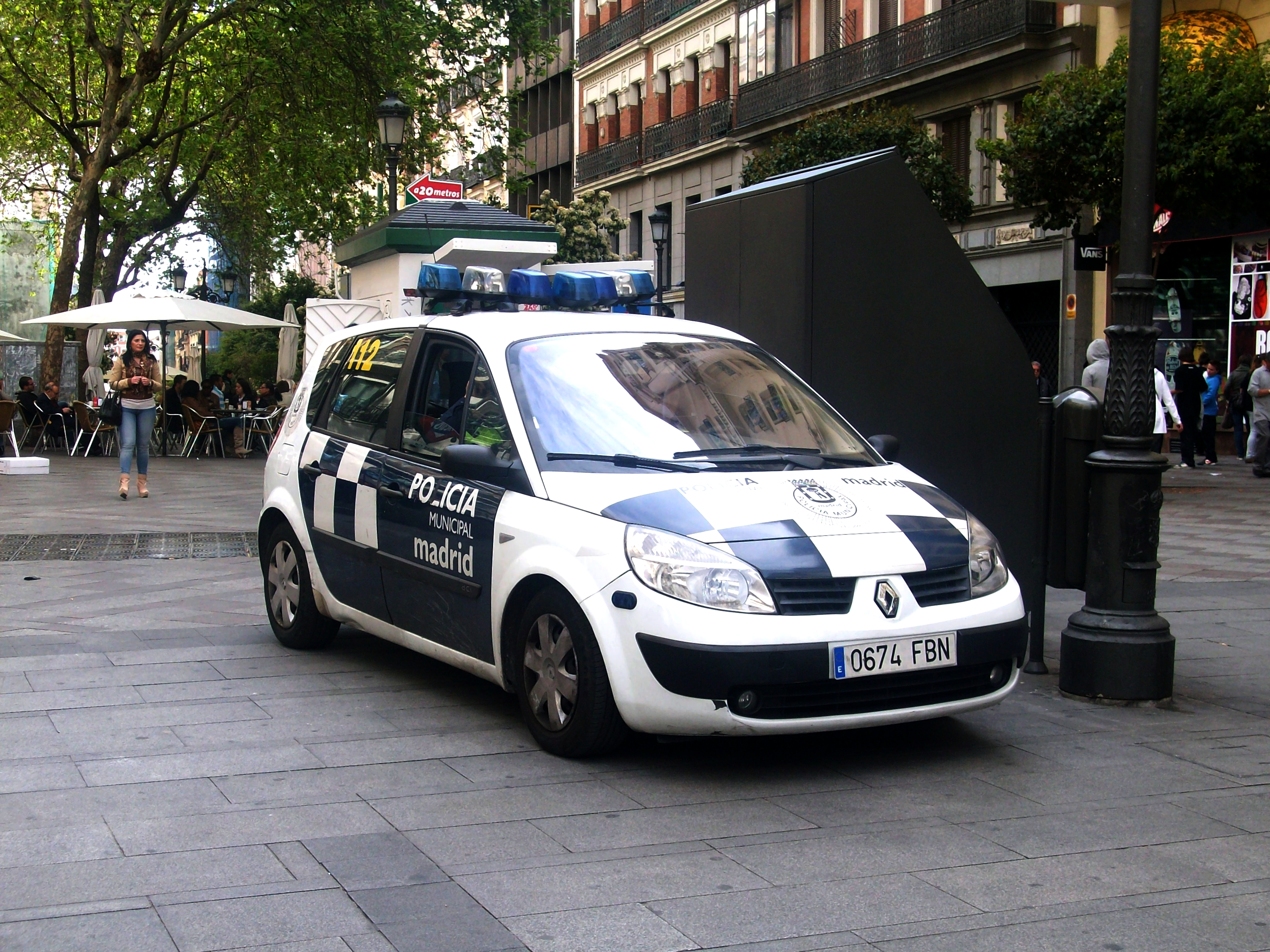
Renault Scénic II

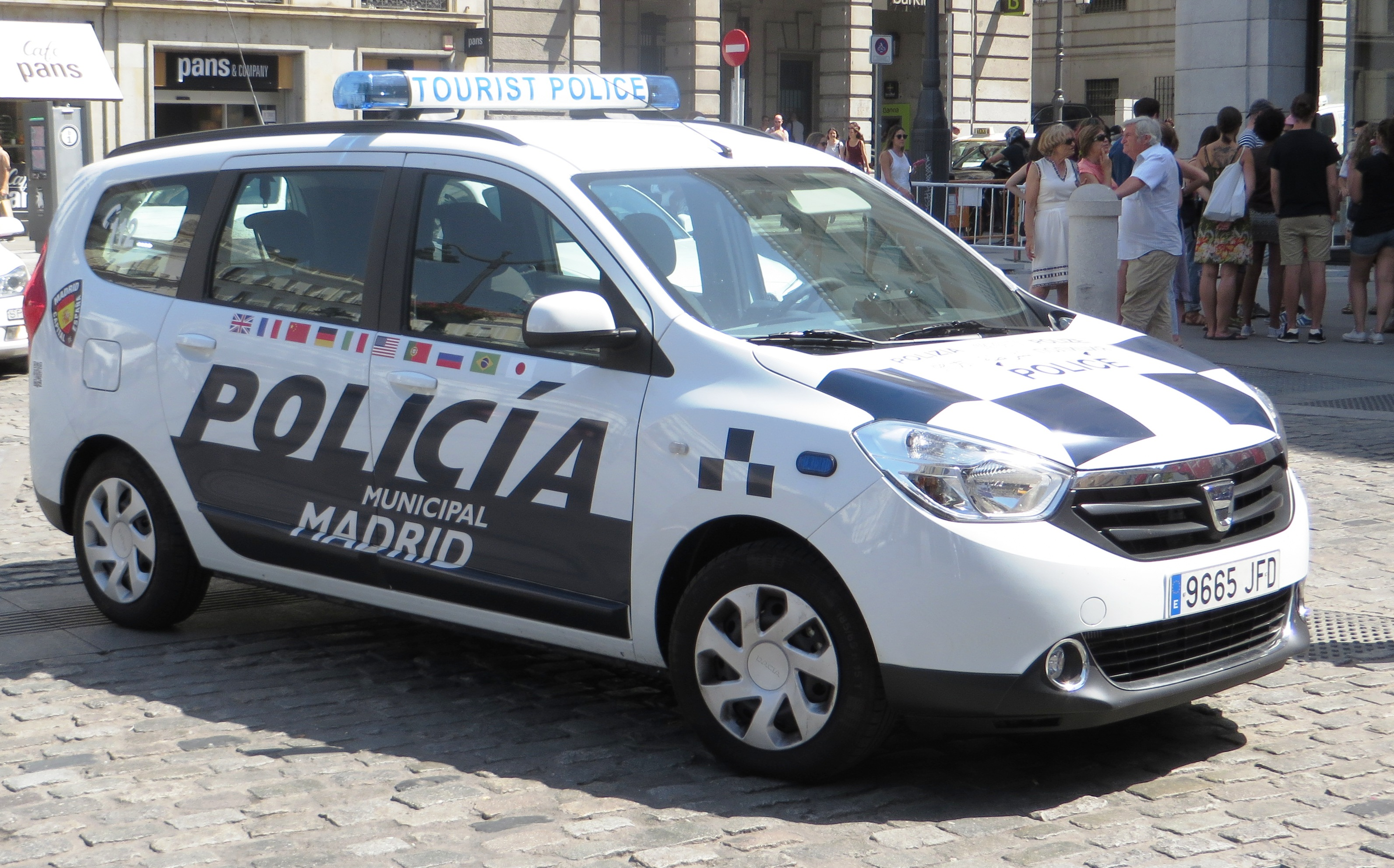
Dacia Lodgy

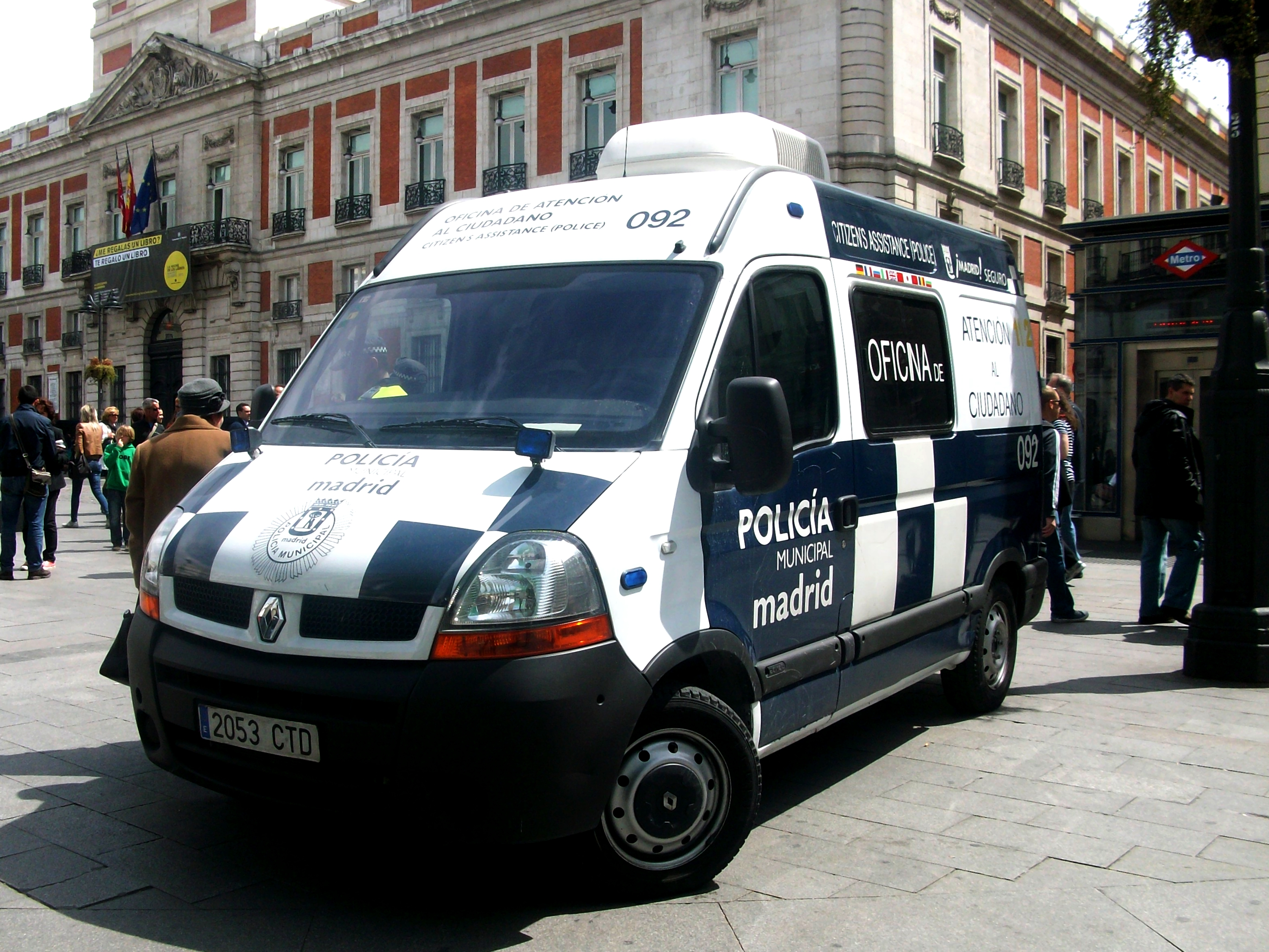
Renault Master

Operating units are of two types: regional and specialized. Each of the 21 districts of Madrid has a Municipal Police Unit under the command of an officer.

The district units are primarily responsible for monitoring public spaces, preventing criminal acts, and carry out the duties of administrative policing and regulating the movement, with the assistance of mobility agents. All of them also have a group of tutor agents, dedicated to the protection of minors and assurance of safety in schools, and Citizen Service Offices, which are cater to the demands of the residents in safety. The different units are arranged in the sub-inspectorates district zone, which in turn are grouped into two Territorial inspections.

The Inspection Operations Center includes several units, organized into sub-inspectorates, specializing in various issues of public safety. The Central Security units are support units and district units are also specialized in improving public safety, improved quality of life and living in the city by the mass control and securing of public spaces.

The Central Sub-inspection of the Judicial Police coordinates all activities of the Municipal Police Force in the execution of the powers by the judicial police. It is mandated by laws and conventions in force. This also includes the Judicial Coordination Unit attached to the Courts Instruction in Madrid and Central Research Unit to coordinate and support staff, and technical research groups' District Units. It also has a group specializing in security surveillance for different bus lines of the EMT.

The Care Unit and Family Protection specializes in the prevention of domestic violence within families.

The Support Unit and Coordination with the Community Education is a unit specializing in road safety education for schoolchildren, which also teaches driver education at various levels of education, both compulsory and high school and college.

The Environmental Unit is responsible for surveillance to prevent attacks on the natural heritage of Madrid and in general to prevent environmental crime. It also patrols the major parks in Madrid, with a bicycle unit and hybrid vehicles with lower emissions.

The Monitoring and Protection Unit is specifically responsible for the protection of government officials.

The Traffic Services Inspectorate is responsible for road safety. Among other issues, it exercises the powers of the judicial police with traffic matters, and assists with road accidents. It also makes proposals for changes to the management and road signs designed to improve flow and traffic safety in Madrid. It is also responsible for planning campaigns for infringement control and improvement of road safety within the Road Safety Strategy for the City of Madrid and the safety of the authorities in their travels around the city and municipality.

== Functions ==
The local police forces have the following duties:

- Protect local government authorities, and supervision or custody of their buildings and facilities.
- Signal and direct traffic in the urban area, in accordance with the provisions of traffic regulations.
- Direct traffic after accidents within the city limits.
- Administrative Police, with regard to the ordinances and other provisions within the scope of municipal jurisdiction.
- Participate in the functions of the Judicial Police in the manner provided in Article 29.2 of this Act
- Rendering assistance in cases of accident, catastrophe or public calamity, participating, in the manner provided in the Laws, in the implementation of civil protection plans.
- Carry out preventive measures and any other actions to prevent the commission of criminal acts within the framework of cooperation established in Safety Meetings.
- Monitor public places and work with Forces of State Security and the police of the autonomous communities with the maintenance of order for demonstrations and other large concentrations of people, when required to do so.
- Cooperate in the resolution of private disputes when requested to do so.

== Ranks ==
| Categories and ranks | Management | | | | Operations |
|---|---|---|---|---|---|---|---|---|---|
| Policía Municipal de Madrid |
| Policía Municipal de Madrid | Comisario General | Comisario Principal | Comisario | Intendente | Inspector | Subinspector | Oficial | Policía | Alumno |

== Organization ==
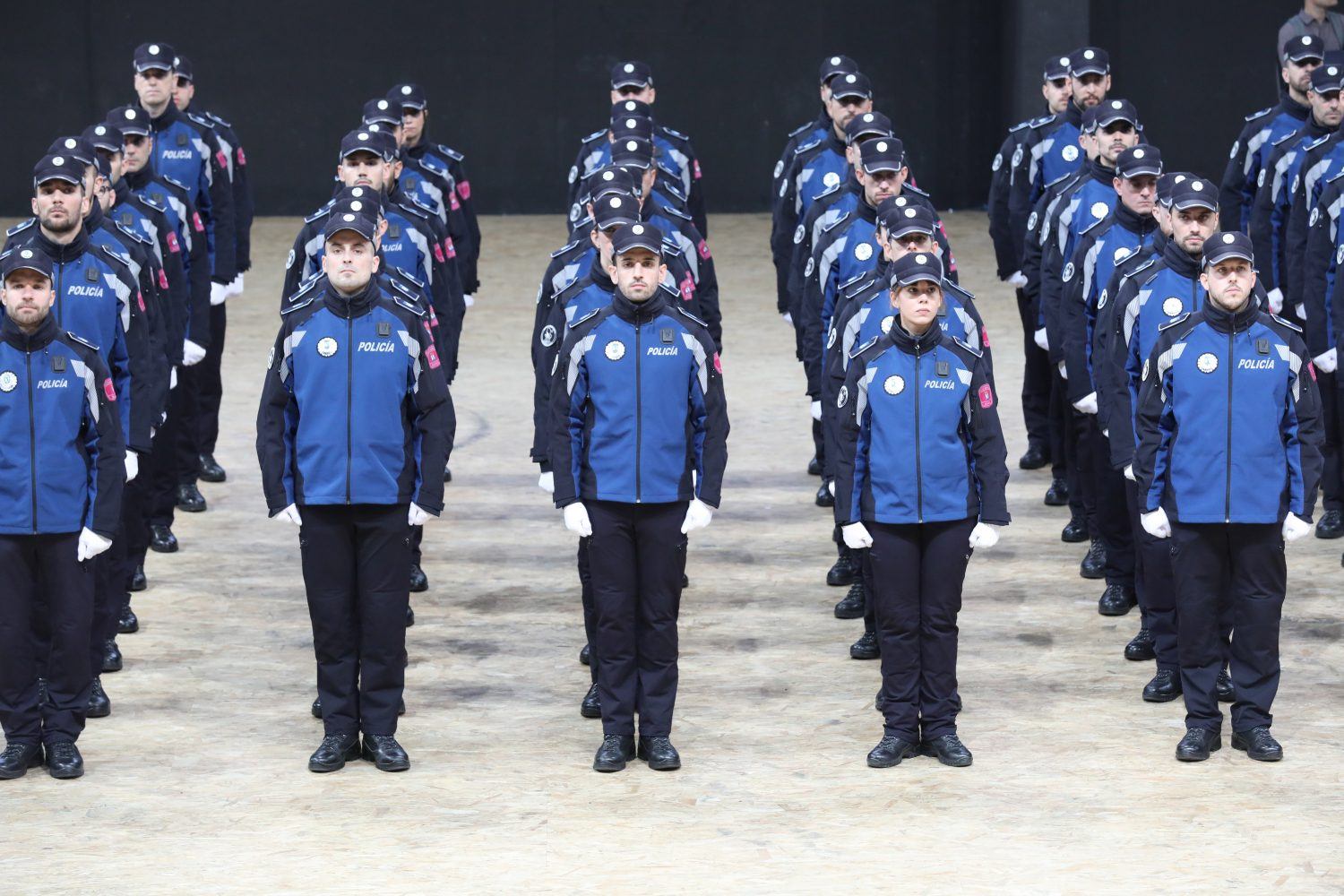
Agents from the 2018 promotion

The General Coordination of Security is responsible for organizing and directing the Municipal Police Unit, proposing and executing the plans of operation and purchase of equipment, review and updating thereof.

The General Security Coordination is formed, among other units in the Directorate General of Security and the Municipal Police.

The head of the Municipal Police Force is vested in its Chief Inspector and Inspections is organized, sub-inspectorates and Units.

Operating Units are of two types: territorial district and specialized. Each of the 21 districts of the capital has a comprehensive Municipal Police Unit under the command of an officer and a sergeant attached. Income and Education

The Municipal Police is divided into two scales, and a Technical Executive, to which any citizen who meets the requirements can be commissioned as an officer after passing the selection process. Once admitted to the Corps, there are internal promotion examinations for promotion to other professional groups in the Municipal Police. To do this an applicant must meet the qualification requirements and seniority required in each case and pass the selection tests established. An applicant must satisfy certain physical requirements and educational qualifications and pass the selection process established. This selection process is a competition in which applicants must pass a series of tests of psychological, physical, and knowledge of the subjects that make up the program. After the opposition stage applicants must pass a Selective Course and finally, a training internship.

== See also ==
- BESCAM
