= ESICAM =

Police assistance fund and program in Madrid, Spain

ESICAM, an initialism for Estrategia de Seguridad Integral en la Comunidad de Madrid whose official initialism is ESICAM179 (English:Integrated Security Strategy in the Community of Madrid), has replaced BESCAM, an initialism for Brigadas Especiales de Seguridad de la Comunidad Autónoma de Madrid (Special Security Brigades for the Autonomous Community of Madrid). Like BESCAM, ESICAM is not a specific police organization but rather a project of the regional government of the Autonomous Community of Madrid which aims to fund local police distributed among the different municipalities of the Community in response to strict technical criteria, with particular emphasis on the population, geographic location or, in the case of those with fewer than 25,000 inhabitants, taking into account the seasonal population increase, or other factors such as low levels of police staffing, industrial development and urban growth. ESICAM provides for the funding by the Madrid Autonomous Community of personnel and material resources necessary to combat dangers. ESICAM179 will reach all 179 municipalities of the Madrid region.

== Objectives ==
The objectives of this plan are the guarantee of public safety as the first responsibility of government and to guarantee the free exercise of citizens' fundamental rights. Unlike the Basque Country, Navarre and Catalonia, the government of Madrid has no power to create a regional police force itself it has signed an agreement with each municipality where ESICAM is deployed. ESICAM is therefore considered part of the local police, although its staff have different uniforms and vehicles and are trained separately.

At an organizational level, ESICAM includes the creation of a Municipal Coordination Center (Centro de Coordinación Municipal - CECOM) that, from the facilities of the Madrid 112 Security and Emergency Agency (Agencia de Seguridad y Emergencias Madrid 112 - ASEM112), will improve coordination between the different security forces operating in the region; Local Police, Forest Agents and State Security Forces and Bodies.

== Implementation ==
The Madrid Region's Executive announced that the Government Council this Tuesday will give the green light to this new plan which, in 2021, will involve the investment of 74 million euros to improve security in the municipalities, a figure practically identical to that which had been spent in the previous years within the framework of the Bescam.
