= Casa de Campo (neighborhood) =

Ward of Madrid in Spain

Coordinates: 40°28′55″N 3°44′33″W

- City neighborhood
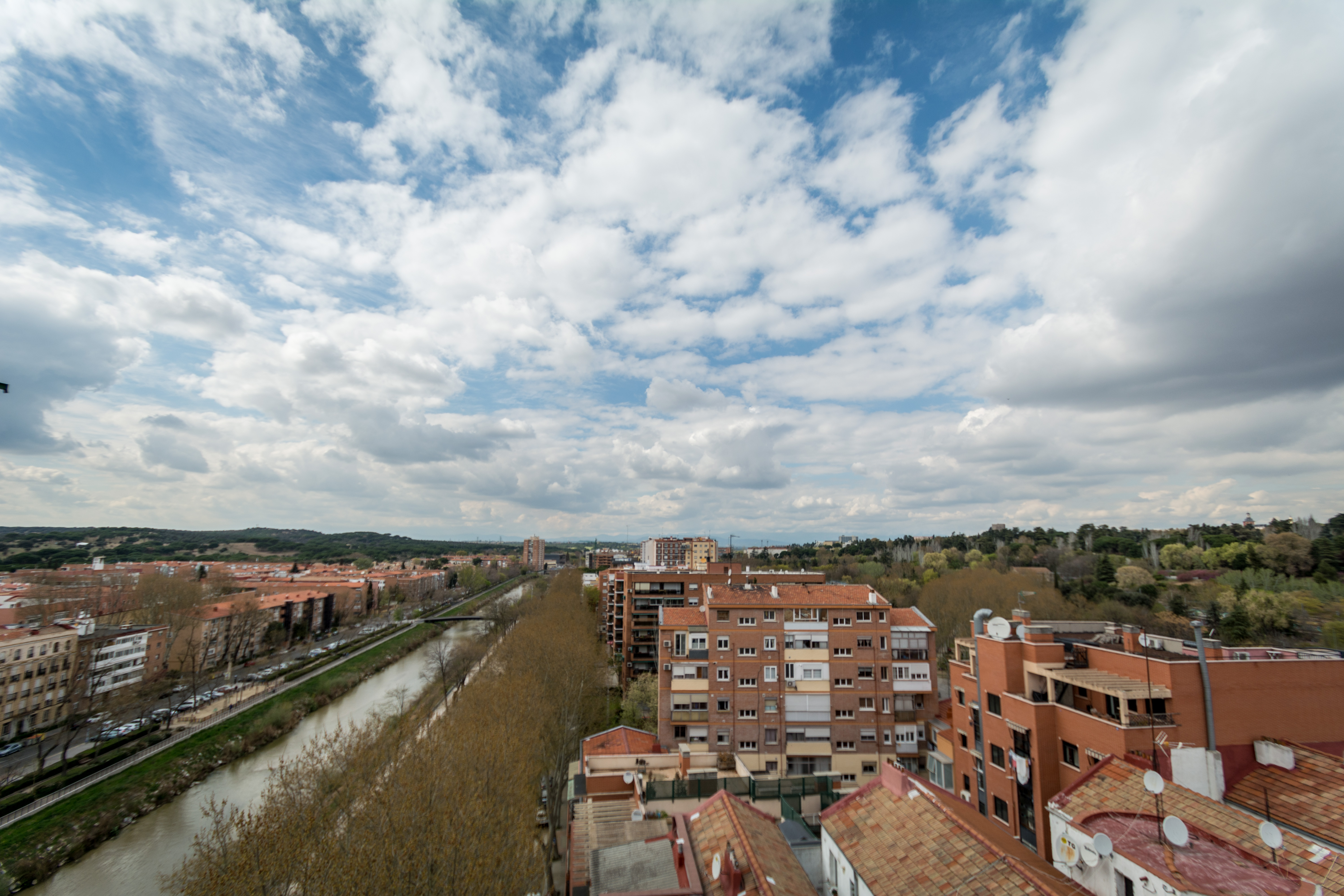
- Interactive map of Casa de Campo
- Country: Spain
- Region: Community of Madrid
- Municipality: Madrid
- District: Moncloa-Aravaca

Casa de Campo ([ˈkasa ðe ˈkampo]) is an administrative neighborhood (barrio) of Madrid, Spain, belonging to the district of Moncloa-Aravaca.
