= BESCAM =

Police assistance fund and program in Madrid, Spain

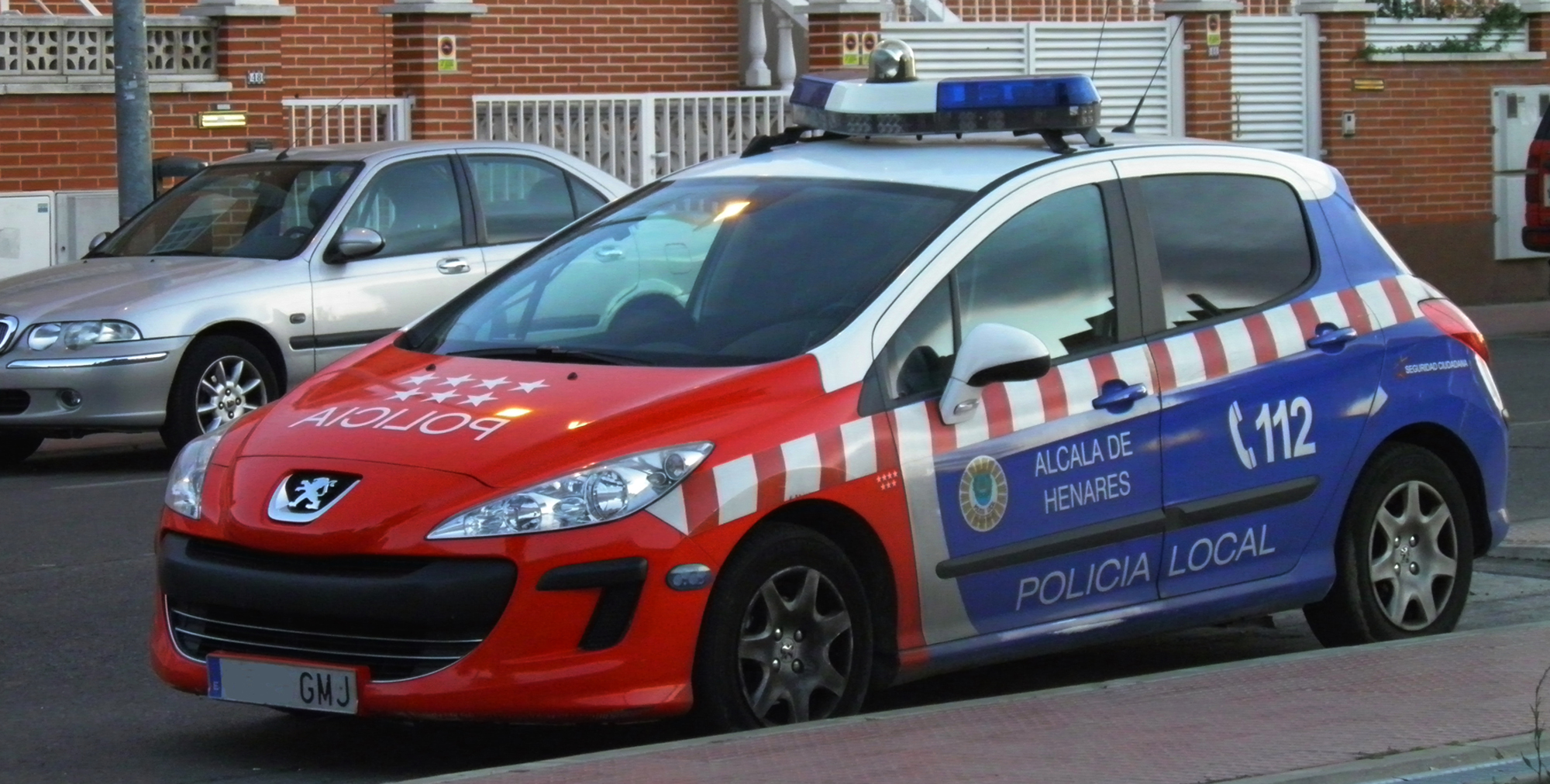
BESCAM, Alcala de Henares

The BESCAM, an acronym for Brigadas Especiales de Seguridad de la Comunidad Autónoma de Madrid (Special Security Brigades for the Autonomous Community of Madrid), is a police body created by the government of the Community of Madrid in Spain. It is not a specific police organization but rather a project of the regional government of the Autonomous Community of Madrid 2500 which aims to fund local police distributed among the different municipalities of the Community in response to strict technical criteria, with particular emphasis on the population, geographic location or, in the case of those with fewer than 25,000 inhabitants, taking into account the seasonal population increase, or other factors such as low levels of police staffing, industrial development and urban growth. In early 2008, 2,500 agents, distributed in 102 locations in the Greater Madrid area that have a local police force, were members of these units.

Unlike the Ertzaintza or the Mossos d'Esquadra, BESCAM is not a full-blown police corps but a series of manpower and equipment contingents assigned to the already existing local police forces. Nonetheless, BESCAM contingents have different uniforms, and their vehicles have different livery to their local forces.

== Establishment ==
BESCAM was created in 2004 by an initiative of the regional government, led by Esperanza Aguirre, and the president of the Federation of Municipalities of Madrid (FMM), Luis Partida, by signing a framework agreement between the Community and the various municipalities, leading to the deployment of the brigades under the control of their respective mayors. The agreement provides for the funding by the Madrid Autonomous Community of personnel and material resources necessary to combat dangers.

== Objectives ==
The objectives of this plan are the guarantee of public safety as the first responsibility of government and to guarantee the free exercise of citizens' fundamental rights.

Since the government of Madrid has no power to create a regional police force itself, unlike the Basque Country, Navarre and Catalonia, the Community of Madrid signed an agreement with each municipality where BESCAM is deployed. BESCAM is therefore considered part of the local police, although its staff have different uniforms and vehicles and are trained separately.

== Characteristics ==
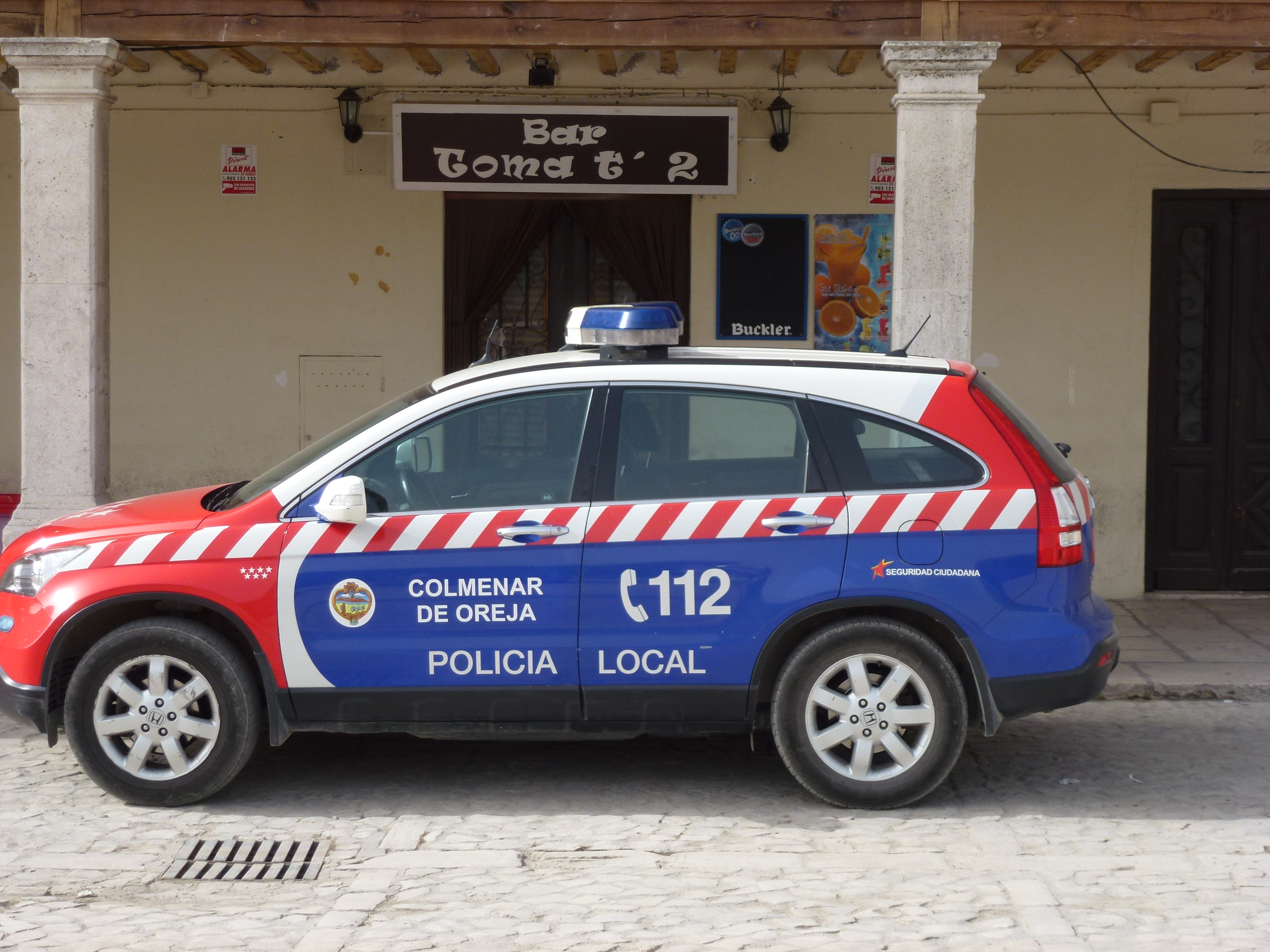
BESCAM Honda CRV of the Colmenar de Oreja Municipal Police

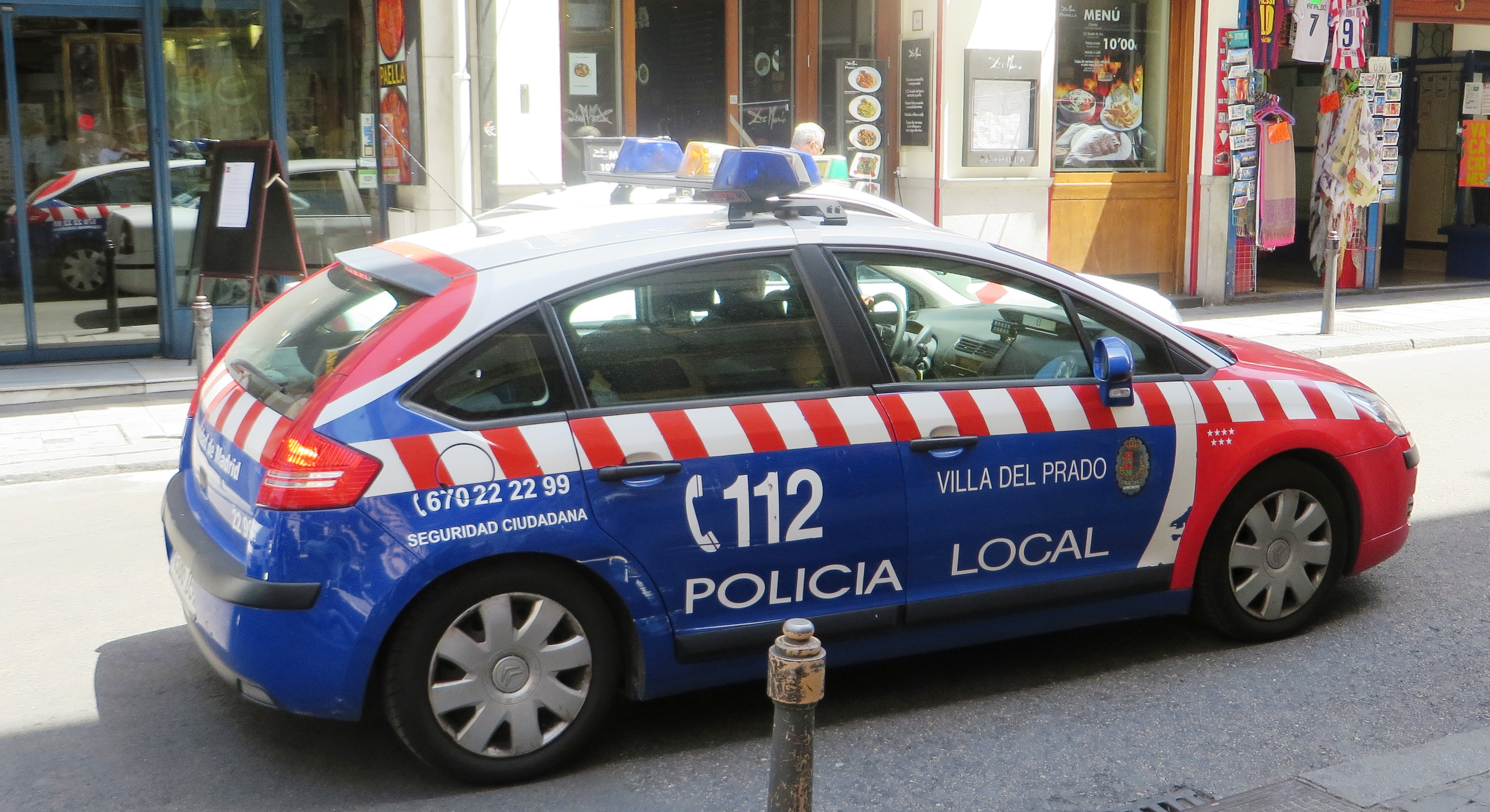
BESCAM Citroen C4 of the Villa del Prado local police.

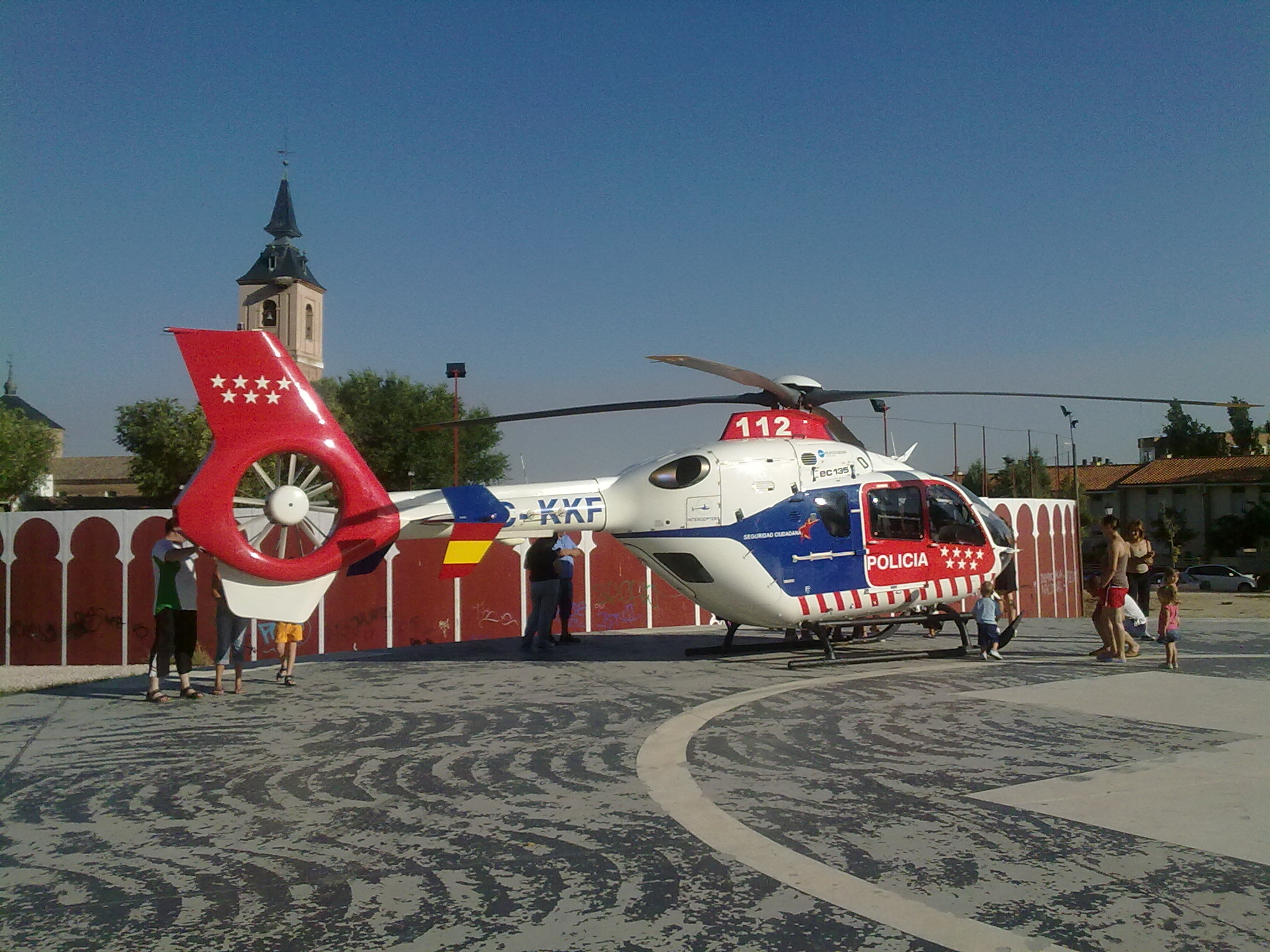
BESCAM Eurocopter EC 135 at Daganzo heliport.

The local police whose posts belong to the BESCAM units are trained at the Police Academy of the Community of Madrid in the same manner as non-BESCAM officers of the municipal police who were not destined exclusively to public safety. BESCAM officers' functions encompass all those functions assigned to the regular police and their uniform and equipment is the same as those used in previous promotions; the salary, working conditions and chain of command are exactly the same as those local police non-BESCAM posts, which results in a consistent service to the public.

This does not affect the current situation, in which each municipality has a different convention, with specific working conditions, salary, equipment, staffing, internal rules, or guidelines when exercising their functions, which may be adapted to the unique characteristics of each municipality, provided they meet basic standards specified in Law 4/92 and the General Security Forces Law 2/1986 of 13 March.

== Development ==
The implementation of BESCAM raised some controversy over whether it was an independent Police force or framed within the existing local police in each municipality. In order to dispel doubts D. Alfredo Prada, deputy vice president of the Community of Madrid and Minister for Justice and Home Affairs said that "BESCAM is a security project, not involving assumption of more powers by the Community, which aims to put 5,500 more police officers on the street. We have signed agreements with the Ministry of Interior for 3,000 new National Police officers, and agreements with mayors for 2,500 new local police officers. The BESCAM is a project by which the Community of Madrid seeks budgetary and political involvement in public safety. But this does not mean a new police force, or a new policing model, or new powers for the Community. We want to find strategies open to external participation in the development of this project. And because security is so important for citizens, one should put aside party political interests and reach a consensus. "

=== Stages of development ===
Phase 0 pilot - began in 2004 with 60 members in the operational base of Móstoles, a pioneer in the implementation of this project.

Phase 1 - In 2005 the first phase of the Public Safety of the Community of Madrid Project was begun, with 570 agents and 16 municipalities: El Escorial, Boadilla del Monte, Arganda, Colmenar Viejo, San Fernando de Henares, Rivas- Vaciamadrid, the Alamo, Parla, Coslada, Pozuelo de Alarcón, Alcobendas, Torrejón de Ardoz, Alcalá de Henares, Fuenlabrada, Getafe, Alcorcón and Leganes . Each of these councils was assigned a BESCAM group.

Phase 2 - Also in 2005, there were a total of 370 more agents, distributed among 15 municipalities: Algete, Aranjuez, Galapagar, Guadarrama, Mejorada del Campo, Pinto, Torrelodones, Tres Cantos, Valdemoro, Villanueva de la Cañada, Villaviciosa de Odon, Collado Villalba, Las Rozas de Madrid, Majadahonda and San Sebastian de los Reyes .

Phase 3 - Started on November 3, 2005, adding 2 new locations, Ciempozuelos and Navalcarnero, and 440 new police officers to reinforce 34 existing operational bases.

Phase 4 - In November 2006, new recruits entered the Police academy who would subsequently join the police units in San Martin de la Vega, Humanes de Madrid, El Escorial, Alpedrete, Meco, Villanueva del Pardillo, Moralzarzal, Velilla de San Antonio, Valdemorillo, Arroyomolinos, San Agustin de Guadalix, Brunete, Griñón, Soto del Real, Cercedilla, Robledo de Chavela and Valdemoro .

Phase 5 - Throughout 2007, the Public Security project was extended to 102 municipalities in the region. Thus, added to the fifty locations already included in this project, were 52 further municipalities, in which public security was provided by 500 local police officers. The Regional Government thus meets the Government's commitment to roll out the Regional Public Safety Project in all those towns in the region with local police forces (except the capital), thus providing the people of Madrid with 2,500 new police officers.

The agreement is in effect for the next 15 years until 2018, and will be renewed automatically for the same period.

== Project termination ==
On December 30, 2020, the end of the BESCAM project was announced to give way to the new Integral Security Strategy in the Community of Madrid: the ESICAM179, as an umbrella for action on a medium-term horizon, aimed at the one hundred and seventy-nine municipalities of the Community of Madrid.
