= Ciutat Morta =

2013 documentary by Xavier Artigas and Xapo Ortega

- Promotional release poster
- Directed by: Xavier Artigas; Xapo Ortega
- Written by: Mariana Huidobro; Jesús Rodríguez
- Produced by: Metromuster
- Cinematography: Xavier Artigas; Xapo Ortega; Marielle Paon
- Release date: 2013
- Running time: 123 minutes
- Country: Spain
- Languages: Catalan; Spanish
- Budget: 4,700 euros

Ciutat Morta ([siwˈtat ˈmɔr.tə], "Dead City") is a 2013 Catalan documentary about the 4F case, directed by Xavier Artigas and Xapo Ortega. The film covers the repercussions of the events of February 4, 2006, when a Guàrdia Urbana officer in Barcelona was grievously injured and several people were arrested. This resulted in a long court-case and ultimately four people were convicted and imprisoned, one of whom committed suicide.

Ciutat Morta argues that the convictions were unjust and reflect general trends of police prejudice, violence and impunity to prosecution. The film generated controversy on its release, with a local media blackout. Catalan television (TV3) refused to produce or screen the film until 2015, after it had received positive reactions at film festivals. When it was eventually televised, five minutes had been cut by order of the court. Ciutat Morta was produced with volunteer labour by the directors after crowdfunding 4,700 euros, with La Directa staff pursuing the investigation. It caused a review of the convictions, none of which were overturned.

== Synopsis ==
On the night of February 4, 2006, there was a rave in a squatted building in the Ciutat Vella district of Barcelona. When a Guàrdia Urbana (municipal police) patrol passed by, objects including flowerpots were thrown from the roof. A police officer not wearing a helmet was hit on the head by a projectile and grievously wounded. Three Latin American men holding Spanish passports (Alex Cisternas, Rodrigo Lanza and Juan Pintos) were immediately arrested on the street and allegedly mistreated at the police station. Pintos says the police broke his hand and a picture of Lanza shows him with his arm in a sling and a black eye. Two other young people, Patricia Heras and Alfredo Pestana, were cycling in the area together on one bike and went to the hospital after crashing. Having taken the three arrestees to the same hospital to treat their wounds, the police decided to also arrest Heras and Alfredo, having profiled them as queer and punk, because of an allegedly suspicious text message on Heras' mobile phone. Heras always maintained that she had nothing to do with the incident. In total nine people were arrested that night.

These events became the basis of the 4F case (named for "4 February"), in which the three men were remanded for two years then convicted, Pestana was convicted then pardoned and Heras committed suicide, having received a sentence of three years' imprisonment. The documentary investigates whether those convicted were the actual perpetrators of the offences; it suggests that they were on trial more for reasons such as their ancestry, the way they looked and their proximity to the events. It features the poetry of Heras, read by an ex-partner, and interviews Rodrigo Lanza and Juan Pintos. It is noted that in 2011 two of the arresting policemen were convicted of torturing a young Latin American student who was the son of a diplomat and in a fragment later cut from the film by order of the court before it was shown on Catalan television, it is alleged that the Guàrdia Urbana chief of information told falsehoods about what happened that night. Further, an anonymous witness claims that they could identify the person who actually did throw the flowerpot from the rooftop. Broadening its theme, the film examines police violence and the political atmosphere of a gentrifying Barcelona, the "dead city" of the title, in which the streets are cleaned of people deemed undesirable by the city council.

== Themes ==
The original title of the film was Poeta muerta. 4F: Ni oblit ni perdo (Dead poet. 4F: Neither forget nor forgive), with the focus intended to be on Patricia Heras, the poet who killed herself after being convicted. The directors Xavier Artigas and Xapo Ortega then changed the title to Ciutat Morta (Dead city) to broaden the themes of the film and so that they could enter it into film festivals. By following the events of the 4F case, the film argues that the convicted people were not responsible for the police officer getting injured, since he was hit by a flowerpot thrown from a roof and they were all on the street (Heras and Pestana were not even near the building in question). Two of the three arrested men (Rodrigo Lanza and Juan Pintos) give oral testimony alleging they were subject to racist abuse and beatings at the police station. The film argues that the convicted people were victims of prejudice, being insulted as "sudacas di mierda" for being Spanish of Latin American ancestry, being judged on their alternative looks and their hairstyles (Lanza having dreadlocks, Heras having a Cyndi Lauper style haircut) and being regarded as worthless for being squatters and gothic punks.

Ciutat Morta focuses on human rights abuses in the 4F case and broadens the theme to discuss police violence, gentrification and neoliberal discourses in Barcelona. Since the 1992 Olympics, Barcelona had promoted itself as a tourist location and the directors wanted to create a counter-narrative. They saw the documentary as activism, tied in with the 15M movement and its critique of austerity measures. The directors Xavier Artigas and Xapo Ortega had been inspired by the success of a documentary called Perdre un ull in Catalan, Perder un ojo in Spanish or To lose an eye in English, which received 250,000 views online in 48 hours and created publicity around the issue of people being blinded by police using rubber bullets to control crowds. Artigas commented to El Mundo "it's a documentary that comes out of rage" and said it was about a city "that thinks it is progressive but allows these things to happen".

== Production ==
Patricia Heras committed suicide in April 2011 by throwing herself off a seven-storey balcony. The following month, Xavier Artigas and Xapo Ortega met at the occupied Plaça de Catalunya at the beginning of the 15M movement and discussed making a short film in tribute to Heras. They decided to produce the film themselves under the name Metromuster. Academic analysis has seen the film as forming a new trial for the people who were convicted, arguing against the narrative presented at the actual trial and presenting evidence for their innocence.

Production began in 2011 with a crowdfunding appeal which raised 4,700 euros to produce a film under Creative Commons license. The directors put in their audiovisual work as unpaid labour and staff at La Directa carried out the investigation. Initially suspicious of filmmakers interested in the 4F case five years after it had happened, the solidarity collective came to trust them. The directorial collective began with four people and ended up being Artigas and Ortega. Over eighteen months, they made twenty interviews and compiled around fifty hours of archive footage. The editing then took another four months. Mayor Jordi Hereu, the city's head of security, representatives of the Guàrdia Urbana and the family of the injured policeman were invited to participate, but they all declined. The directors estimated that had everyone been paid for their work, the film would have cost 90,000 euros. For influences, they cited José Luis Guerín and Joaquim Jordà.

== Release ==
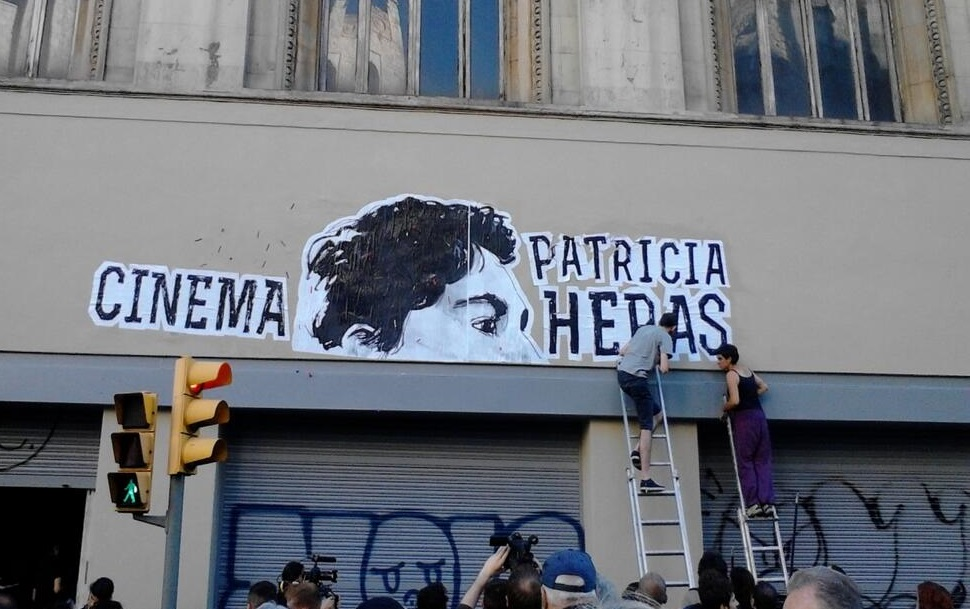
The temporary occupation of Palacio del Cinema de Barcelona in 2013

The first screening of a version of Ciutat Morta took place on June 8, 2013, with an act of civil disobedience. Over a thousand people temporarily occupied the Palacio del Cinema de Barcelona on Via Laietana and renamed it Cinema Patricia Heras. The documentary begins with footage from this event. The Catalan press did not report about the premiere nor about the documentary later winning prizes at film festivals. Director Artigas saw this as "pure and simple censorship". The film screened at the Málaga Spanish Film Festival and was also shown at Doclisboa 2014 and DocsBarcelona.

After the first screening at the occupied cinema, the directors showed the film at over 250 local venues, preferring to get feedback from affected communities and the film was made freely available on the internet. TV3 (Catalan public television) had declined to co-produce the film twice. After months of negotiations and following the intervention of a politician from the Popular Unity Candidacy who accused TV3 of lying about its reasons not to show the film, the documentary was screened on TV3 in January 2015 and the film-makers received 3,000 euros. It received a screen share of 20% and an audience of 569,000 people. During the screening, the union of the Mossos d'Esquadra tweeted that it was "fantasy".

The film was shown on Channel 33 with five minutes of footage removed by order of a Barcelona court, after a case brought by Víctor Gibanel, the ex-head of information at the Guàrdia Urbana. The footage did not pertain to the case itself but showed Gibanel being admonished by a judge for telling falsehoods in another matter. The film implied he had also lied about the events on February 4 and thus had aided the prosecution case improperly. The five minutes were still available online and within 24 hours had been viewed over 200,000 times. Regarding Gibanel's court case, director Xapo Ortega said "he has made a grave mistake".

== Critical response ==
The documentary received favourable reviews. El Mundo called Ciutat Morta "a wonderful work" in 2014. La Crítica lauded the film's passion and importance whilst criticising both its length and its failure to present all sides of the story (although it also conceded that no representative of the police had agreed to participate). EAM Cinema and Cinedivergente both praised the directors, with the latter review commenting that the film exposed the legacy of Francoism in Spain.

Ciutat Morta won the award for Best Documentary at the Málaga Spanish Film Festival in 2014. It won an audience award at a festival in Cádiz and was voted best Spanish documentary at Miradas Doc in Tenerife. The directors received the City Award of Barcelona (Premi Ciutat de Barcelona) in 2014. Juan Pintos released a statement saying he was unsatisfied with the arguments presented by the film in 2015.

== Legacy ==
After the film's release caused controversy about the 4F case, the Catalonian Parliament recommended that the convictions were reviewed. Following the eventual success of the film, a book of poems by Heras was released. The self-published book Ciutat morta: Cronica del caso del 4F (Dead city: Chronicle of the 4F case) collected writings about the 4F case. It was launched in February 2016 at 55 Calle Sant Pere Mès Baix, exactly ten years after the events had occurred. Also in 2016, the hacker Phineas Fisher claimed to have been inspired by the documentary to launch a digital attack on the union of the Mossos d'Esquadra.

The city council of Barcelona under the leadership of Ada Colau introduced several changes to the Guàrdia Urbana, so that all custody areas including police vehicles would have surveillance cameras and arrestees would have the right to see a doctor without the presence of the police. It was not possible to investigate the Guàrdia Urbana further because all documents relating to the case had disappeared. In 2017, El País noted that the release of Ciutat Morta and the resulting controversy had not led to the case being reopened or any of the convictions being overturned. It also commented that the film had shone a spotlight on police violence and recalled that Ada Colau had organised her 2015 campaign to be mayor with a friend of Patricia Heras. The injured policeman has never spoken publicly about the events. He was left in a coma and now is tetraplegic; doctors were surprised that he survived the attack. He received the Police Merit Cross in 2013.

When Lanza was convicted in 2017 after the death of a man in Zaragoza and subsequently had his sentence increased, a political controversy split the Barcelona city council. Cs, PP and PSC all demanded that the City Award of Barcelona given to the directors was cancelled, with Barcelona en Comú and ERC objecting to the proposal. A representative of PP called the film a "lie" and for Cs Ciutat Morta was "not just a farce, but an orchestrated attack".
