= 4F case =

Spanish judicial scandal

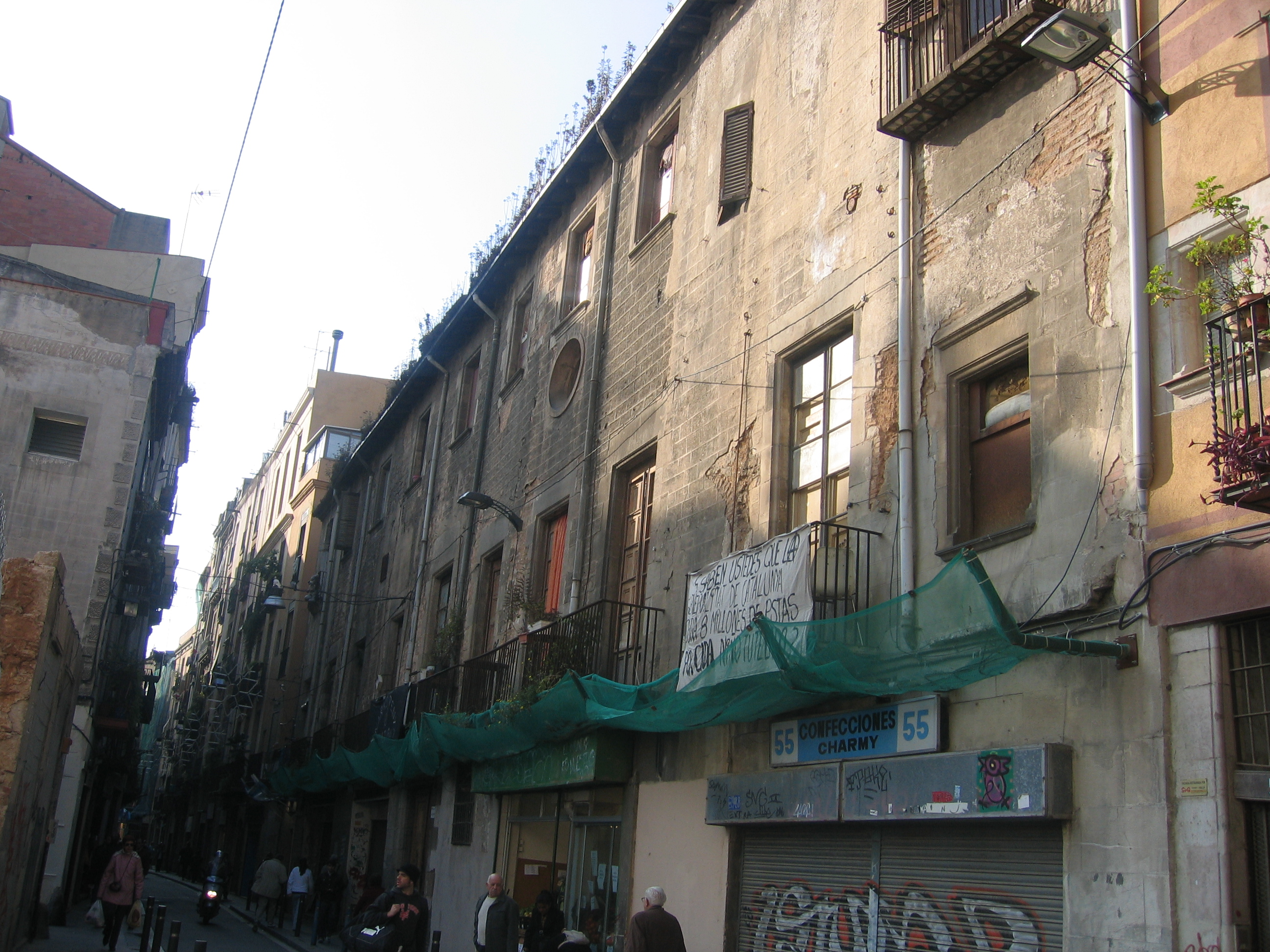
Anarkopenya, the squatted building where the initial events took place, photographed in 2005

The 4F case concerns the events of 4 February 2006 in Barcelona, in which a policeman patrolling outside a rave was paralyzed after being hit by a falling object and nine people were arrested in consequence. At a trial two years later, seven people were convicted, one of whom was then pardoned. On appeal to the Supreme Court, the sentences were lengthened and one person committed suicide.

The 4F case caused controversy and resulted in a film, Ciutat Morta, which argued that those convicted were not responsible for the policeman's injury. The film was viewed over 500,000 times when screened on Catalan television, which then created a further debate both about the case and more general issues such as police violence and gentrification in Barcelona. New mayor Ada Colau pledged to reform the Guàrdia Urbana and an investigation decided not to overturn the convictions.

== 4 February ==
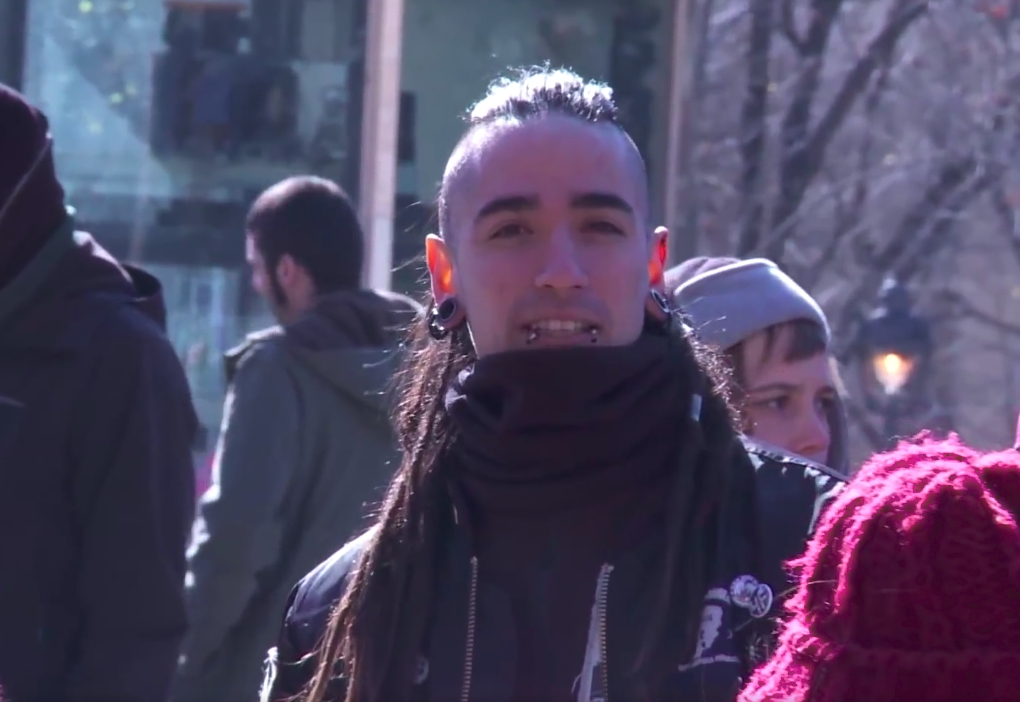
The convicted Rodrigo Lanza in 2012

On the night of Saturday, 4 February (4F) 2006, a rave was happening at the Anarkopenya squat at 55 Calle Sant Pere Mès Baix in the Ciutat Vella district of Barcelona. It had been occupied since 2002. When the Guàrdia Urbana (municipal police) patrolled the area, objects including flowerpots were thrown from the roof. One policeman was hit on the head and fell unconscious. He became tetraplegic and has never spoken publicly about the events.

The police began to arrest people on the street including three men of Latin American ancestry with European passports, namely Alex Cisternas, Rodrigo Lanza and Juan Pintos. In total, there were nine arrests. According to the later testimony of Lanza and Pintos, the three men were beaten and tortured at the police station; their injuries were so bad that they were taken to Hospital del Mar. At the hospital, the police officers encountered Patricia Heras and Alfredo Pestenas, who had gone there after a bicycle crash elsewhere in the city; they checked their phones and decided to arrest them also.

== Trial ==
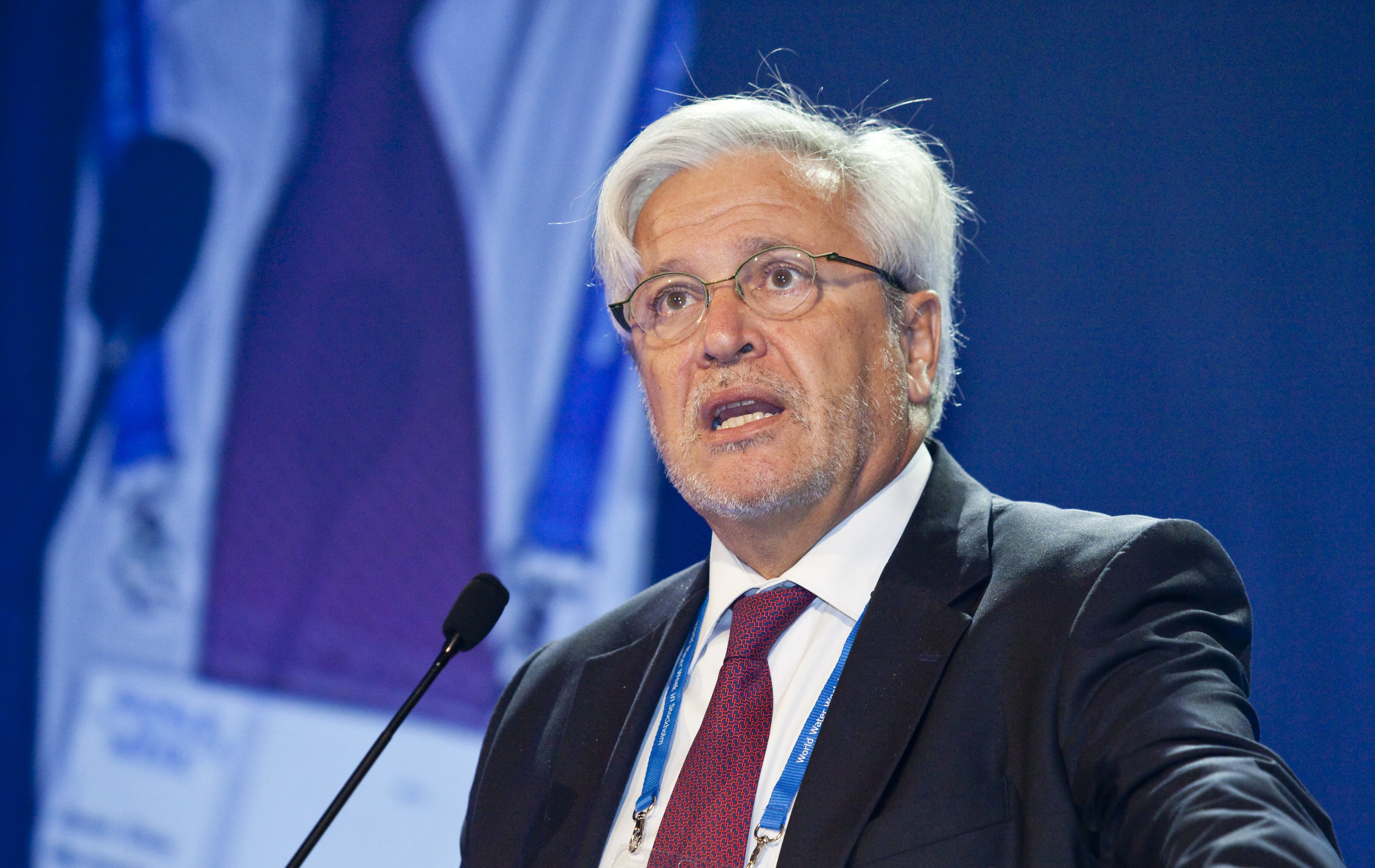
Joan Clos, former mayor, pictured as director of the United Nations Human Settlements Programme in 2011

At trial in 2008, seven people were convicted of their charges and were sentenced to between three and five years in prison. Mayor Joan Clos had said on 5 February 2006 that the policeman had been injured by a flowerpot thrown from the roof of the squat. If he had given evidence to that effect, the prosecution case would have fallen apart, but he changed his story to say that the policeman was hit by a stone. A forensic report which confirmed that the policeman had been hit by an object falling from above was submitted to trial but ignored by the judge.

The group of three men had already served two years and therefore could be released, then on appeal to the Supreme Court of Spain their sentences were increased so they went back to jail. Cisternas was sent to Cárcel Modelo in Madrid. Despite the two having been charged and convicted together, Alfredo Pestenas was pardoned and Patricia Heras was not. She received a three-year sentence and whilst on release in April 2011, she killed herself by jumping off a balcony.

== Ciutat Morta ==
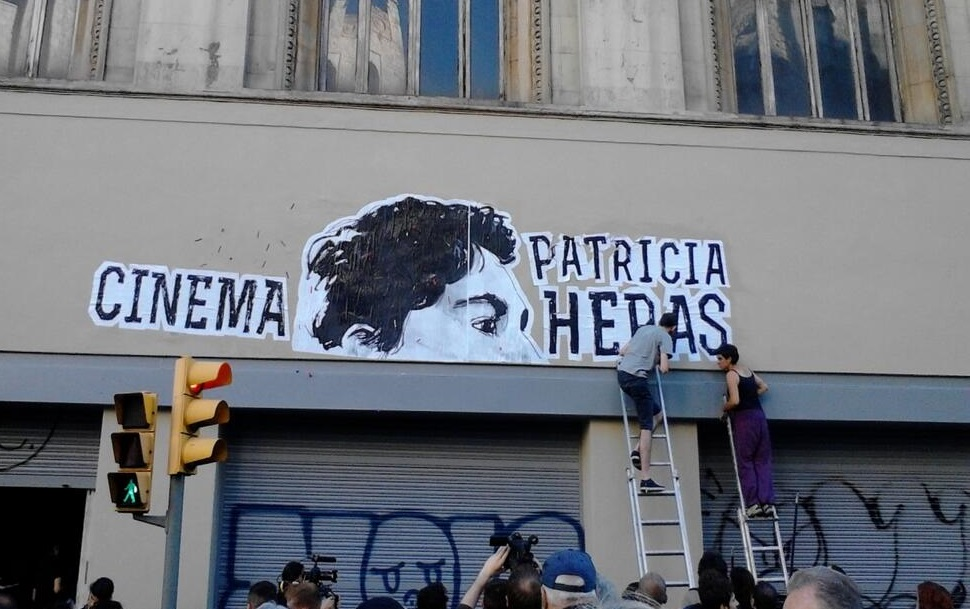
Activists paste up the new name of Cinema Patricia Heras on a squatted cinema in 2013

Soon after Heras had killed herself in 2011, Xavier Artigas and Xapo Ortega met at the beginning of the 15M movement at Plaça de Catalunya and decided to make a short film commemorating her life. This project then became the film Ciutat Morta. It challenged the official narrative about the events of 4 February and suggested the people convicted were not guilty of any offences, but rather guilty of being "incívicos", namely people who were considered "uncivil" since they were assumed to be skateboarders, street drinkers, sex workers or squatters. The film accuses the police, the justice system and the doctors of permitting torture. It premiered at a squatted cinema and when it was eventually shown on Catalan television in 2015, it received over 500,000 views.

After the directors mentioned the testimony of an anonymous witness who knew who the person who had thrown the projectile and could testify that it was not any of the people convicted, calls were made to re-open the case. A representative of the Colegio de Abogados de Barcelona (Barcelona Bar Association) said there were now enough reasons to do so. Mayor Xavier Trias affirmed his faith in the actions of the police and Jordi Hereu who at the time had been responsible for security said he had taken the right actions, but if there was new evidence it should be looked at. The city council asked the public prosecutor to watch the film to see if the case should be reopened, a motion supported by Cs, ERC, ICV and Guanyem Barcelona. The Catalan Parliament then recommended that the convictions were reviewed. A demonstration was held on 4 February 2015 in which thousands of people marched through Barcelona to mourn the death of Heras and to denounce the 4F convictions.

== Later convictions ==
Two of the police officers alleged to have beaten up the three Latin American men were Bakari Samyang and Victor Bayona. In October 2014, they were themselves convicted and imprisoned for assaulting and torturing a student from Trinidad and Tobago who was the son of a diplomat. In 2006, the two off-duty police officers had been challenged by the student because they were harassing a woman in a bar. They took him to a police station and tortured him, resulting in an official complaint. The two officers were imprisoned for two years and three months.

Rodrigo Lanza was imprisoned for five years after a 2017 barfight in Zaragoza with a man who had been a member of the far-right party Falange Española de las JONS since the 1980s. The man was struck and fell over, later dying of his injuries. In 2020, Lanza's sentence was increased to 20 years and two years later it was reduced to 18.5.

== Legacy ==
The 4F case and Ciutat Morta generated a lengthy public debate, which broadened from the voicing of concerns regarding the innocence of those convicted into a discussion about the moral state of the city of Barcelona. As part of the gentrification of Barcelona, Mayor Joan Clos had introduced the Plan for the Promotion of Civic Virtues which penalised behaviours such as begging, skateboarding, public urination and prostitution. Framing these actions as a matter of public hygiene, almost 150 fines were issued every day. The 4F case challenged this discourse and an investigation by journalists from La Directa which accompanied the film Ciutat Morta noted that it was curious that a building owned by the city council of Barcelona, which was in a residential area and had been occupied purely for raves without a connection to the political squatting movement, had been tolerated for several years without being evicted. The journalists suggested it had been deliberately left alone in order to make the neighbours move away as part of a gentrification process.

On the issue of police violence, a professor of social anthropology asserted there had been no change in police tactics since the end of the Franco dictatorship. Amnesty International released a report in 2007 which condemned both the impunity of police officers from prosecution and the bias of judges. Under a new administration led by Ada Colau, the city council of Barcelona pledged to make a new behavioural code for the Guàrdia Urbana which would encompass video surveillance in all custody areas and the right for arrestees to see a doctor unaccompanied by an officer. An investigation into police wrongdoing was stymied by the disappearance of all documents related to the case and as of 2017, no convictions had been overturned.

The policeman struck by the projectile was awarded the Police Merit Cross in 2013. The book Ciutat Morta: Cronica del Caso del 4F (Dead City: Chronicle of the 4F Case) was released exactly ten years after the original incident. The 4F case returned to the attention of local media in 2020, when the city council refused to withdraw its prize of the City Award of Barcelona for the directors of the film, following the increase in the sentence for Rodrigo Lanza's Zaragoza conviction.

== See also ==
- Anarchism in Spain
- Scala case
- Squatting in Spain

== Bibliography ==
- Debelle, Galvão; Cattaneo, Claudio; González, Robert; Barranco, Oriol; Llobet, Marta (2018). "Squatting Cycles in Barcelona: Identities, Repression and the Controversy of Institutionalisation". The Urban Politics of Squatters' Movements. pp. 51–73. doi:10.1057/978-1-349-95314-1_3. ISBN 978-1-349-95313-4.
- Delclós, Carlos (7 February 2015). "Dead City: Torturing Squatters for a Cleaner Barcelona". ROAR Magazine. Archived from the original on 17 November 2020.
- Luesma, Berta Jimenez (5 February 2016). "El recuerdo como lucha: 'Ciutat Morta, Crónica del Caso 4F'". Diario Libre d'Aragón (in Spanish). AraInfo. Archived from the original on 22 December 2017.
- Rius, Josep Carles (17 May 2016). Periodismo en Reconstrucción (in Spanish). Edicions Universitat Barcelona. ISBN 978-84-475-3986-4. Archived from the original on 1 December 2020.
- Woods Peiró, Eva (1 June 2018). "Subveillant Narration, Digital Tools and Videoactivism: Ciutat Morta (2013)". Screen. 59 (2): 249–257. doi:10.1093/screen/hjy027. ISSN 0036-9543.
