= Public Safety Institute of Catalonia =

First responders academy of Catalonia, Spain

- Institut de Seguretat Pública de Catalunya
- Former name: Police School of Catalonia (1985-2007)
- Established: 2007
- Director: Marta Roca Fina
- Location: Mollet del Vallés, Catalonia, Spain
- Affiliated institutions: Mossos d'Esquadra; Corps of Firefighters of Catalonia; Rural Agents Corps; Civil Protection Corps; University of Barcelona
- Website: ispc.gencat.cat

The Public Safety Institute of Catalonia (in Catalan and officially: Institut de Seguretat Pública de Catalunya, 'ISPC') is an educational institution for first responders from Spain's autonomous community of Catalonia.

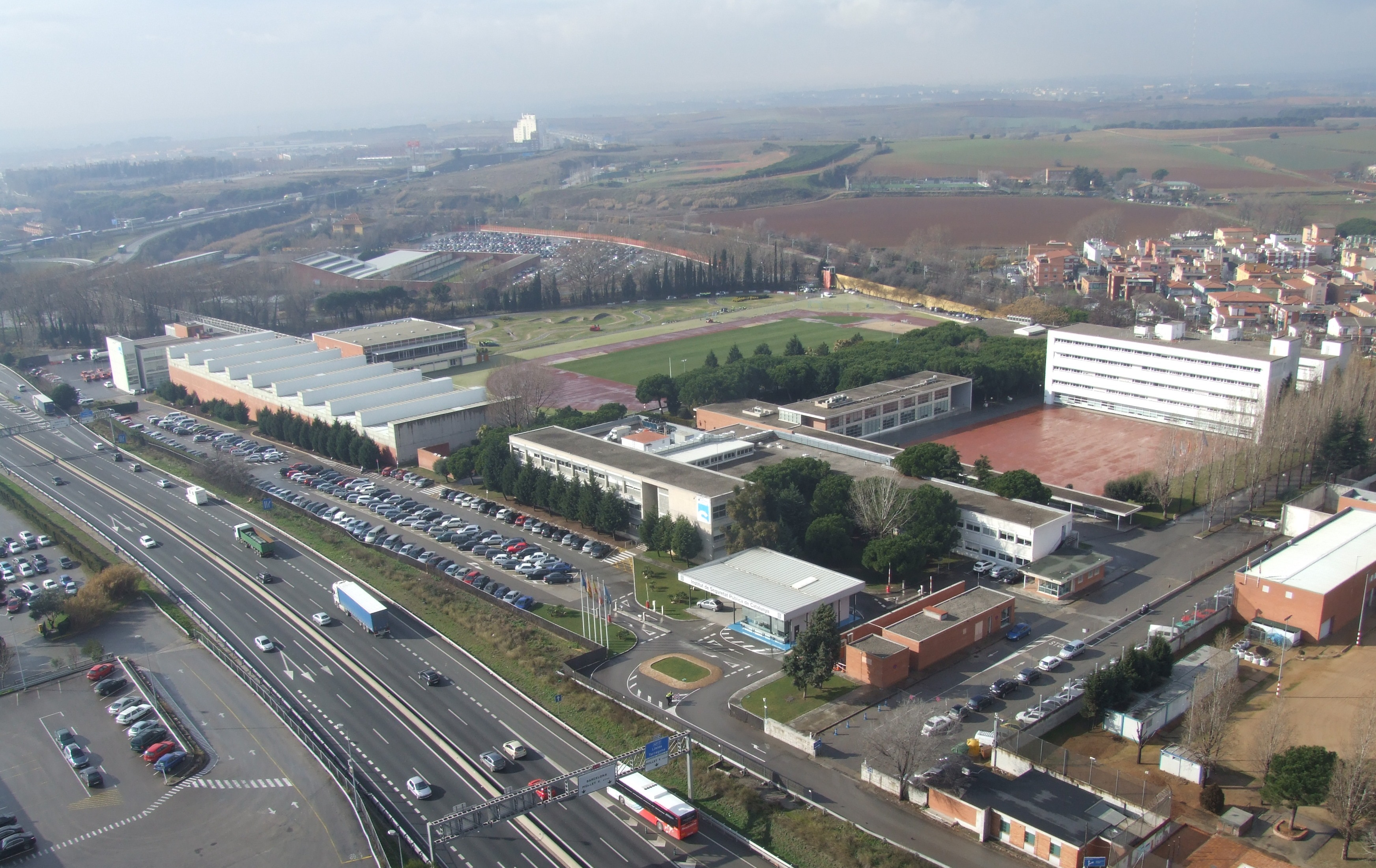
Aerial view of the ISPC.

The ISPC is under the direction of the Catalan Government, and it is also an attached center to the University of Barcelona.

== Schools ==
The institute is divided into 3 schools:

=== Police School of Catalonia ===
In Catalan; Escola de Policia de Catalunya, the police academy that trains the Mossos d'Esquadra and local police forces of Catalonia.

Offers the basic training course for cadets (Curs de Formació Bàsica per a Policies), promotion courses, continued training courses, specialized units courses and other training programs.

The Police School is currently under the direction of Mossos' Commissioner Cristina Manresa.

=== Fire Service, Civil Protection and Rural Agents School ===
In Catalan; Escola de Bombers, Protecció Civil i Agents Rurals de Catalunya, is in charge of offering basic, promotion, specialization and habilitation courses for the Corps of Firefighters of Catalonia, Firefighters of Barcelona, civil protection members, Corps of Rural Agents of Catalonia and Forest Defense Groups.

=== University Centre ===
Since 2015, the ISPC imparts the bachelor's degree in security from the University of Barcelona.
