= Ortésia Cabrera Fuster =

Catalan politician and artist (born 1989)

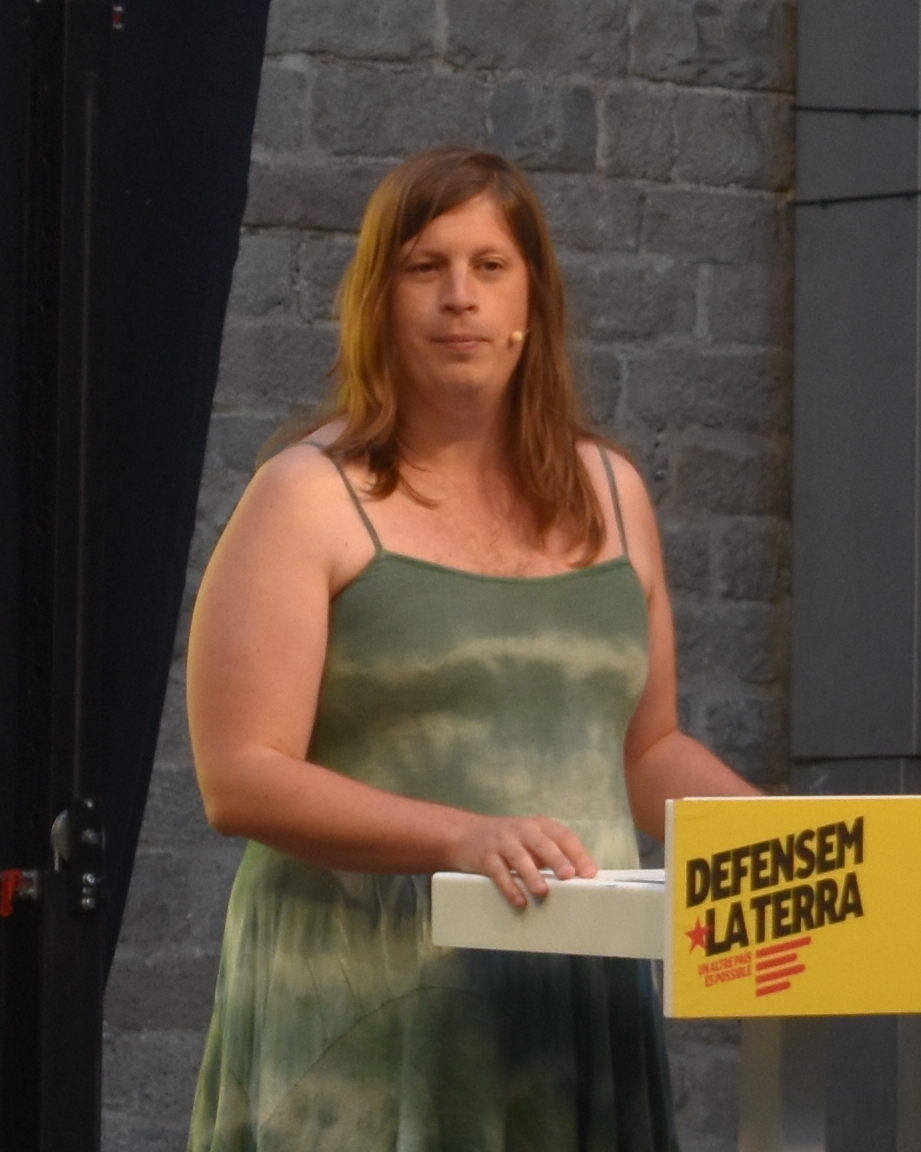
- Cabrera in 2024
- Born: 1989 (age 36–37); Amposta, Spain
- Education: University of Deusto
- Occupations: Artist; musician; writer; translator; LGBTQ activist

Ortésia Cabrera Fuster (born 1989), known by the stage name ivaquexuta, is a multidisciplinary artist and politician from Catalonia, who has worked as a writer and art curator. She has also worked as a narrator, playwright, musician and translator.

== Career ==
=== As an artist ===
She is part of the Assembly Platform of Artists of Catalonia. Her artistic works focus on the youth situation in the Terres de l'Ebre, the job insecurity of Millennials or the situation of neurodivergent people in Catalonia. She also works with postcolonialism, the third sector, contemporary art, and philosophy.

In 2017, she directed the ExtincióFest event at the Lo Pati Art Center. In 2018, she was selected in the Art Jove de Patrimonio call of the National Art Museum of Catalonia, which the following year hosted her exhibition "Una gestió diferent del dolor" ("A different management of pain"). In 2021, she received a production grant from the Hangar center, with which she made the podcast intimidad forzada ("forced intimacy") in collaboration with the Asperger Association of Catalonia. She also won the Miquel Casablancas Prize Visual Arts Contest, organized by Sant Andreu Contemporani, in the mediation category. In 2023, she participated in the performance "Los escribientes" ("The scribes"), organized by Utopia Ramblas in La Rambla, together with artists Cecilia Vieira, Enrique Baeza, Marla Jacarilla and Jordi Vizcaíno. In addition, she has exhibited her work at the Barcelona Museum of Contemporary Art, the Sala de Arte Joven, the Mèdol – Centre d’Arts Contemporànies de Tarragona and the Pere Anguera Library.

=== As a politician ===
In politics, she is in favor of Catalan independence, the LGBTQ+ rights movement and feminist struggle. She opposes Neoliberalism, patriarchy, the Spanish monarchy, the Spanish State, Racism, Sexism, Classism, marginalization and Colonialism.

She has been a member of various spaces of the Catalan Independentist left, such as Maulets, [óvens de les Terres de l'Ebre and the Sindicat d'Estudiants dels Països Catalans, and has also worked in the media La Directa and L'Escuranda. In addition, she is linked to the associative fabric of Amposta, has organized alternative festivals in the municipality and is locally involved in popular culture and the feminist movement.

In 2024, having belonged to the Support Group of the CUP of the Terres de l'Ebre, she ran in the elections to the Parliament of Catalonia as the third candidate of the party to the constituency of Tarragona, behind Sergi Saladié and Eloi Redon. As a result, the CUP received a barrage of criticism, accused of not respecting gender equality on the list due to the inclusion of Cabrera, despite the fact that she legally appeared in the Spanish Civil Registry as a woman. Faced with the controversy, supporters of the formation labeled the criticisms as "machismo" and "transphobia".

== Personal life ==
Cabrera identifies as a trans woman or trans non-binary. She came out in 2022. She also labels herself as rural, Catalan, from a working class background, neurodivergent and disabled. She is a survivor of child sexual abuse.
