= Bombers de Barcelona =

Operational area
- Country: Spain
- City: Barcelona
- Address: Plaça de Carles Buïgas, 8, 08038 Barcelona

Agency overview
- Established: 1825
- Employees: 623

Facilities and equipment
- Stations: 7

The Bombers de Barcelona (English: Firefighters of Barcelona) is the fire and rescue service for the city of Barcelona, Catalonia, Spain. The service was founded in 1825 as the La Companyia de Bombers (Company of Firemen), consisting of 25 men. The Barcelona City Council took control of the fire service in 1839.

The service consists of seven stations and 425 firefighters and officers.

== See also ==
- Guàrdia Urbana de Barcelona
- Corps of Firefighters of Catalonia
