= Sherwood syndrome =

Public security concept by David Piqué

Sherwood syndrome is a police tactical metaphor invented by David Piqué during his tenure as General Commissioner of Territorial Coordination for the Mossos d'Esquadra, the police force of Catalonia. It is not clear what he intended to convey by the term, but it has been wrongly interpreted in Spain as supportive of repressive police tactics. Piqué died in 2016.

The name Sherwood syndrome was given by Piqué. It refers to the legend of Robin Hood in which Robin Hood himself decides who deserves to be targeted and robbed and who does not as they pass through Sherwood Forest.

== Thesis ==
Piqué's thesis analyzes the squatters' movement in Barcelona during the 1990s and 2000s, more specifically the squatters' movement in the Gràcia neighborhood. It establishes public safety strategies that could be implemented to address this issue, and derives its ideas in particular from the strategies of wartime conflict and classical military theory literature.

The thesis criticizes actions to incite protesters. It discourages carrying out arbitrary detentions before an actual protest takes place, cause that would increase the emotional intensity of the protest and would transition it to what the thesis calls "a pitched battle". Then, during the protest itself, police should avoid the "Miyamoto Musashi model", in which police would use excessive force and provocation towards demonstrators with the intention of turning them violent. To that point, the text disapproves that some police forces remain inactive until "the damage done to public property becomes socially unacceptable". The police should charge rapidly and directly against protestors so they do not have the chance to create havoc. The text advocates for interventions that minimize "innocent victims", avoids violently scattering of the protesters and to carry out only necessary arrests.

Finally, if protesters cannot be deterred from using violence, the thesis suggests harnessing this to generate negative public opinion toward the protesting group. In the case of squatters in Gràcia, Piqué specifically advocated for following this up with legislation that both criminalizes illegal squatting but promoting at the same time cheap social housing. Meanwhile, the police would arrest those whom Piqué described as "unbeatable" or "leaders" who would later on be prosecuted according to law.

== Reaction ==
When the text was first made public, it raised some concerns because it was misinterpreted to prescribe legally questionable police practices supposedly to be carried out by the Catalan police.
