= Mossos d'Esquadra =

Police force of Catalonia, Spain

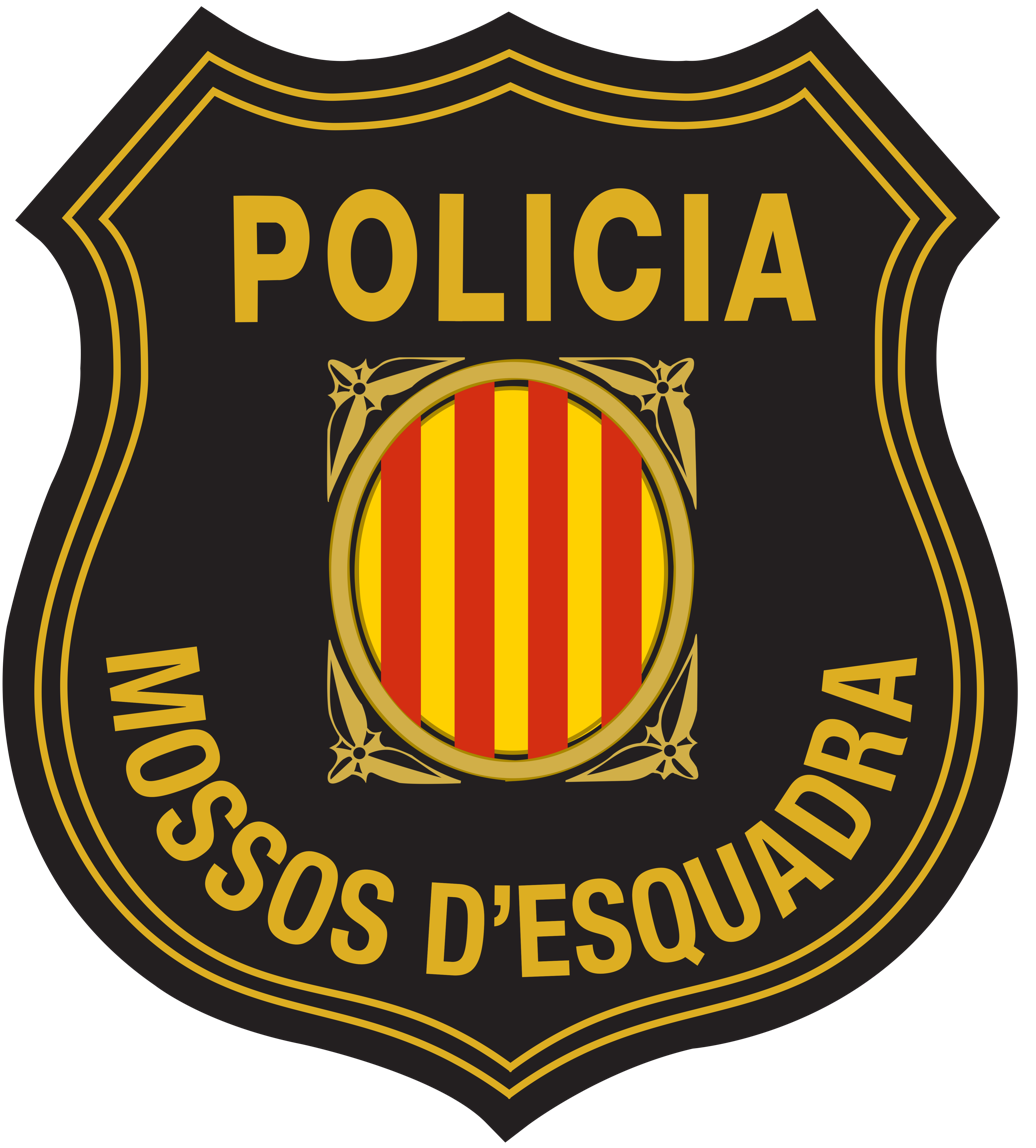
- Badge

- Logo
- Common name: Mossos

Agency overview
- Formed: 21 April 1719; 307 years ago
- Legal personality: Police force

Jurisdictional structure
- Operations jurisdiction: Catalonia, Spain
- Governing body: Generalitat de Catalunya
- General nature: Civilian police

Operational structure
- Headquarters: Central Complex 'Egara', Sabadell (Barcelona)
- Officers: 19.029
- Interior minister responsible: Núria Parlón Gil
- Agency executives: Ferran López Navarro, Police Director; Sílvia Catà Culubret, Head Commissioner

Facilities
- Stations: 109

Notables
- Award: Medal of Honour of the Parliament of Catalonia (2017)

Website
- mossos.gencat.cat

The Mossos d'Esquadra (Catalan pronunciation: [ˈmosuz ðəsˈkwaðɾə]; lit. 'Squad Lads', legally known as the Police of the Generalitat–Mossos d'Esquadra; Catalan: Policia de la Generalitat–Mossos d'Esquadra; and informally simply as Mossos) is the autonomous police force of Catalonia.

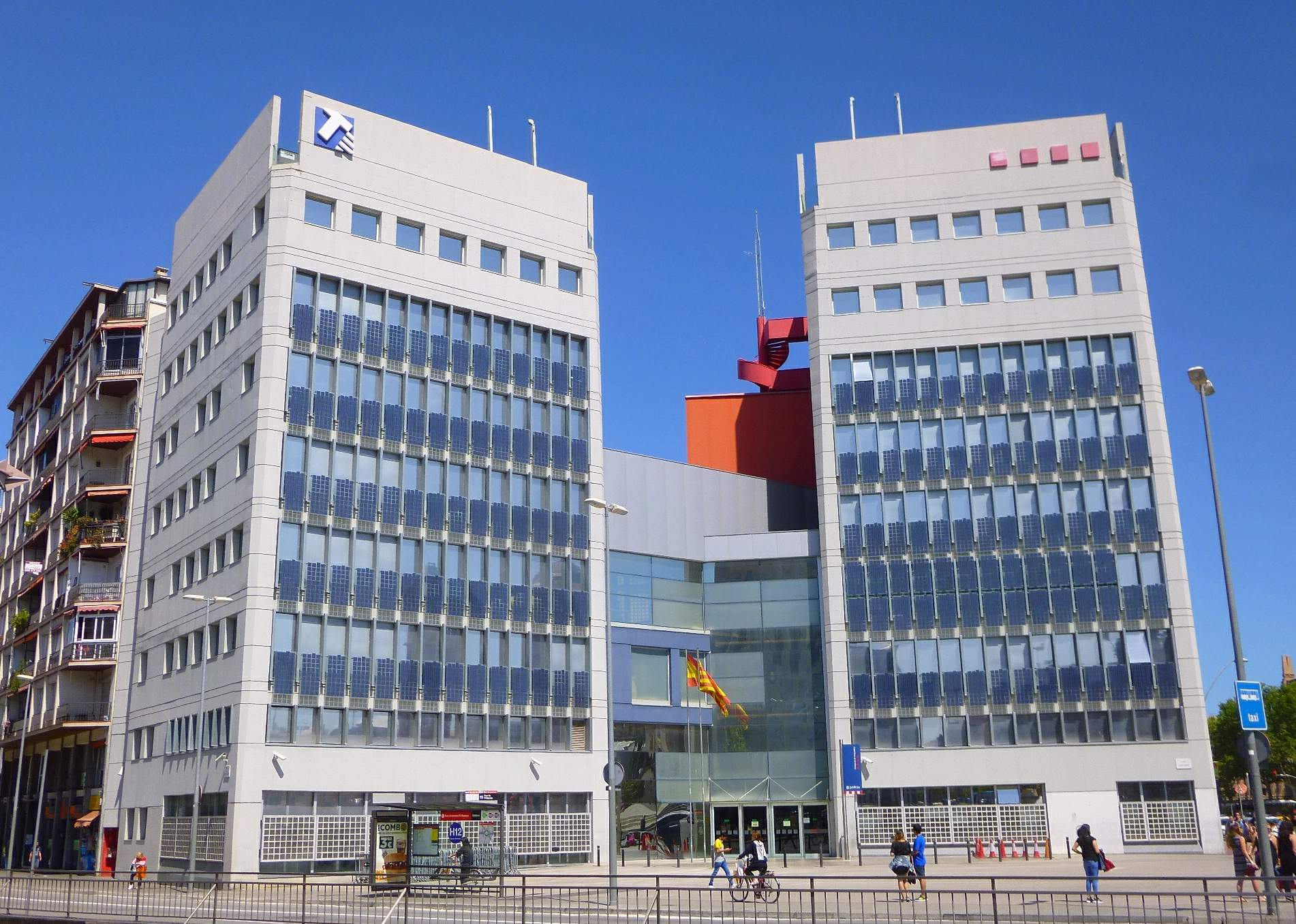
Mossos' Eixample (Barcelona) police station.

It is currently the main law enforcement agency and security force in Catalonia, with about 19,000 officers. Since 2008, the Mossos have largely replaced the duties of the National Police Corps and Civil Guard. The force operates under the authority of the Ministry of Home Affairs and Public Safety of the Government of Catalonia.

== History ==
=== Previous Catalan forces ===
The Esquadras de Paisans Armats, later known as the Esquadres de Catalunya, (and informally known as the Mossos d'Esquadra), were men-at-arms who had fought as irregulars in the War of the Spanish Succession, and were brought together by the mayor of the town of Valls near Tarragona between 1719 and 1721. The corps was constituted as a militia to provide security to trade routes and fairs. It was created as a complement to the regular troops of the Bourbon army, which opposed the Miquelets, who survived as rebel supporters of Archduke Charles.

The Mossos was manned by local people, who had to speak Catalan and be familiar with local paths, caves, and hiding places. It was eventually placed under military jurisdiction, but was less centralised than the Spanish police force (then known as the Intendencia General de Policía) formed in 1817, or the yet-to-be-established Guardia Civil. Throughout the centuries, control of the Mossos passed back and forth several times from Catalan authority to Spanish military command.

The Mossos were dissolved in 1868 by General Prim after the fall of Queen Isabella II of Spain, since the Mossos had always been royalists. They were reinstated in 1876 under the reign of Isabella's son king Alfonso XII of Spain, but only in the province of Barcelona. Under his son Alfonso XIII of Spain, the Mossos were not well regarded in Catalonia, especially by the Commonwealth of Catalonia, who paid them but had no control over them.

The Mossos flourished under Primo de Rivera's dictatorship; despite this, when the Second Spanish Republic was proclaimed, the Mossos sided with the Generalitat de Catalunya (the government of Catalonia). After the Spanish Civil War, the last Mossos left Catalonia with the President of the Generalitat, and the corps was dissolved by the Francoist authorities.

On 21 July 1950 the Francoist-controlled Provincial Deputation of Barcelona was authorised to create a small security force using part of the historical title, "Secció de Mossos d'Esquadra". This new force was a small militarized corps with limited powers, in charge of protecting the government buildings of the Province of Barcelona.

=== Recent history ===
With the return of democracy to Spain, in 1980, the force started to grow in numbers and transferred under the authority of the Generalitat de Catalunya. It was also assigned the duties of protection of its official buildings and authorities.

In 1983, the Mossos officially became a police force. Under Law 19/1983 of the Parliament of Catalonia and the Statute of Autonomy of Catalonia, the Mossos became the autonomous police force of Catalonia. With duties on public safety, public order and protection of official buildings and authorities, the force regained the historical title of Mossos d'Esquadra.

In 1985, the first women were allowed to join the force.

In 1994, the Catalan and Spanish governments agreed in Catalonia's Security Board that the Mossos must become the integral main police force of Catalonia and replace the National Police and Civil Guard. The force began its deployment in Vic, and the planning for its full deployment through the rest of the territory began. Later in 1998, the force assumed intercity traffic enforcement from the Civil Guard.

In 2005 the force deployed and assumed the duties of the Spanish national forces in the city of Barcelona, and in 2008 it completed the deployment through all Catalonia. The force has gained more officers and duties since then, and it currently enforces most of the policing-related duties (except documentation expedition, immigration enforcement, ports and airports protection, customs inspection and maritime policing, which is still handled by the national police forces).

The Mossos undertook one of its most significant operations in 2017, named "Chronos", to respond to the 2017 Barcelona attacks that killed 16 people and injured 155 others. The operation ended with all suspects neutralized or in custody and the Mossos were awarded the Medal of Honour of the Parliament of Catalonia. The Head Commissioner at the time, Josep Lluís Trapero was promoted to the force's highest and honorary rank, Major, only ever held by Joan Unió (who led the deployment of the force).

In 2025, the Spanish government announced it would transfer immigration enforcement and protection of ports and airports duties to the autonomous force, but the proposal faced criticism in the Congress of Deputies and is yet to be approved.

== Duties and current role ==
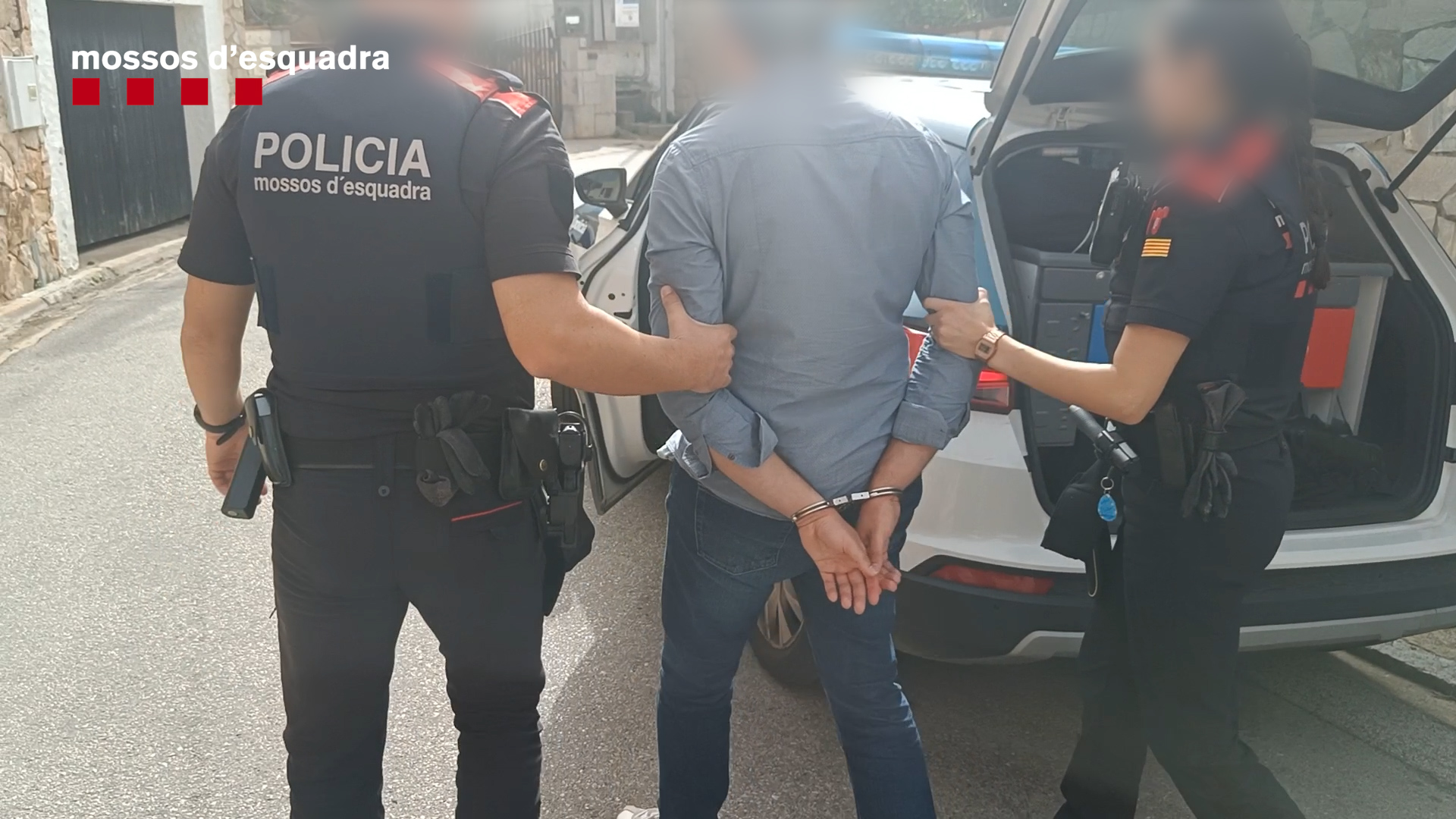
Mossos detaining a man in Lloret de Mar.

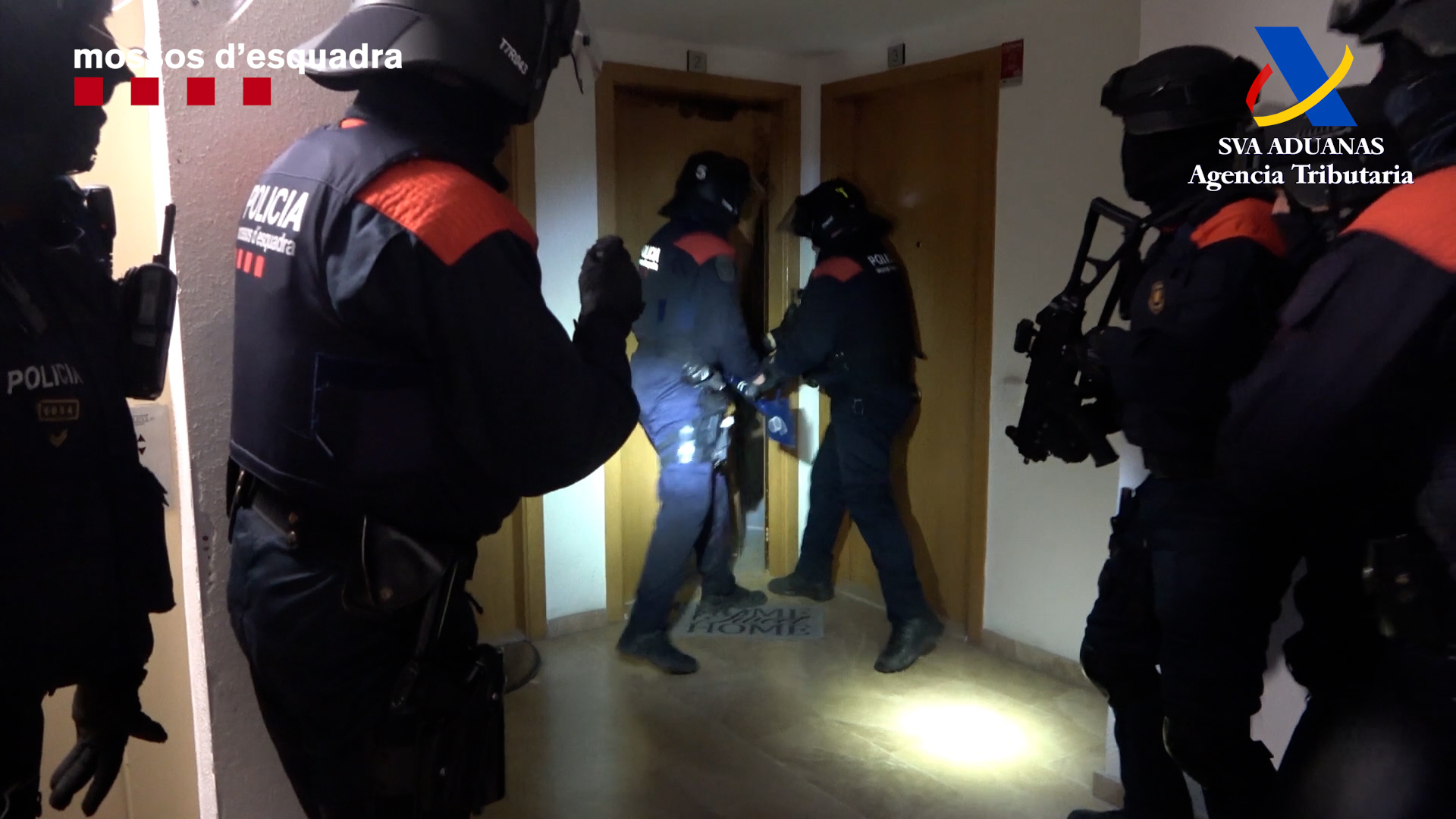
Mossos about to breach and dismantle a major drug trafficking organisation, cooperating with the Customs Service.

Since 2008, the Mossos d'Esquadra are the main law enforcement agency within the territory of Catalonia and exercise most of the policing duties. Their duties, as defined by Law 10/1994, are:

- Upholding the Constitution and the Statute of Autonomy.
- Exercising public safety policing duties (preventing crime and responding to emergencies).
- Maintaining public order and protecting demonstrations.
- Protecting and monitoring the authorities and facilities of the Generalitat.
- Ensuring compliance with Catalan administrative laws.
- Exercising criminal investigation duties ("judicial policing") at their own initiative and under request of judicial authorities or the Prosecution Ministry.
- Cooperating with local police forces, providing operational support and exercising their duties in municipalities that do not have a police force.
- Any other duties transferred or delegated to the Catalan government.

The force operates under the authority of the Generalitat de Catalunya, through the Catalan Department of the Interior and Public Safety.

Even though the Mossos is defined as the integral and ordinary police of Catalonia, duties regarding documentation expedition and immigration enforcement are still conducted by the National Police; and maritime policing, customs control and airport protection are still enforced by the Civil Guard.

In an attempt to gain those remaining competencies, a maritime unit to support and enforce maritime policing duties was created recently, and a parliamentary dispute is ongoing on whether autonomous forces should assume immigration enforcement, customs policing and airport protection.

The Mossos are trained at the Public Safety Institute of Catalonia, which also trains local police officers, firefighters and rural agents.

== Ranks ==
The Mossos d'Esquadra has several ranks that differentiates duties and responsibilities. The ranks, until 2026, were:

Ranks of the Mossos d'Esquadra
Insignia								No insignia
Title	Major	Comissari	Intendent	Inspector	Sotsinspector	Sergent	Caporal	Mosso
English translation	Major	Commissioner	Intendent	Inspector	Lieutenant	Sergeant	Corporal	Constable

The rank of Major is not an operative rank, but rather an honorary one used to recognize officers who have made significant contributions to the force. As of now, only 2 officers have reached this rank: Major Joan Unió (who led the deployment of the force in between the 1990s and 2000s) and Major Josep Lluís Trapero (who led the response and investigation to the 2017 Barcelona attacks).

The force is directed by two figures: the Police Director ("Director General de la Policia", a civilian position), and the operative chief of police, who can be either a Major or a Head Commissioner (the chief police does not necessarily have to be an active Major). Both positions are chosen by the Catalan Government's Executive Council.

== Vehicles ==
The Mossos d'Esquadra use all kinds of vehicles. SUVs for most patrol units, vans for intervention units, automobiles for public relations or supervisors, helicopters, drones and vessels.

=== SUVs, crossovers and all-terrains ===
Vehicle	Image	Origin	Notes
SEAT Ateca		Spain	
SEAT Arona		Spain	
SEAT Tarraco		Spain	Mainly used for traffic enforcement.
Ford Kuga		United States	
Ford Ranger		United States	
Toyota Land Cruiser		Japan	

=== Motorbikes ===
Vehicle	Image	Origin	Notes
BMW R1250RT		Germany	Used for traffic enforcement.
BMW F850GS		Germany	Used by the Regional Motorbike Group of Barcelona.
Zero DS		United States	Used by the Regional Motorbike Group of Barcelona.

=== Automobiles ===
Vehicle	Image	Origin	Notes
Cupra Born		Spain	
Nissan Leaf		Japan	
SEAT Altea		Spain	Most have been retired and replaced by newer SUVs.

=== Vans ===
Vehicle	Image	Origin	Notes
Mercedes-Benz Sprinter		Germany	
Mercedes-Benz Vito		Germany	Mainly used for traffic enforcement.
Volkswagen Crafter		Germany	
Ford Transit		United States	
Peugeot Traveller		France	Mainly used for detainee transport.

=== Helicopters ===
Vehicle	Image	Origin	Notes
Eurocopter AS355 Écureuil 2		France	
Airbus Helicopters H135-P2		Europe	
Airbus Helicopters H135-T3		Europe	

=== Vessels ===
Vehicle	Image	Origin	Notes
Quer Explorer 40		Spain	Named 'Cap de Creus', 'Josefina Castellví' and 'Narcís Monturiol'.
Rigid Inflatable Boat		Spain	

== Special intervention group (GEI) ==
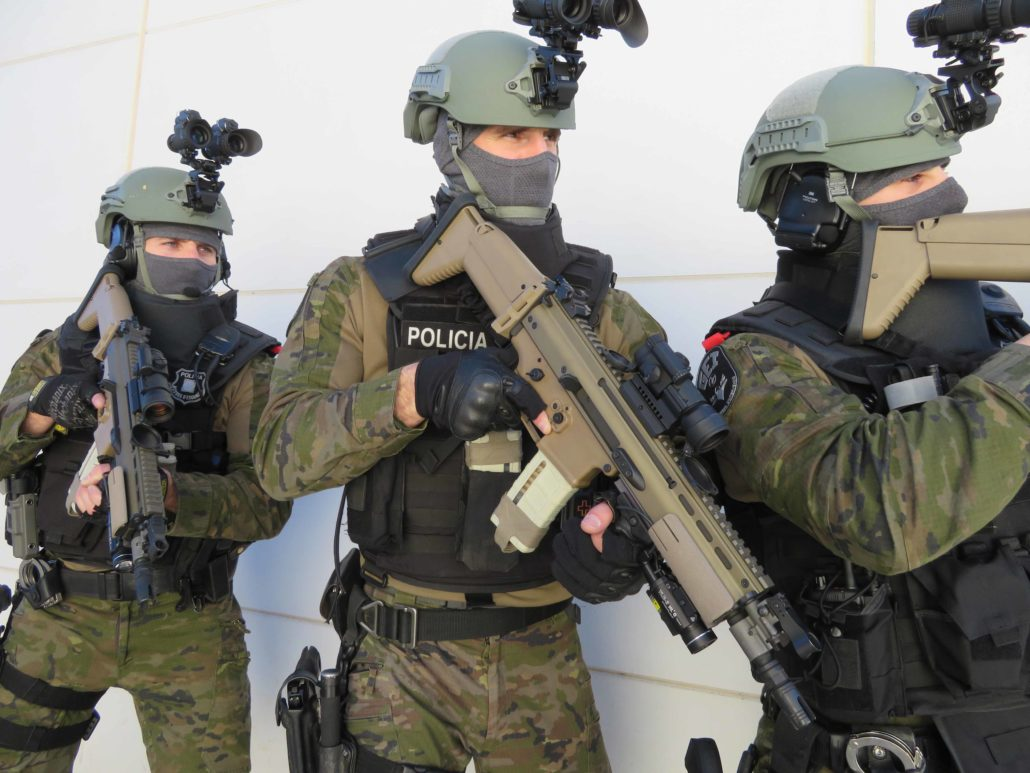
Special intervention group of Mossos d'Esquadra

The Special Intervention Group (GEI; in Catalan: Grup Especial d'Intervenció) is a Mossos d'Esquadra body that specializes in situations with a high risk of armed violence such as terrorist detention, rescues of hostages, and VIP protection. This group is under the command of the Intervention Division.

This group was created in 1984 with the collaboration of Spezialeinsatzkommando (SEK) of Germany. It was kept secret in anticipation of the security challenges that would be posed with the holding of the Barcelona Olympic Games in 1992. Another rationale for its creation was to transfer responsibility for prisons to the Generalitat de Catalonia; this was felt to require a protocol to deal with riots or hostage-taking.

== Firearms ==
The force has a large quantity and variety of weapons.

Weapon	Origin	Type
Heckler & Koch P30	Germany	Sidearm
Heckler & Koch USP Compact	Germany	Sidearm
Glock 17 Gen 5	Austria	Sidearm
Walther P99	Germany	Sidearm
FN Five-seveN	Belgium	Sidearm
Heckler & Koch MP5	Germany	Submachine gun
Heckler & Koch MP7	Germany	Submachine gun
FN P90	Belgium	Submachine gun
Heckler & Koch G36	Germany	Assault rifle
FN SCAR	Belgium	Assault rifle
Heckler & Koch HK417	Germany	Precision rifle
Remington 870	USA	Shotgun
Heckler & Koch PSG1	Germany	Sniper rifle
SAKO TRG-22	Finland	Sniper rifle
M110 Semi-Automatic Sniper System	USA	Sniper rifle
AMP DSR-1	Germany	Sniper rifle

== Controversies and legal cases ==
Controversies related to the Mossos d'Esquadra include:

- In 2008, three Mossos were sentenced to six years of imprisonment for the torture and injury of an alleged delinquent who was later proven not guilty. In 2009, the Tribunal Supremo reduced the sentence. In 2012, the offending Mossos were paroled.
- In 2016, six agents were found guilty of the murder and torture of Juan Andrés Benítez in the neighborhood of Raval on October 6, 2013. Two more Mossos were found guilty of obstructing justice for destroying evidence related to the crime. None of the eight criminals actually served a sentence.
- In 2017, the central government suspended the Chief of Police Major Trapero during the 2017–18 Spanish constitutional crisis, and also placed the force under investigation. The Mossos were eventually cleared of any wrongdoing and Trapero was reinstated.

== Gallery ==
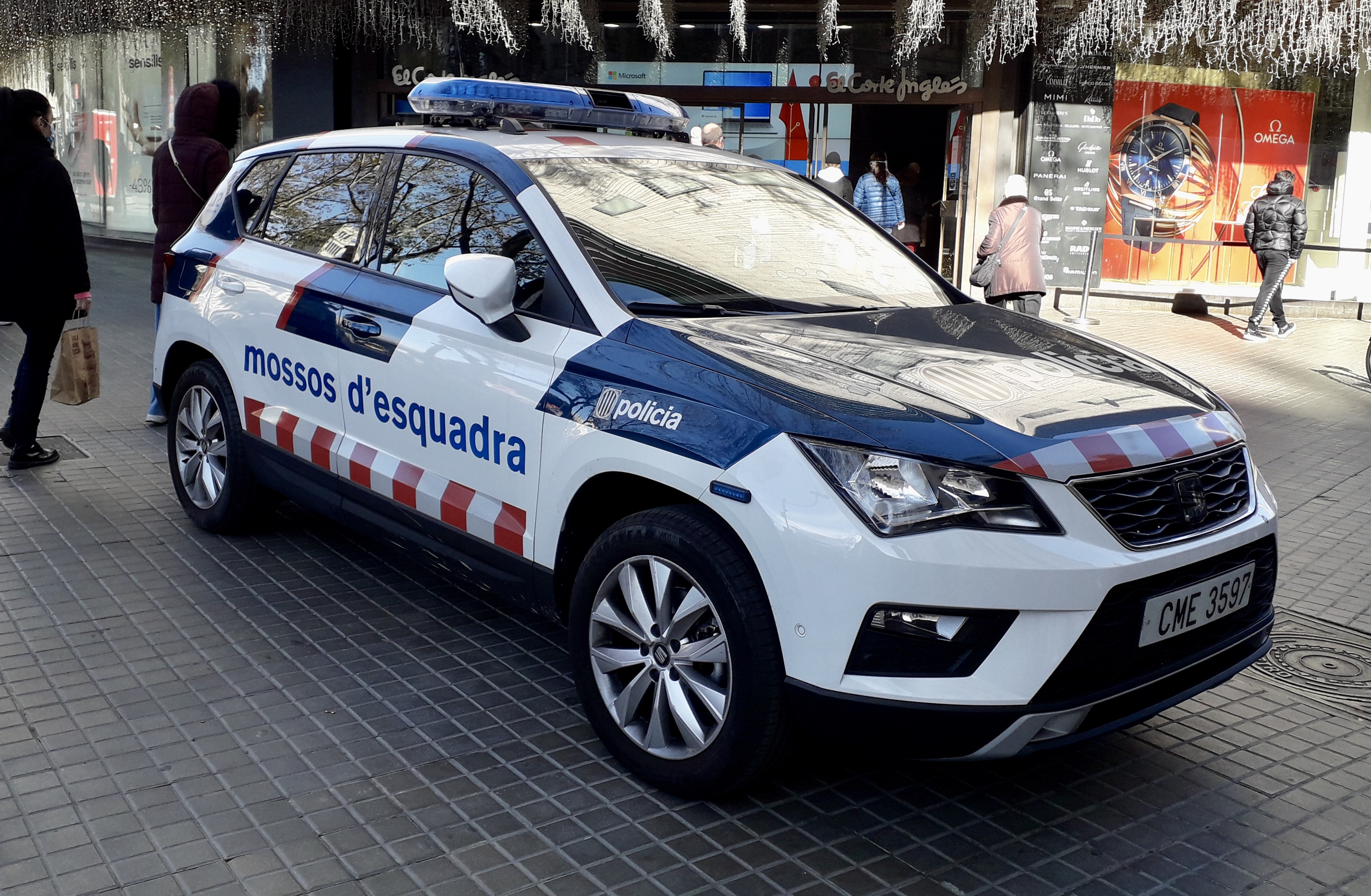
Patrol car.

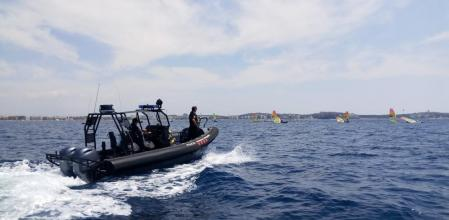
Maritime unit of Mossos d'Esquadra.

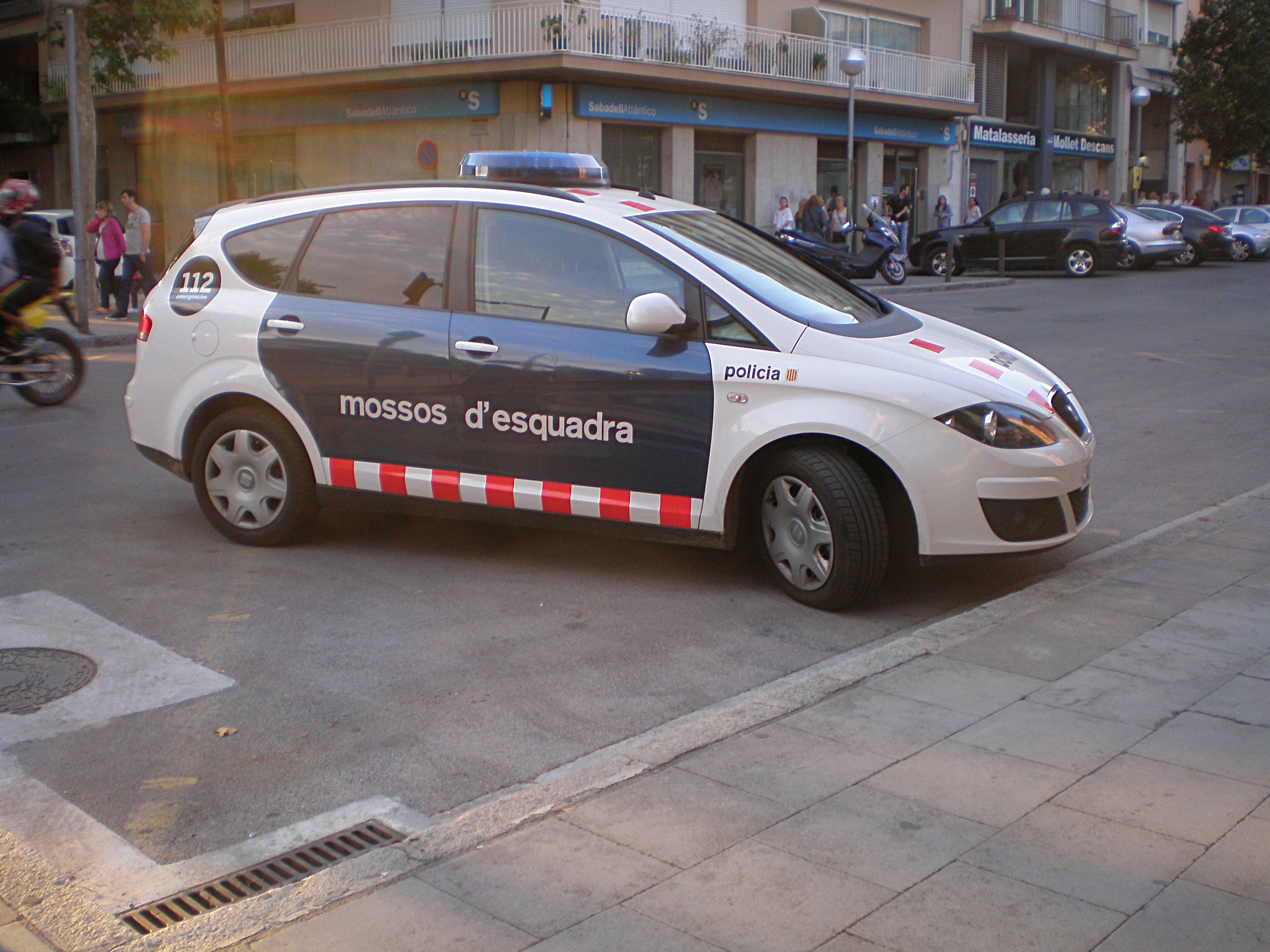
Old patrol car of the Mossos.

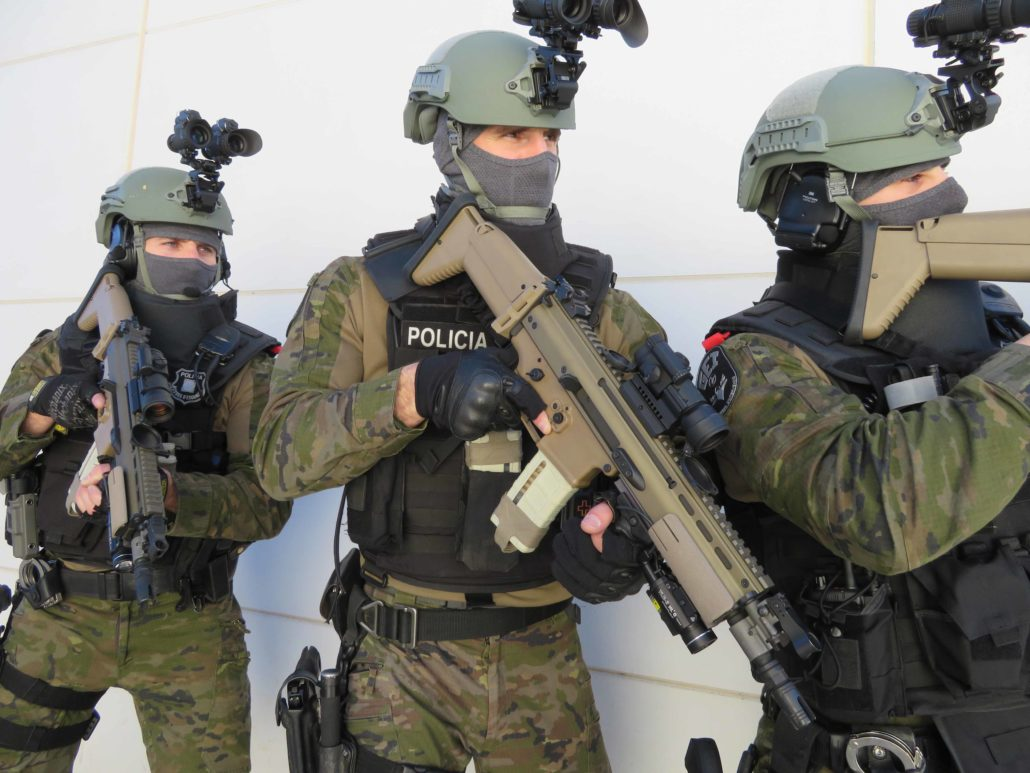
Special Intervention Group of the Mossos.

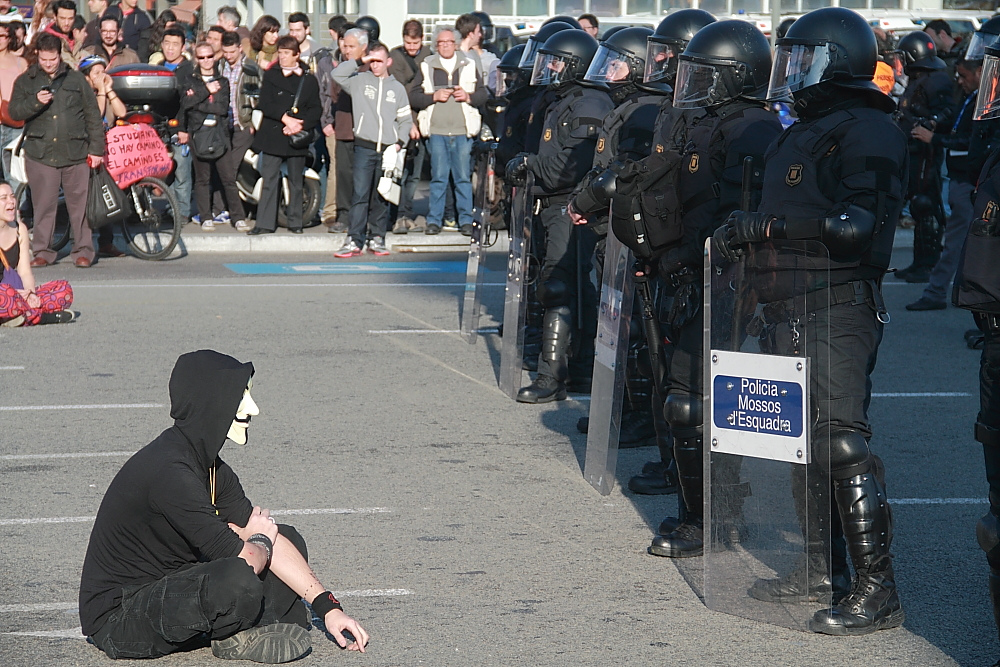
Mossos of the public order unit (BRIMO) in a protest.

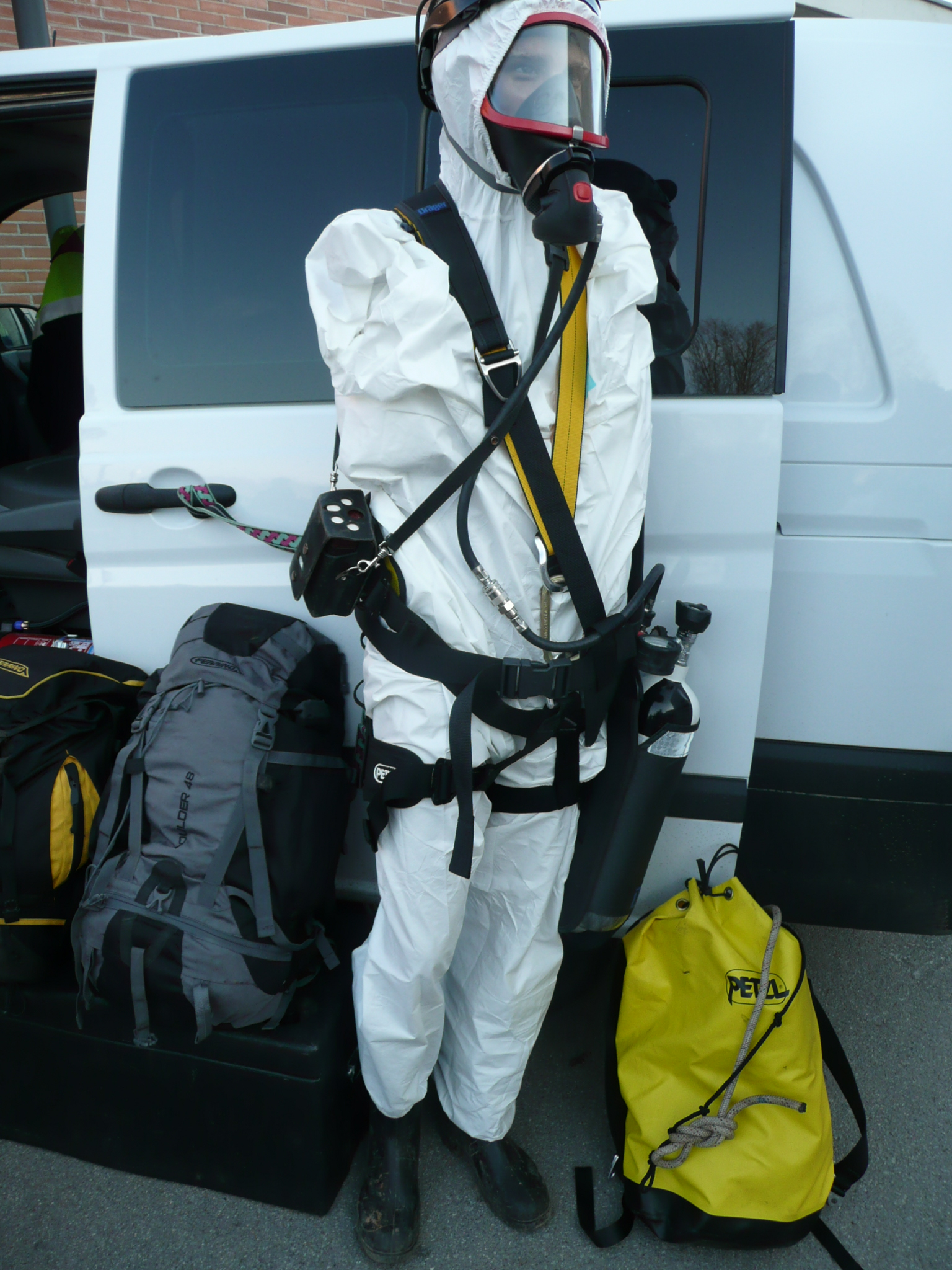
Equipment for entering the sewers.

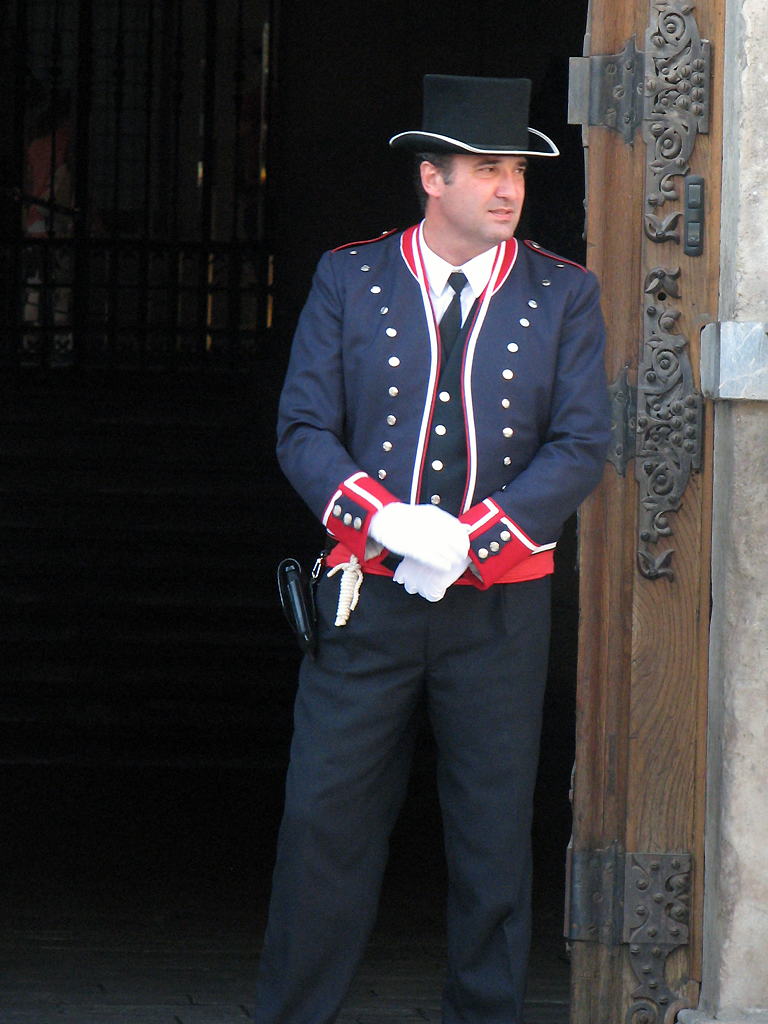
Mosso d'Esquadra in dress uniform.

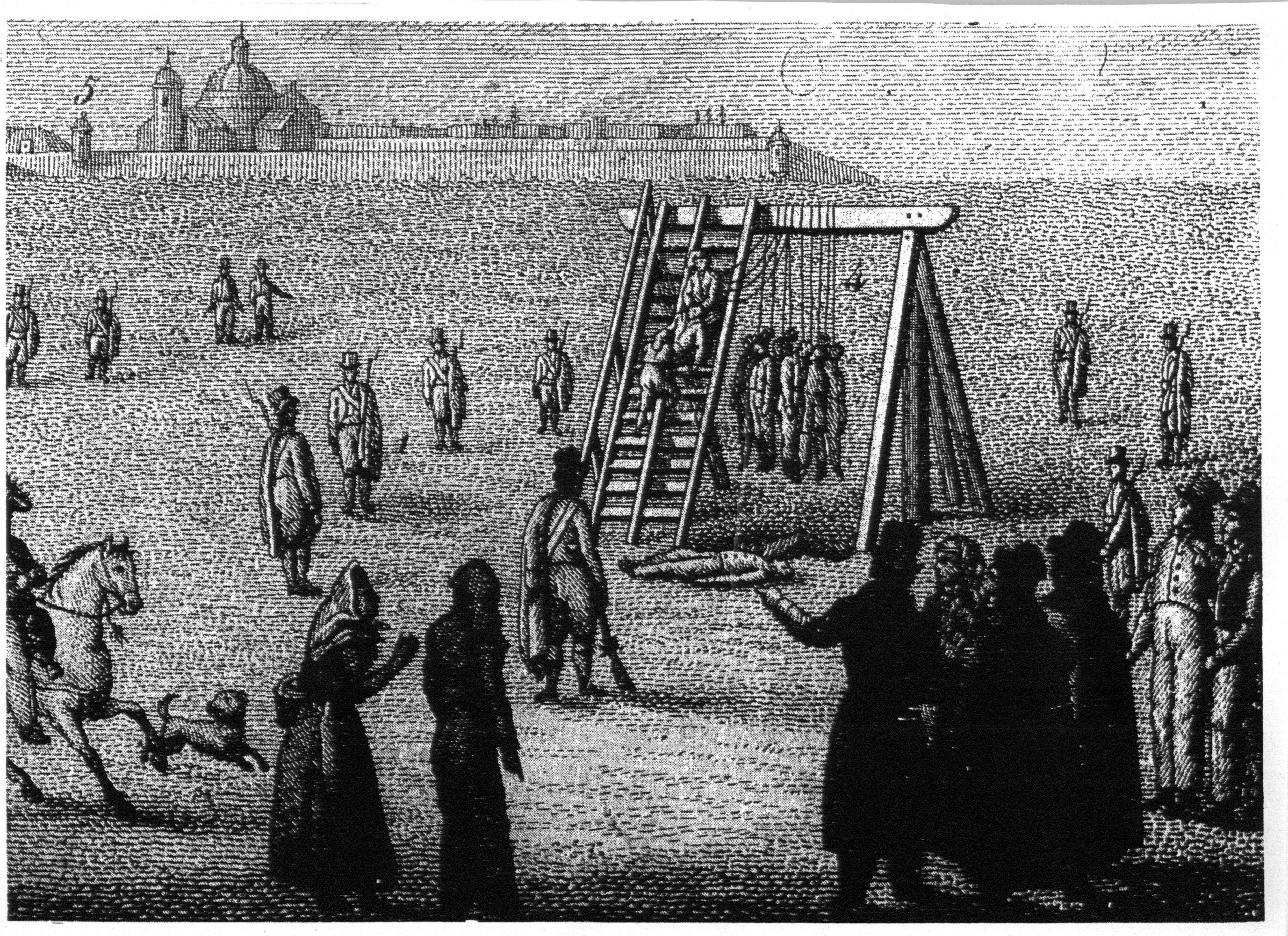
1714–1719, the soldiers are Mossos d'Esquadra.

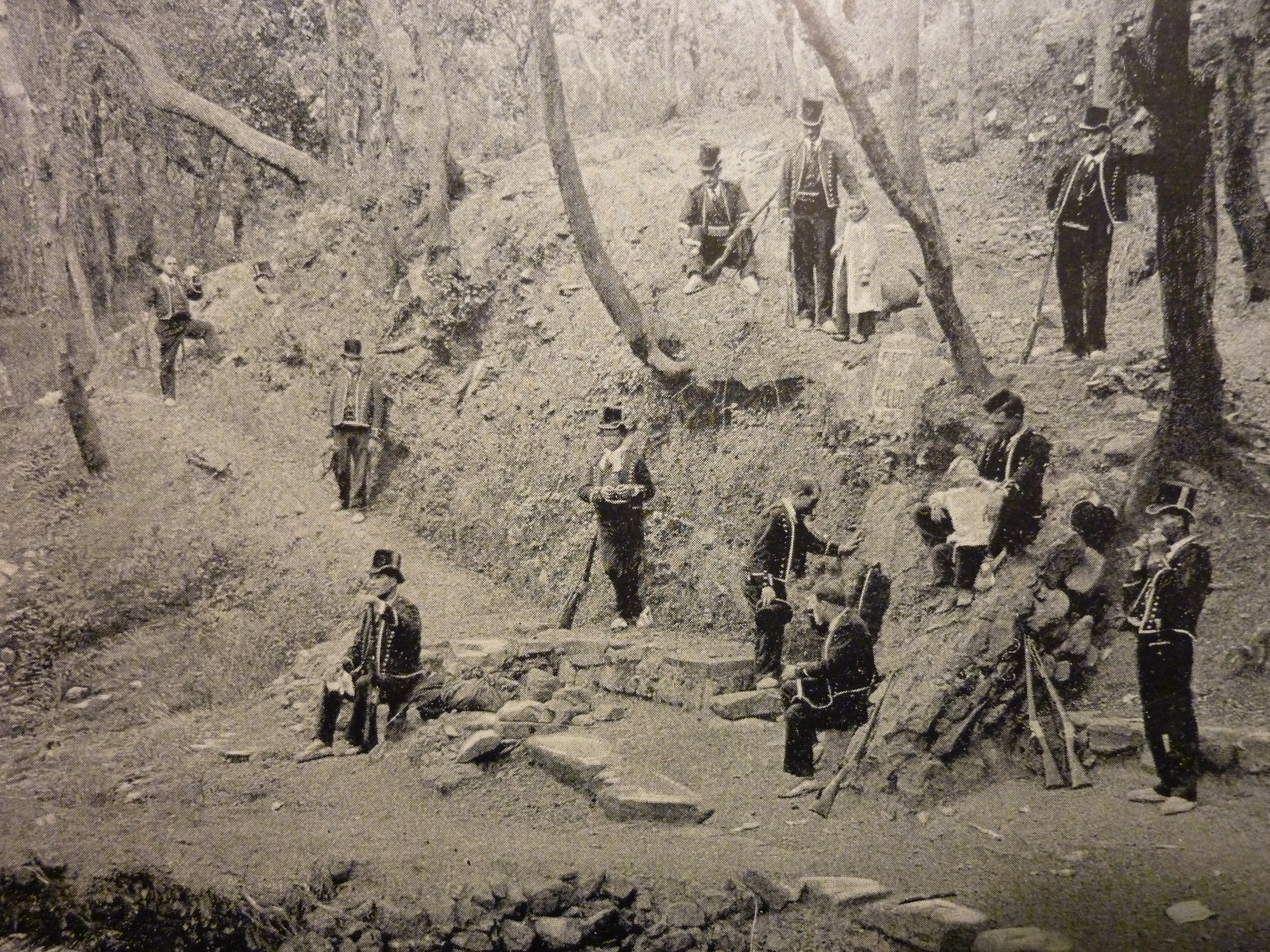
Forest tracking in XIX century.

== See also ==
- Guàrdia Urbana de Barcelona
- Corps of Firefighters of Catalonia
- Declaration of Independence of Catalonia
- Military history of Catalonia
- Sherwood syndrome
