= Guàrdia Urbana de Barcelona =

Local police force of Barcelona, Spain

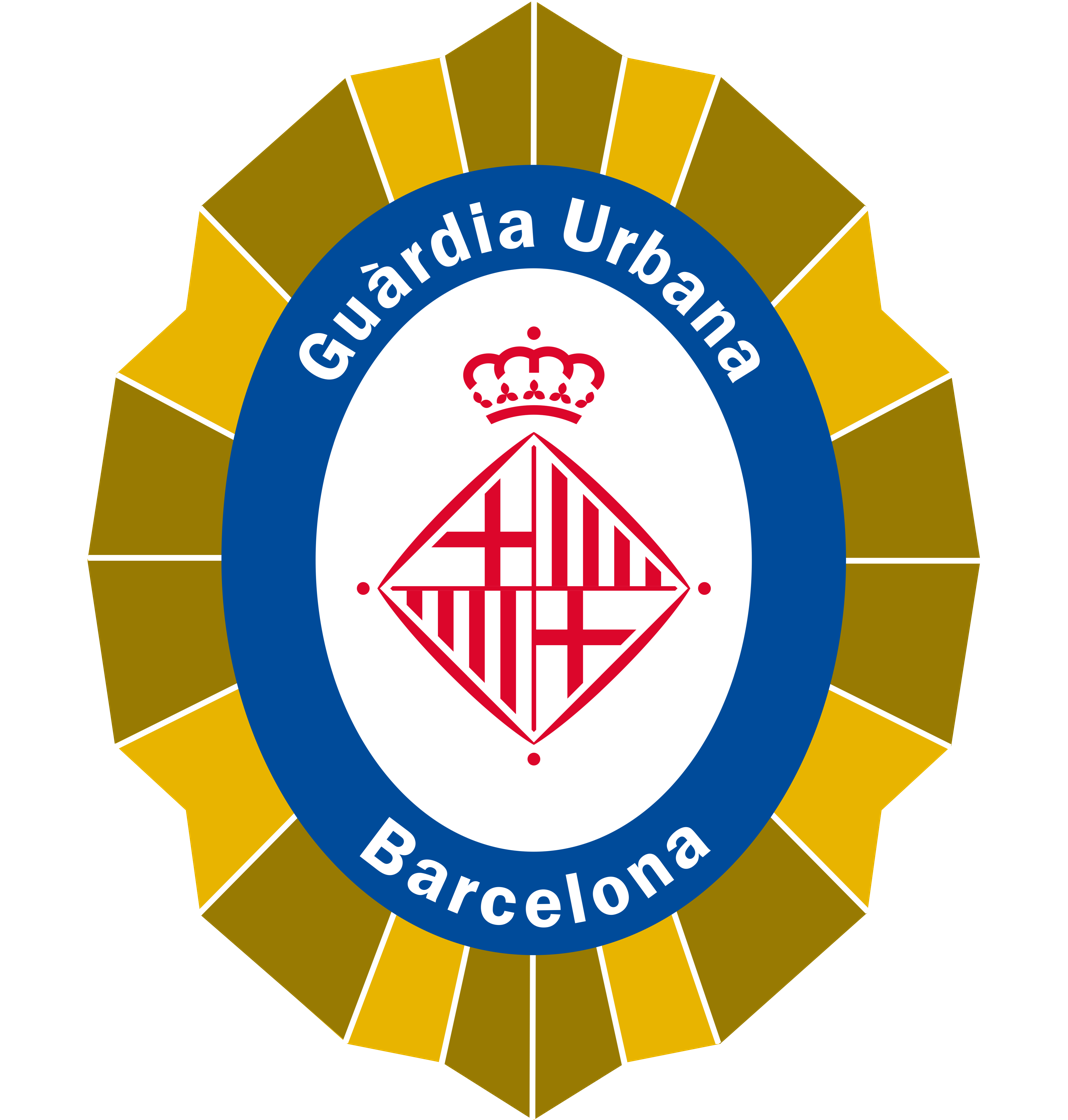
- Shield

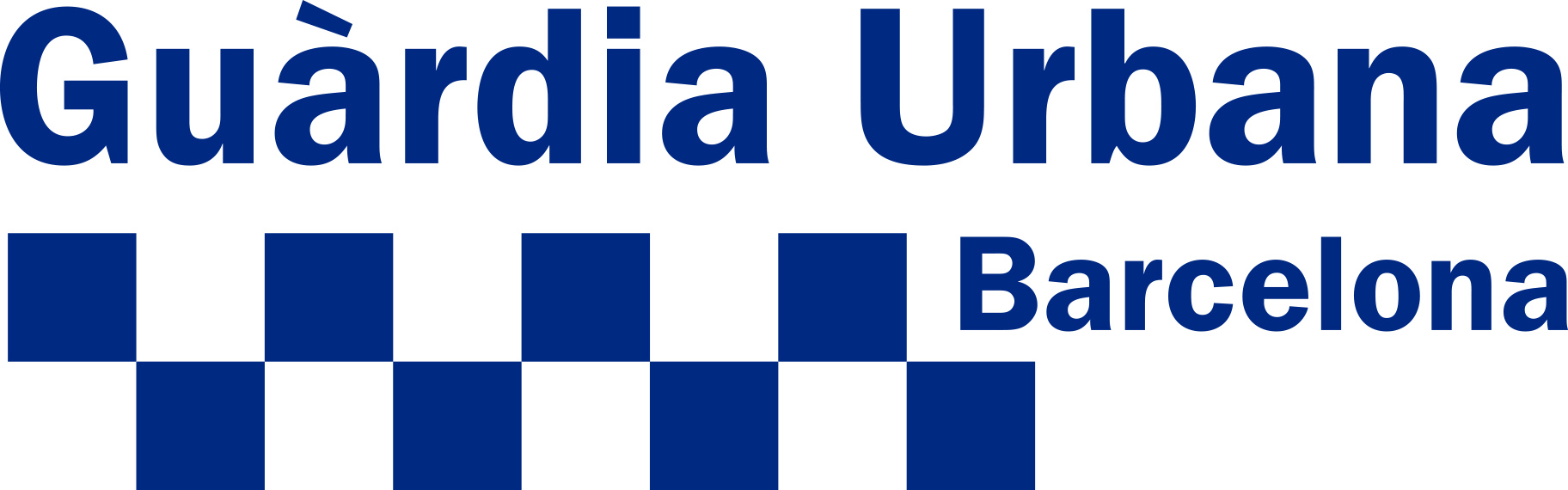
- Logo
- Common name: Guàrdia Urbana
- Abbreviation: GUB

Agency overview
- Formed: 8 December 1907
- Preceding agency: Guàrdia Municipal

Jurisdictional structure
- Operations jurisdiction: Barcelona, Catalonia, Spain
- Governing body: City Council of Barcelona
- General nature: Local civilian police

Operational structure
- Headquarters: 2 Guàrdia Urbana Street, Sant Martí, Barcelona
- Officers: ~3,500
- City Council responsible: Maite Català Pujol
- Agency executive: Pedro Velázquez Moreno, Superintendent

Notables
- Award: Medal of Honour of the Parliament of Catalonia (2017)

Website
- ajuntament.barcelona.cat/guardiaurbana/

The Guàrdia Urbana de Barcelona (English: Urban Guard of Barcelona; Commonly known simply as the Guàrdia Urbana or GUB) is the local police force of the city of Barcelona. The GUB is the 2nd-largest local police force in Spain, with approximately 3,500 officers.

== History ==
The first local police force in Barcelona was formed in November 1843 and named the Guàrdia Municipal (Municipal Guard) with "the duty of defending the neighbourhoods".

In 1907, due to the expansion of Barcelona causing increasing traffic jams, the Guàrdia Urbana was officially established with duties strictly related to road safety. Police officers were armed with a sabre, pistol, and a rifle, however following Tragic Week events in 1909 the force was demilitarized temporarily.

Later in 1921, the GUB absorbed the Municipal Guard and in 1941 the force underwent a severe reorganisation inspired from the English police model. In 1957, the Guàrdia Urbana started to patrol the streets of Barcelona with automobiles. During 1959–1968, Barcelona started installing traffic lights, which allowed GUB officers to gain more responsibilities regarding public safety.

In 1979, the first women joined the force.

During the early 2000s, the GUB began the digitization of the force: creation of a GPS-based fleet command, appearance of the first PDAs and adoption of the TETRA communications system.

The Guàrdia Urbana started to strengthen relationships with the other police forces operating in Barcelona at the time: the National Police Corps and the early Mossos d'Esquadra, with joint patrols for the 2004 Universal Forum of Cultures. In 2005, the Joint Command Room (GUB-Mossos-Bombers) was established.

During the decades of 2000 and 2010, the GUB continued its modernization of the force by improving systems, expanding with more officers and new units, gaining more responsibilities, fighting against internal gender inequality and integrating into the 112 system.

In August 2017, the Guàrdia Urbana played a crucial role during the 2017 Barcelona attacks, alongside other public services, when a terrorist drove a van into pedestrians on the emblematic Rambla street leaving 13 people dead and 130 injured. GUB officers were among the first public services to respond and attend to the victims.

== Duties ==
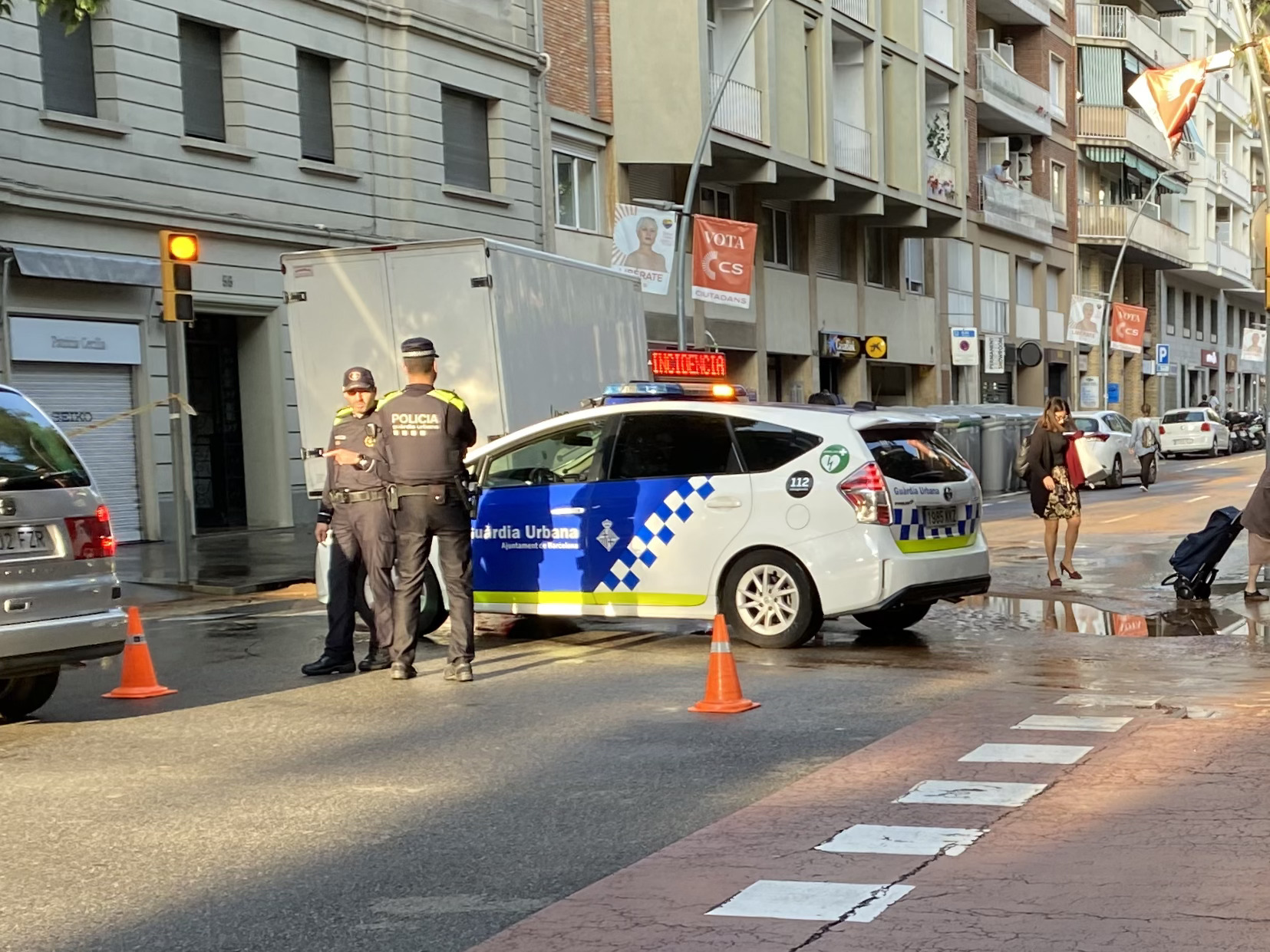
GUB officers closing a road

The Guàrdia Urbana, as the local police force, is responsible for:

- Public safety, ensuring the safety of people and property (alongside the Mossos d'Esquadra).
- Road safety, preventing and handling traffic incidents.
- Administrative policing, conducting inspections of establishments to ensure compliance with local law.
- Local policing, establishing relationships with the community.
- Protection of local authorities and facilities.

In addition and extraordinarily, the GUB cooperates with the judiciary prosecutor in the investigation of some crimes and provides assistance to gender-based violence victims and their children.

== Organisation ==
The Guàrdia Urbana is politically governed by the Manager of Safety, Prevention and Community Cohesion of the City Council, who appoints the Head of the Guàrdia Urbana. From the Head of the GUB depend the divisions and units of the force.

GUB facilities

Most officers are assigned to the force's Territorial Division: they patrol, respond to incidents, and take reports. This division is composed of one Territorial Unit for each district of the city:

- UT01: Ciutat Vella
- UT02: Eixample
- UT03: Sants-Montjuïc
- UT04: Les Corts
- UT05: Sarrià-Sant Gervasi
- UT06: Gràcia
- UT07: Horta-Guinardó
- UT08: Nou Barris
- UT09: Sant Andreu
- UT10: Sant Martí

Other divisions in the GUB are:

- Traffic Division: Units dedicated to investigate traffic accidents, handle accident reports and operate traffic cameras. They patrol Barcelona's highways and surface roads.
- Operational Resources and Support Division: Composed of UREP (Emergency and Outreach Reinforcement Unit, supports complex operations and public order), Daytime Support Section (officers that patrol all districts to give support when needed), Horseback Section, Investigation Unit, and Beach Section (operational during summer season).
- Protection Unit: Tasked with the protection of the City Hall and local government authorities.
- Coordination Division: Operates the Joint Command Room (with Mossos d'Esquadra and Bombers de Barcelona), plans operations, and handles public works traffic disruptions.
- Strategy and Logistical Support Division: Handles police intelligence, weapons training, and logistics.

== Ranks ==
After passing the 'opposition', applicants must graduate from the Institut de Seguretat Pública de Catalunya (Public Safety Institute of Catalonia) and pass a 12-month probationary officer period to officially become permanent public servants.

Guàrdia Urbana Rank Structure
Rank (Catalan)	Rank (English)
Indent/a Major	Superintendent
Intendent/a	Intendant
Inspector/a	Inspector
Sotsinspector/a	Deputy Inspector
Sergent/a	Sergeant
Caporal/a	Corporal
Agent	Officer

== Equipment ==
Police officers carry extensible batons, Walther P99 firearms, and PDAs. Some officers with advanced training carry Taser electroshock weapons and body cameras. Most patrol vehicles are equipped with an AED, cones, police tape and additional riot protection.

== Vehicles ==
The Guàrdia Urbana disposes of the following vehicles types:

- Ford Kuga composes the majority of the patrol fleet since 2024.
- Previously: Toyota Prius V, Citroën, SEAT Altea XL and SEAT Toledo patrol cars.
- Renault Trafic and Citroën Jumpy vans.
- Nissan Pathfinder 4WD vehicles.
- Honda F 250 and Piaggio scooters.
- Polaris dune buggies.
- Yamaha XT 600 E (off-road) and Honda ST1300 E (traffic division) motorbikes.

== Gallery ==
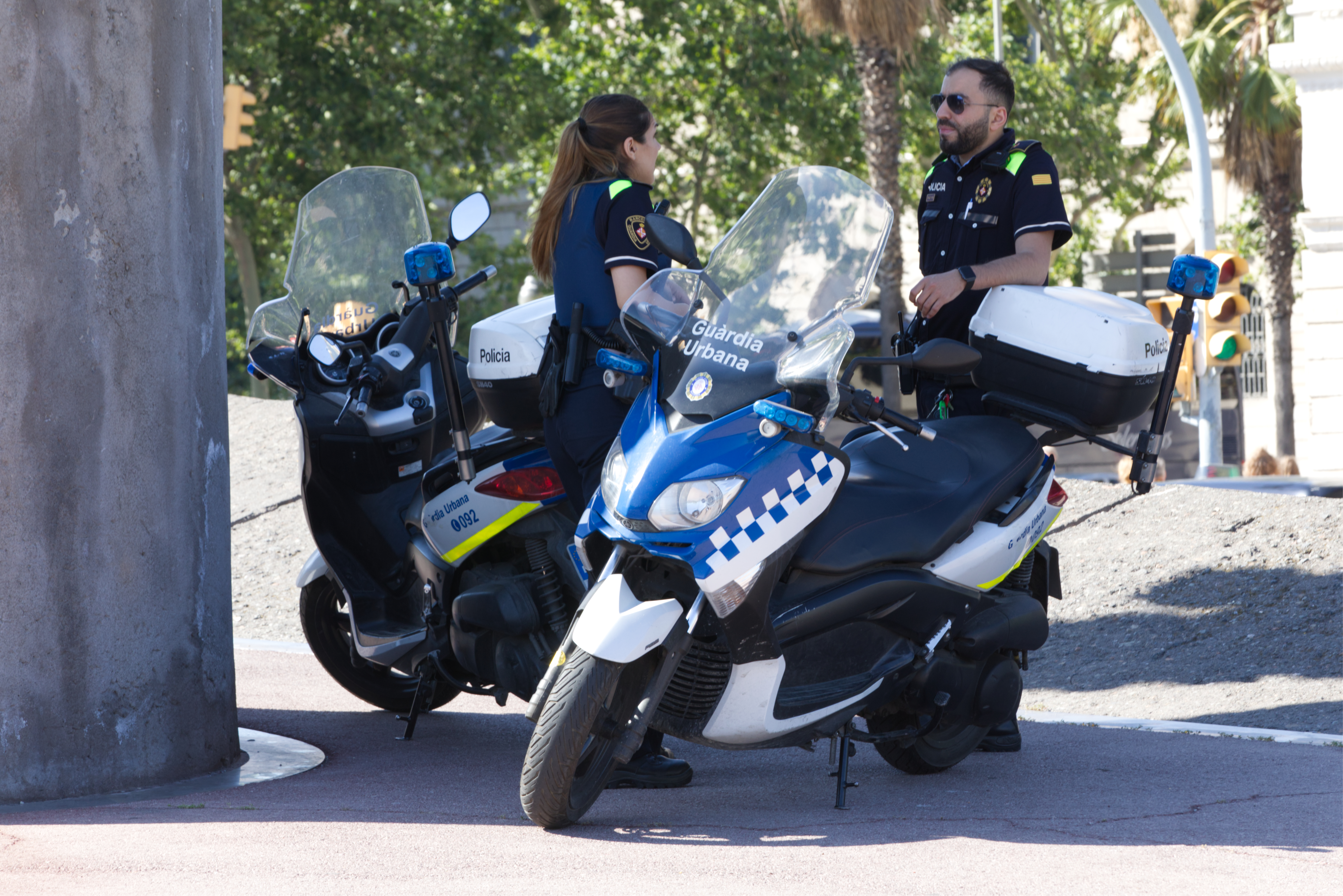
Patrol officers with scooters.

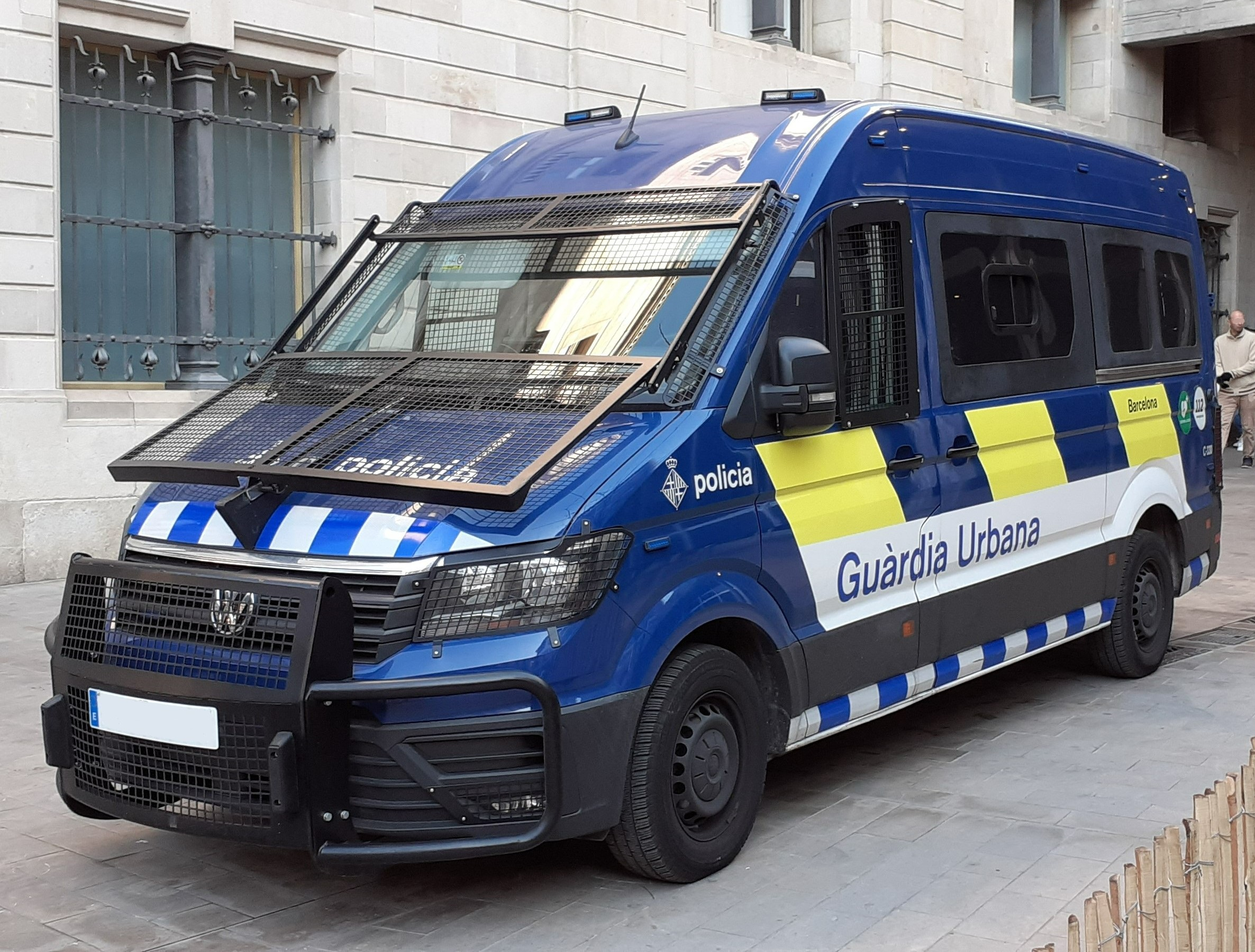
UREP van.

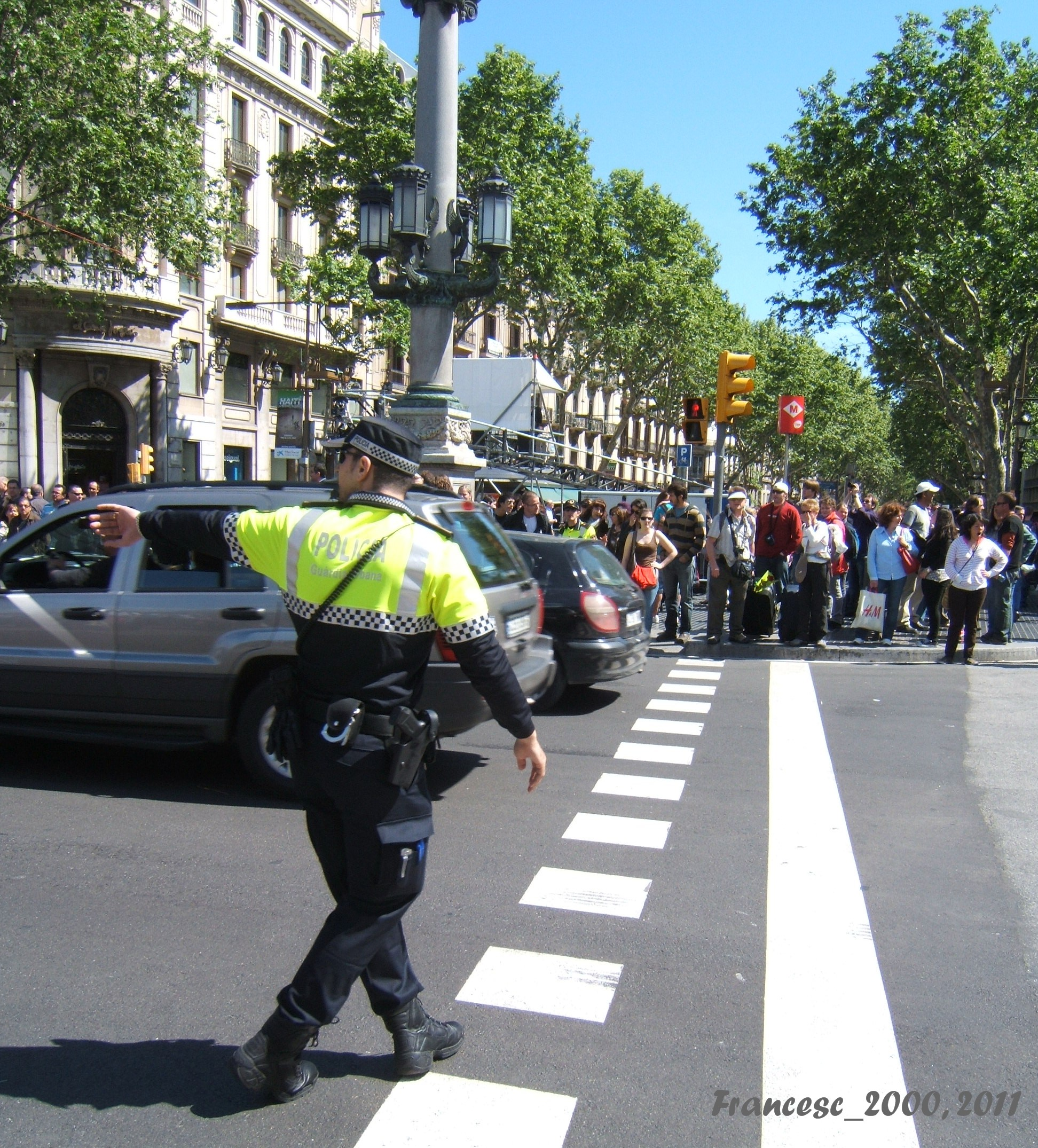
Officer handling traffic (old uniform) during Saint George's Day.

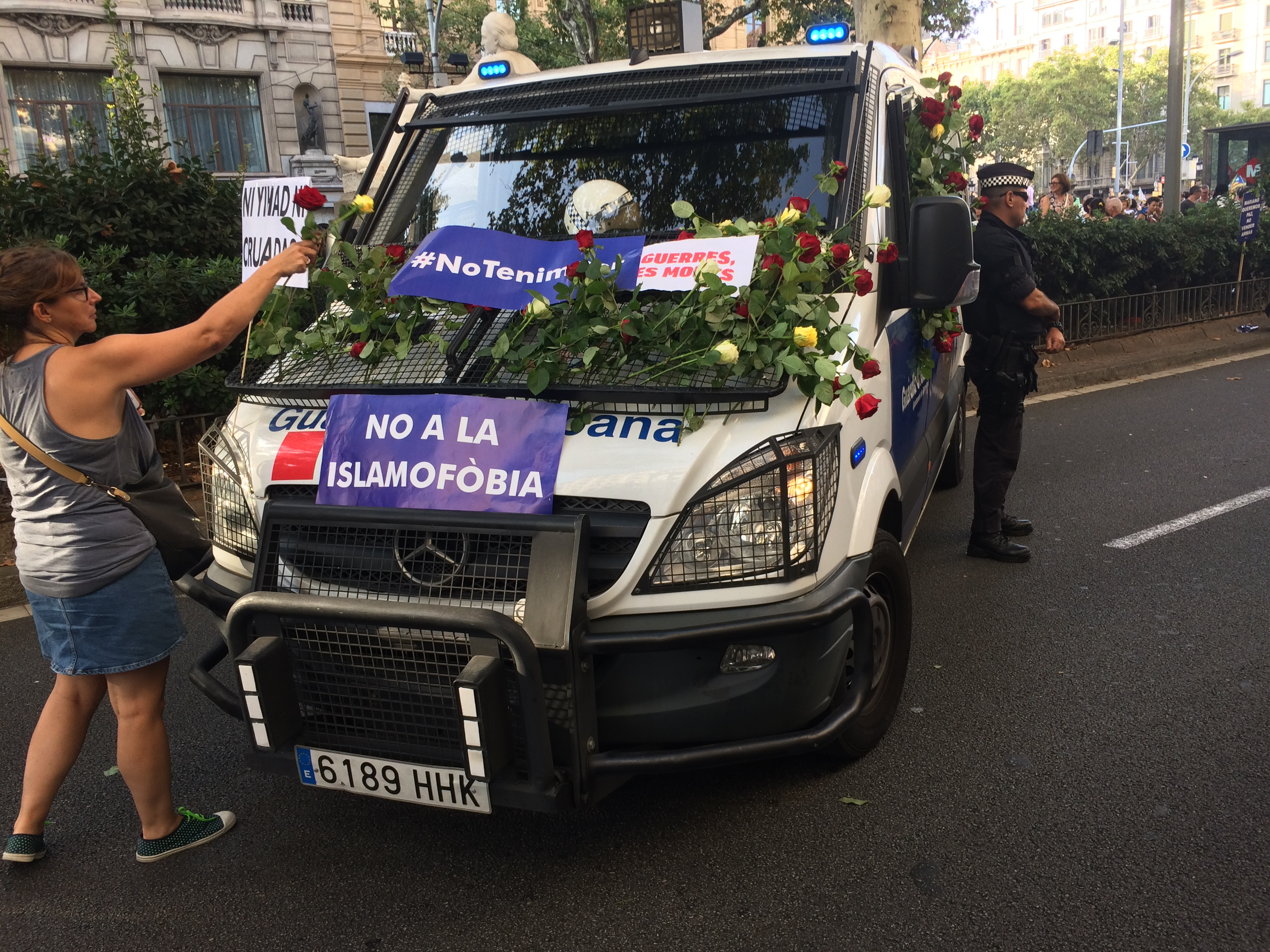
A woman leaves a flower in a GUB van after the 2017 Barcelona attacks.

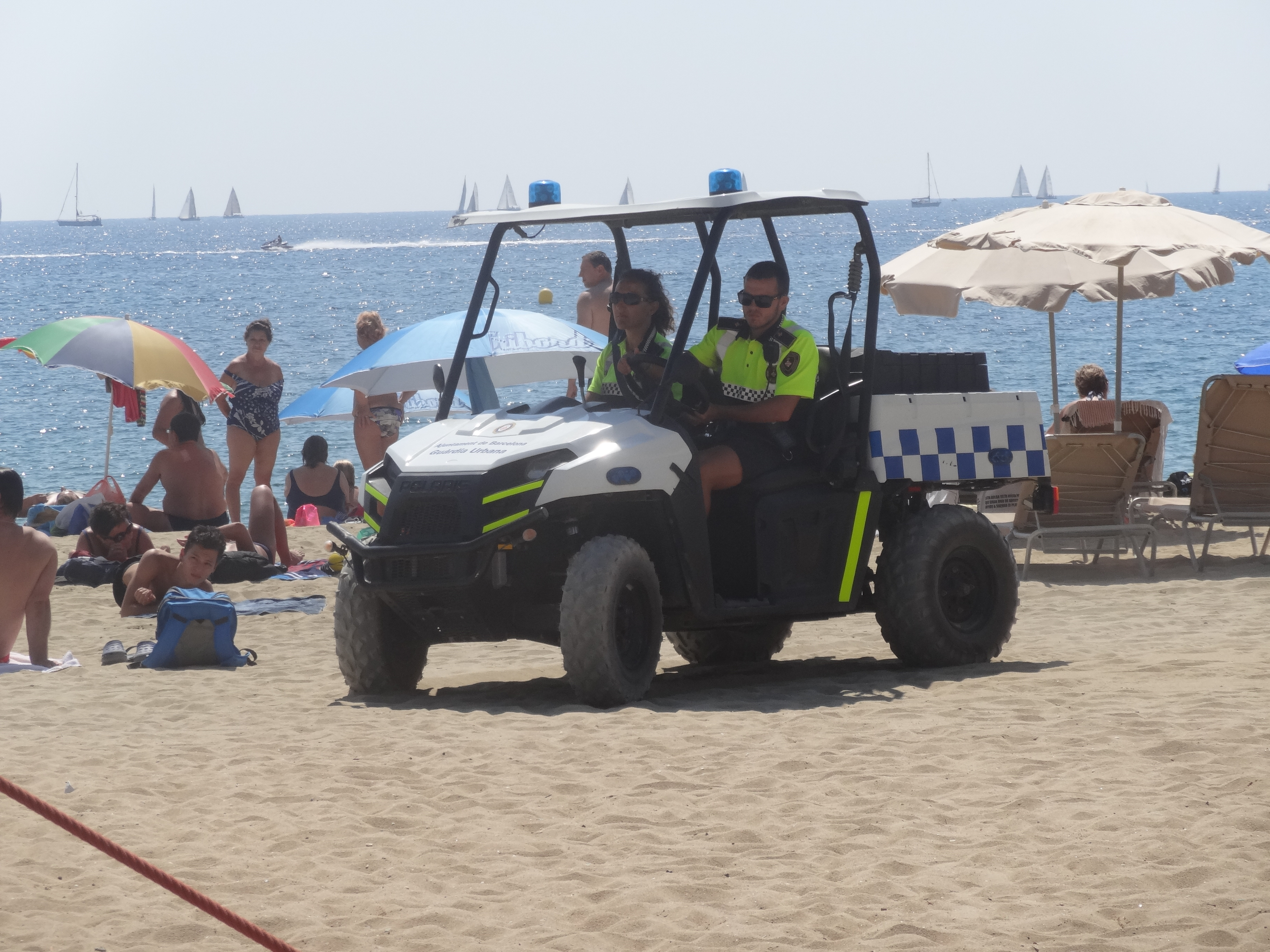
Beach Section officers in a Polaris UTV.

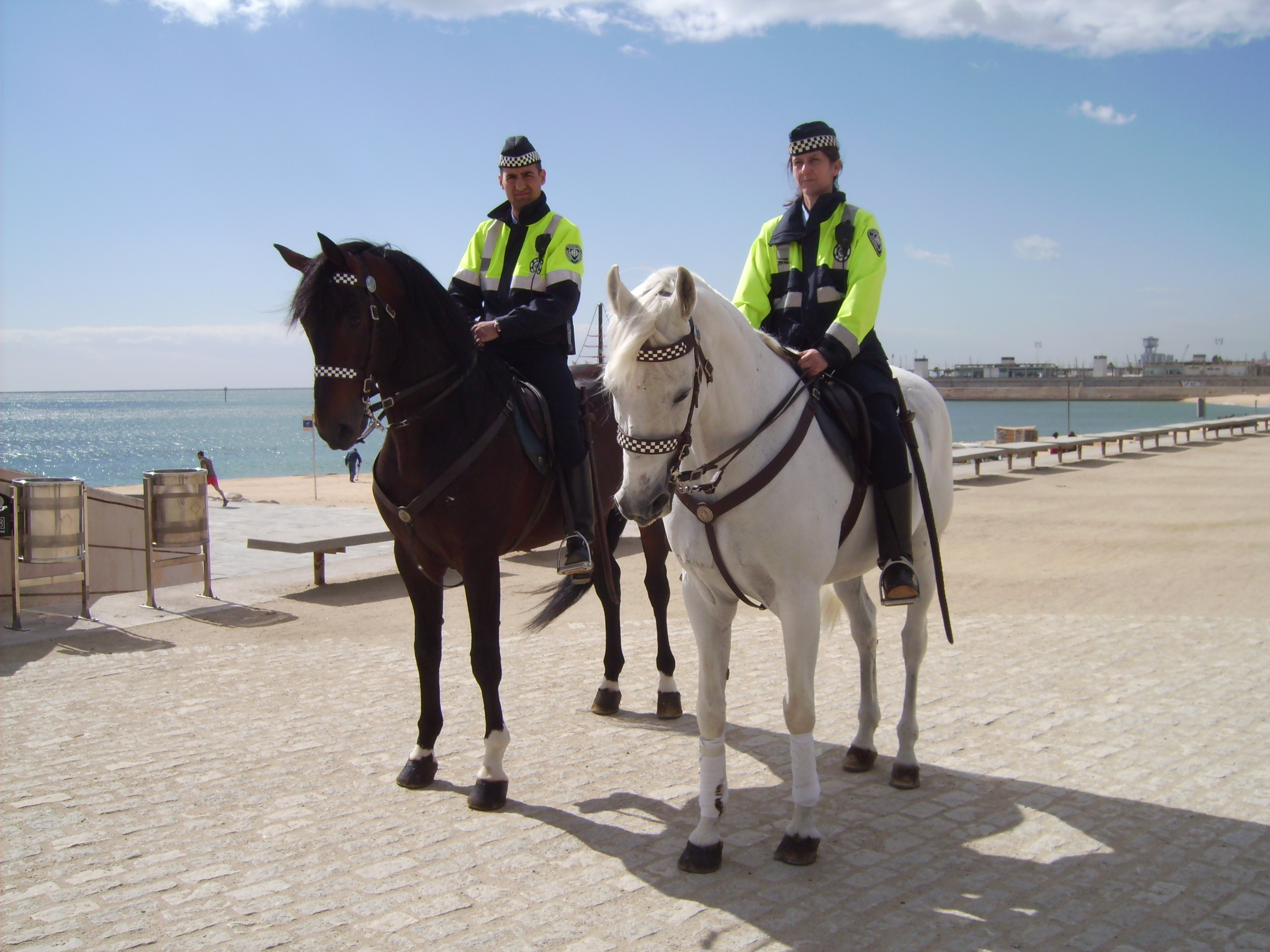
Horseback Section officers patrolling.

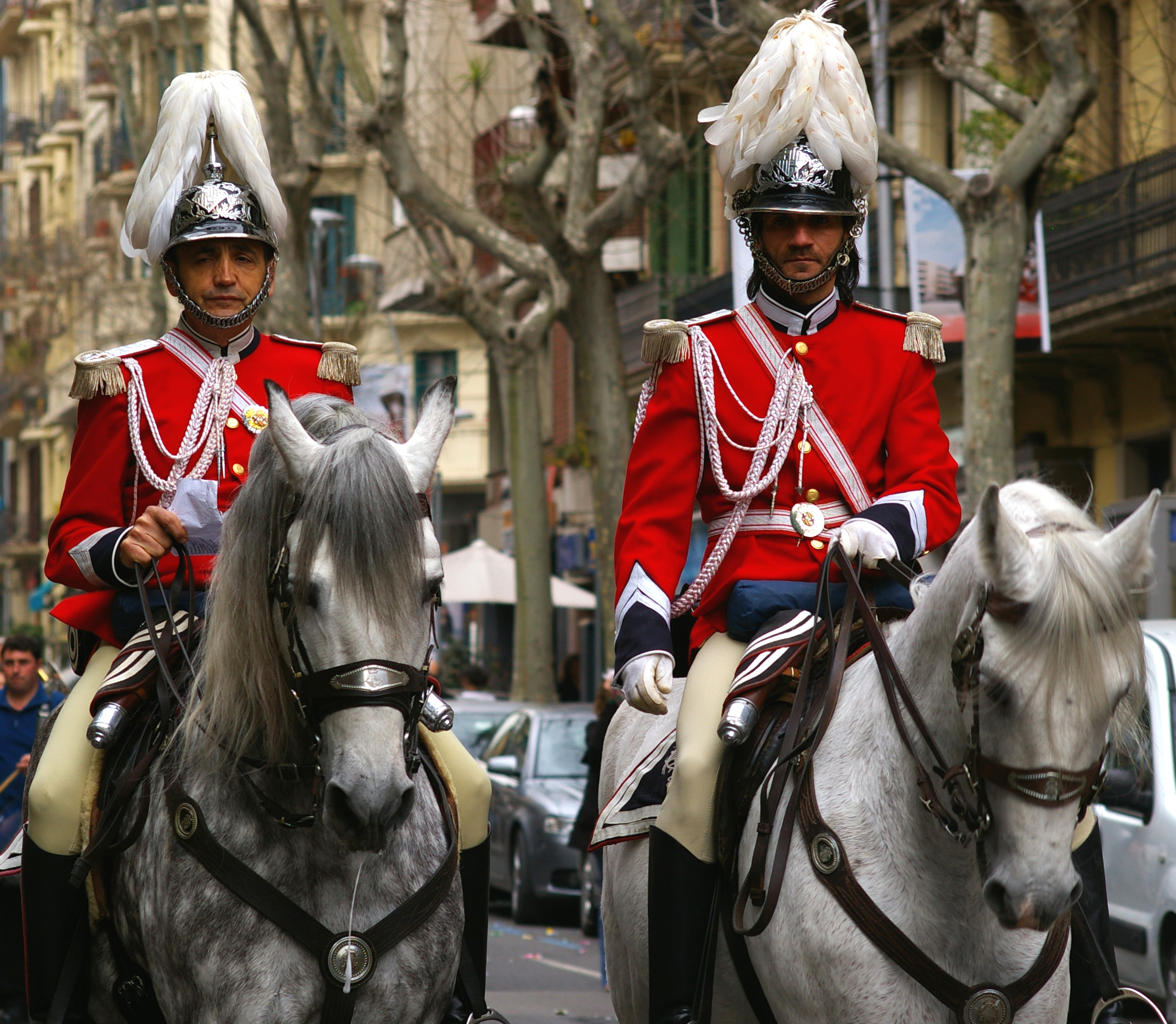
Horseback Section in ceremonial dress.

== See also ==
- Law enforcement in Spain
- Mossos d'Esquadra
- Corps of Firefighters of Catalonia
