= Corps of Firefighters of Catalonia =

Fire department of Catalonia, Spain

Bombers de la Generalitat de Catalunya Catalonia Firefighters

Operational area
- Country: Spain
- Autonomous community: Catalonia
- Address: Carrer Diputació 355, Barcelona

Agency overview
- Established: 27 June 1980
- Employees: 2,333 career firefighters and 2,057 volunteers (2016)
- Fire chief: Juli Gendrau i Farguell

Facilities and equipment
- Stations: 149 (2016)
- Engines: 332 (2016)
- Trucks: 357 (2016)32 (2016)
- Ambulances: 3 (2016)

The Corps of Firefighters of Catalonia (in Catalan: Cos de Bombers de la Generalitat de Catalunya) is the fire department of Catalonia, Spain. The body was established on June 27, 1980, shortly after the second restoration of the Government of Catalonia. It has responsibility managing all tasks related to firefighting, fire prevention, civil protection, maritime rescue, and traffic accidents.

The corps is part of the Ministry of the Interior of Catalonia, led by Joan Ignasi Elena, and have a hierarchical chain of command. The body has 149 stations, which are distributed in 7 emergency regions: Center, Girona, Lleida, Metropolitan North, Metropolitan South, Tarragona and Terres de l'Ebre.

In recognition of the service and the work carried out, the body was awarded the Gold Medal of the Generalitat of Catalonia on 11 September 2009.

== Tasks ==
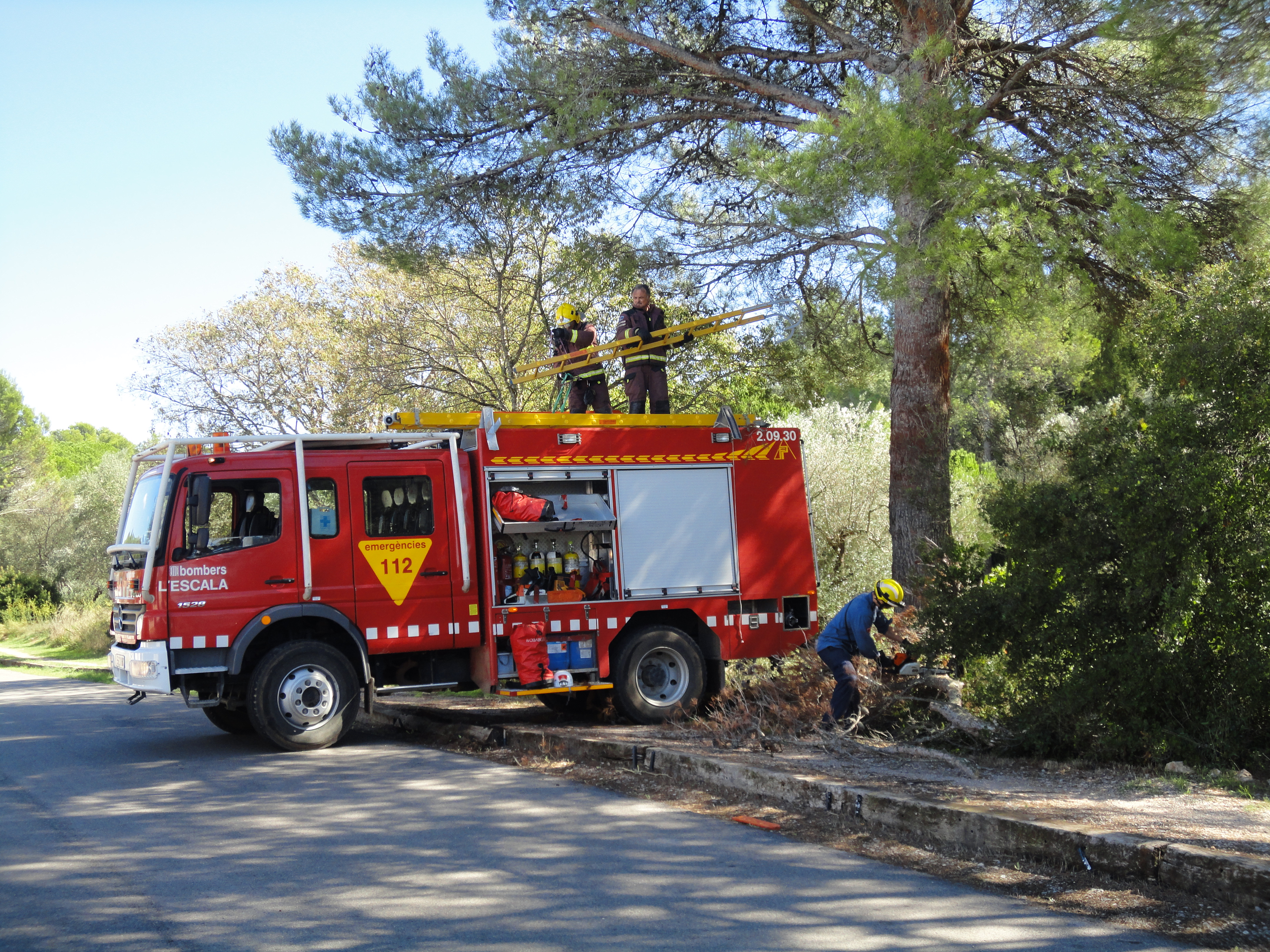
Catalan firefighters cutting down a tree to prevent fires near L'Escala in 2010.

According to the Law 9/2010, the Firefighters of Catalonia have the following tasks:

- Fire extinguishing while trying to minimise damage, both personal and material.
- Develop prevention activities to avoid fires and accidents.
- Study and investigate techniques, facilities and systems to increase fire protection.
- Participate in civil protection operations.
- Perform rescue tasks in difficult access rivers and mountains.
- Investigate and analyse the accidents under their jurisdiction.
- Provide information and formative activities for the general public.
- Act in service of public interest.
- Other actions stipulated in the current legislation documents.

== See also ==
- Guàrdia Urbana de Barcelona
- Mossos d'Esquadra

== Bibliography ==
- Saura i Laporta, Joan; Mestre Campi, Jesús; Ferrer i Murillo, Marc; Savalls, Carles; Rovira, Joan; Lanau, Olga (2009). Bombers de Catalunya: història i present [Firefighters of Catalonia: past and present] (PDF) (in Catalan). Barcelona: Departament d'Interior. ISBN 978-84-393-8002-3.
