= La Directa =

- Categories: Newsmagazine
- Frequency: Biweekly
- Founded: 18 April 2006
- Company: La Directa, SCCL
- Country: Spain
- Based in: Barcelona
- Language: Catalan
- Website: directa.cat

Setmanari de Comunicació Directa, usually known as La Directa, is a biweekly magazine in Catalan language published in Barcelona and distributed in paper and digital format. It operatives as a consumers' co-operative. The headquarters are in Sants, a neighbourhood of Barcelona, even though it has correspondents in several places of the Catalan Countries as well as other parts of the world. It covers a wide range of topics mostly related to left-wing politics, social movements, social economy and Catalan independence movement, including news, investigation and debate articles.

== Awards ==
- 2010: Memorial Josep Vidal i Llecha
- 2014: Special mention Premi Solidaritat
