= Capdevila =

Capdevila (pronounced [ˌkabdəˈβilə]) is a Catalan surname, literally meaning 'Upper Town'. Notable people with the surname include:

- Andreu Capdevila (1894–1987), Spanish textile worker, trade unionist and politician
- Carles Capdevila (1965–2017), Spanish journalist and writer
- Celso Capdevila (born 1984), Paraguayan footballer
- Daiana Capdevila (born 1987), Argentine chemist
- Francisco Moreno Capdevila (1926–1995), Mexican artist
- Frederic J. Porta i Capdevila (born 1996), Spanish historian and political scientist
- Jaume Capdevila (born 1974), Spanish cartoonist and caricaturist
- Javier Perez-Capdevila (born 1963), Cuban scientist, mathematician and academic
- Joan Capdevila (born 1978), Spanish footballer
- Joan Capdevila i Esteve (born 1965), Spanish veterinarian and politician
- Jorge H. Capdevila (born 1940), Chilean-American biochemist and academic
- José Luis Capdevila (born 1981), Spanish footballer
- Marc Capdevila (born 1974), Spanish swimmer
- Ramon Vila Capdevila (1908–1963), Spanish anarchist
- Roser Capdevila (born 1940), Chilean-American biochemist and academic
- Xavier Capdevila Romero (born 1976), Andorran ski mountaineer
- Vicenç Capdevila (1936–2020), Spanish lawyer and politician

== See also ==
- General Capdevila, Chaco Province, Argentina
- Capdevilla
- Soldevila
