= Carles Capdevila =

Catalan journalist

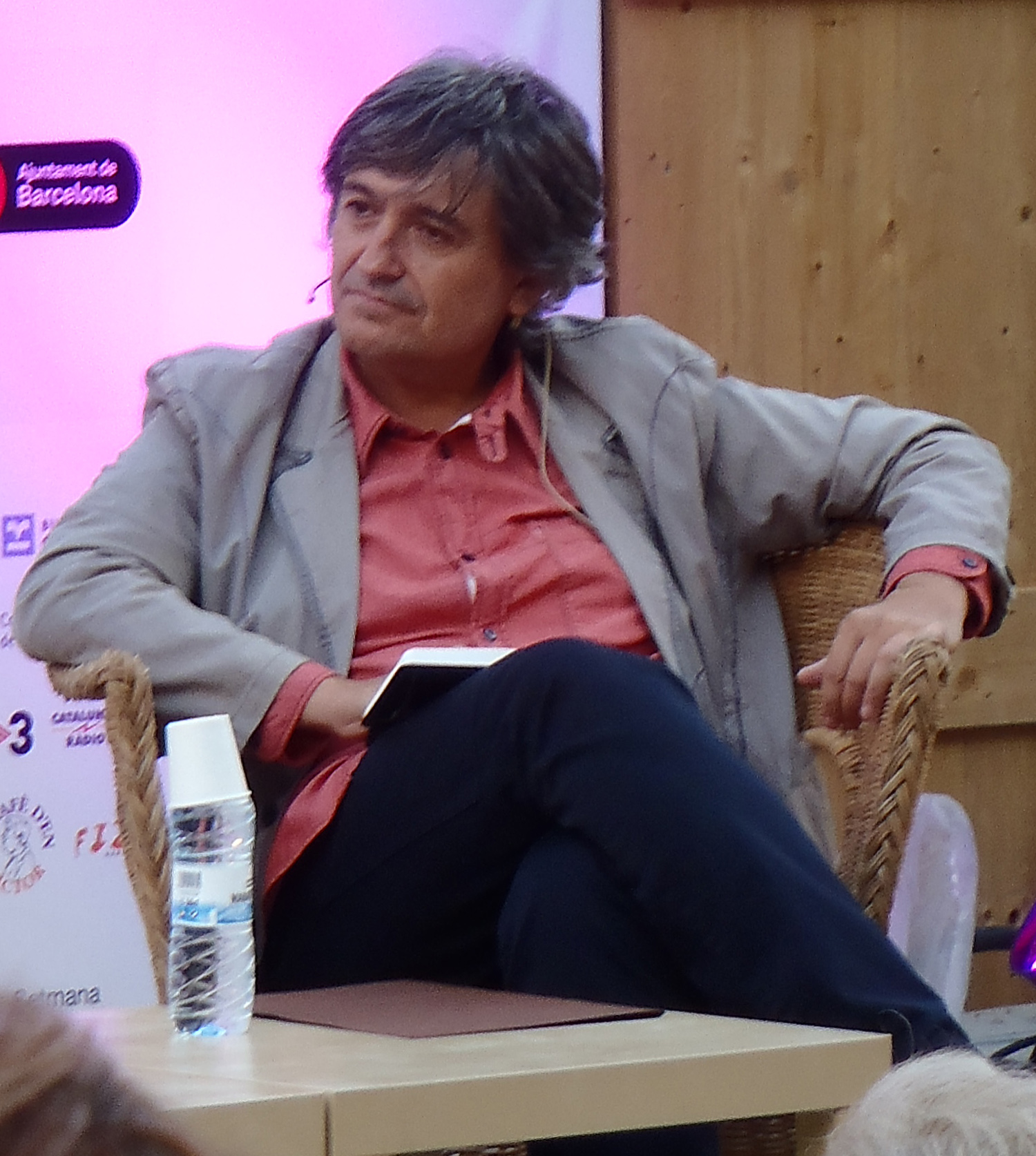
- Born: 13 August 1965; Els Hostalets de Balenyà, Catalonia
- Died: 1 June 2017 (aged 51); Barcelona, Catalonia
- Occupations: Journalist, writer

Carles Capdevila i Plandiura (Els Hostalets de Balenyà, Osona, 13 August 1965 – Barcelona, 1 June 2017) was a Catalan journalist and writer, director of the newspaper Ara for its first five years and from 28 November 2015 onwards founding director. He presented and directed the programmes Eduqueu les criatures in Catalunya Ràdio and Qui els va parir in TV3. He was deputy director of the program Malalts de tele. He directed the section Alguna pregunta més?, within El matí de Catalunya Ràdio. He received the humor and satire award 'Premi Pere Quart d'humor i sàtira' in 1999 for the book Criatura i companyia and in 2016 the National Prize for Communication. He died from colorectal cancer on 1 June 2017.

== Biography ==
When he was young, he started on radio with the program Guirigall on Ràdio Pista. Graduated in philosophy and journalist, he was editor of the Society section of the newspaper Avui and then became head of this area. From 1992 to 1994 he lived in New York as a press correspondent and from this stay came the book Nova York a la catalana, which portrays all kinds of Catalan ties with the city in the last one hundred and fifty years.

With a long career in the press, radio and television, he was the founding director of the newspaper Ara, after having been its director for five years, from the moment it first took to the streets on November 28, 2010, coinciding with the elections to the Parliament of Catalonia in 2010. Among others, he has been an opinion columnist for the newspapers Avui, El Periódico de Catalunya and El 9 Nou (1995–2010), director and host of the program Eduqueu les criatures (Catalunya Ràdio), director and presenter of the program Qui els va parir (TV3), and contributor to El club and Divendres (TV3). During his time at Catalunya Ràdio, he was the creator of the "Tió solidari" for the Fundació Banc dels Aliments. He also collaborated with the radio program Minoria absoluta (RAC 1) team.

He wrote several books, such as Criatura i companyia (Premi Pere Quart d'humor i sàtira 1999) and, under the collective pseudonym Germans Miranda, El Barça o la vida and Tocats d'amor. He also wrote texts for books of The Triplets, illustrated by Roser Capdevila i Valls.

On August 23, 2015, he announced to newspaper workers that he had been diagnosed with colorectal cancer, and on August 30, he published it to readers. As of that moment he decided to continue his professional activity but adapting it to his new situation of health.

On November 28, 2015, on the fifth anniversary of Ara's birth, Carles Capdevila left the newspaper's management to become its founding director. In 2015, he received Marta Mata Award from the Rosa Sensat Teachers' Association and the City of Barcelona Media Award for his constant efforts to defend education through the media. In November 2016 he received the National Prize for Communication in the press category, for his "great sense of ethics and dignity" at the forefront of the start-up and early years of the newspaper diari Ara.

== Works ==
- Nova York a la catalana. Barcelona: La Campana, 1996. Awarded with 'Premi del Llibre de la Generalitat de Catalunya 1998'. Third edition, 1996.
- Photos by Oriol Molas, texts by Carles Capdevila. El ritme de la ciutat. Vic: Eumo, 1998. Awarded with 'Premi del Llibre de la Generalitat de Catalunya 1998'.
- Germans Miranda: El Barça o la vida. Barcelona: Columna, 1999
- Criatura i companyia. Barcelona: La Campana, 1999. Awarded with 'Premi Pere Quart d'humor i sàtira'. Eight edition, 2007
  - Bebé y compañía Barcelona: RBA, 2000
- Xavier Graset and others: El món s'acaba. Com superar el 2000. Barcelona: Columna, 1999
- Germans Miranda: Tocats d'amor. Barcelona: Columna, 2000
- Jo vull ser famós. Barcelona: La Campana, 2002
- Illustrations by Roser Capdevila, texts de Carles Capdevila. Les tres bessones i el iogurt. Barcelona: Cromosoma, 2002
  - Las tres mellizas y el yoghourt. Barcelona: Cromosoma, 2002
- Antoni Bassas and others: Alguna pregunta més? Antologia de 10 anys de disbarats. Barcelona: La Campana, 2004. Reprinted, 2004
- Entendre el món, 2015
- Educar millor, 2015
- La vida que aprenc, 2017

=== The Triplets' collection Les tres bessones: una Mirada al Món ===
Illustrations by Roser Capdevila, texts by Carles Capdevila.

- Les tres bessones van de marxa a Sant Cugat (2002)
- Les tres bessones i els tres escombriaires (2002)
- Les tres bessones i la gossa avorrida (2003)

=== The Triplets' collection Les tres bessones: una Mirada al Món ===
Illustrations by Roser Capdevila, texts by Carles Capdevila.

- Les tres bessones fan les paus (2001)
  - Tres mellizas hacen las paces (2001; Barcelona: Círculo de Lectores, 2004)
- Les tres bessones i el planeta del formatge (2001, 2002)
  - Las tres mellizas y el planeta queso (2001, 2004)
- Les tres bessones i l'olimpíada més especial (2003)
  - Las tres mellizas y la olimpiada más especial
- Les tres bessones i les tres erres [(redueix, reutilitza, recicla)] (2001)
  - Las tres mellizas y las tres erres (2001)
- Les tres bessones: la volta al món en tres pantalons (2004)
  - Las tres mellizas y la vuelta al mundo en tres pantalones
- Les tres bessones marquen un gol (2002)
  - Las tres mellizas marcan un gol (2002)
- Les tres bessones no baden (2001, 2002)
  - Las tres mellizas están en todo (2002)
- Tres bessones, tres gotes d'aigua (2001)
  - Tres mellizas, tres gotas de agua (2001)

== Awards and recognitions ==
- 1999 – 'Premi Pere Quart d'humor i sàtira' for the book Criatura i companyia
- 2015 – Marta Mata Media Award
- 2016 – National Prize for Communication
- 2016 – City of Barcelona Media Award
