= Medalla d'Honor del Parlament de Catalunya =

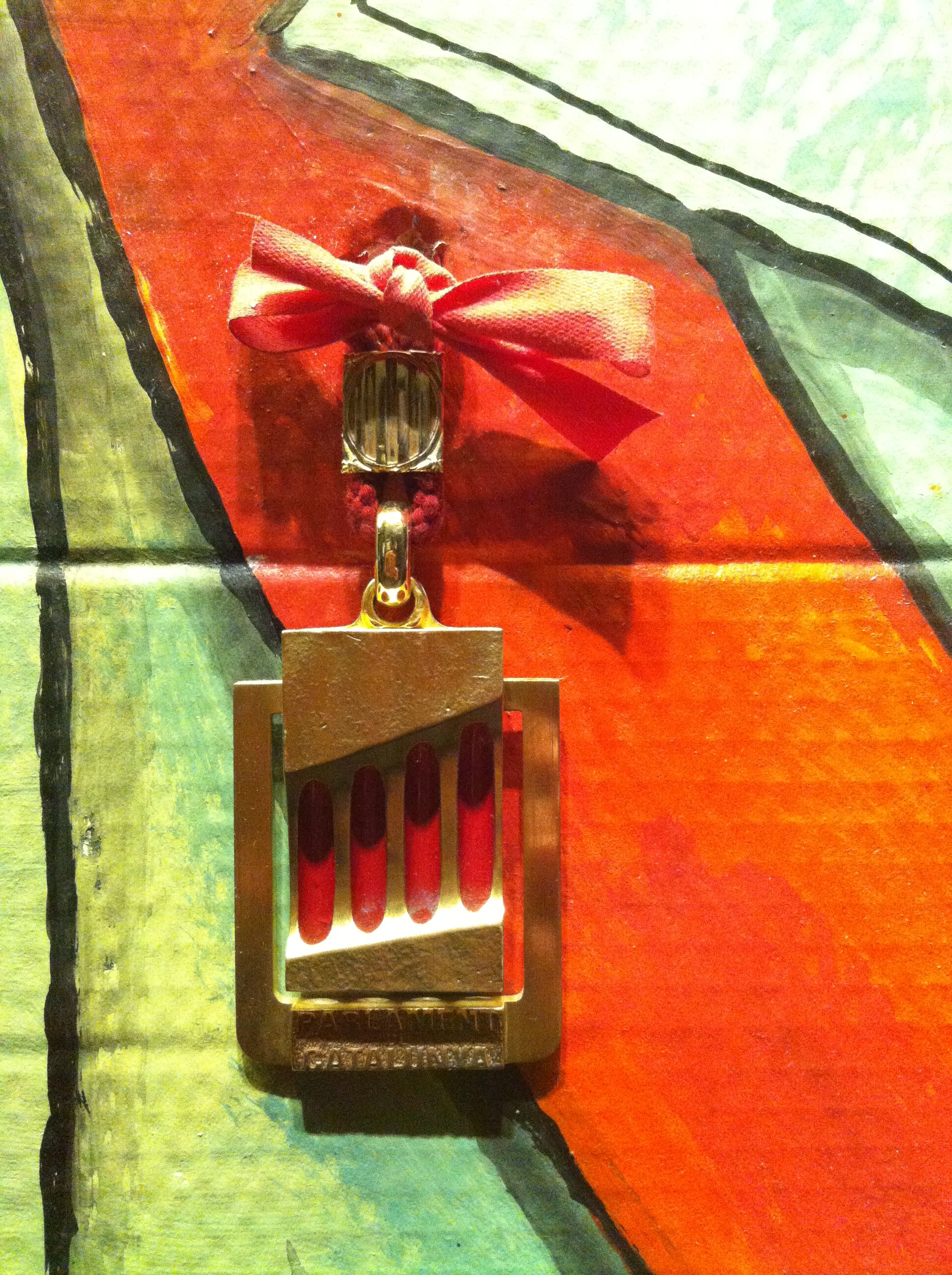
Roser Capdevila's medal

The Medalla d'Honor del Parlament de Catalunya (Catalan: [məˈðaʎə ðuˈnoɾ ðəl pəɾləˈmen də kətəˈluɲə]; "Medal of Honour of the Parliament of Catalonia") is a civil honorary distinction awarded by the Parliament of Catalonia since 2000, recognising members of the Parliament and other people living in Catalonia for their careers and contributions to the region, as well as exceptional service.

== History ==
Recipients of the honour receive a medal in recognition; unlike for example the Catalonia International Prize, which comes with financial award but no designated honour. The medal resembles the Four Bars (which may be recognised as the Senyera with top-to-bottom stripes) and was based on a design created by Antoni Cumella i Serret in 1984. (Note: The notices issued by the Parliament of Catalonia on the subject refer to Cumella i Serret by the name "Antoni Comella".) In 2000, goldsmith Joaquim Capdevila i Gaya adapted the design so it could be produced as medals.

In the first year it was awarded, the honour was bestowed upon the Parliament of Catalonia's former presidents, as well as Desmond Tutu, an esteemed guest to the region.

There have been several posthumous recipients. In 2001, Ernest Lluch (d. 2000) was recognised for the honour posthumously, with his daughters receiving the award on his behalf. In 2007, the members of Els Setze Jutges were awarded, together with their promoter Lluís Serrahima; of the members of the group, Miquel Porter i Moix (d. 2004) and Delfí Abella (d. 2007) were honoured posthumously, while Guillermina Motta refused the distinction. One of the groups recognised in 2015 was the first elected officials of the restored Parliament of Catalonia following return to democracy, to recognise the 35th anniversary of such elections; of these first eight, Marta Mata had died in 2006.

== List of recipients ==
Year	Recipient(s)	Note(s)
2000	Heribert Barrera i Costa	Ex-presidents of the Parliament of Catalonia
2000	Miquel Coll i Alentorn	Ex-presidents of the Parliament of Catalonia
2000	Joaquim Xicoy i Bassegoda	Ex-presidents of the Parliament of Catalonia
2000	Joan Reventós i Carner	Ex-presidents of the Parliament of Catalonia
2000	Desmond Tutu	Peace activist and recipient of the Nobel Peace Prize
2001	Miquel Batllori i Munné	Historian
2001	Ernest Lluch	Politician (posthumous award)
2002	Francesc Vendrell i Vendrell	United Nations representative in Afghanistan
2003	Jordi Savall	Musician
2004	Montserrat Trueta i Llacuna	President of the Catalan Down's Syndrome Foundation
2005	Adolfo Pérez Esquivel	Peace activist and recipient of the Nobel Peace Prize
2007	Els Setze Jutges	Performance group who promoted Nova Cançó
2010	Roser Capdevila	Illustrator
2011	Josep Guardiola i Sala	Sportsperson
2012	Càritas Catalunya	Social group
2012	Òmnium Cultural	Cultural association
2013	Núria Gispert i Feliu	Social activist
2013	Carme Ruscalleda	Chef
2013	Anna Veiga Lluch	Researcher
2014	Josep Carreras	Singer
2015	Rosa Barenys i Martorell	The eight first deputies of the Parliament of Catalonia (Mata awarded posthumously)
2015	Maria Dolors Calvet i Puig	The eight first deputies of the Parliament of Catalonia (Mata awarded posthumously)
2015	Teresa Eulàlia Calzada Isern	The eight first deputies of the Parliament of Catalonia (Mata awarded posthumously)
2015	Concepció Ferrer	The eight first deputies of the Parliament of Catalonia (Mata awarded posthumously)
2015	Helena Ferrer i Mallol	The eight first deputies of the Parliament of Catalonia (Mata awarded posthumously)
2015	Marta Mata	The eight first deputies of the Parliament of Catalonia (Mata awarded posthumously)
2015	Trinitat Neras Plaja	The eight first deputies of the Parliament of Catalonia (Mata awarded posthumously)
2015	Assumpció Sallés i González	The eight first deputies of the Parliament of Catalonia (Mata awarded posthumously)
2015	Guttmann Institute	Facility for spinal cord injury treatment
2016	Manel Esteller	Researcher
2017	Mossos d'Esquadra	First responders during the 2017 Barcelona attacks
2017	Sistema d'Emergències Mèdiques	First responders during the 2017 Barcelona attacks
2017	Guàrdia Urbana de Barcelona	First responders during the 2017 Barcelona attacks
2017	Cambrils police service	First responders during the 2017 Barcelona attacks
2018	Rosa Sensat Teachers' Association	For significantly improving educational standards
2019	Carola Rackete	Human rights activists
2019	Òscar Camps	Human rights activists
2020	Health services of Catalonia	For the response to the COVID-19 pandemic
2021	Catalan independence activists who have suffered repression, and the lawyers who defend them (including the trial of Catalonia independence leaders)	For their contributions to Catalonia
2022	Núria Feliu	Catalan-language singer (posthumous award)
2022	Pau Riba i Romeva	Singer and songwriter in various languages (posthumous award)
2022	Joaquim Arenas i Sampera	Primary creators of the Catalan Education Service in 1978, the main body for Catalan-language immersion programmes in schools of the region
2022	Margarida Muset i Adel	Primary creators of the Catalan Education Service in 1978, the main body for Catalan-language immersion programmes in schools of the region
2023	FC Barcelona Femení	For their contribution to the success and positive perception of women's sports, and advocating for "social respect for women in sports" to create "a more fair and equal society in terms of rights and opportunities". (Note: The award was announced in July 2023, before the Rubiales affair and subsequent women's sports equality movement advocated by many players related to this club.)

== See also ==
- Gold Medal of the Generalitat of Catalonia
- Creu de Sant Jordi
- Catalonia International Prize
