= Soldevila =

Soldevila (pronounced [ˌsɔldəˈβilə]) or Soldevilla (pronounced [ˌsɔldəˈβiʎə]) is a Catalan surname, literally meaning 'Lower Town'. Notable people with the surname include:

- Adela Soldevila Galiana (1906–1988), Spanish Catholic woman considered for beatification
- Alba Soldevilla Novials (born 1987), Spanish politician
- Antonio Soldevilla (born 1978), Spanish footballer
- Ester Molné Soldevila (born 1977), Andorran judge, lawyer and politician
- Juan Soldevila y Romero (1843–1923), Spanish Roman Catholic prelate
- Laly Soldevila (1933–1979), Spanish actress
- Loló Soldevilla (1901–1971), Cuban artist
- María Isabel Soldevila (born 1977), Dominican journalist, academic, writer and television presenter
- Mariano Mullerat i Soldevila (1897–1936), Spanish beatified Catholic doctor and politician
- Oriol Soldevila (born 2001), Spanish footballer
- Paola Soldevila (born 1996), Spanish footballer
- Rina Soldevilla (born 1964), Peruvian writer and poet

== See also ==
- Capdevila
