= Mercè Company =

Catalan writer (born 1947)

Mercè Company i González
- Born: May 19, 1947 (age 79); Barcelona, Spain
- Occupation: Author
- Spouse: Agustí Asensio i Saurí
- Writing career
- Language: Catalan, Spanish
- Years active: 1973-1992, 2022-present
- Genres: Juvenile and youth literature
- Notable awards: Barcelona Medal of Honor; Catalan Children and Youth Literature Honors List
- Website: mercecompany-milfulls.cat

Mercè Company i González (Barcelona, 19 May 1947) is a Catalan writer in Spanish, Catalan and French languages. She is among the most prominent Catalan writers of fiction for children and young adults. She studied journalism and worked for several magazines and publishing companies. She has authored more than 170 books and her works have been presented on television, radio and theatrical stages. She has been recognized many times for her works in children's and youth literature.

== Cultural backdrop ==
Catalonia is a region of northeastern Spain that borders the Mediterranean Sea to its east and France to its north. In 1932, the Second Spanish Republic granted it a Statue of Autonomy. It opposed Generalissimo Francisco Franco's coup d'état against the Republic in 1938 and when he succeeded in seizing power, he revoked the statute and brutally oppressed the Catalans.

== Early life and education ==
This was the environment into which Company was born to Josep Company i Torres, a graphic artist, and his wife in the Catalonian city, Barcelona. Catalonia and all of Spain had been ruled by the dictator Franco for nine years when she was born. Under his regime, Catalan language, culture and political independence had been violently suppressed. In her childhood printing or publishing books in Catalan was illegal. So was using the language in public in any way. Catalan was only kept alive in verbal conversations at home and in literature published before the Spanish Civil War and kept at home. Adults in the authoritarian world around her routinely hid the truth, either with silence or with lies, and the language of her home was forbidden outside its walls. She told an interviewer in 2008 that this created a world of black outside her family and white within it. She therefore learned to mistrust adults, seeing them as a threat to her freedom as a child. This theme creeps into many of her works.

== Early career ==
Her father's career exposed her to the visual arts and decoration from an early age and she became familiar with them, experimenting with painting and photography. In university she studied fine art and journalism. She met cartoonist and illustrator Agustí Asensio i Saurí and married him in 1972. In her early adulthood she worked for newspapers and magazines but she became drawn to literature just when the elderly Franco's regime was crumbling. She felt she could express herself better in Catalan than in Spanish so she decided to write in that language. Her first effort was a 1973 collection of four stories for young children titled Els contes de l'oncle Agus (transl. Tales of Uncle August). Her husband illustrated the books and this began a lasting, fruitful creative partnership between them. The books dissatisfied her, though. She felt they were not well-written. Two years later Franco's dictatorship ended with his death and Spain transitioned to democratic rule. The Statute of 1979 returned some autonomy to Catalonia, including removing the ban on the language. Company was able to find the classes she needed to learn to write the language she had heard in her home from birth. She left journalism in 1981 to devote herself to all forms of literature except poetry. In 1983 legislation was passed making Catalan and Spanish co-official languages in Catalonia and establishing Catalan as the language to be used in public schools.

This was the backdrop to her busiest period of literary creativity. She wrote illustrated books for small children but also novels for older children and teens and, toward the end of the decade, for adults. Her storybook, Nana Bunilda menja Malsons (transl. Dwarf Bunilda Eats Nightmares) was released in 1985 to enthusiastic public and critical reception. She collaborated with Roser Capdevila and Enric Larreula to create the nine books in The Triplets series, which went on to become the Catalan production most widely spread across international and transmedia divides. By 1986 she had written dozens of storybooks for children, almost a dozen novels for preadolescents and two for teens. The second of these, published that year, was called La imbècil (transl. The Idiot). That same year she rewrote it into a screenplay for a feature-length film called Qui t'estima, Babel? (transl. Who loves you, Babel?). In 1988 La imbècil chosen as the best in Catalan children's literature by the International Board on Books for Young People as suitable for the international market. In 1989 she also wrote thirteen scripts for the animated television series, Los cuentos de Nana Bunilda (transl. Tales of Dwarf Bunilda), then created Ilborn and Company, the production company that produced these as a 13-episode series in 1991. Franco had also suppressed the Galician and Basque languages and Company worked with Carlos Casares Mouriño to translate some of her stories into Galician to help the effort to reclaim the language.

By the early 1990s, she had written one series of storybooks each year for ten years, with an average of eight books per series. She had written 40 more single storybooks, as well as 15 books for older children, five for adolescents and three for adults. Her books were being used in public schools. Company wrote in the style of Catalan she heard people speaking in the streets and she felt the demand for language suitable for use in schools restricted her. She also felt she had written all she could for young children and was concerned about repeating herself so she stopped writing storybooks. She founded Aula de Lletres, Escola de les Arts Escrites, a school for writers, in 1993 and began teaching writing. She and her husband were partners in adapting the animated Los cuentos de Nana Bunilda for television in Japan when he was killed in a traffic accident in Barcelona in 1994. This project was permanently suspended. In 1997 she created la Fundació Agustí Asensio as a nonprofit to foster creativity and communication in his memory.

== Later career ==
Company did not write another storybook, although new editions of previously published books were produced in 2002. She remained, however, creatively active. She collaborated with her daughter Gisela Asensio to write 35 radio scripts for L'hora del vici (transl. The Time of Vice) in 1997. In 2005 she adapted her 1985 novel for adults, La Presència (transl. The Presence), for a theatrical production which was directed by her daughter Nona. The following year she wrote the play Càsting de fantasmes (transl. Casting Ghosts) which again was directed by her daughter Nona. The pair repeated the same collaboration to bring La rateta que escombrava l'escaleta (transl. The Rat that Swept the Stairs) to the stage in 2009 and again in 2010. Two years later they joined together again to bring Nana Bunilda menja malsons to the stage at the Mercat de les Flors during the Festival del Grec.

She also wrote several novels for adults in the first two decades of the twenty-first century and stated, in May 2023, that she was in the last stages of writing a novel for adults she had first conceived of in 1996.

== Writing style and themes ==
She called herself a painter in words and was highly collaborative in the way she worked with illustrators. She would first create notes and a story outline and hand that off to the artist. Once they had created the illustrations she would fill in the tale's details in a way that made the images integral to the work. She wrote in an era when authors picked up themes never written about before and had imperfect major characters like her La imbècil and El germá gran. Her works, especially those for children, do not shy away from harsh topics like suicide, abandonment, poverty and abuse. She has said that her experience growing up in a society suffocated under the Franco dictatorship caused her to mistrust adults and this is reflected in her work.

== Personal life ==
Company married Agustí Asensio i Saurí in 1972. They had two daughters, Gisela and Nona. Agustí died in a traffic accident in their Barcelona neighborhood in 1994. Nona Asensio i Company is a theatrical director. Gisela ran the Fundació Augustí Asensio.

== Awards and recognitions ==
Award and grantor	Year	Reason
Honors list; International Board on Books for Young People	2022	Contribution to Catalan literature for children and youth
Barcelona Medal of Honor; Barcelona City Council	1999	Career achievements
Inclusion in the White Ravens catalog; International Youth Library	1990	Fa olor de primavera (transl. It Smells Like Spring)
Inclusion in the White Ravens catalog; International Youth Library	1987	La Nana Bunilda menja malsons
Inclusion in the White Ravens catalog; International Youth Library	1987	La història de l'Ernest (transl. Earnest's Story)
Inclusion in the White Ravens catalog; International Youth Library	1987	La imbècil (transl. The Idiot)
Inclusion in the White Ravens catalog; International Youth Library	1985	El germà gran (transl. The Big Brother)
Prize for Catalan Literature; Catalonian Regional Government	1986	La història de l'Ernest
The Serra d'Or Critic's Award; Serra d'Or Magazine	1983	En Gil i el paraigua màgic (transl. Gil and the Magic Umbrella)
The Serra d'Or Critic's Award; Serra d'Or Magazine	1986	La Nana Bunilda menja malsons

== Body of work ==
Books for young children
YEAR	TITLE	VOLUMES; IN SERIES	ILLUSTRATOR	PUBLISHER	LANGUAGES
1973	Els contes de l'oncle Agus	Four	Augustí Asensio	Eurocromo, Barcelona	Catalan, Castellano and Italian
1981	El rei Taluk		Augustí Asensio	Gakken, Tokyo	
	L'Anna i en Víctor	Eight	Augustí Asensio	Editorial Bruguera, Barcelona	Catalan and Castellano
1982	Els dos+1	Six	Augustí Asensio	Timun Mas, Barcelona	Catalan and Castellano
	Kiko, el pollet		Augustí Asensio	Gakken Tokyo	
	Kilian i els Dracs		Augustí Asensio	Gakken Tokyo	
	En Gil i el Paraigua Màgic		Augustí Asensio	Publicacons Abadia Montserrat, Barcelona	Catalan and Galician
	El presoner del Gegant		Augustí Asensio	Hymsa, Barcelona	Catalan and Castellano
	Bamba, el rey gordo		Augustí Asensio	Alfaguara, Madrid	
1983	Les Tres Bessones	Nine	Roser Capdevila	Arín/Planeta, Barcelona	Catalan, Castellano
	La Bruxia Bufuruda		Francesc Rovira	Hymsa, Barcelona	
	Les peripècies d'en Quico		Francesc Rovira	Desano, Barcelona	
	La cuitat des estrelles		Valenana Cruz	Argos-Vergara, Barcelona	Catalan, Castellano, Basque, Galician
	Don Remigio el campanero		Augustí Asensio	Alfaguara, Madrid	
	La nit		Valenana Cruz	Argos-Vergara, Barcelona	Catalan, Castellano, Basque, Galician
1984	La petita fantasma	Ten	Augustí Asensio	Gakken, Tokyo	Japanese, German Danish, English, Mongolian
	Els birimboies	Seven	Augustí Asensio	Arin, Barcelona	Catalan, Castellano, German
	Les dents del lleó		Paula Rëzkiznová	Argos-Vergara, Barcelona	Catalan, Castellano, Basque and Galician
	Charlot		Violeta Denou	Hymsa, Barcelona	Catalan, Castellano
	La casa d'en Gatus		Montse Ginesta	La Galera	Catala, Castellano
	La llegenda de fran Garí		Valenana Cruz	Publicacons Abadia Montserrat, Barcelona	
	La nina de drap		Augustí Asensio	Gakken, Tokyo	Japanese, US English,
	Els ous			Diari AVUI	
	Quan an`avem a fer la ouija			Diari AVUI	
1985	La reina calba		Mercè Arànega	País Valencià	
	Nana Bunnilda menja Malsons		Augustí Asensio	Cruïlla, Barcelona	Castellano Orlando Florida Spanish, Danish, German, Flemish, Finnish and French
	L'home del blat		Augustí Asensio		
	En Guillem, l'escura-xemeneies		Augustí Asensio	Hymsa, Barcelona	Catalan, Castellano
	La petita estralla		Violeta Denou	Argos-Vergara, Barcelona	Catalan, Castellano, Basque and Galician
	Abans de tornar les claus			Diari AVUI	
1986	Aprèn màgia amb els birimboies	Five	Augustí Asensio	Arin, Barcelona	Catalan and Castellano
	El món de les coses perdudes		Mercè Arànega	Publicacons Abadia Montserrat, Barcelona	Catalan, Castellano
1987	Ángela Ratuca, mensajera exprés		Augustí Asensio		Castellano, Galician, Basque, German, French
	Gats Remullats		Augustí Asensio	Gakken, Tokyo	
1988	El SanM i la Nona	Ten	Horacio Elena	Edicions Timun Mas, Barcelona	Catalan, Castellano, Basque
	La colla peMta i el cangur	Four	Roser Capdevila	Barcelona	Catlan, Castellano, Italian
1989	Al cor del bosc	Five	Augustí Asensio	Edicions Timun Mas, Barcelona	Catalan, Castellano, Basque, French
	La granja dels arMstes	Four	Mercè Arànega	Edicions Timun Mas, Barcelona	Catalan, Castellano
	Fa olor de primavera		Augustí Asensio	Cruïlla, Barcelona	Castellano
	A les golfes (Quina por!)		Augustí Asensio	Parramon, Barcelona	
	A casa de la bruixa		Augustí Asensio	Gakken, tokyo	
1990	Els contes de la Nana Bunilda	Six	Augustí Asensio	Ediciones Cruïlla SM, Barcelona/Madrid	Catalan, Castellano, Korean, Flemish, Japanese, Portuguese, Turkish
	Calixte i el pessebre		Augustí Asensio	Ediciones Milan, Barcelona	
	¡Qué manzana más bonita!		Augustí Asensio	Editorial SM, Madrid	
1991	El drac vermell en acció	Three	José M. Lavarello	Ediciones Toray, Barcelona	Catalan, Castellano
	Benvingut a les olimpíades, Sant Jordi			Revista la Municipal, Barcelona	
	El gegant més alt		Joma	Ediciones Toray, Barcelona	Catalan, Castellano
	Siram, un dimoni entremaliat		Montse Tobella	Publicacons Abadia Montserrat, Barcelona	Catalan, Castellano
	Qui pot bufar?		Augustí Asensio	Gakken, Tokyo	
1992	Un tap ben posat		Augustí Asensio	Gakken Tokyo	
1993	Què sóc jo?		Augustí Asensio	Gakken Tokyo	
1994	Las vacaciones de puc		Augustí Asensio	Anaya, Madrid	Castellano
2000	El reis del mambo				
	¡Ay, que miedo las señoras!		Chata Lucini		

Books for preadolescents
YEAR	TITLE	ILLUSTRATOR	PUBLISHER	LANGUAGES
1984	La casa d'en Gatus	Montse Ginesta	La Galera SAU Editorial, Barcelona	
	Don Remigio el campanero	Agustí Asensio	Alfaguara, Barcelona	Castellano, French
1985	La reina calba	Mercè Arànega	Federació Enatats País Valencià, València	
	El germà gran	Francesc Rovira	La Galera, Barcelona	
	La història de l'Ernest	José María Lavarello	Editorial Cruïlla, Barcelona	Castellano, German, Brazilian Portuguese, Greek and Korean
	Una gàbia al menjador	Francesc Rovira	Teide, Barcelona	Catalan, Castellano
	Sota el llum d'un fanalet	Roser Rius		
	Cul de mal seient	José Maria Lavarello	Editorial Baula, Barcelona	
	Pegando brincos por ahí	Francesc Rovira	Grupo SM, Barcelona	Castellano, Basque, Galician
	Àxel, el mirall de TFR	Arnal Ballester	Edebé, Barcelona	Catalan, Castellano
	Una mentida llarga i grassona	José Maria Lavarello	Edicions del Bullent, València	
