= Canimals =

2011–2015 South Korean television series

- Also known as: Canimals: We Can Do It!
- Genre: Comedy; Slapstick
- Created by: Vooz Character System
- Written by: Stuart Kenworthy; Ian Carney; Tom Parkinson; James Henry
- Creative directors: Kim Yoo-kyung; Toni Garcia; Richard Starzak
- Voices of: Marie Fagundo; Todd Winters; Robert Pope; Sly Johnson; Martial Le Minoux; Jérémy Prévost
- Theme music composer: Simon Russell
- Composer: Simon Russell
- Countries of origin: South Korea; Spain; United Kingdom
- No. of seasons: 2
- No. of episodes: 109

Production
- Executive producers: Carlos Biern; Kim Yoo-kyung; Miles Bullough; Sun Kyung Jung
- Producers: Sarah Fell; Chey Lee; Robert Doherty; Jung Min Park; Han Gil Nam; Claudio Biern Boyd
- Running time: 5 minutes
- Production companies: Voozclub Co., Ltd. BRB Internacional; Screen 21; Cromosoma; Televisió de Catalunya; Aardman Animations

Original release
- Network: EBS (South Korea); ITV (CITV) (United Kingdom); Super 3 (Spain)
- Release: 2 March 2011 – present

Canimals (portmanteau of "can" and "animal") (Korean: 캐니멀, kaenimeol), also known as Canimals: We Can Do It!, is a live-action/animated television series by Voozclub Co., Ltd., BRB Internacional, Screen 21, Cromosoma, Televisió de Catalunya and Aardman Animations. The main characters are Mimi, Ato, Uly, Fizzy, Nia, Oz, Pow, Toki, and Leon. Internationally, the series has aired in South Korea through CITV and worldwide through ITV Network. In November 2022, a third season was announced to be in development.

== Plot ==
Canimals follows the adventures of a group of tiny creatures who discover the world around them while disguising in their tin cans whenever humans are around.

== Development ==
The character's creation began in 2006. At this time, the characters were visually different and lacked arms.

The voice acting was done by Aardman, while the modeling, animation, and sound processing were handled by VoozClub, Cromosoma and BRB International.

== Licensing ==
BRB International manages all the series' rights on the Iberian Peninsula.

Canimals was added to Netflix on 1 November 2015 before being removed on 15 June 2019. The series was streaming again in May 7, 2021.

Canal+ managed the series rights in France where it aired on Télétoon+.

== Characters ==
- Ato – A cheerful and adventurous Beagle in a green can.
- Oz – A clever Turkish Angora in a red can. She frequently gets herself into more trouble than she can manage, can get away with just about anything.
- Mimi – A sassy white dog in a pink can. She loves doing girly activities usually with the other female Canimals. However, she can also get annoyed easily and has a habit of smacking other Canimals out of the way with her ears.
- Nia – A timid and childlike Turkish Van in a yellow can. She is easily frightened and prone to tears, and can let out a deafening sonic scream.
- Uly – A hungry Pug in an orange can. He has a large appetite and will eat just about anything he sets his eyes on.
- Fizzy – A Siamese cat in a blue can. He aspires to live a ninja lifestyle, but everything he does has a tendency to backfire on him. He is quite clumsy and accident-prone. He has an interest in martial arts. He likes shiny objects such as rings. He is able to make clones of himself as seen in the episode Mimi's Birthday.

=== Other characters ===
- Pow – A Great horned owl in a light brown can. He can debilitate the other Canimals by shooting laser waves from his eyes.
- Leon – A Chameleon in a green and yellow can. He has the ability to turn invisible and use his tongue to grab objects or cling to higher places.
- Toki – A hyperactive and spontaneous Rabbit in a blue can similar to Fizzy's. He is chock full of energy and loves to hop and dance around, especially if there is music. He often uses his jumping to his advantage.
- Woo-ang – A Bull Terrier who's always happy-go-lucky.
- Peng and Gwin – A penguin twin brother and sister duo.
- Boco – A giant squirrel who is the leader of the Cocoboses. In the episode "Canned Nuts", he antagonizes Ato, Toki and Nia.
- Cocoboses – Small squirrels who love metal nuts and bolts.
- Wooga – A gorilla who doesn’t like dogs and other kinds of animals, except for cats. Wooga can have a serious temper at times.
- Koby – A turtle who doesn’t like spicy food. He is kind, grumpy, furious and happy. He gets nervous sometimes.
- Pip – A black and white cat who is Ato's friend for most of the time. She was nicknamed Mini Pip when Mimi and Nia cared for her. However, she can take on a giant form and antagonize the Canimals.
- Lion De Capri – A hot-tempered lion. He can roar very loudly and has chased the Canimals on one occasion.
- Olive – A unique brown skunk. She falls in love with a sock puppet and farts from the episode "Trash Can" in season 1.
- Moo – A grizzly bear who chased Ato, Toki and Nia in the episode "Canned Nuts" in season 1.
- Woong and Ung – A seal twin brother duo.
- Dama – A Dalmatian dog who has three younger relatives called the Dallies.
- Bebes are bats in cans.
- Elly – An elephant that loves bubbles and blows them with her trunk from the episode "Bubble Traveling" in season 2.

== Episodes ==
Season 1

No. overall	No. in series	Title	Directed by	Written by	Original release date
1	1	"Music of the Night"	Chey Lee	Ian Carney	10 October 2011
Toki's interest in listening to a human's MP3 player at night ends up disturbing Uly, Mimi and Leon's sleep.
2	2	"Pool Can"	Antony Gusscott	Alan Keane & Jesse Cleverly	11 October 2011
It's a hot day and Ato, Oz, Uly, Mimi and Toki get the idea of turning a kitchen sink into a swimming pool.
3	3	"Can vs. Shell"	Im Jun-suk	Soojin Choi & Jose L. Ucha	12 October 2011
Fizzy ends up having to battle a hermit crab for a shiny ring that he drops into a fish tank.
4	4	"Toki in Love"	Antony Gusscott	Ian Carney	13 October 2011
Toki falls in love with a can of carrots but Mimi wants to break them up ASAP.
5	5	"Uly and the Apple"	Im Jun-suk	Declan de Barra	14 October 2011
Uly and Pow fight for the right to an apple tree, though the apples have some unforeseen side effects on Uly...
6	6	"Paint Cans"	Antony Gusscott	Ian Carney, Richard Preddy, Mark Hodkinson, James Henry, and Stuart Kenworthy	15 October 2011
Mimi demands that Ato, Oz and Leon paint a picture of her, though their paintings turn out less than satisfactory...
7	7	"Super Can"	Chey Lee	Choi Soo-jin and Jose L. Ucha	16 October 2011
Fizzy tries his best to imitate a superhero he has seen on the television.
8	8	"Kiss and Make Up"	Antony Gusscott	Ian Carney, Richard Preddy, Mark Hodkinson, James Henry & Stuart Kenworthy	17 October 2011
Oz, Mimi and Nia hold a beauty pageant to see who can win a sweet trophy. Oz has a plan to beat Mimi so Oz use Uly to be her in disguise.
9	9	"Mistake Can ID"	Chey Lee	Alan Keane & Richard Starzak	18 October 2011
The choice is clear for Uly when he finds some money for a vending machine: a chocolate bar or a trapped Mimi?
10	10	"School Pet"	Chey Lee	Ian Carney, Mark Hodkinson, Stuart Kenworthy, Tom Parkinson & Andrew Lavery	19 October 2011
Nia makes friend with a gold fish, but Uly wants to eat it.
11	11	"Rocket Cans"	Jun Suc Lim	Soojin Choi & Jose L. Ucha	20 October 2011
When their ball is knocked out of reach by Ato and Toki use a soft drink can as a rocket to get it back.
12	12	"Snow Cans"	Chey Lee	Ian Carney, Mark Hodkinson, Stuart Kenworthy, Tom Parkinson & Andrew Lavery	21 October 2011
Ato, Oz and Uly are in the snow. Ato and Oz find a snow sledge and take it for a ride, but they also have to outride a snowball rolling their way.
13	13	"Can't Blame Me"	Antony Gusscott	Ian Carney, Mark Hodkinson, Stuart Kenworthy, Tom Parkinson & Andrew Lavery	22 October 2011
Mimi and Nia take in a new Canimal named Pip, but Pip wants to eat alive the pet bird, so Ato must find a solution to defeat him.
14	14	"Can Eats Can"	Chey Lee	Soojin Choi & Jose L. Ucha	23 October 2011
Leon had found a choc snack bar When Uly falls in love with a vending machine, but must contend with Leon in order to get at the treats inside.
15	15	"Canned Nuts"	Antony Gusscott	Ian Carney, Richard Preddy, Mark Hodkinson, James Henry & Stuart Kenworthy	24 October 2011
Ato, Toki and Nia stumble upon an urban complex, but Boco and his Cocobosses don't take kindly to their intrusion.
16	16	"Can Napper"	Chey Lee	Soojin Choi & Jose L. Ucha	25 October 2011
Mimi and a male Bull Terrier named Wooang race across the city to rescue Uly, who has gotten himself trapped in a suitcase.
17	17	"Sleeprolling Can"	Chey Lee	Soojin Choi & Jose L. Ucha	26 October 2011
When Ato, Uly, Mimi and Leon were asleep. Poor Nia has her work cut out when she has to prevent a sleepwalking Mimi from getting hurt or worse still, being discovered by humans...
18	18	"Wasp"	Chey Lee	Ian Carney, Richard Preddy, Mark Hodkinson, James Henry & Stuart Kenworthy	27 October 2011
Pow ends up getting stung when he angers a swarm of wasps.
19	19	"Baby Doll"	Chey Lee	Ian Carney, Richard Preddy, Mark Hodkinson, James Henry & Stuart Kenworthy	28 October 2011
Mimi and Nia try to return a baby doll to its stroller.
20	20	"Canimalism"	Antony Gusscott	Ian Carney, Mark Hodkinson, Stuart Kenworthy, Tom Parkinson & Andrew Lavery	29 October 2011
Mimi, Toki and Leon end up running for their lives when Uly views them as food.
21	21	"Encanted"	Antony Gusscott	Soojin Choi & Jose L. Ucha	30 October 2011
Toki and Nia stumble across a magician's magic set, which has some unforeseen effects on Nia...
22	22	"Egg roll"	Chey Lee	Ian Carney, Mark Hodkinson, Stuart Kenworthy, Tom Parkinson & Andrew Lavery	31 October 2011
With Pow and Leon, you get egg roll; that is, Pow wants to hatch an egg but Leon also wants to eat it...
23	23	"Shiny Cans"	Jun Suc Lim	Alan Keane & Jesse Cleverly	1 November 2011
Excluded from playing with Mimi and Nia, Oz uses Uly to steal the kitchen equipment the girls play with.
24	24	"Dolly Disaster"	Chey Lee	Ian Carney, Mark Hodkinson, Stuart Kenworthy, Tom Parkinson & Andrew Lavery	2 November 2011
Nia won't calm down when a doll she likes gets stuck on top of the light, so Ato and Oz try to get it back.
25	25	"Can of the Castle"	Jun Suc Lim	Ian Carney, Mark Hodkinson, Stuart Kenworthy, Tom Parkinson & Andrew Lavery	3 November 2011
Mimi ends up fighting back to reclaim a sandcastle that has been taken over by Oz and Uly.
26	26	"Doppelcanner"	Hyun Joo Lee	Alan Keane	4 November 2011
Leon bullied out of his share of cereal comes up with a plan to 'masquerade' as Uly and Mimi is bad enough, what happens when there are two them?
27	27	"Ants and Cans"	Chey Lee	Soojin Choi & Jose L. Ucha	5 November 2011
Uly, Fizzy and Toki end up on the wrong side of a colony of ants that they keep taking food from.
28	28	"Vase"	Jun Suc Lim	James Henry	6 November 2011
Uly, Pow, Toki and Leon end up stuck in a glass vase when they fight over Nia's lollipop.
29	29	"Can-oodling"	Antony Gusscott	Mark Hodkinson	7 November 2011
Mimi becomes smitten over a doll of a groom.
30	30	"Candid Camera"	Jun Suc Lim	Ian Carney, Richard Preddy, Mark Hodkinson, James Henry & Stuart Kenworthy	8 November 2011
Nia becomes convinced that Uly is trapped inside a camera.
31	31	"Leave Me a Gnome"	Antony Gusscott	Ian Carney, Mark Hodkinson, Stuart Kenworthy, Tom Parkinson & Andrew Lavery	9 November 2011
Oz and Leon plays a prank on Mimi and Nia involving garden gnomes.
32	32	"Can-ouflage"	Chey Lee	Ian Carney, Mark Hodkinson, Stuart Kenworthy, Tom Parkinson & Andrew Lavery	10 November 2011
Fizzy will try to do anything to get a piece of a muffin Mimi finds, even if it means disguising himself...
33	33	"Bully Cans"	Antony Gusscott	Alan Keane	11 November 2011
Bullied by Oz and Toki, Nia snaps and mans a remote-controlled robot to terrorize them.
34	34	"Trapped Can"	Jun Suc Lim	Soojin Choi & Jose L. Ucha	12 November 2011
Uly becomes stuck in a teacup and Ato, Mimi, Toki and Leon have to free him before someone discovers.
35	35	"Once Upon a Can"	Chey Lee	Alan Keane	13 November 2011
Ato, Uly, Mimi, Pow and Fizzy were a sleep. While a mother reads Rapunzel to her daughter, Mimi dreams about getting the kiss of a prince.
36	36	"Can Can Fly"	Jun Suc Lim	Soojin Choi & Jose L. Ucha	14 November 2011
Toki hops about with some balloons but inadvertently gets Uly and Mimi tied up in the string...
37	37	"Skater Can"	Antony Gusscott	Ian Carney, Mark Hodkinson, Stuart Kenworthy, Tom Parkinson & Andrew Lavery	15 November 2011
Ato, Oz, Uly and Leon discover an abandoned roller-skate, they decide to ride about on it for fun. Oz decides she wants to have the skate all for herself.
38	38	"Heavy Jelly"	Jun Suc Lim	Ian Carney, Mark Hodkinson, Stuart Kenworthy, Tom Parkinson & Andrew Lavery	16 November 2011
Toki gets himself trapped in a bowl of blue-colored jelly when it sets, so Uly, Mimi and Nia try to free him before he is humiliated.
39	39	"Chili Can Carnage"	Antony Gusscott	Ian Carney, Mark Hodkinson, Stuart Kenworthy, Tom Parkinson & Andrew Lavery	17 November 2011
Oz, Fizzy, Wooang and a male turtle canimal named Koby discover some cold leftovers and fiery chilies. Oz feeds the chilies to Koby things begin to heat up.
40	40	"Trash Can"	Antony Gusscott	Ian Carney, Mark Hodkinson, Stuart Kenworthy, Tom Parkinson & Andrew Lavery	18 November 2011
Ato has a cold and makes friends with a smelly sock puppet. Mimi and Fizzy do all they can to break this stinky relationship between the two up
41	41	"Can Zilla"	Jun Suc Lim	Alan Keane	19 November 2011
One of Oz's pranks, involving some glue, goes haywire when Pow, Toki, Nia, and Leon get stuck together.
42	42	"Moustak Can"	Chey Lee	Ian Carney, Mark Hodkinson, Stuart Kenworthy, Tom Parkinson & Andrew Lavery	20 November 2011
Ato, Uly and Toki find themselves dealing with many mousetraps.
43	43	"Mama Can"	Jun Suc Lim	Soojin Choi & Jose L. Ucha	21 November 2011
Oz, Mimi, Pow, Toki, Peng, Gwen and Capri all mistake a cake for their various love interests...
44	44	"Classroom"	Won Cheol Lee	Heena Baek	22 November 2011
Ato, Oz, Uly, Mimi, Fizzy and Nia play about in a classroom and Ato, Oz, Mimi and Nia meet a goldfish that does almost anything they do.
45	45	"Coffee Cans"	Jun Suc Lim	Ian Carney, Richard Preddy, Mark Hodkinson, James Henry & Stuart Kenworthy	23 November 2011
Outside on a cold day Mimi, Pow, Fizzy and Leon discover a half-filled cup of coffee radiating warmth. Mimi wants it all to herself and has to outwit the others.
46	46	"Can Flew Over the Cuckoo's Nest"	Jun Suc Lim	Soojin Choi & Jose L. Ucha	24 November 2011
Pow falls in love with the cuckoo of a cuckoo clock, a relationship that Leon won't take seriously.
47	47	"Wild Can"	Won Cheol Lee & Antony Gusscott	Heena Baek	25 November 2011
Capri gives chase to Ato, Oz and Nia around a garden.
48	48	"Mimi's Birthday"	Jun Suc Lim	Ian Carney, Mark Hodkinson, Stuart Kenworthy, Tom Parkinson & Andrew Lavery	26 November 2011
Mimi desperately tries to defend a birthday cake from Uly, Fizzy and Leon thinking it is hers alone.
49	49	"Vacuum Can"	Antony Gusscott	Richard Preddy	27 November 2011
Uly, Fizzy and Leon get in a tussle with a vacuum and Uly eventually has to be rescued from it. Wooang and Capri are in the vacuum
50	50	"King Can"	Chey Lee	Alan Keane & Jesse Cleverly	28 November 2011
In a warehouse, Uly, Mimi and Nia discover a gorilla Canimal named Wooga, who abducts Nia.
51	51	"Canimal Magnetism"	Jun Suc Lim	Ian Carney, Mark Hodkinson, Stuart Kenworthy, Tom Parkinson & Andrew Lavery	29 November 2011
A simple prank by Leon involving fridge magnets goes awry when Ato becomes increasingly attractive to the kitchen utensils.
52	52	"Florence Nighting Can"	Antony Gusscott	Alan Keane	30 November 2011
Mimi and Nia get the idea of playing doctors and nurses, but Uly, Toki and Leon aren't willing to receive treatment...
53	53	"Can Race"	Jun Suc Lim	TBD	TBD
Where are the keys? Let's watch Ato, Oz and Toki do with the keys!
54	54	"Frozen Can"	Jun Suc Lim	TBD	TBD
What kind of canimals lives in the fridge? Starved Uly went inside the fridge this time. Uly meet a Peng and Gwen inside of the fridge. What's going to happen to Uly?
55	55	"Fly to the Sky"	Jun Suc Lim	TBD	TBD
Who wants to go on an adventure? Ato, Oz and Mimi are ready for it! Let's hop on their rides!
56	56	"Scared Can"	TBD	TBD	TBD
Nia was left alone in a room full of Halloween items. Pow help Nia to face her fears. Is Nia going to have a nightmare tonight?
57	57	"Cans 'n' Socks"	TBD	TBD	TBD
Ato, Oz, Uly, Mimi, Fizzy and Nia are getting their stockings ready for gifts on Christmas.

== Reception ==
=== Viewership ===
In South Korea, Canimals premiered broadcast on EBS in 2011. It received a high viewership rating and was well-received throughout the country. In Spain, two seasons aired on SX3 on 2 July 2012.

In the United Kingdom, Canimals achieved a peak viewership of around 153,800 viewers on 4 February 2013 during the after school block. It quickly became one of CITV's flagship shows, delivering the second highest average audience viewing figures against competitors in the afternoons. Canimals also delivered the highest average audience viewing figures against competitors in the mornings.

== Awards and nominations ==
Canimals won as the best for kids 7–10 at the 2010 Kids' Jury and nominated for the Licensing Challenge in MIPJR 2010. The series also was ranked second among more than 1,000 works at MIPCOM Junior 2009 where It won the best animation award. In 2011, it won the Grand Prize President Award at the Korean Content Awards.
