= Institut Guttmann =

Neurorehabilitation hospital in Barcelona, Spain

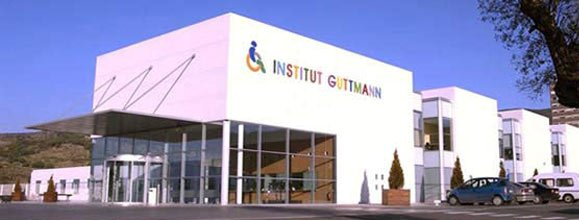

Geography
- Location: Barcelona, Spain

Organisation
- Care system: Public
- Type: Specialist
- Patron: Guillermo González Gilbey

Services
- Beds: 152
- Speciality: Nervous system

History
- Founded: 27 November 1965

Links
- Website: http://https//www.guttmann.com/es
- Lists: Hospitals in Spain

Institut Guttmann is a neurorehabilitation hospital, which was opened on 27 November 1965 in Barcelona. It was the first hospital in Spain dedicated to the rehabilitation of people with spinal cord injuries, introducing some of the techniques developed by Ludwig Guttmann a few years earlier into the country.

Its first medical director was Dr. Miguel Sarrias Domingo, who was a student both of Josep Trueta in Oxford and Ludwig Guttmann in Stoke Mandeville.

It has been situated in Badalona since 2002, and is a reference hospital for medical-surgical treatment and rehabilitation of people affected by spinal cord injuries as well as people with brain damage and other disabilities with a neurological origin.

The Institut Guttmann Foundation, named after the hospital, was founded in 1962 by Guillermo González Gilbey, who, after experiencing paraplegia following a traffic accident in 1958, was treated in Stoke Mandeville Hospital by Dr Guttmann. Upon his return to Catalonia, he decided to promote the new hospital, along with other people.

In 1995, the hospital was awarded the Creu de Sant Jordi and in 2001 it received the Plaza Josep Trueta award. In 2015, to coincide with the 50th anniversary of its inauguration, it was awarded the Medalla d'Honor del Parlament de Catalunya.
