= Ara (newspaper) =

Catalan daily newspaper

- Type: Daily newspaper
- Founded: 28 November 2010
- Political alignment: Catalanism; Centrism; Catalan right of self-determination
- Language: Catalan
- Headquarters: Barcelona
- ISSN: 2014-010X
- Website: ara.cat/en

Ara (Catalan pronunciation: [ˈaɾə], meaning Now in English) is a Catalan daily Spanish newspaper that began publication on 28 November 2010, coinciding with the 2010 Catalan regional election. It is the third most read daily newspaper in Catalonia, and the most read daily newspaper written exclusively in the Catalan language. Its regional edition, Ara Balears, is the most popular Catalan language newspaper on the Balearic Islands. ARA's online edition had nearly 3.2M visitors in September 2017, making it the most popular online newspaper in Catalan language.

The founding editor was Carles Capdevila and the current editor is Esther Vera. The president is Ferran Rodés and the CEO is Salvador Garcia. The newspaper's advisory council includes journalists Antoni Bassas, Albert Om and Toni Soler, all known for their work with the Catalan public TV broadcaster, TV3. Ara's content includes Catalan translations of reports and articles from the New York Times International Edition.

Ara's founding shareholders were, among others, Ferran Rodés, Fundació Carulla, Víctor Font and the group Cultura 03, which also publishes magazines Sàpiens, TimeOut Barcelona, Descobrir and Cuina. Cultura 03 is no longer a shareholder. In September 2010, Antoni Bassas announced that he would participate as a shareholder.

== History and profile ==
The first issue of Ara came out on 28 November 2010, selling out all 120,000 print copies.

Ara, as 2017, has 40.000 subscribers. Subscriptions are Ara's main source of income (41 per cent), having surpassed advertising revenue in 2015. Revenue from readers is also 2.5 times more significant than income from newsstand sales.

In 2017 ARA grew by 10 per cent and was the only newspaper based in Barcelona or Madrid that managed to grow at all. In March 2018 its readership rose to 129K readers, which represents a 57.3 per cent growth, year-on-year.

Ara has received multiple awards including :

- 2013 – Premi Nacional de Comunicació (Premi Nacional de Mitjans d’arrel digital category )
- 2015 – European Newspaper Award, in the regional newspaper category
- 2015 – Ciutat de Barcelona award, in Media category, for Carles Capdevila, with a reference on his role as one of ARA's founders
- 2016 – Premi Nacional de Comunicació award for Carles Capdevila, with a reference on his role as one of ARA's founders
- 2017 – 11 awards in the 19th edition of the European Newspaper Awards, three of which for innovation, thanks to the special issues where drawings or works of art were used instead of photographs.
- 2017 – ARA received three ÑH newspaper design prizes (awarded by the Society for News Design) for its online reporting work.

== Editorial policy and political alignment ==
Ara's editorial policies are not considered to be supportive of any particular party or specific political ideology. Hence, the newspaper is generally considered as centrist regarding the left-right divide and strongly Catalanist regarding the issue of relations between Spain and Catalonia. Ara aims to cater to the community of socially committed, politically concerned and culturally active citizens.

== Expansion ==
The newspaper is printed in Barcelona and distributed throughout Catalonia. Since 2011, distribution was launched also on the Balearic Islands, soon becoming the most widely-read newspaper in Catalan language in the region. In February 2012, distribution was extended to some areas of the Valencian Community, especially in the Province of Castelló and in the city of Valencia.

Ara offers selected news items in English and Spanish.
