= Gold Medal of the Generalitat of Catalonia =

Award for achievement in advancing the cultural heritage of Catalonia

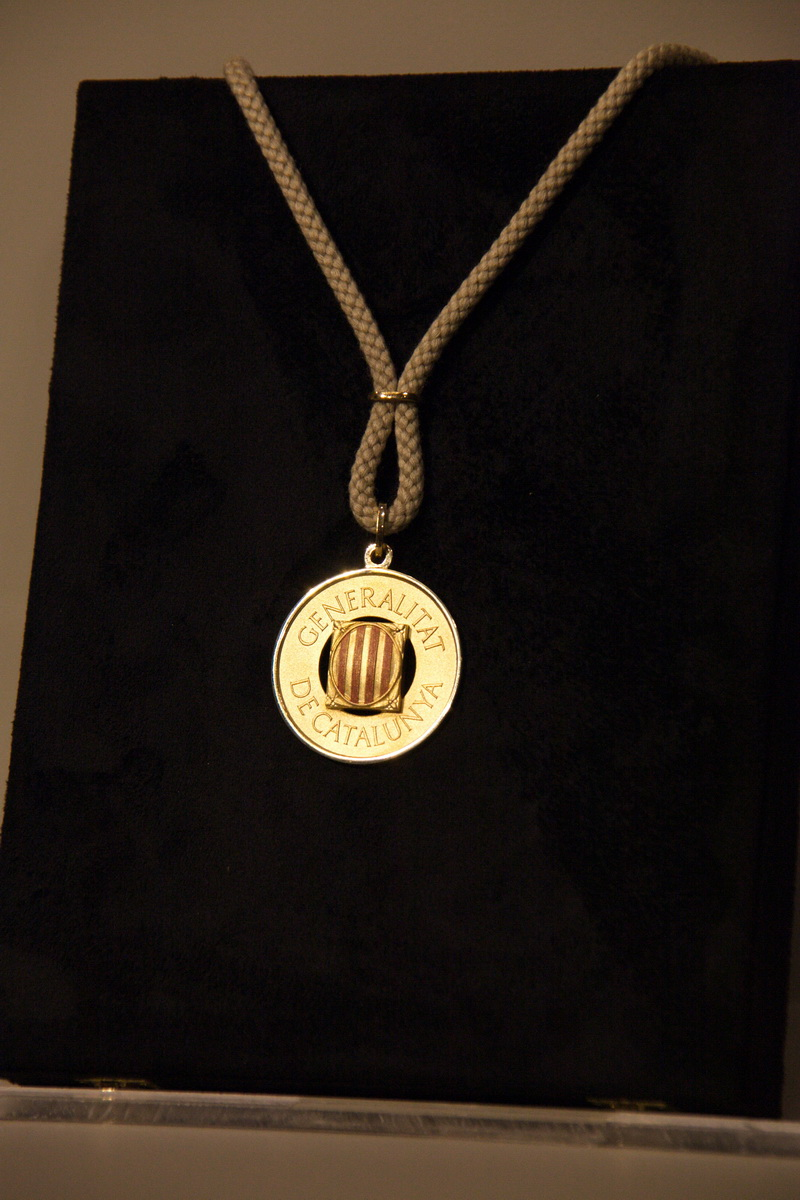
Gold Medal of the Generalitat of Catalonia

The gold medal of the Generalitat of Catalonia (Catalan: Medalla d'Or de la Generalitat de Catalunya) is the highest award given by the Generalitat of Catalonia to those people or institutions who have excelled with their work in the political, social, economic, cultural or scientific, and raised awareness of Catalan cultural heritage. Together with the Creu de Sant Jordi, Premi Internacional Catalunya and Medalla d'Honor del Parlament de Catalunya it is one of the highest civil awards in Catalonia.

== List of awarded ==
Year	Awarded	Category
1978	Joan Miró i Ferrà	Painting
1979	Pablo Casals	Music
1980	Joan Coromines i Vigneaux	Linguistics
"	Josep Pla i Casadevall	Literature
"	Jordi Rubió i Balaguer	Literature, filology bibliology
"	Salvador Espriu i Castelló	Literature
"	Frederic Mompou i Dencausse	Music
1981	Joan Rebull Torroja	Sculpture
"	Josep Vicenç Foix i Mas	Literature
"	Josep Lluís Sert i López	Architecture
"	Salvador Dalí i Domènech	Painting
1982	Montserrat Caballé i Folch	Music
"	Victòria dels Àngels López i Garcia	Music
"	Apel·les Fenosa i Florensa	Sculpture
1983	Joan Fuster i Ortells	Literature
"	Francesc de Borja Moll i Casasnovas	Literature and filology
"	Antoni Tàpies i Puig	Painting
"	Alícia de Larrocha i de la Calle	Music
1984	Josep Carreras i Coll	Music
"	Antoni Clavé i Sanmartí	Painting
1985	Joan Antoni Samaranch i Torelló	Sport
"	Miquel Batllori i Munné	Religion and Music
1986	Frederic Marès i Deulovol	Sculpture, pedagogy and history
1987	Not awarded	-
1988	Federico Mayor Zaragoza	Politics
"	Raimon Noguera i de Guzman	
"	Joan Sardà i Dexeus	Economics
"	Miquel Coll i Alentorn	Politics
1989	Not awarded	-
1990	Ramon Aramon i Serra	Literature and filology
1991	Narcís Jubany i Arnau	Religion
1992	Not awarded	-
1993	Ramon Roca i Puig	Religion
1994	Not awarded	-
1995	Not awarded	-
1996	Not awarded	-
1997	Jaume Aragall i Garriga	Music
"	Raimon Pelegero i Sanchís	Músic
"	Abadia de Montserrat	Religion
1998	Not awarded	-
1999	Miquel Martí i Pol	Literature
"	Xavier Montsalvatge i Bassols	Músic
2000	Pierre Vilar	History
"	Josep Benet i Morell	Literature
2001	Joan Triadú i Font	Literature
"	Hospital de la Santa Creu i Sant Pau	Health
"	Jordi Carbonell	Filology and politics
2002	Not awarded	-
2003	Josep Maria Castellet i Díaz de Cossío	Literature
"	Francesc Candel Tortajada	Literature
"	Ramon Margalef i López	Science and ecology
"	Joaquim Molas i Batllori	Literature
"	Antoni Pladevall i Font	Literature
2004	Joan Oró i Florensa	Science
2005	Gregorio López-Raimundo	Polítics
"	Joan Reventós	Polítics
"	La Caixa	Economics
2006	Antoni Gutiérrez Díaz	Polítics
2007	Jordi Pujol	Polítics
"	Pasqual Maragall	Polítics
2008	Moisès Broggi i Vallès	Health
"	Montserrat Carulla i Ventura	Arts
2009	Poble mexicà	Home of the Catalan exile during Spanish Civil War
"	Cos de Bombers de la Generalitat de Catalunya	Public service
2010	Jordi Solé i Tura	Politics (posthumous)
"	Institut d'Estudis Catalans	Investigation in the field of Catalan culture
"	Poblet Monastery	Historic and cultural
2011	Heribert Barrera	Politics (posthumous)
2012	Josep Maria Ainaud de Lasarte	Art history
2012	Antoni Maria Badia i Margarit	Linguistics
2013	Lluís Martínez Sistach	Cardinals
2013	Max Cahner i Garcia	Filology and politics (posthumous)
2013	Oriol Bohigas i Guardiola	Architecture
2014	Jordi Savall i Bernadet	Music
2015	Neus Català i Pallejà	
2015	Josep Maria Espinàs i Massip	Literature
2015	Joan Rodés i Teixidor	Health
2016	Muriel Casals i Couturier	Economy
2018	Carme Forcadell i Lluís	
2018	Carles Viver i Pi-Sunyer	
2018	RCR Arquitectes	
2019	Anna Cabré i Pla	
2019	Josep Vallverdú i Aixelà	
2020	Lluís Llach	
2020	Teresa Codina	
2021	Josefina Castellví	
2021	Arcadi Oliveres	
2022	Roser Capdevila	
2022	Antoni Vila Casas	
