= Cromosoma =

Spanish animation studio

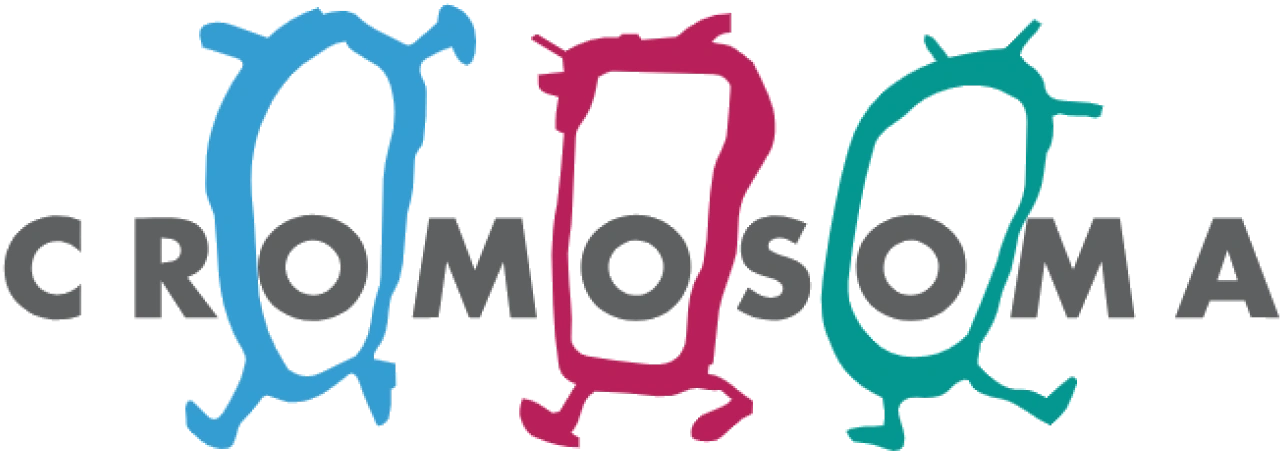
- Industry: Animation
- Founded: 1988; 38 years ago
- Founders: Oriol Ivern Ibáñez; Eulàlia Cirera
- Headquarters: Barcelona, Catalonia, Spain

Cromosoma (Spanish and Catalan for chromosome) was a Spanish animation studio and audiovisual producer, based in Barcelona. Founded in 1988 by Oriol Ivern, it produced works such as the children's series The Triplets and the feature films Wrinkles and Bicicleta, cuchara, manzana.

== Historia ==
Cromosoma was founded in 1988 by a group of investors led by audiovisual producer Oriol Ivern. In its early years it produced exclusively content in the Catalan language, such as the game show La caixa sávia (The Wise Box, for TV3, 1990) and the children's series Los cuentos de Nana Bunilda (TVE Cataluña, 1991).

In 1991, illustrator Roser Capdevila convinced Ivern to created an animated series based on her children's book series The Triplets, premiering in 1995 on TV3 in Catalonia, and later on Canal+ y La 2 in the rest of Spain. The Triplets became the largest international success for both Cromosoma and Televisió de Catalunya, as it aired in over 150 countries.

With the success of The Triplets, Cromosoma became an animation studio, producing series such as The Bored Witch (1999), Juanito Jones (2001), Miniman (2001), Tom (2004) and Asha (2010), as well as numerous derived products from its flagship franchise. In 2001, it began exploring the theatrical sector by starting production of a Triplets movie with the budget of 1.8 billion pesetas, for a three-year development window. In 2003, an animated short featuring The Triplets played at the 9pm watershed on Telecinco and some FORTA channels during the 2003-2004 school year.

Cromosoma's revenues fell as a consequence of the 2008 financial crisis, but the company had two highlighted works in the early 2010s: the movie Arrugas (Paco Roca, 2011), based on comic of the same name, and the documentary Bicicleta, cuchara, manzana (Carles Bosch, 2012), which was an overview into Pasqual Maragall's fight against Alzheimer's. Both won Goya Awards, respectively for Best Animated Film y Best Documentary.

After Oriol Ivern's premature death in 2012, the founder's heirs could not face the mounting debts and declared administration. Cromosoma finally closed in January 2013, putting the rights to its intellectual properties for sale.

== Productions ==
- The Triplets (1994, animated series). Produced by Cromosoma. Directed by Jordi Valbuena.Series based on drawings and stories created in 1983 by Roser Capdevila on his daughters, aimed at a 4-10 demographic. In each episode, one of the triplets does something bad and, as punishment, the Bored Witch sends them to a fairy tale, a classic story or in the past, in order to live adventures alongside famous historical characters.
- Les Magilletres (1997, animated series). Produced by Cromosoma, Full Animation, Roser Burgués Ventura, Televisió de Catalunya. Directed by David Cid, Baltasar Pedrosa Clavero. Series aimed at children with the aim of knowing all letters of the alphabet, enabling their introduction to reading and writing. Created in the wake of a lack of preschool content on Spanish television.
- Pimpa (1998, animated series). Produced by Cromosoma, France 3 (France), Quipos (Italy), RAI Fiction (Italy), Storimages (France). Directed by Enzo d'Alò. A dog who behaves like a girl has adventures with other animals and objects.
- Pipsqueak Plays Sport (2000, animated series). Produced by Cromosoma. Directed by Jordi Muray. Shows a wide variety of sports to children.
- Juanito Jones (2001, animated series). Produced by Cromosoma, Megatrix, Your Family Entertainment AG (Germany). Directed by Baltasar Pedrosa. Teaches children how to solve daily problems without violent methods and relying on his intelligence. The main character's mother is Mexican and his father, African. It was well received in the Latin American market.
- Miniman (2001, animated series). Produced by Cromosoma. Directed by Baltasar Pedrosa. A child alien superhero raised by bugs, teaches the youngest humans how to solve their problems.
- Motel Spaghetti (2001, animated series). Produced by Cromosoma. Directed by Fernando de Felipe. A group of young people live ordinary experiences.
- The Triplets and Gaudí (2002, animated film). Produced by Cromosoma. Directed by Jordi Valbuena, Ernest Agulló. The Triplets help Gaudí recover his creative enthusiasm.
- Asha, la filla del Ganges (2003, television documentary). Produced by Orbita Max, Cromosoma, Pontas Films, Televisió de Catalunya. Directed by Jordi Llompart. Inspired by Asha Miró's experiences when she was adopted by a Catalan family and returns to the land where she was born.
- Els contes contats de les tres bessones (2005, animated series). Produced by Cromosoma and Televisió de Catalunya. Directed by Toni Hernández. The tales of the Triplets told in English.
- The Triplets and the Riddle of Quixote (2005, animated film). Produced by Cromosoma and Televisió de Catalunya. Directed by Maria Gol, Jordi Valbuena. The Triplets must find a missing chapter of Don Quixote.
- The Baby Triplets (2006, the animated series). Produced by Cromosoma and Televisió de Catalunya. Directed by Jordi Muray, Maria Gol. Spin-off of The Triplets, as kindergarteners living daily life.
- Tom (2006, animated series). Produced by Cromosoma, EBU (Switzerland), Norma Editorial, Televisión Española - TVE. Directed by Ernest Agulló. A dinosaur travels around the world to help humans.
- Asha (2008, animated series). Produced by Cromosoma (most work), Fundació Jaume Bofill, Pontas Films (funding), Televisió de Catalunya (funding), Televisión Española - TVE (funding). Directed by Jordi Muray. A group of friends lives adventures.
- Sweestersː virtual room (2008, animated series). Produced by Eddadesign, Cromosoma and Televisió de Catalunya. Directed by Carles Salas and Daniel González. Three sisters talk at an online chat and don't dare to talk about them with each other.
- La nit que va morir l'Elvis (2009, feature film). Produced by Enunai Produccions (most work), Cromosoma (associate) and Televisió de Catalunya (associate). Directed by Oriol Ferrer. A solitary man dedicates himself to trying new things, but his life changes when an urbanization is being built in Montserrat.
- Revolución, toma 2, retorno a los escenarios (2009, television documentary). Produced by Cromosoma (most work), Televisió de Catalunya, Česká Televize (Czech Republic, most work). Directed by Carles Bosch. Carles Bosch travels to the Czech Republic to see if the Velvet Revolution was worth it.
- ¡Bravaǃ Victoria (2010, television documentary). Produced by Cromosoma (most work), Televisió de Catalunya (minor work). Directed by María Gorgues. A portrait of Barcelona soprano Victòria dels Àngels, who died in 2005.
- Bicicleta, cuchara, manzana (2010, feature-length documentary). Produced by Cromosoma (most work), Televisió de Catalunya (associate), XTVL Xarxa de Televisions Locals, Televisión Española - TVE. Directed by Carles Bosch. Documentary on Alzheimer's disease with Pasqual Maragall as its key element.
- Caracremada (2010, feature film). Produced by Mallerich Films Paco Poch (most work), Associació cultural Passos Llargs (associate), Cromosoma (minor work). Directed by Lluís Galter. Reflection on resistance to Franco's regime through the last warrior in action, Ramon Vila.
- El Papus, anatomia d'un atemptat (2010, television documentary). Produced by Cromosoma. Directed by David Fernández de Castro. Documentary on the satirical magazine which suffered from an attack.
- Miquel Batllori, la agudeza de un sabio (2010, television documentary). Produced by Cromosoma, Caixach Audiovisual and Televisió de Catalunya. Directed by Francesc Llobet. Documentary on a defender of Catalan language and culture.
- Wrinkles (2011, animated film). Produced by Cromosoma, Perro Verde Films and Televisión de Galicia. Directed by Ignacio Ferreras. Two old man try to live their last days alive with humor.
- Bajarí (2012, documentary film). Produced by Lastor Media, Cromosoma and Televisió de Catalunya. Directed by Eva Vila. Documentary on young flamenco and rumba talents.
