= Antoni Gutiérrez Díaz =

Catalan politician and physician (1929–2006)

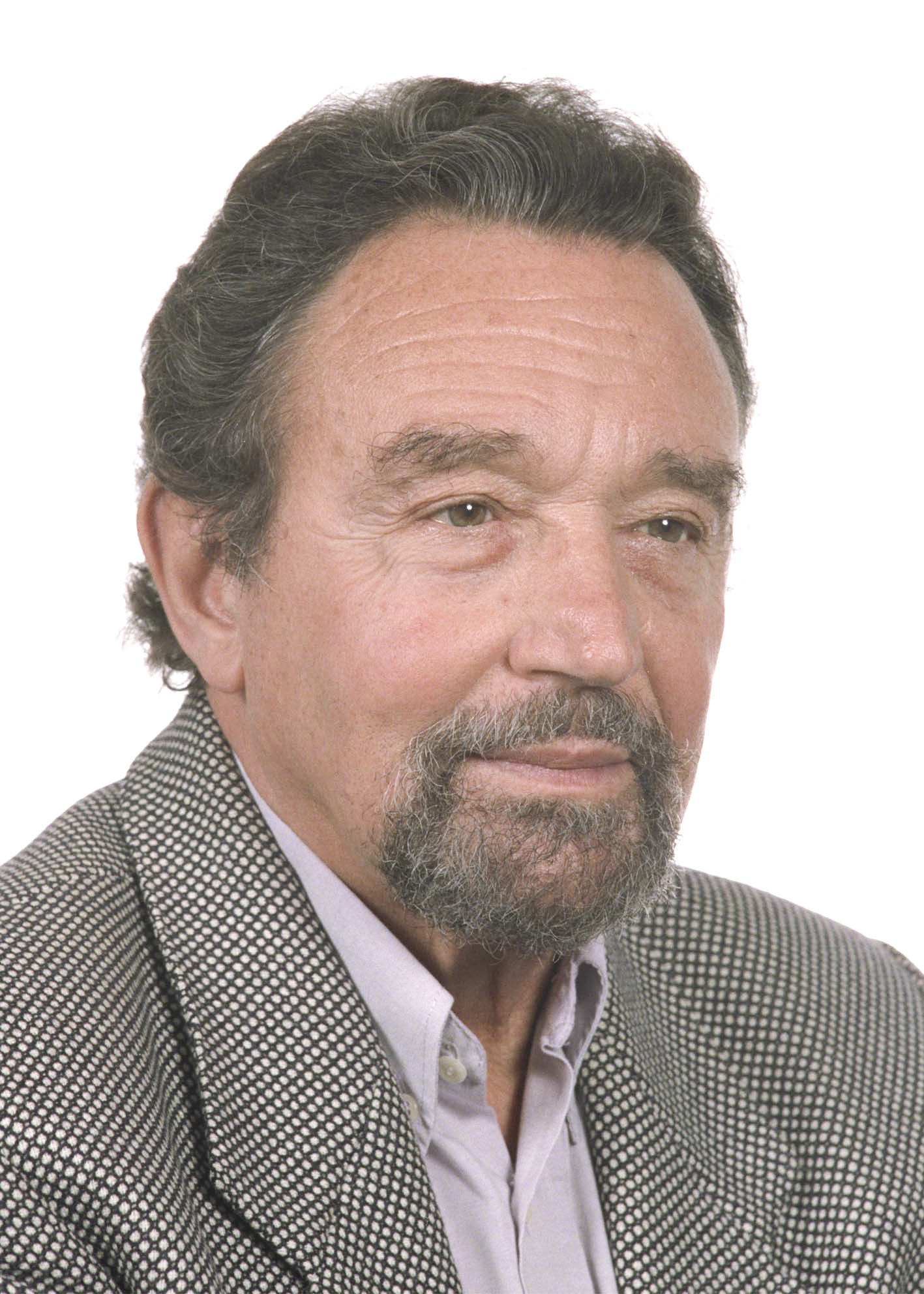
- Gutiérrez Díaz in 1994

Member of the European Parliament for Spain
- In office 10 June 1987 – 20 July 1999

Personal details
- Born: 19 January 1929 Premià de Mar, Spain
- Died: 6 October 2006 (aged 77) Terrassa, Spain
- Party: Unified Socialist Party of Catalonia; Initiative for Catalonia Greens
- Occupation: Physician

Antoni Gutiérrez Díaz (19 January 1929 – 6 October 2006) was a Catalan physician and communist politician who held various posts. He is also known as El Guti.

== Early life and education ==
Gutiérrez was born in Premià de Mar on 19 January 1929. His parents were originally from Málaga and settled in Premià de Mar. His father was an anarcho-syndicalist activist and was arrested in 1934.

Gutiérrez received a degree in medicine in Barcelona in 1953 and had further training in neonatology in Finland. He was among the anti-Franco activists during his youth.

== Career and activities ==
Following his graduation Gutiérrez worked as a physician in Barcelona. He became a member of the Unified Socialist Party of Catalonia (PSUC) in 1959. He was arrested in December 1962 and detained in Burgos prison for eight years. After his release he maintained his activities in secret due to the declaration of a state of emergency in 1969. He was again arrested in October 1973.

Gutiérrez was a deputy of the Spanish Parliament between 1977 and 1978. He was appointed minister without portfolio in the provisional government of Catalonia in 1977 and held the post until 1980. Then he was elected to the Catalan Parliament and served there from 1980 to 1987. He was the secretary general of the PSUC for two terms: between 1977 and 1981 and between 1982 and 1986. He left the PSUC in 1986 and involved in the establishment of a new political party entitled Initiative for Catalonia Greens.

Next Gutiérrez was elected to the European Parliament in 1987 and continued to serve there until 1999. During his tenure at the European Parliament he was part of the Initiative for Catalonia Greens. He served as the vice president of the European Parliament between 1994 and 1999.

=== Views ===
From the 1950s Gutiérrez was one of the supporters of the Italian Communist Party which promoted a new version of communism in line with the Gramsci's view. He was not a pro-Soviet communist and was an adherent of eurocommunism. After leaving PSUC he adopted an eco-socialist view becoming a member of the Initiative for Catalonia Greens.

== Personal life and death ==
Gutiérrez was married and had three children.

During a visit in Santiago de Compostela Gutiérrez was admitted to a hospital due to heart failure on 29 September 2006. He had been in coma when he was transferred to the Mutua Hospital in Terrassa where he died on 6 October 2006.

=== Awards and legacy ===
Gutiérrez was a recipient of the Gold Medal of the Generalitat of Catalonia in 2006.

There are many memorials for Gutiérrez in Barcelona. In 2020 Txema Castiella published a book about him entitled El Guti. L’optimisme de la voluntat ISBN 978-84-297-7860-1.
