= Miguel Sarrias Domingo =

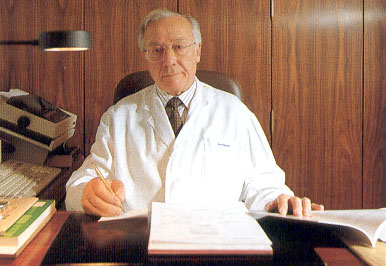
- Born: 19 January 1930; Barcelona, Spain
- Died: 2002
- Education: University of Barcelona (MD)
- Occupations: Orthopedic surgeon, medical director
- Known for: Medical Director of the Institut Guttmann
- Awards: Gold Medal of the Club Européen de Santé (1992)
- Medical career
- Notable works: Development of the "Barcelona technique" for SARS implantation

Miguel Sarrias Domingo (19 January 1930 – 2002) was Medical Director of the Institut Guttmann in Barcelona, Catalonia, Spain.

== Early years ==
Sarrias Domingo was born in Barcelona on 19 January 1930, and he qualified in medicine and surgery at the University of Barcelona in 1955. Between 1958 and 1961 he studied under Josep Trueta, professor of orthopedic surgery in Oxford, where he specialized in orthopedic surgery and traumatology.

== Institut Guttmann ==
In 1964, plans were underway for the creation of a hospital dedicated to the treatment of people with paraplegia and quadriplegia, the first of its kind in Spain. Sarrias was named medical director. He spent 7 months at Stoke Mandeville hospital in England studying under Dr. Ludwig Guttmann where he learned the specialized treatment of people with spinal cord lesions.

The new hospital was opened on 27 November 1965 and was named after Dr. Guttmann, as the Institut Guttmann Spinal Cord Injuries Centre.

Until his retirement in 1997, Sarrias directed the work of the hospital, bringing it to national importance. Under his directorship, the Institute advanced the use of the "Barcelona technique" for the implantation of SARS (Sacral anterior roots electro stimulation).

He developed a programme for the training of new specialists, and he supported the advancement of treatment for people with spinal cord injuries and related academic societies both in Spain and internationally.

== Professional groups ==
Sarrias was the Spanish representative of IMSOP (The International Medical Society of Paraplegia), and he was both the initiator and president of SEP (Spanish Society of Paraplegia). He was a member of the editorial board of the journal Paraplegia Spinal Cord. In 1992 he organized the IMSOP Annual Scientific Meeting in Barcelona coinciding with the Paralympic Games; in the same year he was awarded the gold medal of the Club Européen de Santé and was elected a life member of the Académie Médicale Européenne de Réadaptation.
