= Rina Soldevilla =

Peruvian writer (born 1964)

Rina Soldevilla (born 1964 in Huasahuasi, Peru) is a Peruvian writer best known for her Spanish short stories, poems, and novel. Her work has been translated into numerous languages, including English.

Soldevilla has received awards and recognition for her literary contributions from many organizations including, the International Library of Poetry, the Peruvian-American National Council, and Tauro College. In 2014, she was chosen by El Diario La Prensa as an Outstanding Woman. In addition, Soldevilla was honored by the White House as a leading writer in her community.

Soldevilla's work concentrates on the traditional telling of scary stories, in the manner of her native country. Her work has been well-received by critics and audiences.

== Biography ==
Soldevilla was born in Huasahuasi, Peru near Lima in 1964 but has since moved to the United States. While in Peru, she worked as a dancer and actress. She now lives in New York City with her husband Enrique and two sons, Karlo and Randy.

== Bibliography ==
- 2001: Cuentos Extraordinarios
- 2010: Los Ojos de Ignacio
- 2017: La Cuna de mis Poemas
- 2018: Tales of the Extraordinary

== Awards ==
- 2014: Outstanding Woman by El Diario de la Prensa

== See also ==
- Peruvian literature
- List of Peruvian writers
