= General Capdevila =

Coordinates: 27°26′S 61°28′W

- Municipality and village
- Interactive map of General Capdevila
- Country: Argentina
- Province: Chaco Province
- Time zone: UTC−3 (ART)

General Capdevila is a village and municipality in Chaco Province in northern Argentina.
