= Assumpció Sallés i González =

Catalan lawyer

Assumpció Sallés i González (Barcelona, 1940) is a Catalan lawyer, who was a member of the Bar Association of Barcelona and member of the PSUC during the Spanish transition to democracy. She was a member of the Justice, Law and Citizen Security Commission of the Parliament of Catalonia and participated actively in the adaptation of the Civil Code of Catalonia.
