= Daiana Capdevila =

Argentine chemist (born 1987)

Daiana Andrea Capdevila (born in 1987) is an Argentine chemist, winner of the L'Oréal-UNESCO For Women in Science Awards for her studies to measure water pollution. She is an independent researcher at CONICET of the Institute of Investigaciones Bioquímicas de Buenos Aires (IIBBA, CONICET-Fundación Instituto Leloir) and head of laboratory of the Leloir Institute.

Daiana Capdevila graduated from the Colegio Nacional de Buenos Aires, later she graduated with a degree and a doctorate in Chemical Sciences in the area of Inorganic, Analytical and Physical Chemistry from the Faculty of Exact and Natural Sciences of the University of Buenos Aires. Doctoral thesis presented in 2015 addressed the Mechanisms of induction and regulation of the alternative function of cytochrome c: structural foundations.
