= Marta Mata =

Spanish politician and pedagogue (1926–2006)

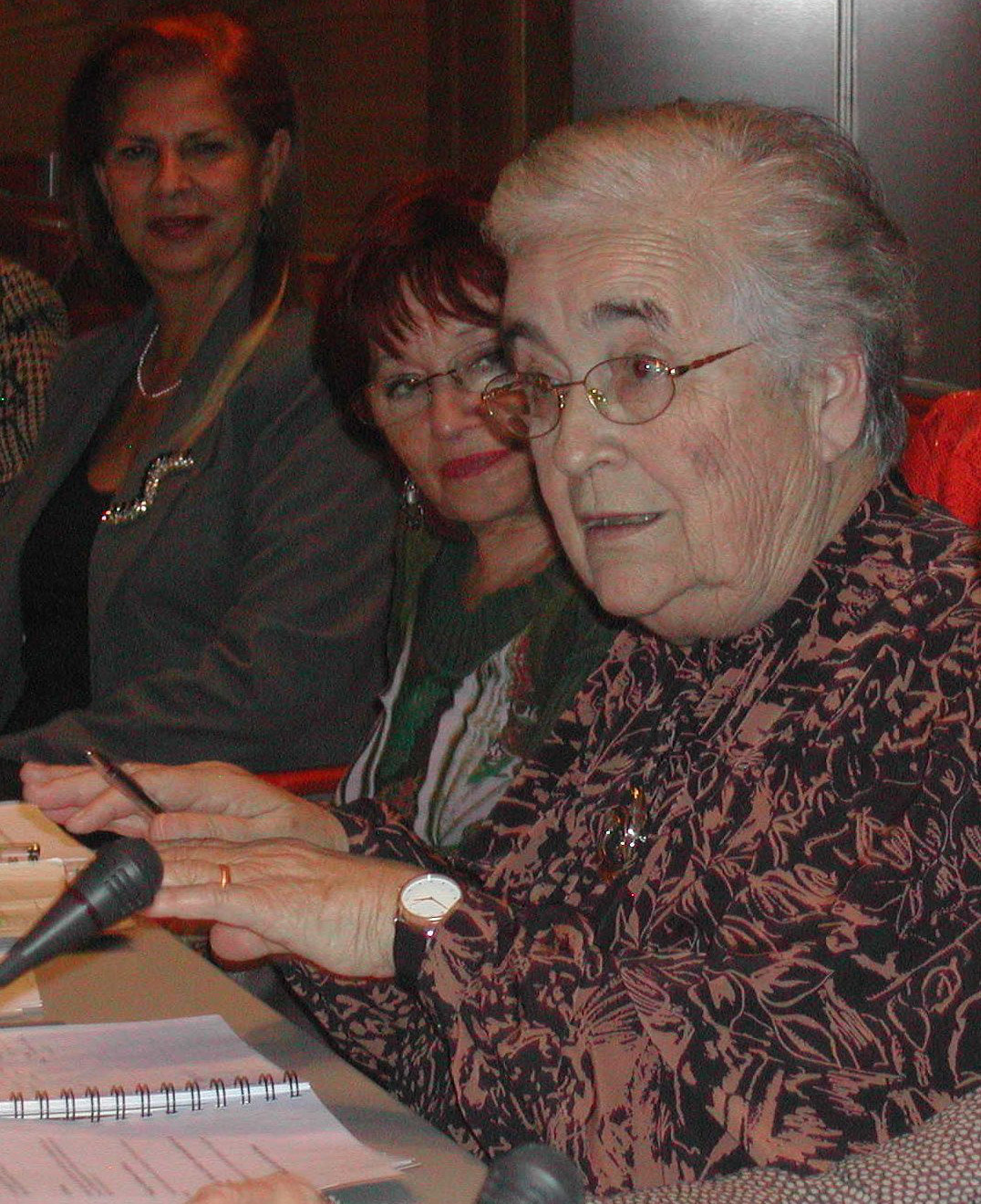
- January 2006

Personal details
- Born: Marta Ángela Mata Garriga; 22 June 1926 Barcelona, Spain
- Died: 27 June 2006 (aged 80) Barcelona, Spain
- Party: PSC
- Parents: Josep Mata Virgili (father); Àngels Garriga (mother)
- Education: University of Barcelona
- Occupation: Pedagogue, politician
- Awards: Grand Cross of Alfonso X, the Wise (1988); Creu de Sant Jordi (1997); Gold Medal of Honor of the Parliament of Catalonia (2015)
- Website: www.martamata.cat

Senator of Spain
- In office 6 June 1993 – 9 January 1996
- Constituency: Barcelona

Member of the City Council of Barcelona
- In office 1987–1995

Deputy of the Parliament of Catalonia
- In office 1984–1988
- Constituency: Barcelona

Senator of Spain
- In office 9 March 1983 – 26 June 1984
- Constituency: Parliament of Catalonia

Deputy of the Parliament of Catalonia
- In office 1980–1984
- Constituency: Tarragona

Member of the Congress of Deputies of Spain
- In office 15 March 1979 – 26 March 1980
- Constituency: Barcelona

Member of the Constituent Legislature of Spain
- In office 13 July 1977 – 22 March 1979
- Constituency: Barcelona

Marta Ángela Mata Garriga (22 June 1926 – 27 June 2006) was a Spanish politician and pedagogue who promoted the renovation of public schools during Spain's transition to democracy in 1978, and defended secular schools. She was the founder of the Associació de Mestres Rosa Sensat and wrote numerous books and articles on reading and writing didactics, pedagogy, educational policy, and children's stories.

== Biography ==
Marta Mata's connection with the world of education originated with her mother, Àngels Garriga, who was a pedagogue, teacher, and writer trained in the Summer Schools before the Civil War, and in the Commonwealth of Catalonia, with Pompeu Fabra, Arturo Martorell, Alexandre Galí, Rosa Sensat, Pau Vila, and Carles Cardó. Her father was Josep Mata Virgili (1886–1934), an industrial technician, who died in a work accident in Madrid when Marta was 8 years old.

She went to kindergarten and elementary schools of the Barcelona City School Board, where her mother worked. In 1937 she began high school at the Institut-Escola de la Generalitat de Catalunya. In 1939 her teachers and professors were dismissed or dispersed because of the Civil War. She finished high school in 1943 at the Verdaguer Institute, and began her studies in Natural Sciences at the University of Barcelona, but before finishing the first year she was forced to interrupt her studies due to tuberculosis.

In 1944 she moved to Saifores (Banyeres), to the family house Cal Mata, an inheritance from her father. There she spent a long convalescence and, once restored to health, began to work in children's education following guidance from her mother who, because of a paralysis, had also retired to the country. Mother and daughter resided at Cal Mata until 1965.

In Saifores she started her university studies again and enrolled at the University of Barcelona's Faculty of Philosophy and Letters. She obtained a licentiate in Pedagogy in 1957 and continued with doctorate courses.

== Pedagogical renovation ==
In Saifores, Mata also began her collaboration with the first groups of teachers involved in the pedagogical renovation movement that promoted Spanish education during the Second Republic, and with the resurgence of schools that proposed a renewal of education in Catalan. She also contacted the pedagogues Alexandre Galí, Artur Martorell, and Jordi Rubió, of whom she considered herself a disciple.

In 1959 she traveled to Geneva for the first time and contacted the International Bureau of Education, where she met the pedagogue Pere Rosselló. She also began working as a pedagogical consultant for the Catalan publishers Nova Terra and La Galera, and the recently created children's magazine Cavall Fort. She worked on some publications of the National Institute of Spanish Books and publishers Teide and Vicens Vives. In the summer of 1964 she lived for a month on Israel's Dvir kibbutz, where she learned its educational system.

In 1965 she moved her residence to Barcelona. Facing the impossibility of freely creating professorship training centers during the Francoist regime, together with a team of teachers of diverse schools and the support of parents of the alumni of these schools, she clandestinely created the Associació de Mestres Rosa Sensat with the objectives of training teachers and building a democratic, active, public, and quality school. The project extended into the so-called Summer Schools, with an important footprint inside and outside of Catalonia.

From 1965 to 1975 Mata strengthened her relationship with groups of teachers working on pedagogical renovation in Spain and Portugal, and established contacts with university professors and institutions in France, England, the USSR, Chile, and Italy, while specializing in teaching in language contact situations, and in the didactics of written language and Catalan and Spanish phonology.

From the Rosa Sensat school she promoted the creation of the magazine Perspectiva Escolar in 1974, and in 1975 promoted the declaration of the 10th Summer School: Por una nueva Escuela Pública (For a New Public School).

During 1982 and 1983 she participated in the organization and realization of the 1st Congress of Pedagogical Renovation Movements, sponsored by the Ministry of Education.

In 1984 she created the Àngels Garriga de Mata Foundation, now called the Marta Mata Garriga Foundation, an entity whose objective is the development of a dynamic conception of the school and the establishment of relations between the worlds of culture, work, entertainment, and civics. The Foundation has a library specialized in education, and archives of Mata's documents.

== Political career ==
The death of Francisco Franco opened the door to greater political involvement for Marta Mata, who joined Socialist Convergence of Catalonia (CSC) in 1976, directed by Joan Reventós, which became part of the Socialist Party of Catalonia–Congress and, two years later, the Socialists' Party of Catalonia (PSC).

In the general elections of 1977 she was elected deputy for the district of Barcelona for the socialist coalition, and was part of the Constituent Legislature. In these years she combined the work of deputy with that of the Rosa Sensat school. From this legislature, Marta highlighted the fact that "the new legislation contemplates the participation of parents, teachers, and students in the school, and new capabilities for Catalonia."

In 1979 she was reelected, and also held a seat in the 1st Legislature until 1980, when she was elected Deputy to the Parliament of Catalonia for the district of Tarragona. From 1983 to 1984 she was a Senator representing the Parliament of Catalonia, and was one of the socialist rapporteurs, together with José Eduardo González Navas, of the first Law on Linguistic Normalization of Catalan in 1983.

From 1984 to 1988 she returned to the Parliament of Catalonia for the constituency of Barcelona. From 1987 to 1995 she was Councilor for Education of the City Council of Barcelona, where she promoted the Educating Cities movement. From 1987 to 1991, she was also responsible for the Education Department of the Barcelona Provincial Council. From 1993 to 1996 she was again Senator for the district of Barcelona.

Mata was vice president of the Spanish School Council from its founding in 1986 until June 2002, when she resigned in protest at the way in which the Popular Party Government passed the Organic Law on the Quality of Education (LOCE), noting that it "would not allow its debate in depth."

She was also a member of the Catalan School Council as a representative of the Federation of Municipalities from 1987 to 1995, and President of the Municipal School Council of Barcelona (which had been established during her tenure as Councilor for Education) by delegation of its mayor from 1990 to 1995.

She left politics in 1996 after her official retirement. She then dealt with putting her writings in order and preparing some publications. She also collaborated on various educational projects, including the coordination of the program "El Forum en la escuela" within the framework of the Barcelona 2004 Forum.

In May 2004, she returned to the State School Council as President at the request of the then Socialist Minister María Jesús San Segundo, a responsibility she held until her death on 27 June 2006.

When she died, the then President of the Generalitat of Catalonia and personal friend of Mata, Pasqual Maragall, remembered her as the person who "pushed the pedagogical tradition to its maximum splendor".

== Principal works ==
- Letra por letra: material programado para la enseñanza de la lectura y la escritura. Barcelona, La Galera, 1976.
- Llengua standard i nivells de llenguatge. Barcelona, Laia, 1976 (with Lluís López del Castillo).
- Cuadros de fonología castellana para la enseñanza de la lectura y la escritura. Barcelona, Bibliograf, 1978 (with Josep M. Cormand).
- Pensemos en la nueva educación. Madrid, Nuestra Cultura, 1981 (with M. J. Udina).
- Fonemas, sonidos y grafías del vocabulario básico castellano. Barcelona, Rosa Sensat, 1982.
- Fonemes, sons i grafies del vocabulari bàsic català. Barcelona, Rosa Sensat, 1986.
- Civismo y urbanidad. Barcelona, Regidoria d'Edicions i Publicacions, 1993.
- La educación pública. Barcelona, Destino, 1997.

== Distinctions ==
- Grand Cross of Alfonso X, the Wise from Juan Carlos I of Spain, 2 December 1988
- Named Illustrious Daughter of Banyeres del Penedès, Saifores municipality, 10 March 1995
- Gold Medal of Scientific Merit from the City Council of Barcelona, 2 September 1997
- Creu de Sant Jordi from the Generalitat de Catalunya, 21 October 1997
- Invested as doctor honoris causa by the Autonomous University of Barcelona, 5 May 1999
- Ramon Fuster Award from the College of Doctors and Graduates in Philosophy and Letters and Sciences of Catalonia, 18 December 2001
- Grand Cross of the Order of Charles III (posthumous) from Juan Carlos I of Spain, 30 June 2006
- Honorable Mention of the 12th Mestres Award (posthumous), September 2006
- Lola Soler Blánquez Award (posthumous) from the Lola Soler Blánquez Foundation, 10 October 2006
- The Maritime Safety and Rescue Society named the tugboat Marta Mata (BS-33) in her honor, July 2009
- Gold Medal of Honor of the Parliament of Catalonia (posthumous), March 2015
