= Jorge H. Capdevila =

Chilean-American biochemist

- Born: October 6, 1940 (age 86); Santiago, Chile
- Education: University of Chile, University of Georgia
- Occupation: Biochemist

Jorge H. Capdevila (born October 6, 1940) is a Chilean-American biochemist and professor emeritus of medicine at Vanderbilt University Medical School. Recognized for his contributions to the molecular understanding of hypertension, Capdevila was elected a fellow of the American Heart Association (AHA) in 2002 and received the AHA's 2004 Novartis Excellence Award for Hypertension Research.

His research identified the roles of cytochrome P450 (P450) enzymes in the metabolism of arachidonic acid (AA), as well as the physiological and pathophysiological significance of these enzymes and their metabolites. These discoveries were honored in a dedicated special section at the 14th International Winter Eicosanoid Conference (2012).

In 2017, Capdevila was awarded the Outstanding Achievement Award by the Eicosanoid Research Foundation during the 15th International Conference on Bioactive Lipids in Cancer, Inflammation, and Related Diseases.

== Personal life ==
Capdevila was born in Santiago, Chile.

== Career ==
Capdevila earned a degree in biochemistry from the University of Chile in 1969. He later completed his Ph.D. at the University of Georgia in 1975.

His postdoctoral training included work with Sten Orrenius at the Karolinska Institute in Sweden, and with Russell A. Prough and Ronald W. Estabrook at the University of Texas Health Science Center at Dallas (now the University of Texas Southwestern Medical Center (UTSW)). Capdevila began his independent research career in 1984 as a research assistant professor of biochemistry at UTSW.

In 1986, he joined Vanderbilt University Medical School as an associate professor of medicine and biochemistry. He was promoted to full professor in 1991 and retired as professor emeritus of medicine in 2015. Throughout his career, Capdevila authored 206 peer-reviewed publications and holds five U.S. patents.

== Scientific contributions ==
=== Cytochrome P450 arachidonic acid monooxygenase metabolic pathway ===
Following his 1981 report on the involvement of microsomal cytochrome (P450) enzymes in the oxidation of arachidonic acid (AA), Capdevila conducted foundational studies on the biochemical and enzymatic properties of this metabolic pathway. These investigations led to two key advances:

1. Structural identification of the 5,6-, 8,9-, 11,12-, and 14,15-epoxyeicosatrienoic acids (EETs) and 19- and 20-hydroxyeicosatetraenoic acids (19- and 20-HETE) as products of the epoxygenase and ω-hydroxylase branches of P450 AA monooxygenase, respectively.
2. Characterization of EETs as endogenous metabolites of AA in rodent and human organs, establishing the AA epoxygenase pathway as a physiologically relevant system.

Subsequent work by Capdevila's laboratory identified roles for the CYP2 subfamily of enzymes in endogenous EET biosynthesis;

- Novel endogenous glycerolipid pools containing esterified EET moieties;
- Soluble epoxide hydrolase (sEH; epoxide hydrolase 2) as the enzyme responsible for catalyzing EET hydration to vicinal dihydroxyeicosatrienoic acids (DHETs), a step preceding their urinary excretion.

As of 2013, research focuses on developing sEH inhibitors to modulate organ-specific levels of EETs and their associated biological effects.

=== Functional roles of AA epoxygenase metabolites ===
Early studies by Capdevila and collaborators demonstrated that epoxyeicosatrienoic acids (EETs):

- Stimulated the release of hormones in the brain, pituitary gland, and pancreas;
- Modulated signaling by epidermal growth factor;
- Inhibited renal Na⁺ and K⁺ transport in isolated collecting ducts;
- Exhibited vasodilatory effects in vascular tissues.

These findings represented the first identification of EET-associated biological activities in vitro and laid the groundwork for subsequent research into the physiological and pathophysiological roles of the arachidonic acid (AA) epoxygenase pathway and its metabolites.

=== Physiological and Pathophysiological Roles of the Arachidonic Acid Monooxygenase Pathway ===
Capdevila's research group provided unequivocal genetic and biochemical evidence that, as suggested earlier, members of the P450 murine Cyp4a and Cyp2c gene subfamilies participated in the control of systemic blood pressures by showing that targeted disruption of the: a) Cyp4a14 gene caused a type of hypertension that was male-specific and associated with increases in plasma androgens, the renal expression of the Cyp4a12 AA omega hydroxylase, and the biosynthesis of pro-hypertensive 20-HETE. The potential clinical relevance of these studies was highlighted by reports of associations between a functional variant of the human CYP4A11 20-HETE synthase (the T8590C polymorphism) and hypertension in White Americans, hypertension, the progression of kidney disease in African-Americans, and risk of hypertension in German and Japanese cohorts; b) Cyp4a10 gene downregulated the expression of the kidney Cyp2c44 epoxygenase, leading to reductions in renal EET biosynthesis and the development of dietary salt sensitive hypertension; and c) Cyp2c44 gene caused dietary salt-sensitive hypertension linked to reductions in renal EET biosynthesis and excretion, as well as increases in sodium retention in the distal nephron. Abnormalities in the regulation of urinary EET pools in normotensive, dietary salt-sensitive, individuals have been reported. Collectively, these studies identified: a) 20-HETE as a renal vasoconstrictor and pro-hypertensive lipid; and b) 11,12-EET as an endogenous natriuretic and anti-hypertensive mediator. Additionally, they demonstrated that salt-sensitive hypertension could result from either a down regulation or lack of a functional Cyp2c44 epoxygenase. These achievements, highlighted in independent reviews, contributed as an stimulant to ongoing efforts to further define the physiological and pathophysiological relevance of the AA monooxygenase enzymes and its metabolites, as well as potentially novel targets for drug development.

More recently, Capdevila participated in the identification of roles for the Cyp2c44 epoxygenases and the EETs in tumor vascularization and progression in rodent models of human non-small-cell-lung cancer (NSCLC); and in clinical studies showing improved survival in female cases of NSCLC that were carriers of two known reduction of function variants of the human CYP2C9 epoxygenase gene.

In summary, Capdevila and his collaborators contributed to the initial discovery and characterization of the roles of CYP450 monooxygenases in the metabolism and bioactivation of endogenous arachidonic acid, the identification of its role in the in vivo regulation of cellular, organ, and systemic physiology, and to its current recognition as an important physiological and pathophysiological metabolic pathway.
