= Frederic J. Porta i Capdevila =

Catalan historian and political scientist

- Born: 1996 (age 29–30); Barcelona, Catalonia
- Education: Universitat Pompeu Fabra
- Known for: Catalan historian and political scientist

Frederic Josep Porta i Capdevila (born 1996) is a contemporary Catalan historian and political scientist known for his study on Catalan nationalism and political thought. His research and publications. Since January 2025 he is the director of the Catalan magazine Revista de Catalunya.

== Early life and education ==
Born in Barcelona, Catalonia, Porta graduated in Political Science in 2018 and has a master's degree in world history at Universitat Pompeu Fabra. He doctorated in the same university in 2021 with a dissertation thesis on the life of Catalan intellectual and leader Josep Maria Batista i Roca. He has served as a postdoctoral researcher at the Universitat de Barcelona (UB), where he continued to delve into the complexities of Catalan nationalism and Catalan contemporary history and taught subjects on contemporary history. He founded and is currently the director of the Catalan political and cultural magazine Esperit. This publication serves as a platform for contemporary political thought and history, where Porta regularly contributes with articles.

== Career ==
Porta's career has been marked by a series of academic contributions. He has served as a postdoctoral researcher at the Universitat de Barcelona (UB), where he continued to delve into the complexities of Catalan nationalism. In addition to his academic roles, he is the director of the cultural magazine Esperit. This publication serves as a platform for contemporary political thought and history, where Porta Capdevila regularly contributes articles that reflect his engagement with the subject matter.

== Research and publications ==
Porta's research is primarily focused on the political thought and history of Catalan nationalism. He has published the biography of Catalan separatist politician Josep Dencàs and the complete works of Catalan separatism founder and leader Daniel Cardona i Civit.

Some of his better-known publications include:

1. L’Intransigent. Periòdic nacionalista de joventuts (1918-1922): una publicació de transició del separatisme polític - This work examines the role of the nationalist youth publication L’Intransigent in the transition of political separatism in Catalonia during the early 20th century.
2. L’exemple de Sèrbia en el naixement de l’independentisme polític català (1912-1918) - In this publication, Porta Capdevila explores the influence of the Serbian model on the emergence of Catalan political independence movements.
3. Una proposta de separatisme català francòfil: La proclamació de la República Catalana peninsular de Díaz Capdevila i la Lliga Nacionalista Catalana (París, gener de 1922) - This work delves into the proposal of a Francophile Catalan separatism and the proclamation of the Peninsular Catalan Republic.
4. Resistències paramilitars i culturals del separatisme català durant la dictadura de Primo de Rivera, 1923-1930 - This publication investigates the paramilitary and cultural resistances of Catalan separatism during the dictatorship of Primo de Rivera.
