= Vicenç Capdevila =

Spanish lawyer and politician (1936–2020)

Mayor of L'Hospitalet de Llobregat
- In office 3 April 1973 – 1977
- Preceded by: José Matías de España Muntadas
- Succeeded by: Juan Perelló Masllorens

Deputy of Congress
- In office 4 July 1977 – 2 January 1979
- Constituency: Barcelona

Member Parliament of Catalonia
- In office 10 April 1980 – 20 March 1984
- Constituency: Barcelona

Personal details
- Born: 28 October 1936 L'Hospitalet de Llobregat, Catalonia, Spain
- Died: 21 March 2020 (aged 83)
- Cause of death: COVID-19
- Party: Union of the Democratic Centre
- Education: University of Deusto

Vicenç Capdevila i Cardona (28 October 1936 – 21 March 2020) was a Spanish lawyer and politician.

== Biography ==
He served as the mayor of L'Hospitalet de Llobregat from 1973 to 1977, as a member of the Congress of Deputies from 1977 to 1979, representing Barcelona and also as a Member parliament of Catalonia from 1980 to 1984, again representing Barcelona.

He died on 21 March 2020, from COVID-19 during the COVID-19 pandemic in Spain at the age of 83.
