= The Triplets =

Animated series

- Cover of the DVD for "The Triplets and Gaudí".
- Genre: Adventure
- Created by: Roser Capdevila
- Based on: The Triplets by Roser Capdevila
- Directed by: Robert Balser, Baltasar Roca (Season 1); Maria Gol, Jordi Valbuena (Season 2)
- Voices of: Teresa Soler; Mònica Padròs; Marta Barbarà; Elsa Fabregas
- Theme music composer: Josep Lladó
- Opening theme: "We Are The Triplets!" performed by Patricia Rodriguez and Pauline Little
- Ending theme: "I'd Rather Be a Witch (Than Anything Else in the World)" performed by Kathleen Fee
- Composers: Josep Lladó (Season 1 & 2); Joan Albert Amargós (Season 1)
- Country of origin: Spain
- Original language: Catalan
- No. of seasons: 2
- No. of episodes: 104 (Complete list)

Production
- Executive producers: Televisió de Catalunya; Sergi Reitg (Season 1); Oriol Ivern (Season 2)
- Running time: 24 minutes circa
- Production companies: Televisió de Catalunya; Cromosoma

Original release
- Network: TV3; La 2 Clan; Teletoon (Canada); Treehouse TV (Canada)
- Release: 1995 – 2004

Related
- The Bored Witch; The Baby Triplets

The Triplets (Catalan: Les tres bessones; Spanish: Las tres mellizas) are three fictional characters (Anna, Teresa and Helena) created by Catalan illustrator Roser Capdevila.

The Triplets were created in 1983, based on Capdevila's own daughters, three actual triplets born in 1969. The stories were immediately successful and began publishing in many countries. In 1985 a new character, the "Bored Witch" (La Bruixa Avorrida, in Catalan) was added to the plots to form a collection of classical stories, "The Triplets and (...)".

In 1994, television producer Cromosoma and the Catalan TV corporation Televisió de Catalunya adapted the stories to make an animated series based on the books. It became very successful and profitable upon its debut in 1995 and led to the production of a second series with the Bored Witch as the main character, together with France 3, Canal J and Storimages. The show was also the first program aired on Télétoon.

By 2004, The Triplets series consisted of 104 episodes, while The Bored Witch reached 52. They have been translated from Catalan to 35 different languages and have been shown in 158 countries or territories. A spin-off series was later produced in 2006, titled The Baby Triplets.

In the mid-2000s, Cromosoma sold the series to Jazeera Children's Channel, however the Arabic network only aired 54 out of the 104 episodes, countering Capdevila's expressed wish of airing it without censorship. Most episodes featured Christian crosses, which are deemed forbidden in Islamic culture.

In October 2020, it was announced that the series would receive a reboot. The reboot is scheduled to be released in 2027.

== Plot ==
The plots of the triplet sisters follow a definite pattern. Sometimes they play some prank or manage to annoy the Bored Witch, and, to punish them, she sends them into a classic tale, legend, or children's or adult's (such as Frankenstein or The Phantom of the Opera) literary work. The main structure of the classic remains, but some twists (often hilarious anachronisms such as showing The forty thieves getting distracted from robbing a house by a camel race on TV or Dr. Frankenstein as a veterinarian) are introduced to favor each plot and define the sisters' personalities.

== Characters ==
- Tessa (Teresa in original Catalan) - She wears the pink ribbon. She is the most adventurous triplet and comes up with the most ambitious ideas, but she's not necessarily the leader.
- Annie (Anna in original Catalan) - She wears the blue ribbon. She's laid-back and more peaceful than her sisters. She's also quite curious. Annie tends to be a bit romantic at times.
- Nellie (Helena in original Catalan) - She wears the green ribbon. She has the sweetest demeanor of the triplets. She also has a love for food and sweets, which sometimes leads to trouble.
- The Bored Witch - She is an overweight witch who is always bored, despite having great magical powers. She serves as a kind of unofficial day sitter for the triplets, but when they start acting disorderly, she uses her magic to send the girls into stories. No matter what, she never uses magic to directly hinder the girls in their adventures, although tends to join forces with every story's antagonist. Despite her role of antagonist, she is not an evil character and always keeps her word to return the girls to their land.

== Episodes ==
The Triplets find themselves involved in a different classic story in each chapter.

=== Season 1 (1995-1999) ===
- Chapter 1: Hop o' My Thumb
- Chapter 2: Snow White
- Chapter 3: Cinderella
- Chapter 4: Ali Baba
- Chapter 5: Fearless John
- Chapter 6: The Tin Soldier
- Chapter 7: The Princess and the Pea
- Chapter 8: The Pied Piper of Hamelin
- Chapter 9: Bluebeard
- Chapter 10: Hansel and Gretel
- Chapter 11: The Three Little Pigs
- Chapter 12: The Emperor's New Clothes
- Chapter 13: Little Red Riding Hood
- Chapter 14: The Ugly Duckling
- Chapter 15: Aladdin
- Chapter 16: The Seven Samurai
- Chapter 17: The Musicians of Bremen
- Chapter 18: The Legend of the Red Dragon
- Chapter 19: Sleeping Beauty
- Chapter 20: Puss in Boots
- Chapter 21: Don Quixote
- Chapter 22: Pinocchio
- Chapter 23: Saint George
- Chapter 24: The Thieves of Baghdad
- Chapter 25: Jack and the Beanstalk
- Chapter 26: Knights of the Round Table
- Chapter 27: The Wizard of Oz
- Chapter 28: The Treasure Island
- Chapter 29: Sandokan
- Chapter 30: Oliver Twist
- Chapter 31: Helen of Troy
- Chapter 32: Robinson Crusoe
- Chapter 33: Robin Hood
- Chapter 34: Atlantis
- Chapter 35: The Jungle Book
- Chapter 36: Journey to the Center of the Earth
- Chapter 37: Merlin
- Chapter 38: Buffalo Bill
- Chapter 39: The Journeys of Ulysses
- Chapter 40: Romeo and Juliet
- Chapter 41: King Kong
- Chapter 42: Tarzan
- Chapter 43: Leonardo da Vinci
- Chapter 44: The Three Musketeers
- Chapter 45: Cleopatra
- Chapter 46: Christopher Columbus
- Chapter 47: The Cro-Magnon man
- Chapter 48: The Wolf and the Seven Kids
- Chapter 49: King Solomon's Mines
- Chapter 50: The Man from Mayapan
- Chapter 51: Marco Polo
- Chapter 52: Frankenstein
- Chapter 53: 20,000 Leagues Under the Sea
- Chapter 54: Kim of India
- Chapter 55: Amadeus
- Chapter 56: Santa Claus
- Chapter 57: In the Circus
- Chapter 58: In Outer Space
- Chapter 59: White Fang
- Chapter 60: Tom Sawyer
- Chapter 61: The Crystal Balalaika
- Chapter 62: Phantom of the Opera
- Chapter 63: Around the World in Eighty Days
- Chapter 64: Moby-Dick
- Chapter 65: In Africa

=== Season 2 (2003-2004) ===
- Chapter 66: The Magic Flute
- Chapter 67: The Little Mouse who Swept the Little House
- Chapter 68: Patufet
- Chapter 69: The Drummer from Bruc
- Chapter 70: Gaudi's Studio
- Chapter 71: The Phantoms of La Pedrera
- Chapter 72: Sherlock Holmes
- Chapter 73: The Cicada and the Ant
- Chapter 74: The Milkmaid
- Chapter 75: Cyrano de Bergerac
- Chapter 76: The World of Cinema
- Chapter 77: Geronimo
- Chapter 78: On Everest
- Chapter 79: Vincent van Gogh
- Chapter 80: Gutenberg's Printing Press
- Chapter 81: The Magical Bagpipe
- Chapter 82: Xuroi's Cave
- Chapter 83: The Steam Engine
- Chapter 84: Thor the Viking
- Chapter 85: Velázquez
- Chapter 86: The Valiant Little Tailor
- Chapter 87: Beauty and the Beast
- Chapter 88: William Tell
- Chapter 89: Captains Courageous
- Chapter 90: Zeila the Gazelle
- Chapter 91: The Little Mermaid
- Chapter 92: The Rosemary Flower
- Chapter 93: Dr. Jekyll and Mr. Hyde
- Chapter 94: The Prince and the Pauper
- Chapter 95: Tristan and Isolde
- Chapter 96: The Snow Queen
- Chapter 97: Agatha Christie
- Chapter 98: The Happy Prince
- Chapter 99: Tutankhamon
- Chapter 100: The Time Machine
- Chapter 101: The Lady Pirates
- Chapter 102: Holet the Goblin
- Chapter 103: The Invisible Man
- Chapter 104: The Birthday Party
- Movie: The Triplets and the Riddle of Don Quixote (2005)

== Voice actors ==
Character	Castilian voice		Catalan voice	English voice
Character	First season	Second season	Catalan voice	English voice
Annie	Ana Maria Camps	Ana Maria Camps	Teresa Soler	Patricia Rodriguez
Tessa	Noemi Bayarri	Noemi Bayarri	Mònica Padròs	Pauline Little
Nellie	Carmen Calvell	Carmen Calvell	Marta Barbarà	Pauline Little
The Bored Witch	Roser Huguet	Roser Huguet	Elsa Fabregas	Kathleen Fee
Owl (Buho)	Francisco Alborch	Jordi Vila	Jordi Vila	
Teacher	Mª Rosa Guillén	Ana Orra (some episodes) ?	?	
Mother of the triplets	Ana Orra	Ana Orra	?	
Father of the triplets	Vicente Gil	?	?	
