= Roser Capdevila =

Spanish Catalan writer (born 1939)

The Most Excellent Roser Capdevila
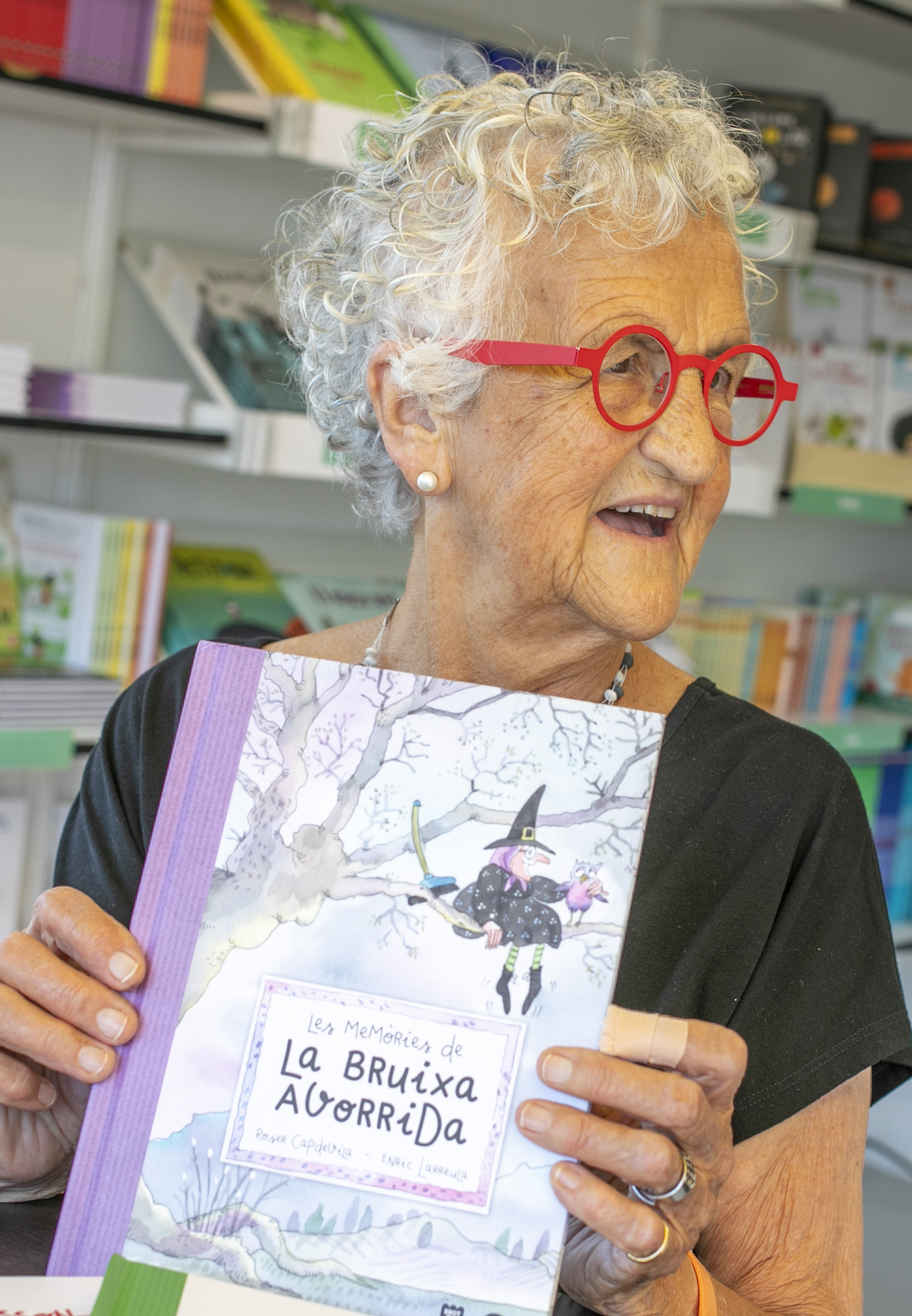
- Capdevila in 2023
- Born: Roser Capdevila i Valls; 23 January 1939 (age 87); Barcelona, Spain
- Education: Escola Massana
- Known for: Illustrations
- Notable work: The Triplets
- Children: Three daughters: Teresa, Anna, and Helena
- Awards: Creu de Sant Jordi; Gold Medal of Merit in the Fine Arts; Gold Medal of the Generalitat of Catalonia

Roser Capdevila i Valls (Barcelona, 23 January 1939) is a Spanish Catalan writer and illustrator, known internationally following the publication of the film adaptation of "Les tres bessones", The Triplets. The characters of "Les tres bessones" were inspired by Capdevila's three daughters, Teresa, Anna, and Helena.

== Biography ==
Interested in drawing from a young age, Roser Capdevila entered the Escola Massana in Barcelona.

During the 1970s, Capdevila collaborated with the French edition of the children's magazine Cuca Fera. In 1979, she was a finalist for the Premi Apel·les Mestres de Literatura Infantil Il·lustrada (Apel·les Mestres Prize for children's and youth illustrated literature) for her short story, "La cosidora". In 1980, she began to write and illustrate children's books, as well as works of popularization and entertainment for young people and adults. She also began to illustrate textbooks for children with her drawings, characterized by a simple style, but with a fresh and dynamic caricature. Likewise, her work has stood out for a sense of humor and very original situations. In 1983, inspired by her three daughters, Teresa, Anna, and Helena, she created the characters of "Les tres bessones" (The Triplets), whose books have been translated into 35 languages and led to the creation of a television series in 1994 by the production company Cromosoma and in collaboration with Mercè Company, when at that time, there were no girl protagonists in cartoons, which was broadcast in 158 countries.

In 1999, she was awarded the Premi Nacional d'Audiovisual in the Audiovisual section, and in 2004, with the Creu de Sant Jordi, both awards granted by the Generalitat de Catalunya. In 2011, she gave her legacy, made up of more than 3,000 drawings, lithographs, engravings, and stories, to the Library of Catalonia.

In 2018, Capdevila published the memoir La nena que volia dibuixar (The Girl Who Wanted to Draw) (Angle Editorial) where she writes about her childhood: a world marked by the post-war period, the power of the Church, and by the persistent attempts to indoctrination, a world where, despite all this, she was able to create her own.

"For me, drawing is breathing. The day I don't draw I'm dead, I'll be taken to the funeral home straight away. But, above all, that they leave me a pencil and a notebook next to me, just in case..." –Roser Capdevila

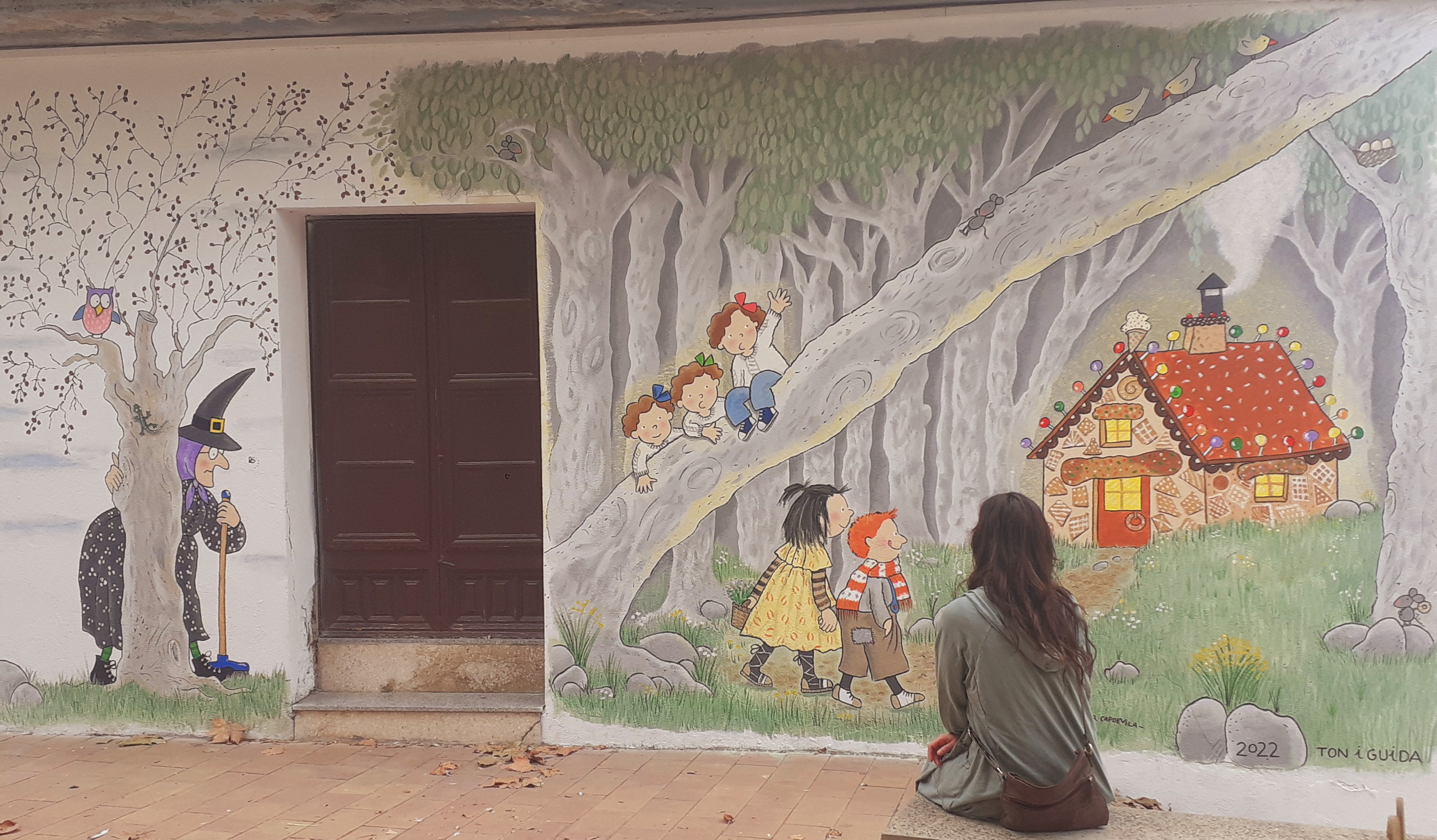
The "Les Tres Bessones" mural of Roser Capdevila (Penelles, 2022)

In 2022, as a special guest, she made her first Les Tres Bessones mural at the 7th edition of the Gargar Festival in Penelles. For four days, the illustrator, together with her daughters and a niece, painted a mural based on the tale Les Tres Bessones, en Ton i la Guida, an adaptation of the traditional tale "Hansel and Gretel". In the large-scale drawing, the three sisters can be seen climbing a tree as they watch the characters from the story make their way to the candy house where the witch lives. All this occurs under the attentive gaze of the "Bored Witch" who observes the scene from behind a tree located on the left margin of the work.

== Awards and honours ==
According to the Index Translationum of UNESCO, Roser Capdevila is the author in the Catalan language that has been translated more times than any other since she surpassed another author, Mercè Rodoreda.

- 1979 - Finalist in the Apelles Mestres award.
- 1998 - Nominated as a representative of the Spanish State in the international Hans Christian Andersen Award for illustration.
- 1984 - Illustration Award of the Generalitat de Catalunya.
- 1997 - Möbius Award for the Play and Learn CD-ROM.
- 1999 - National Audiovisual Award of the Department of Culture of the Generalitat of Catalonia.
- 2001 - Àngel de Bronze communication award, from the University of Girona.
- 2002 - Francesc Macià Medal of the Department of Labor of the Government of Catalonia.
- 2004 - Germans Lleonart Award from the local ERC section of Alella.
- 2004 - Creu de Sant Jordi of the Generalitat de Catalunya.
- 2005 - Premi Trajectòria by the Gremi d'Editors de Catalunya
- 2006 - City Gold Medal for artistic merit, from Barcelona City Council.
- 2010 - Gold Medal of Merit in the Fine Arts by the Ministry of Culture.
- 2010 - Medal of Honor of the Parliament of Catalonia.
- 2022 - Gold Medal of the Generalitat of Catalonia.
