= Police ranks of Italy =

The Police ranks of Italian police officers denote the position of a given officer in the police hierarchy in Italian police forces.

== Polizia di Stato ==
The design of the rank badges were changed following the reorganization of careers in July 2017.

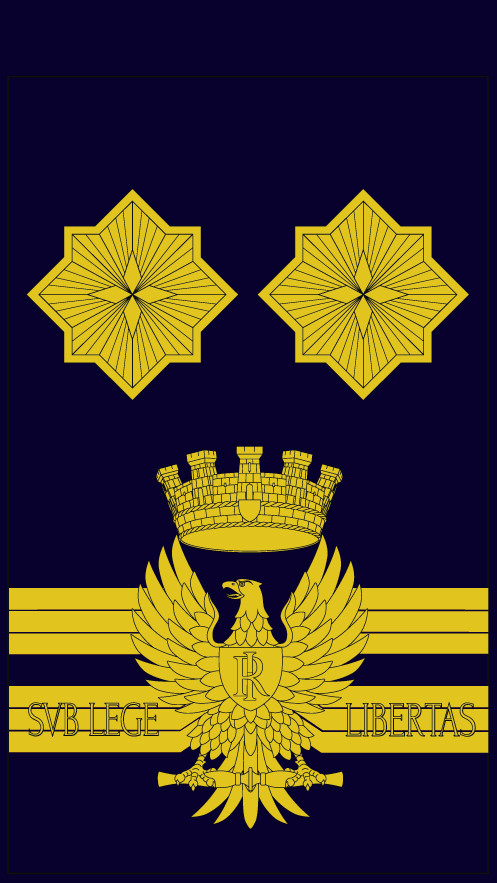
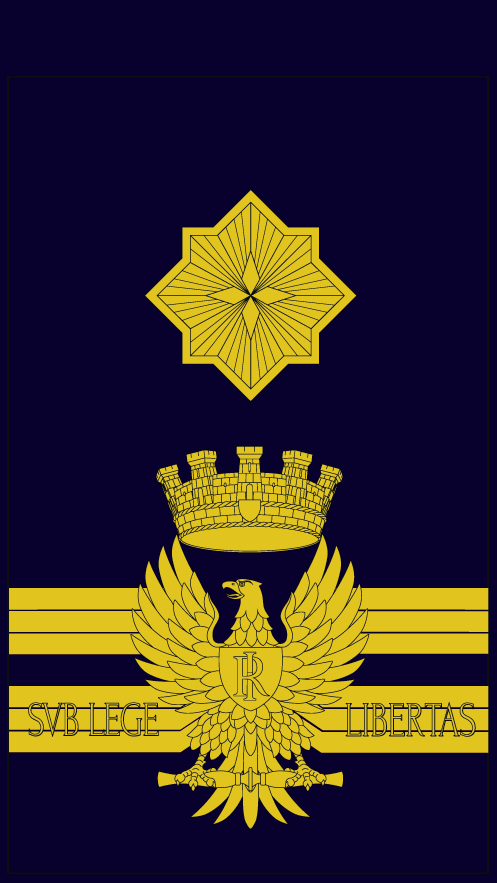
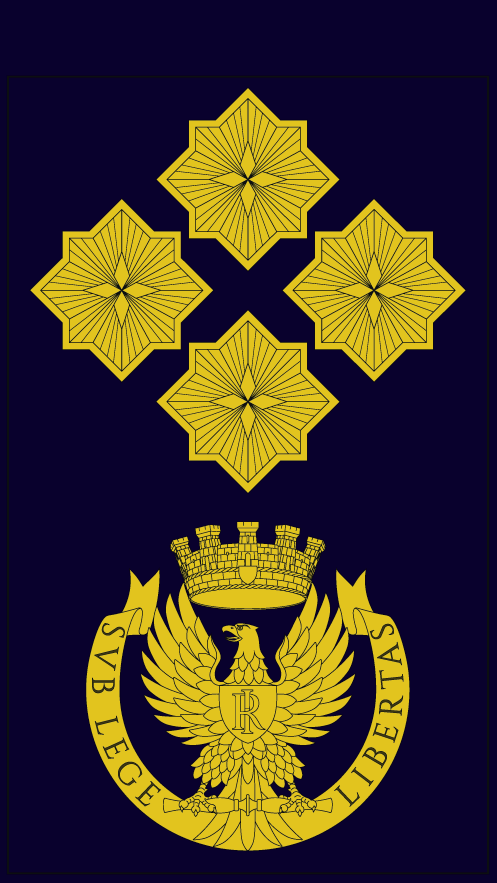
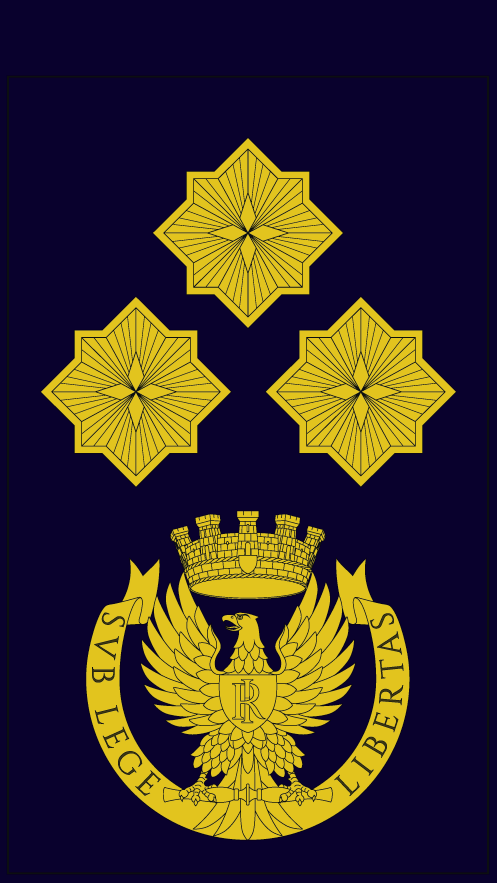
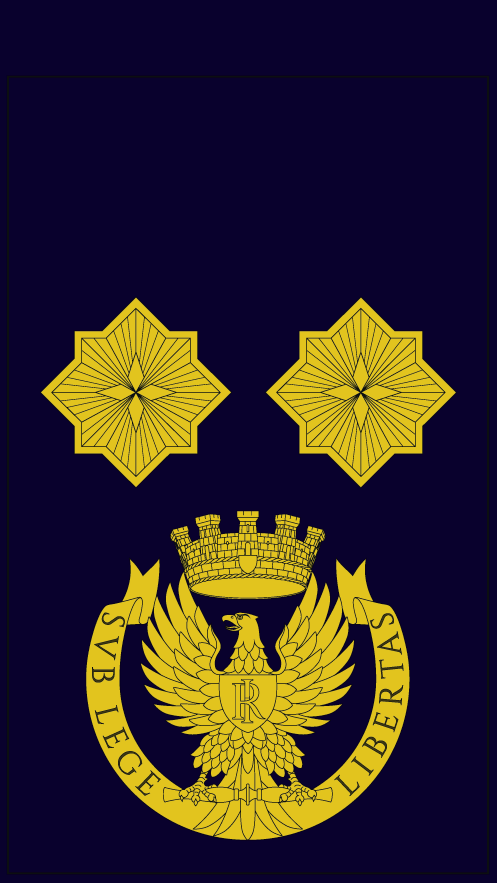
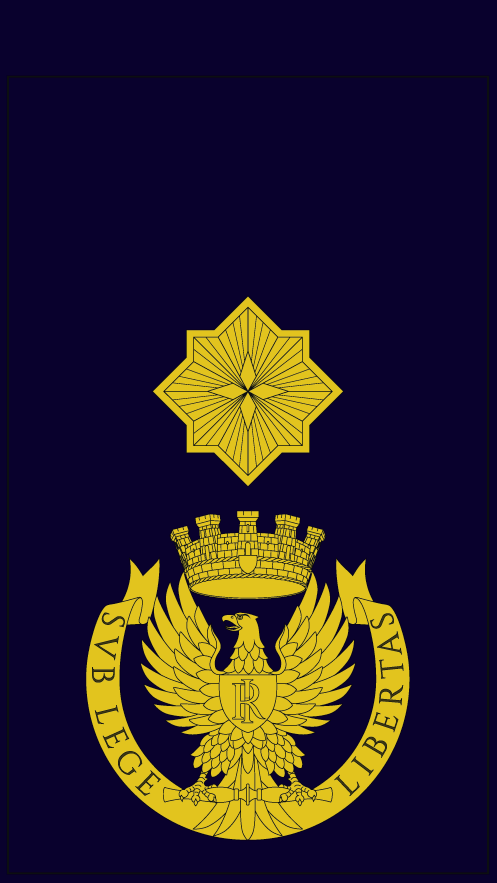
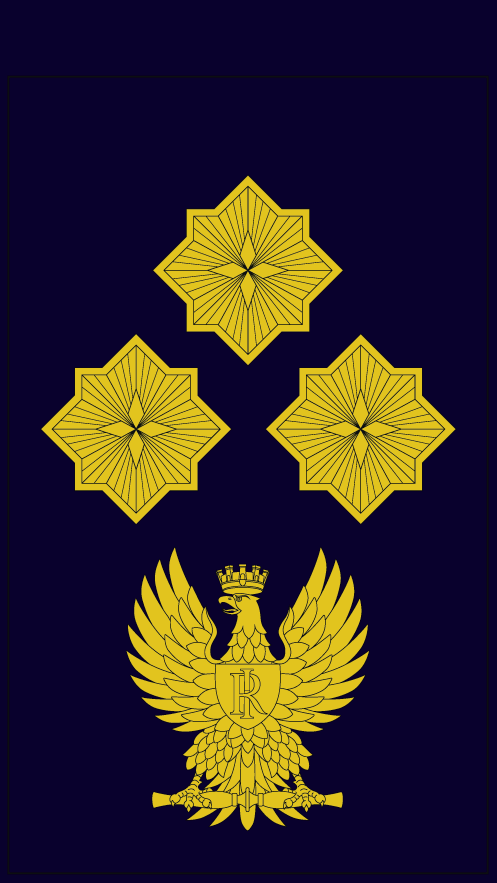
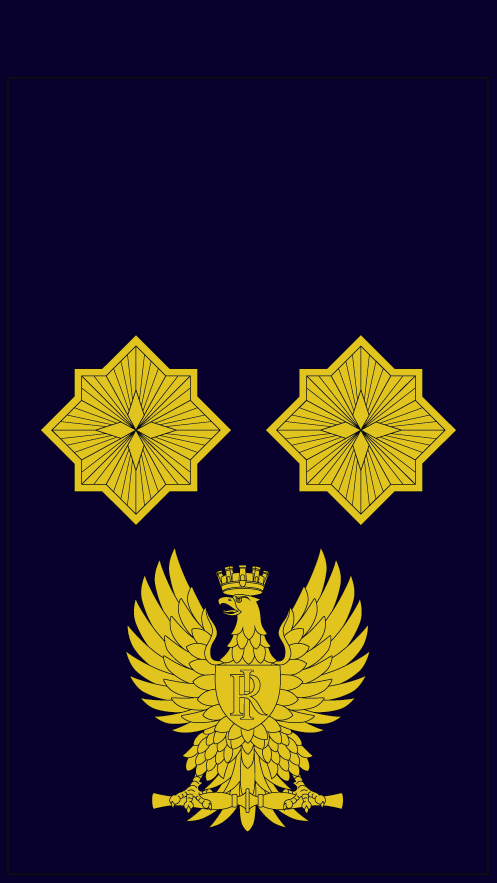
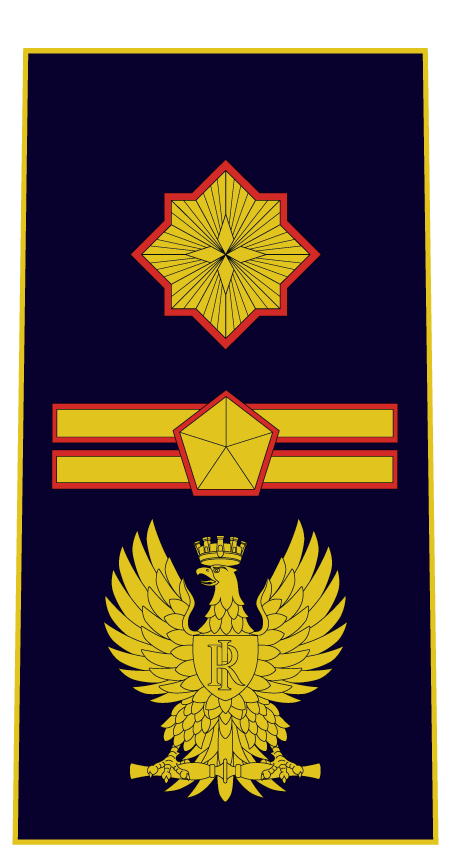
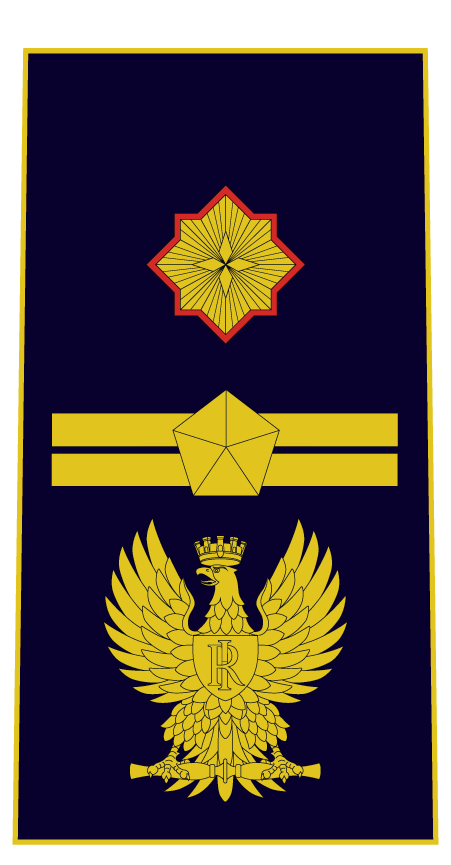
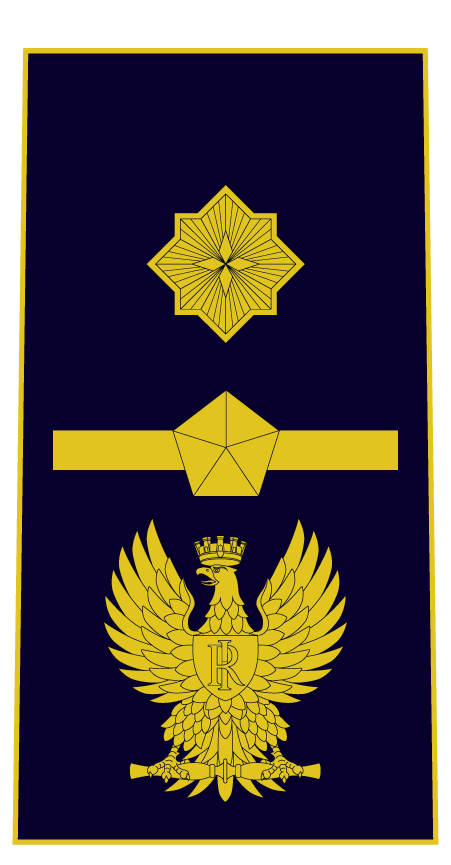
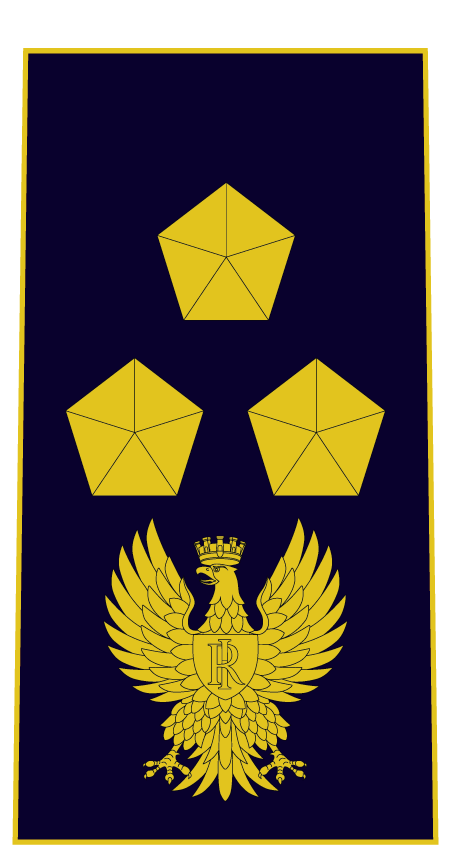
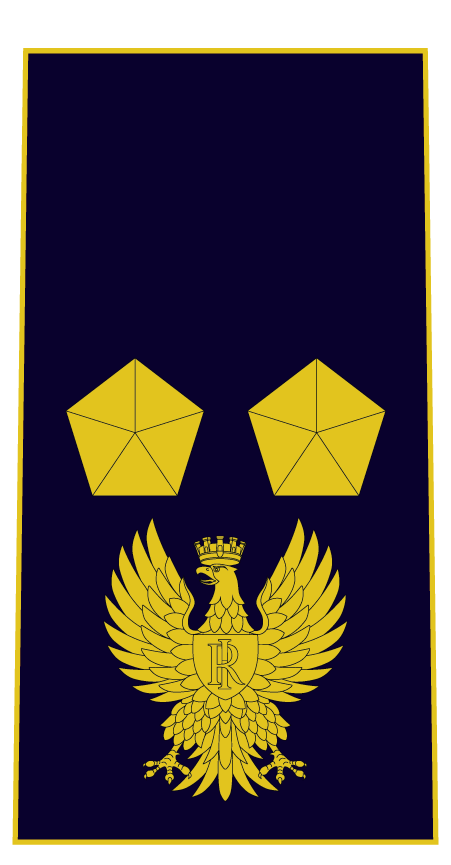
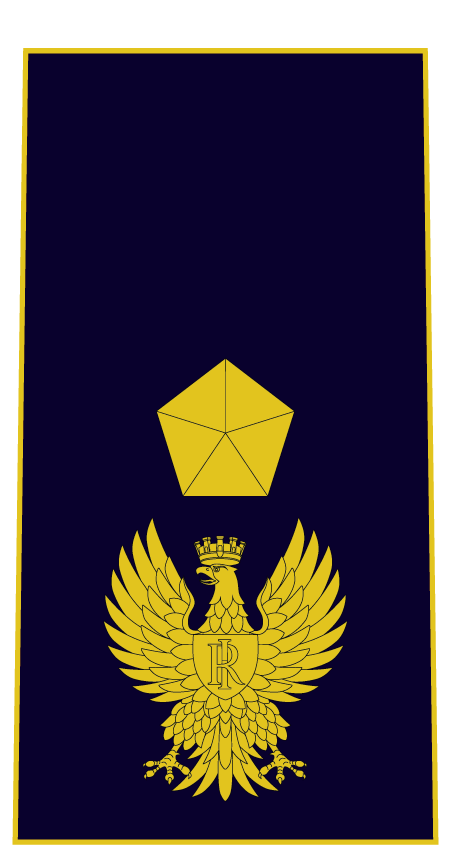
| Police Executive | | | Police Commissioners | | | | | Police Inspectors |
|---|---|---|---|---|---|---|---|---|---|---|---|---|---|
| Dirigente generale di pubblica sicurezza | Dirigente superiore | Primo dirigente | Vice questore | Vice questore aggiunto | Commissario capo | Commissario | Vice commissario | Sostituto commissario coordinatore | Sostituto commissario | Ispettore superiore | Ispettore capo | Ispettore | Vice ispettore |
| OF-7 | OF-6 | OF-5 | OF-4 | OF-3 | OF-2 | OF-1 | | OR-9 | | | OR-8 |

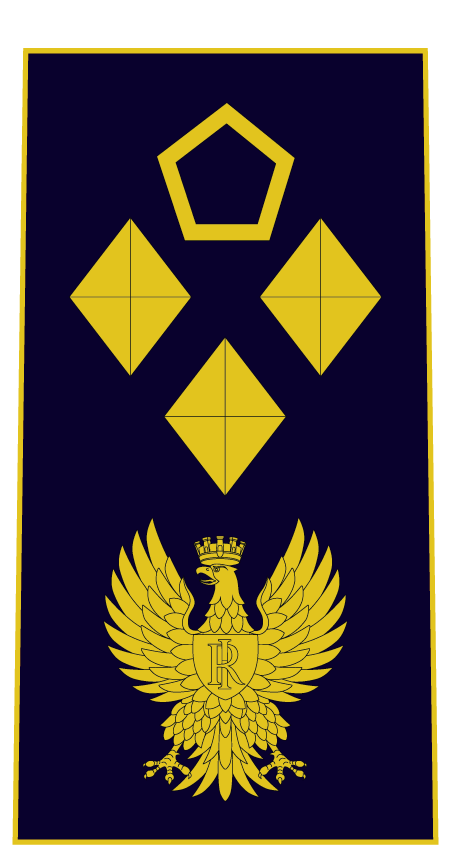
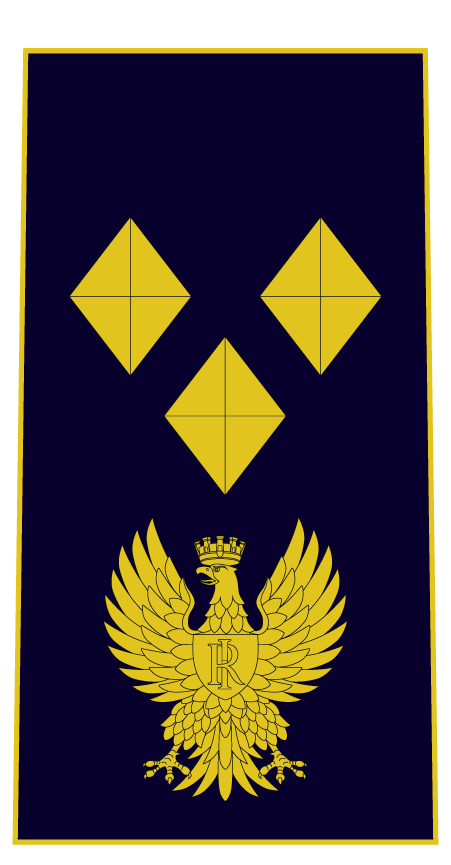
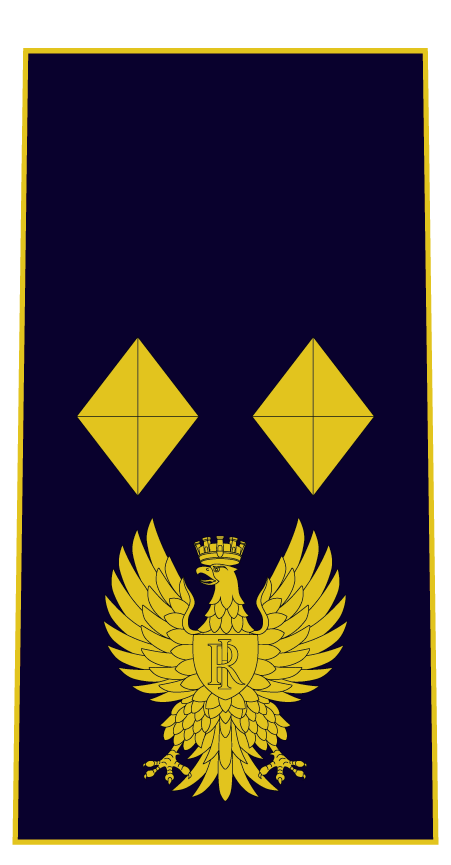
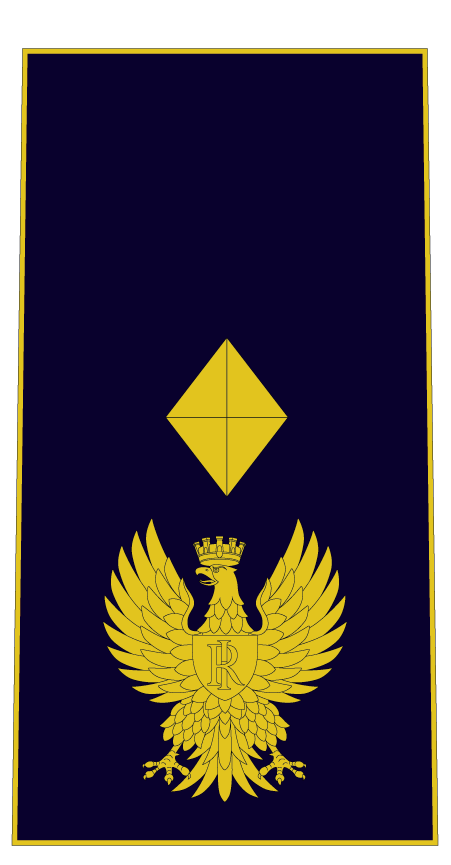
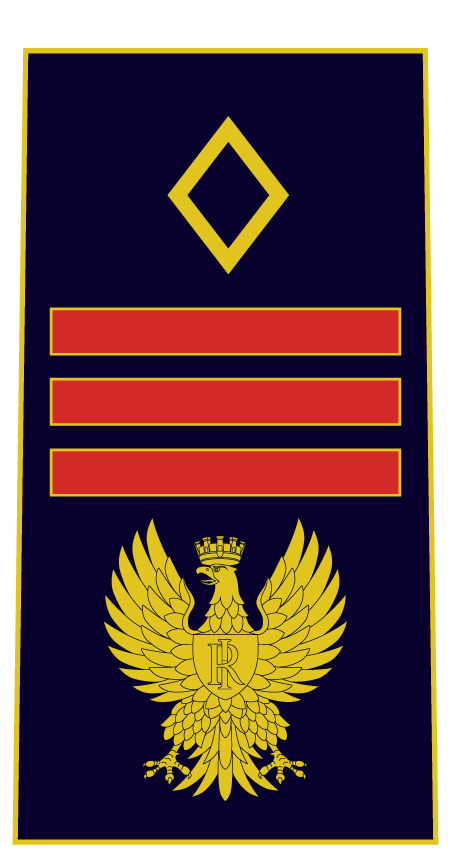
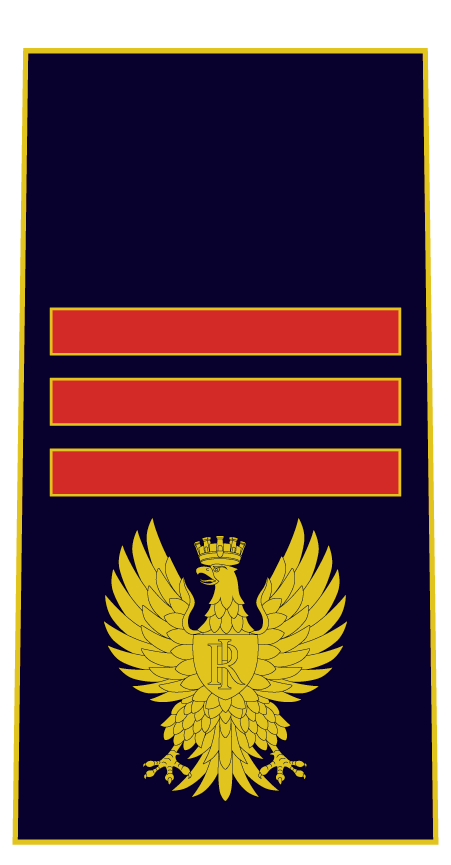
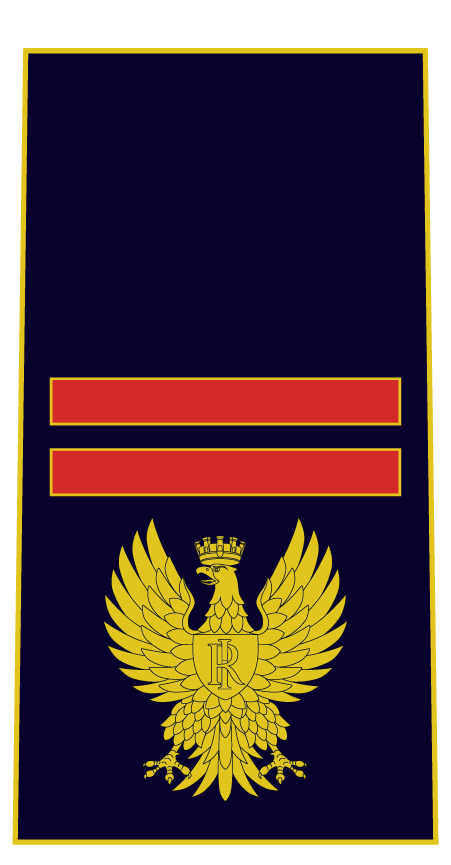
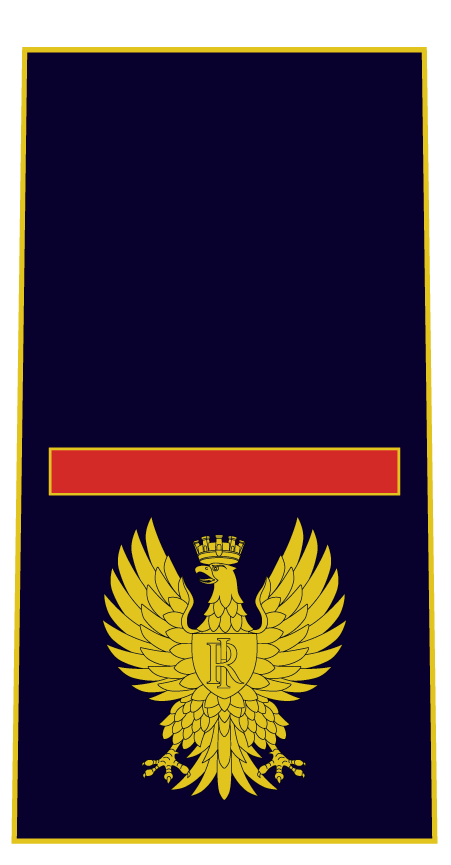
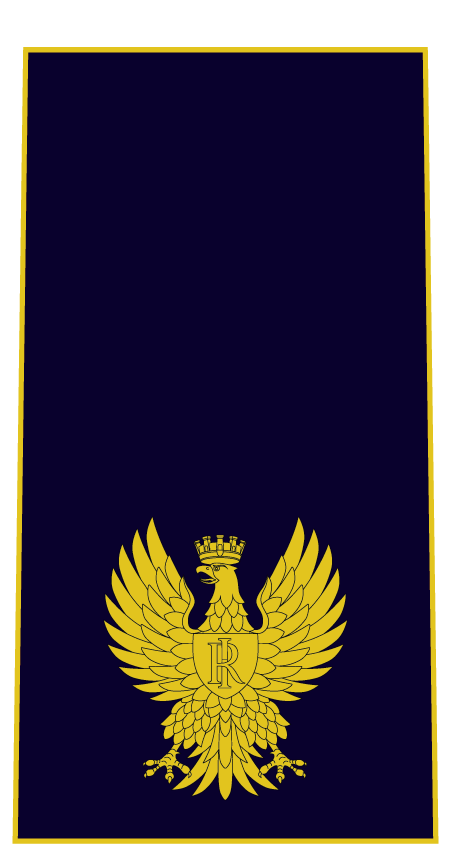
| Police Sergeants | | | | Police Constables |
|---|---|---|---|---|---|---|---|---|
| Sovrintendente capo coordinatore | Sovrintendente capo | Sovrintendente | Vice sovrintendente | Assistente capo coordinatore | Assistente capo | Assistente | Agente scelto | Agente |
| OR-7 | | OR-6 | OR-5 | OR-4 |

== Carabinieri ==
Officers

| NATO code | OF-10 | OF-9 | OF-8 | | OF-7 | OF-6 | OF-5 | OF-4 | OF-3 | OF-2 | | OF-1 |
|---|---|---|---|---|---|---|---|---|---|---|---|---|---|
| Italian Carabinieri |
| Italian Carabinieri | | Comandante generale dell'arma dei carabinieri | Vicecomandante generale dell'arma dei carabinieri | Generale di corpo d'armata | Generale di divisione | Generale di brigata | Colonnello | Tenente colonnello | Maggiore | Primo capitano | Capitano | Tenente | Sottotenente |

Others

| NATO code | OR-9 | | | | OR-8 | | OR-7 | OR-6 | OR-5 | OR-4 | OR-3 | OR-2 | OR-1 |
|---|---|---|---|---|---|---|---|---|---|---|---|---|---|
| Italian Carabinieri | | | | | | | | | | Appuntato scelto q.s. / Appuntato scelto / Appuntato / Carabiniere scelto / Carabiniere |
| Italian Carabinieri | Primo luogotenente c.s. s.u.p.s | Luogotenente s.u.p.s. | Primo Maresciallo | Maresciallo Capo | Maresciallo Ordinario | Maresciallo | Brigadiere capo q.s. | Brigadiere capo | Vicebrigadiere | Appuntato scelto q.s. / Appuntato scelto / Appuntato / Carabiniere scelto / Carabiniere |

== Guardia di Finanza ==
Officers

There are about 3,250 officers in the Guardia di Finanza. Officer cadets for the general and aeronaval branches are recruited through competitive examinations open to Italian citizens, not over 22 years of age, with a high school diploma giving access to university studies. Officer cadets for the technical and logistic branches need a bachelor or master's degree, and to be under the age of 32. Officer cadets for the general and aeronaval branches are trained during three years undergraduate studies at the Accademia della Guardia di Finanza at the campus in Bergamo, followed by two years graduate studies at the campus in Rome. The successful cadets graduate as First Lieutenants with a master's degree in Economic and Financial Security Sciences.

| NATO code | OF-10 | OF-9 | OF-8 | | OF-7 | OF-6 | OF-5 | OF-4 | OF-3 | OF-2 | | OF-1 |
|---|---|---|---|---|---|---|---|---|---|---|---|---|---|
| Italy |
| Italy | | Comandante generale della Guardia di finanza^{1} | Vicecomandante generale della Guardia di finanza^{2} | Generale di corpo d'armata | Generale di divisione | Generale di brigata | Colonnello | Tenente colonnello | Maggiore | Primo capitano | Capitano | Tenente | Sottotenente |
| Italy | | Corps commanding general | Deputy corps commanding general | Corps general | Divisional general | Brigade general | Colonel | Lieutenant colonel | Major | First captain | Captain | Lieutenant | Sub-lieutenant |
Notes:
^{1} The duty of "comandante generale della Guardia di finanza" (corps commanding general) is assigned to a single "generale di corpo d'armata" (corps general).
^{2} The duty of "vicecomandante generale della Guardia di finanza" (deputy corps commanding general) is assigned to a single "generale di corpo d'armata" (corps general).

Non-commissioned officers

There are 24,000 inspectors in the Guardia di Finanza. Participation in the competition for the recruitment of inspectors in the general and naval branches is open to Italian citizens aged between 18 and 26 years, having a diploma of secondary school giving access to university studies. Inspector cadets attend the Scuola ispettori e sovrintendenti della Guardia di Finanza in L'Aquila for three years, at the same time studying at the local university, finally graduating with a bachelor's degree in business law and appointment as warrant officers. Inspectors in the naval branch continue with a year at the nautical school in Gaeta. There are 13,500 superintendents in the Guardia di Finanza. Superintendents are recruited through promotion from the ranks of the senior agents. They are trained at a three-months course at the Scuola ispettori e sovrintendenti della Guardia di Finanza in L'Aquila. There are 28,000 appointees (senior agents) and agents in the Guardia di Finanza. Competition for appointments as agents trainee is open for Italian citizens with one year's enlistment in the Italian defence forces. Recruits are given basic training at either the Recruit School in Bari or the Alpine School in Predazzo.

| NATO Code | OR-9 | | | OR-8 | | OR-7 | OR-6 | OR-5 | OR-4 |
|---|---|---|---|---|---|---|---|---|---|---|---|---|
| epaulette |
| Italian rank name English rank name translation | luogotenente^{1} s.u.p.s. sub-lieutenant s.o.p.s. | maresciallo aiutante s.u.p.s.^{2} marshal adjutant s.o.p.s. | maresciallo capo chief marshal | maresciallo ordinario ordinary marshal | maresciallo marshal | brigadiere capo chief brigadier | brigadiere brigadier | vice brigadiere vice-brigadier | appuntato scelto chosen appointee | appuntato appointee | finanziere scelto chosen financier | finanziere^{3} financier |
Notes:^{1} The duty of a sostituto ufficiale di pubblica sicurezza luogotenente (substitute officer of public security sub-lieutenant) is not a rank but a position (or function) attributed only to NCOs with the rank of "maresciallo aiutante" (marshal adjutant) with at least 15 years of experience in the rank.^{2} The title of "sostituto ufficiale di pubblica sicurezza" or "s.u.p.s." (substitute officer of public security – s.o.p.s.) is not a rank but a position attributed only to NCOs with the rank of "maresciallo aiutante".^{3} A simple financier does not wear rank insignia

== State Forestry Corps ==
The ranks of the former State Forestry Corps.

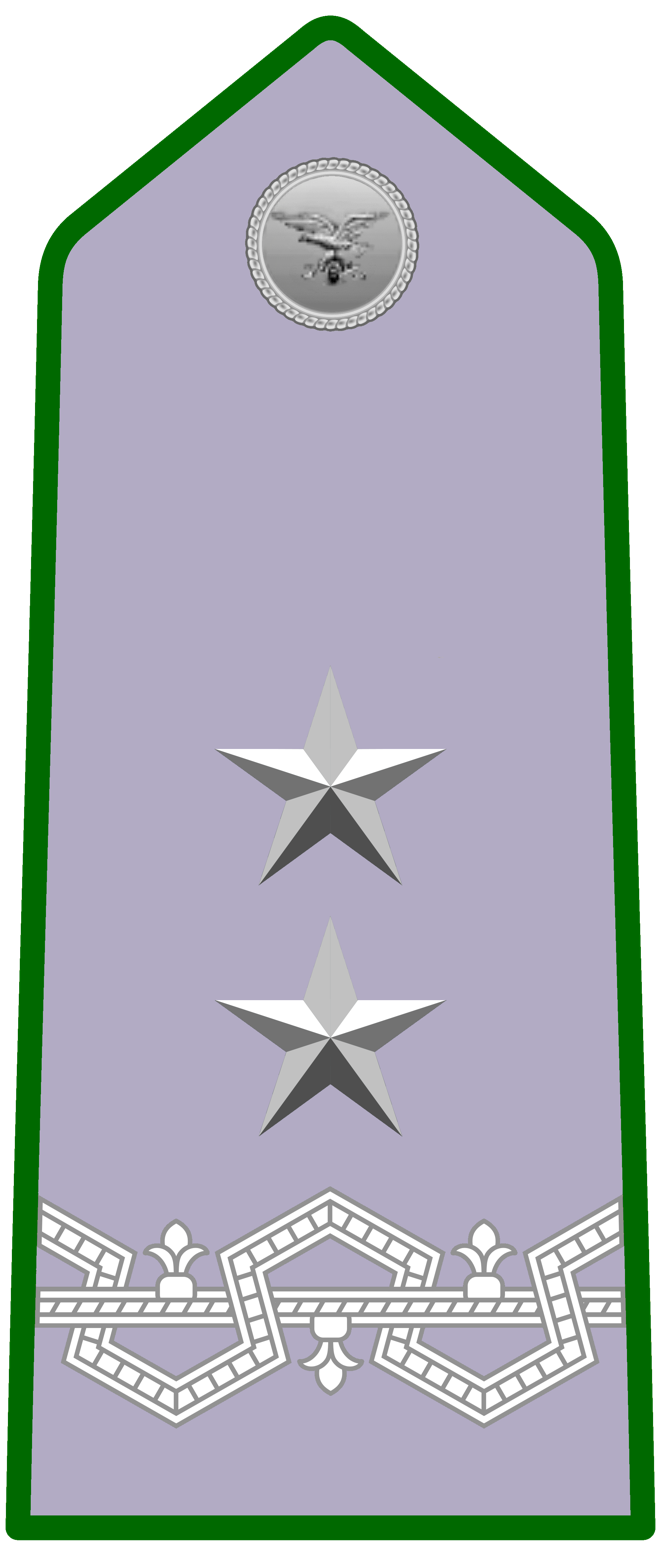
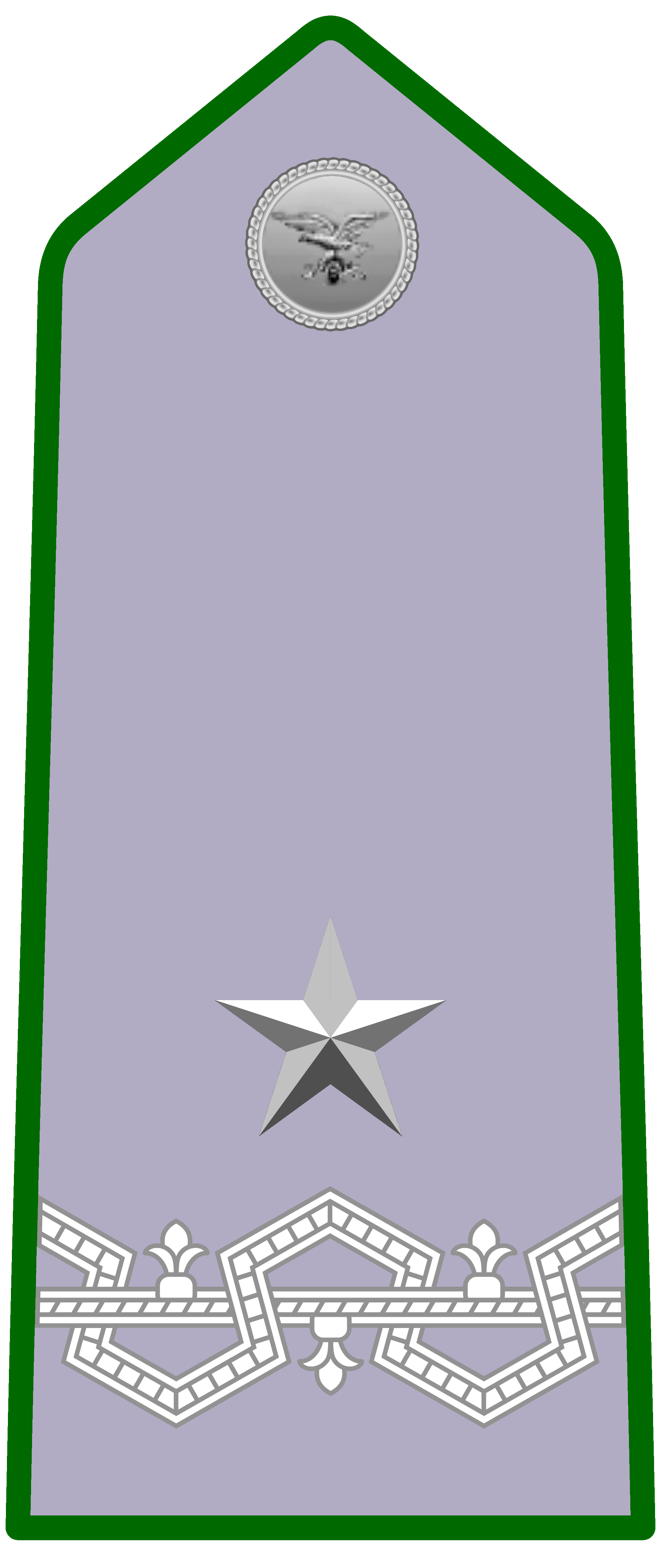
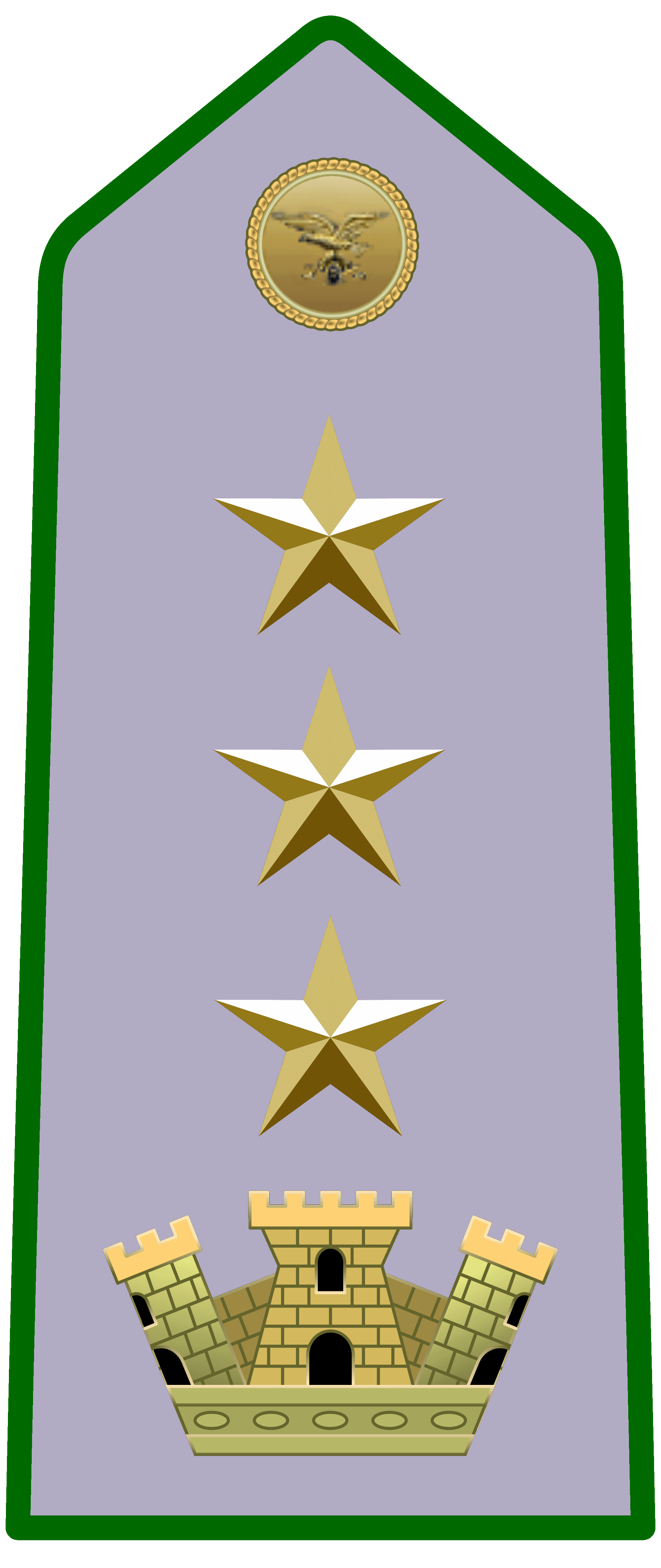
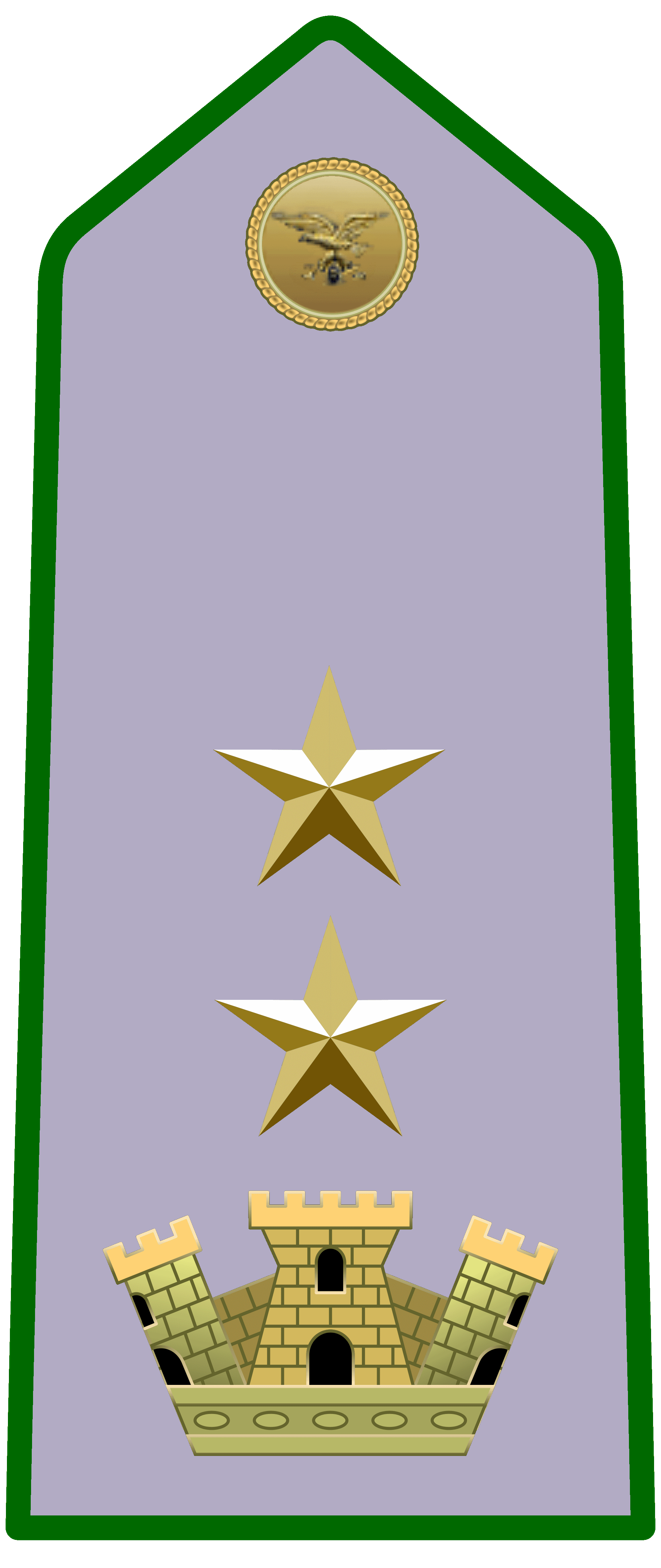
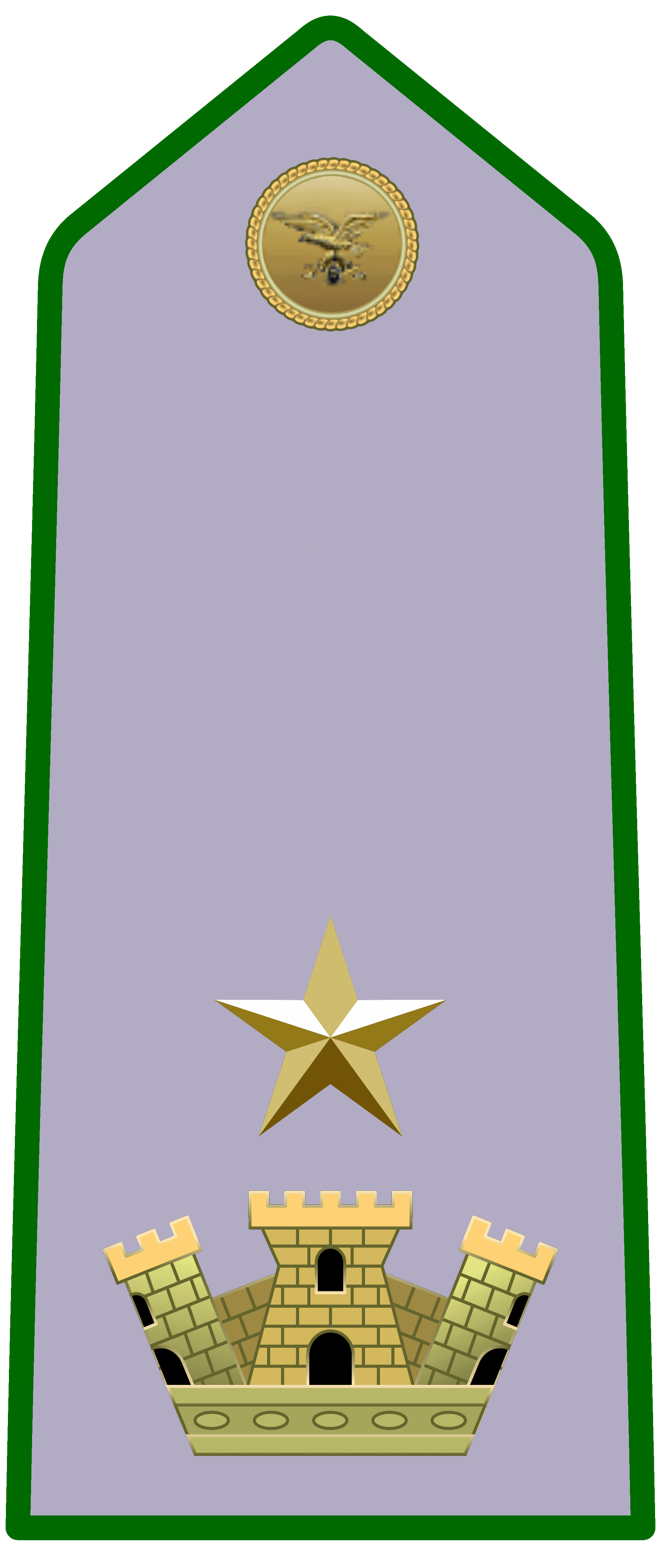
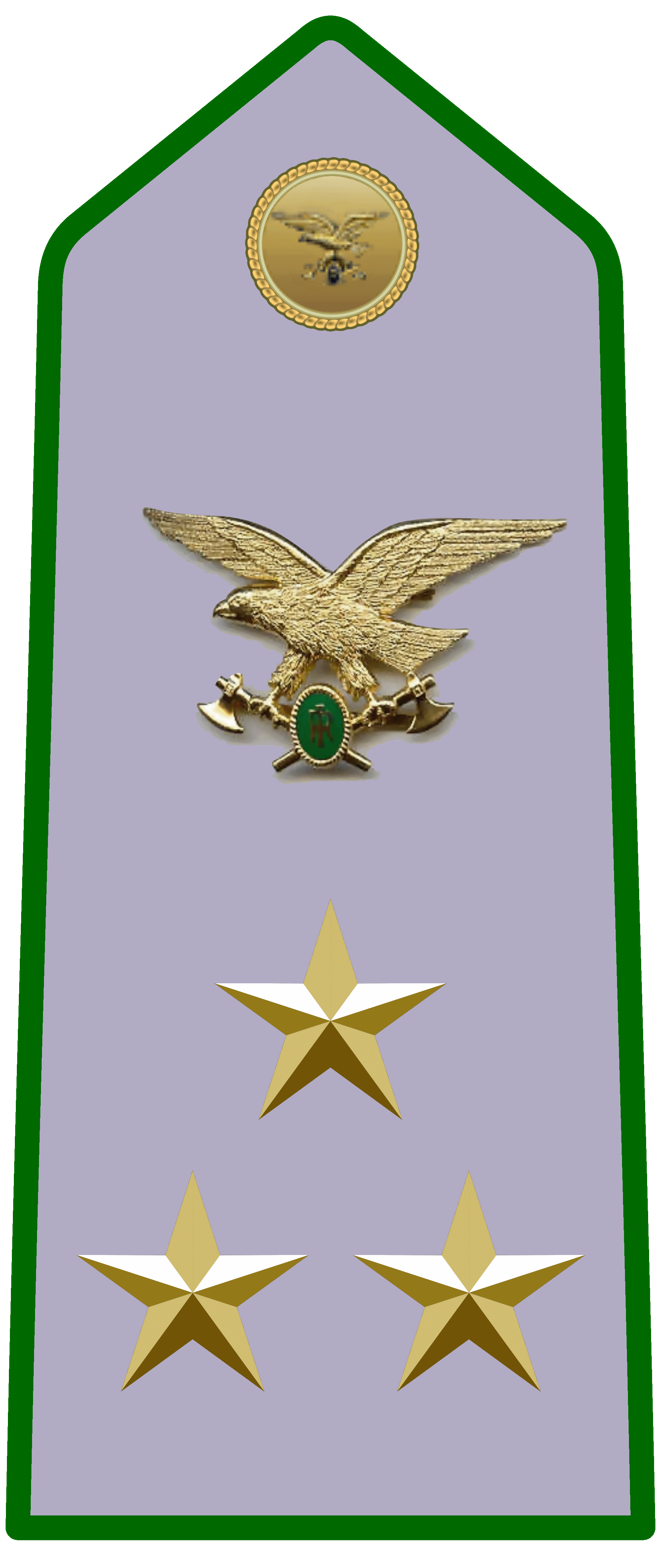
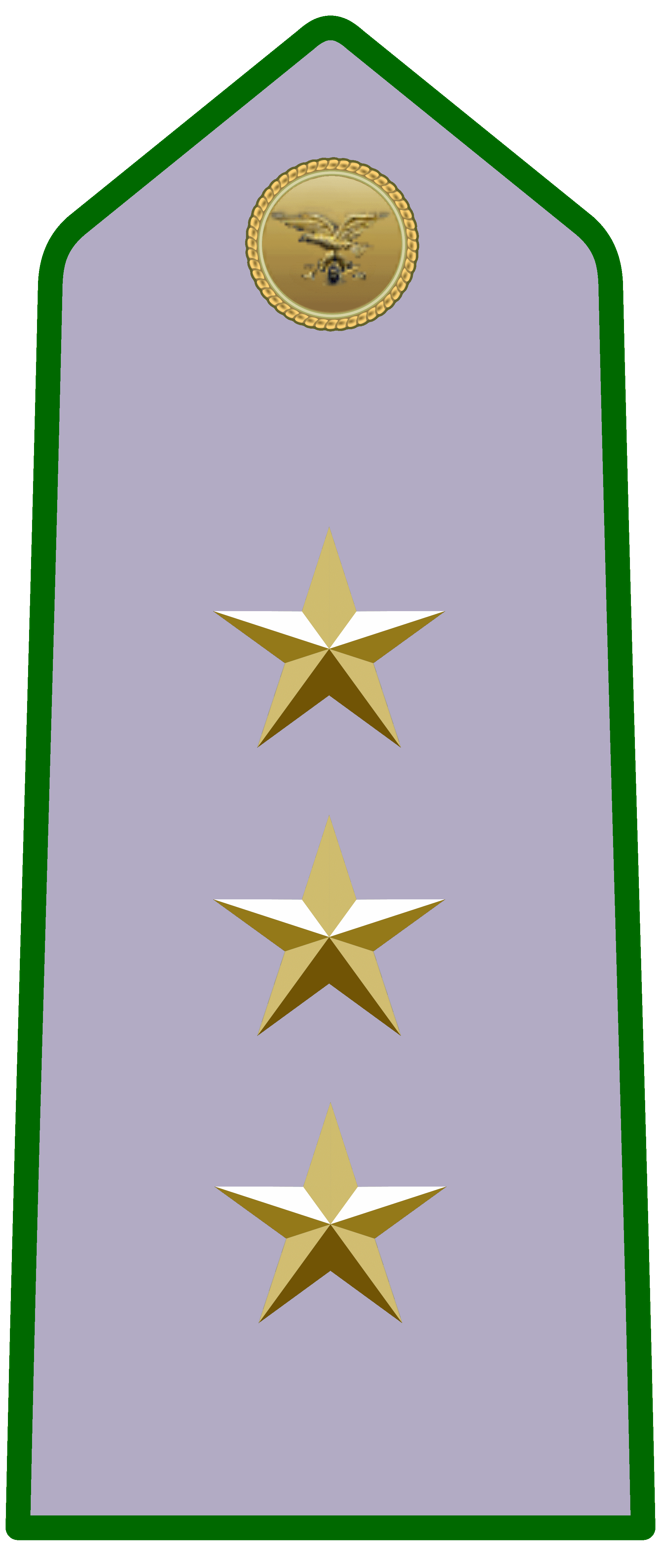
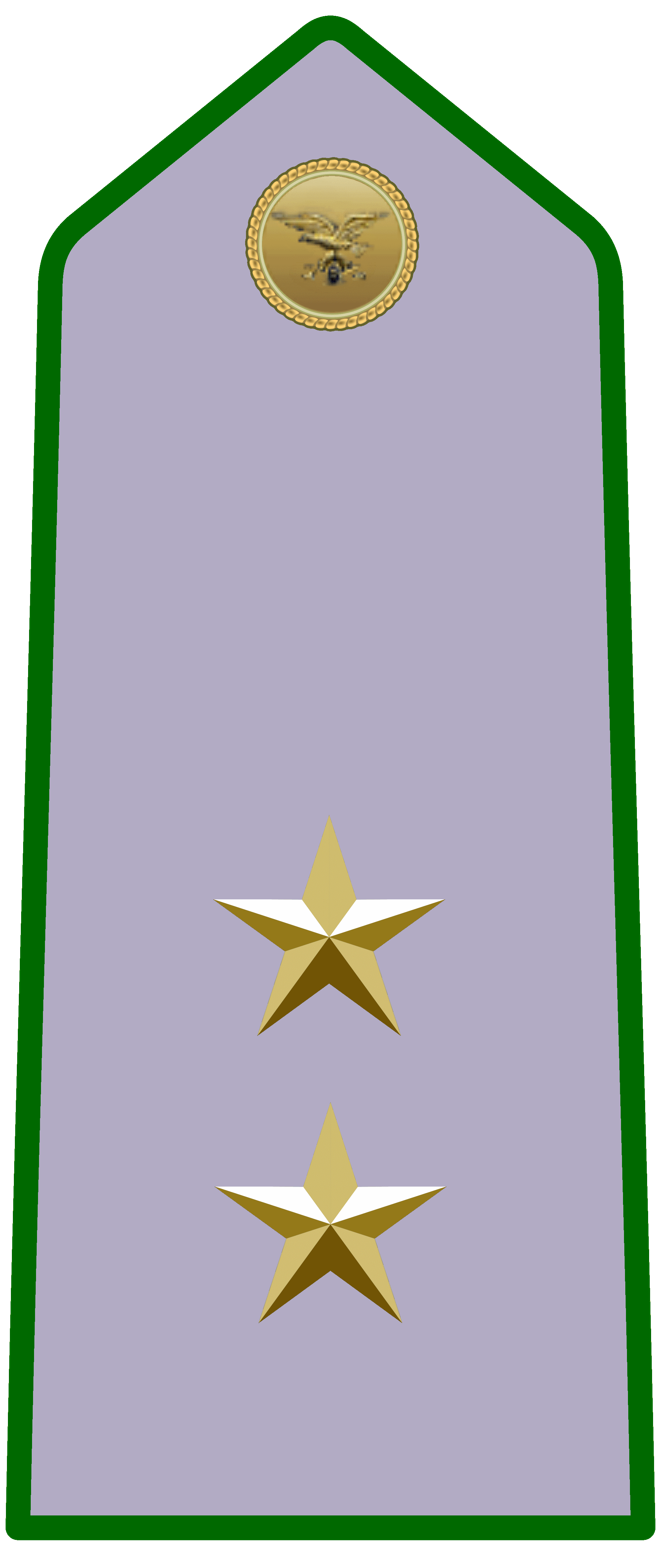
| NATO code | OF-10 | OF-9 | OF-8 | OF-7 | OF-6 | OF-5 | OF-4 | OF-3 | OF-2 | | OF-1 |
|---|---|---|---|---|---|---|---|---|---|---|---|
| Corpo forestale dello Stato |
| Corpo forestale dello Stato | | | | Dirigente generale | Dirigente superiore | Primo dirigente | Vice questore aggiunto forestale | Commissario capo forestale | Commissario forestale (direct entry trainee) | Commissario forestale (internal recruitment trainee) | Vice commissario (internal recruitment trainee) |

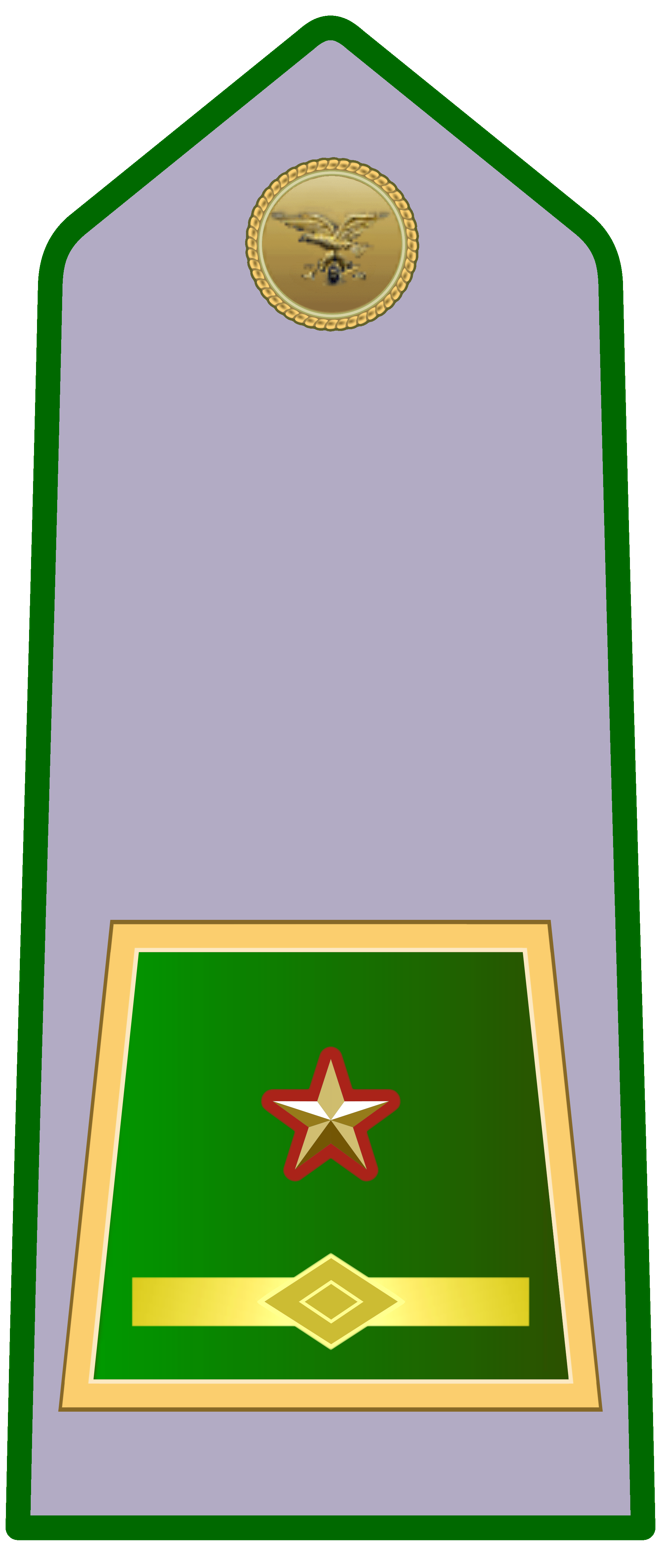
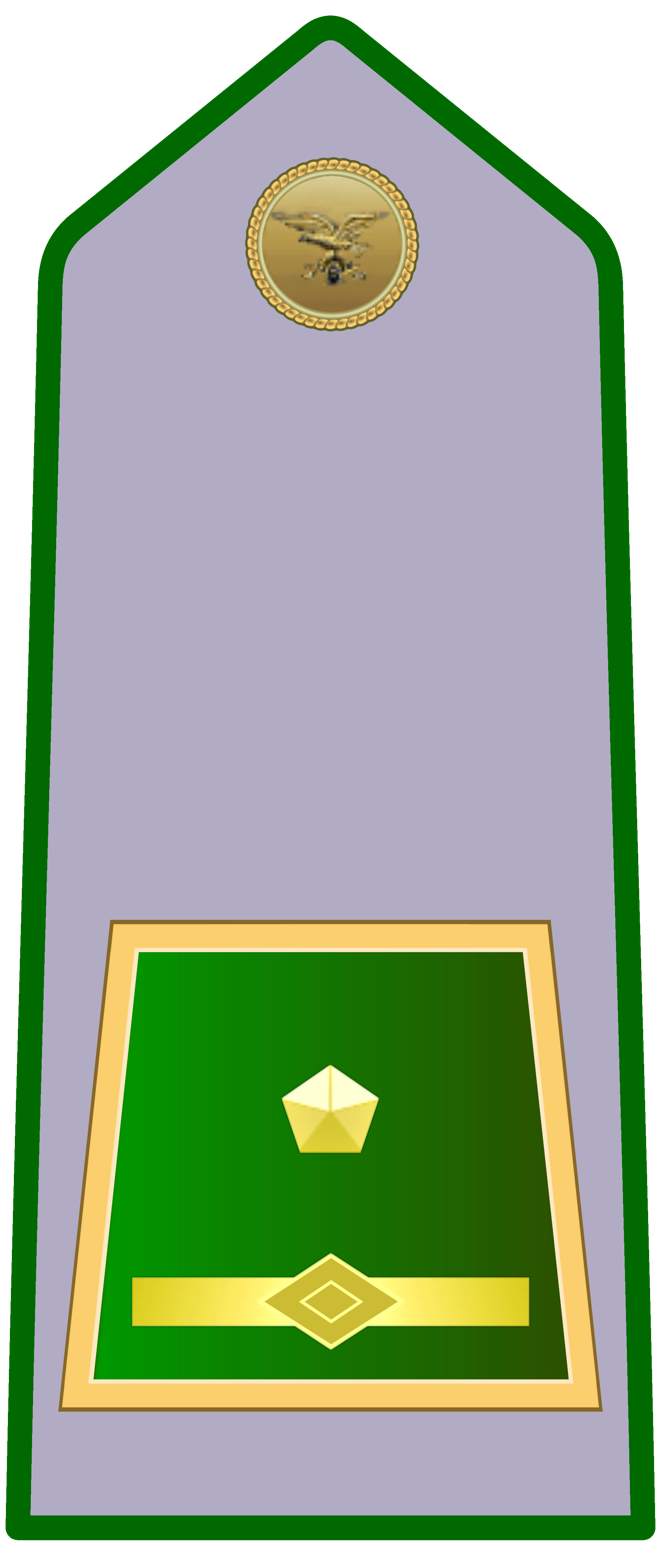
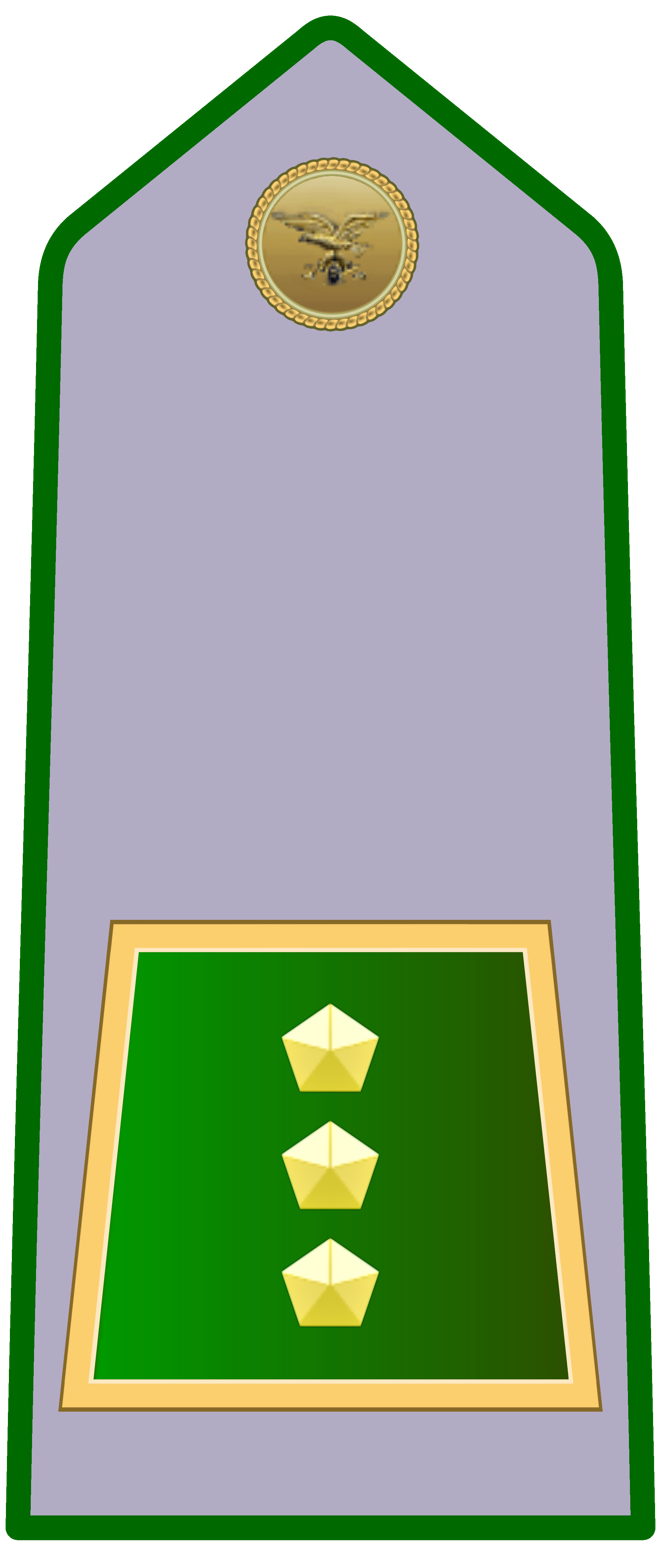
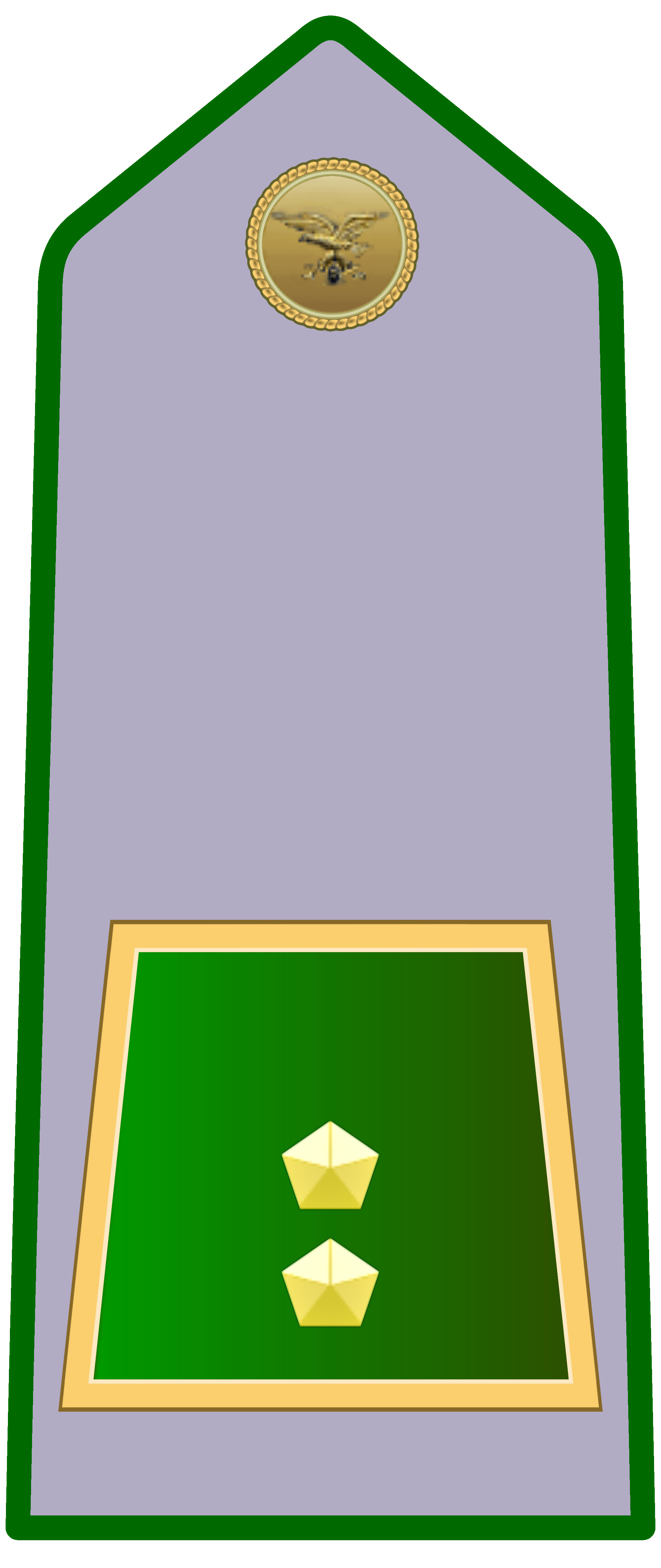
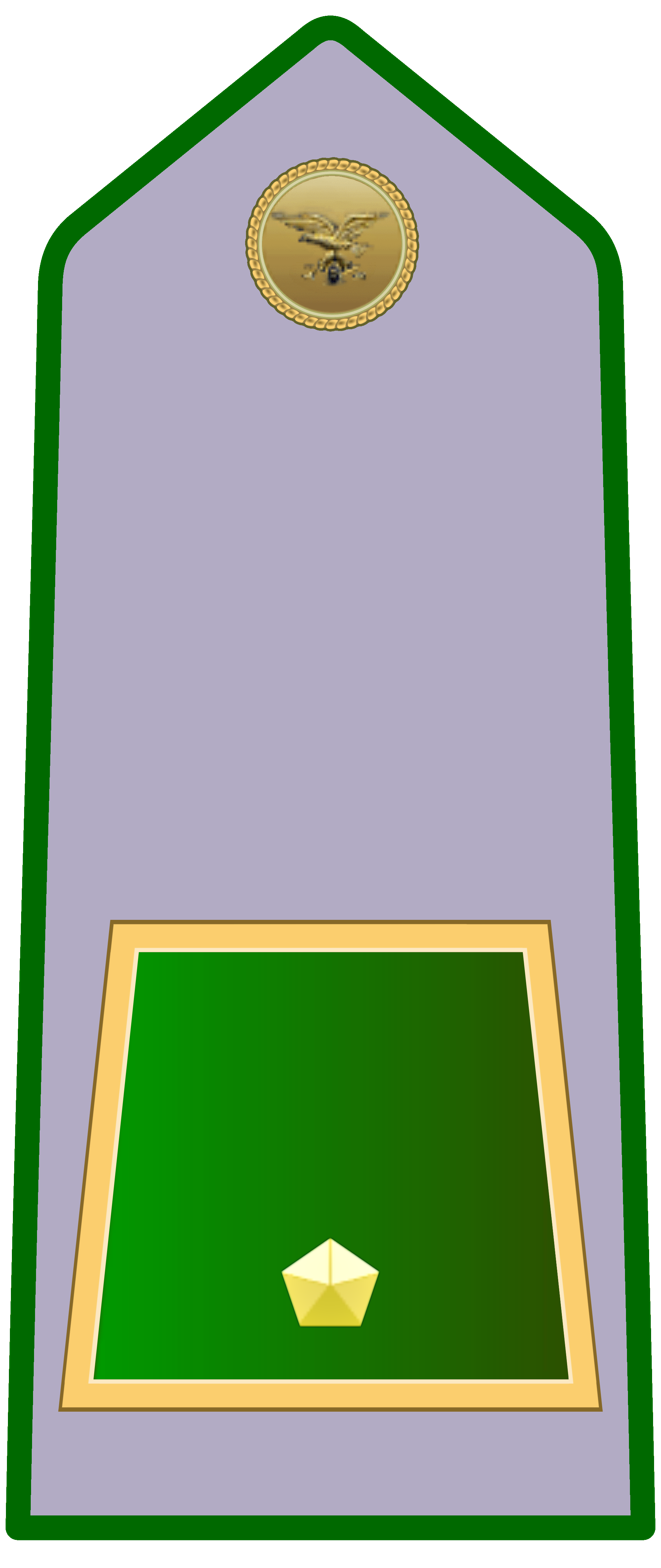
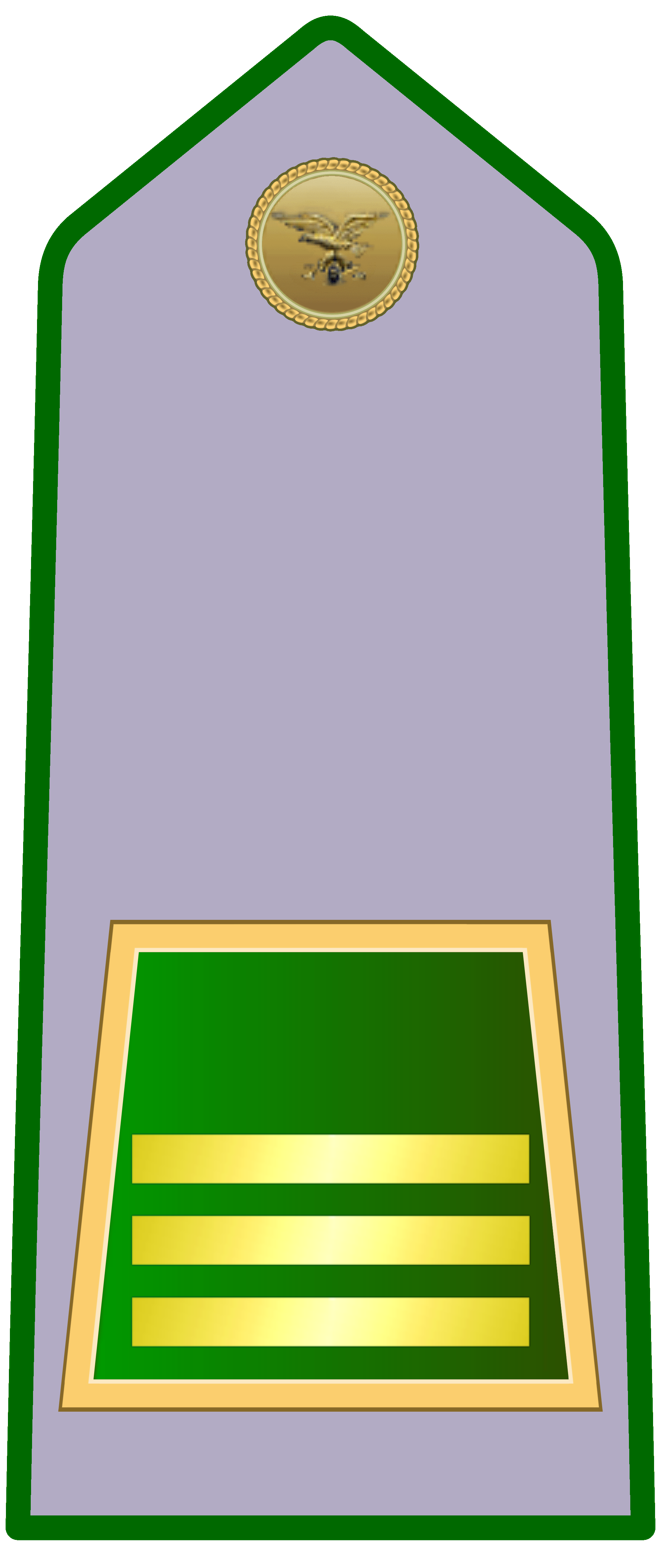
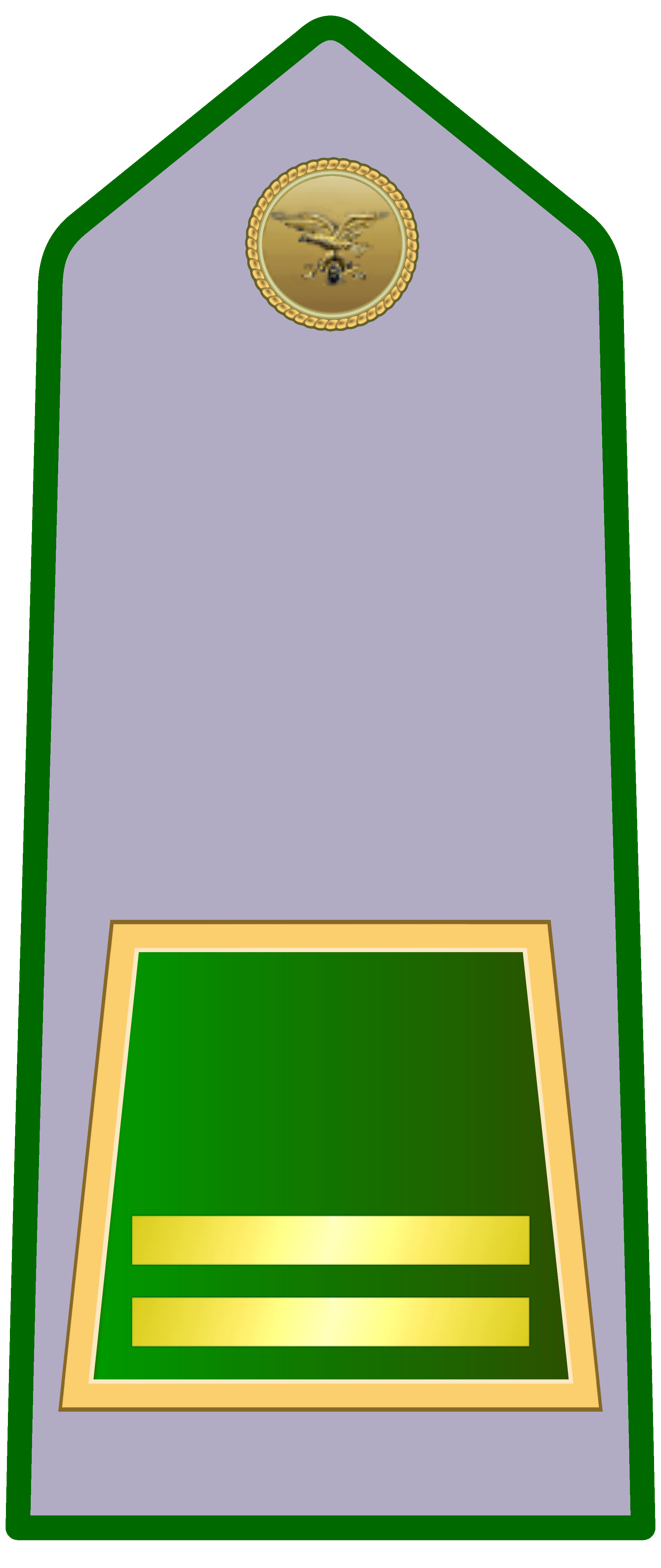
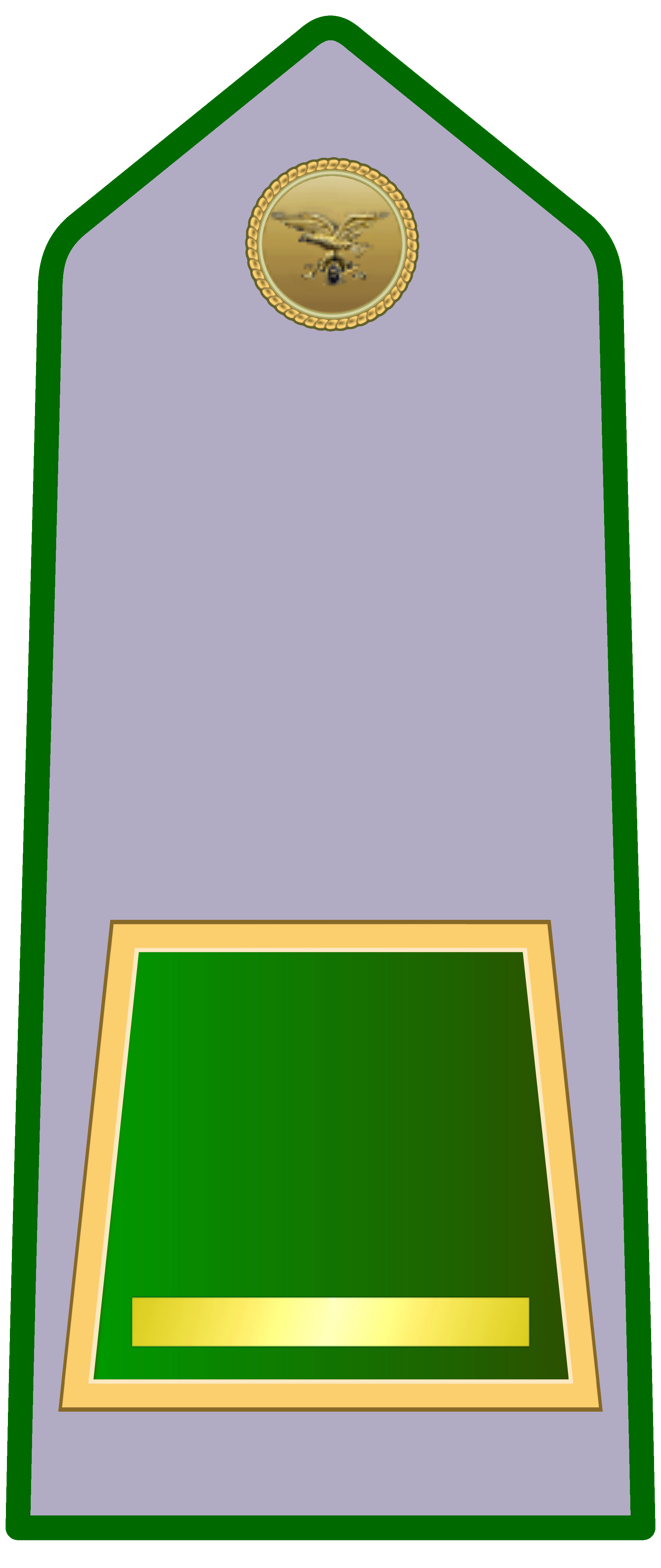
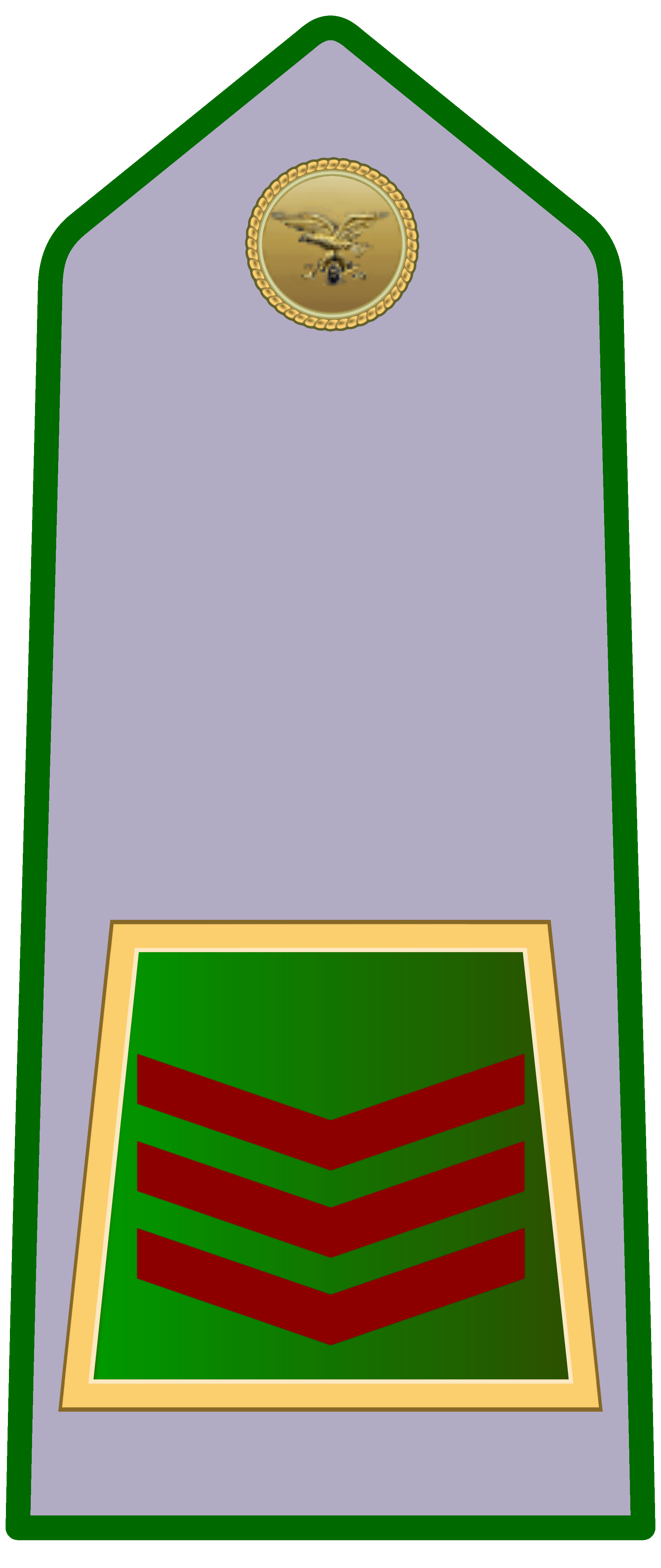
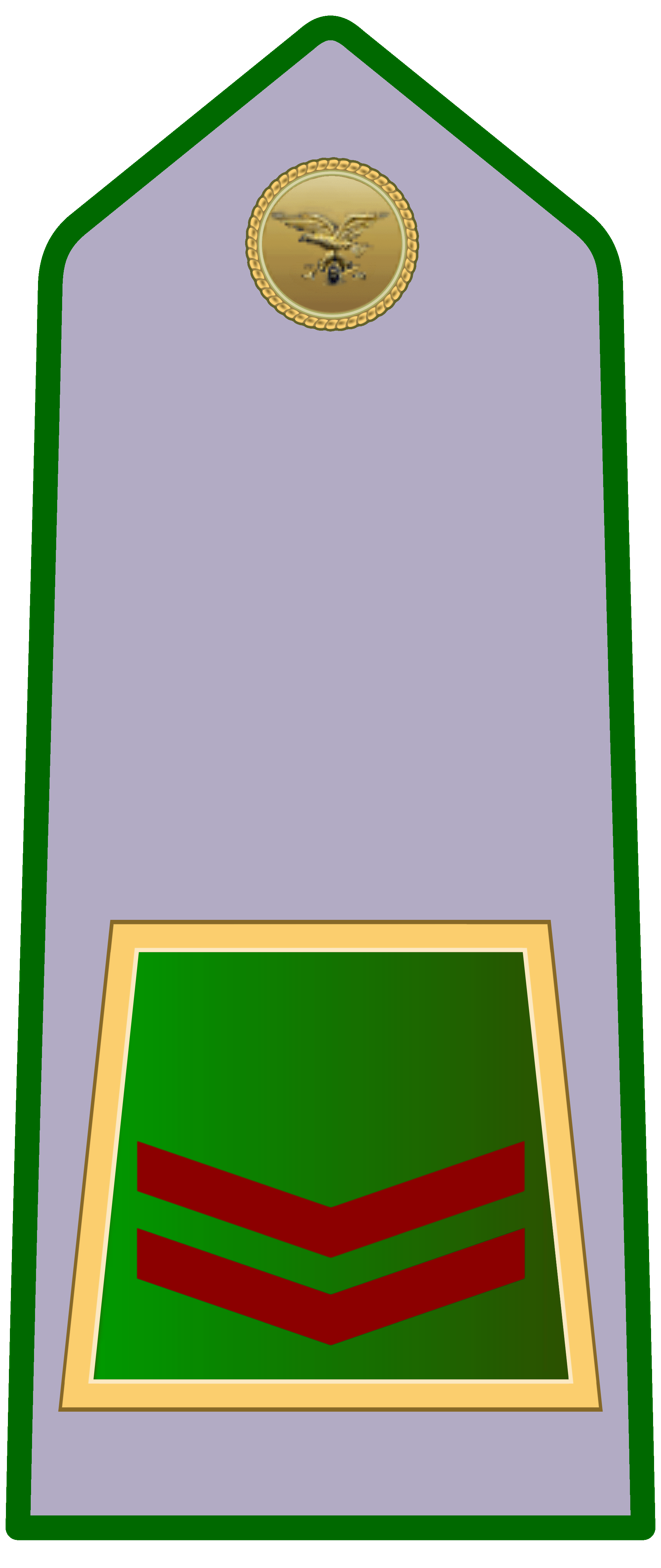
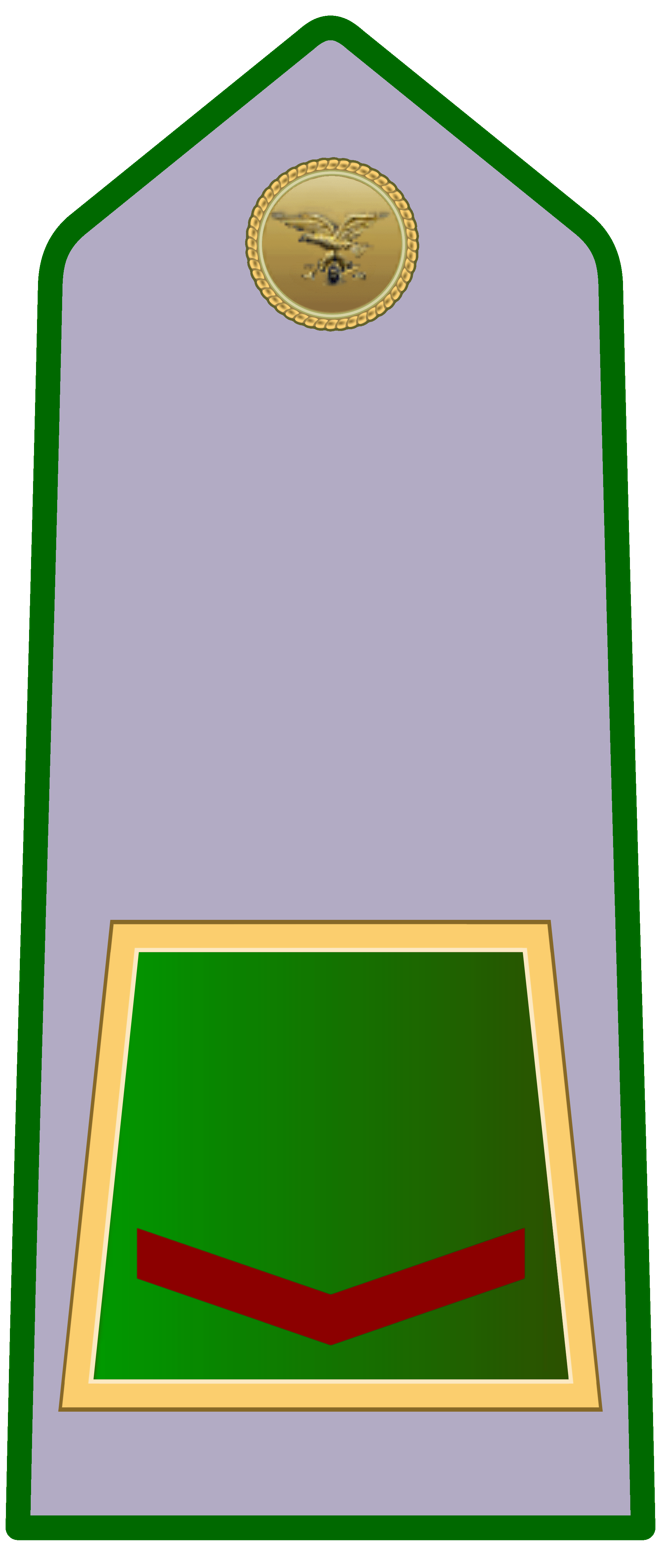
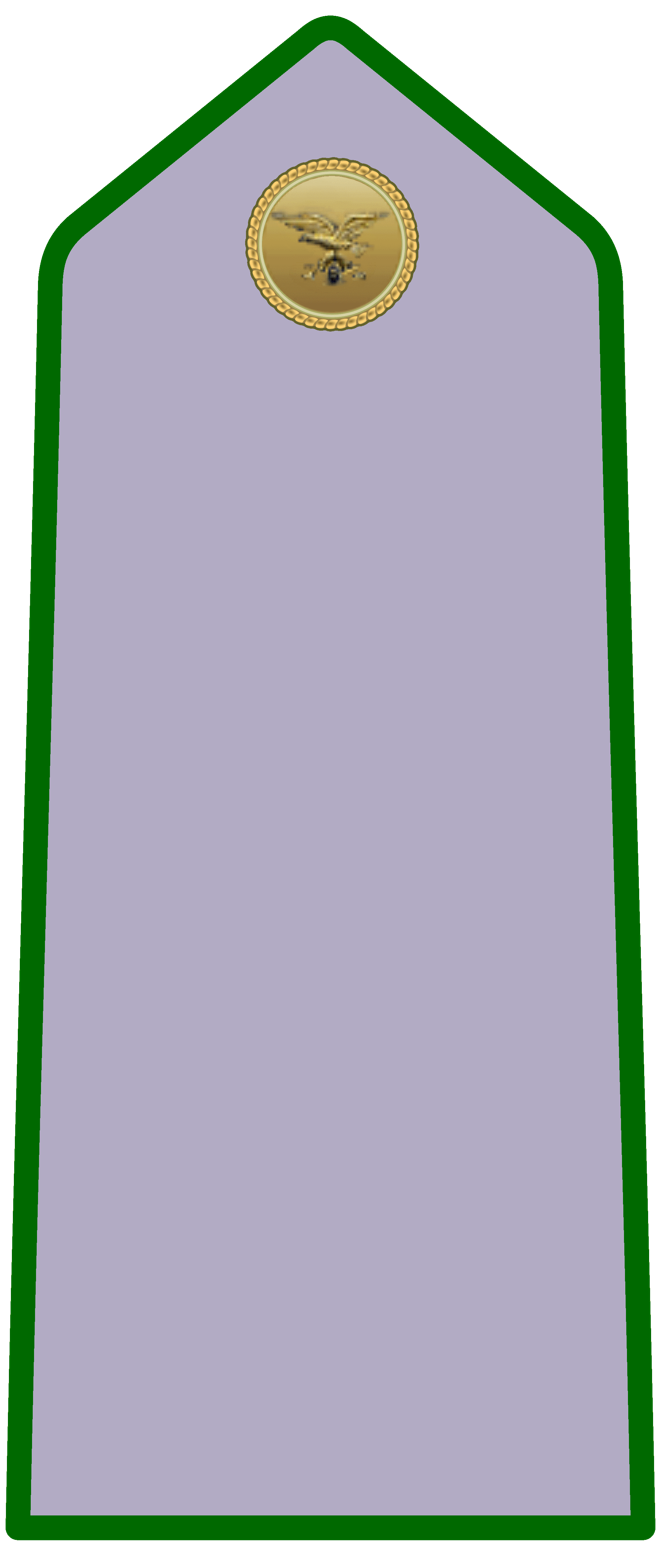
| NATO code | OR-9 | | | OR-8 | | OR-7 | OR-6 | OR-5 | OR-4 | | | | OR-3 | OR-2 | OR-1 |
|---|---|---|---|---|---|---|---|---|---|---|---|---|---|---|---|
| Corpo forestale dello Stato |
| Corpo forestale dello Stato | Ispettore superiore scelto | Ispettore superiore | Ispettore capo | Ispettore | Vice ispettore | Sovrintendente capo | Sovrintendente | Vice sovrintendente | Assistente capo | Assistente | Agente scelto | Agente |

== See also ==
- Police ranks of France
- Police ranks of Poland
- Police ranks of Spain
- Italian local police ranks
