= Police ranks of Spain =

The Police ranks of Spanish police officers denote the position of a given officer in the police hierarchy in Spanish police forces.

== National ==
=== Guardia civil ===
NATO code	OF-10	OF-9	OF-8	OF-7	OF-6	OF-5	OF-4	OF-3	OF-2	OF-1
(Spain) Spanish Civil Guard
(Spain) Spanish Civil Guard			Teniente general	General de división	General de brigada	Coronel	Teniente coronel	Comandante	Capitán	Teniente	Alférez

NATO code	OR-9		OR-8	OR-7	OR-6	OR-5	OR-4	OR-3	OR-2	OR-1
(Spain) Spanish Civil Guard
(Spain) Spanish Civil Guard	Suboficial mayor	Subteniente	Brigada	Sargento primero	Sargento	Cabo mayor	Cabo primero	Cabo	Guardia Civil de Primera (Note: Rank in abeyance)	Guardia Civil

(*) Constable with the rank "Guardia Civil" with 6 years of service obtain statuts of non-commissioned officer (OR-6). Cabo, Cabo primero and Cabo mayor obtain statuts of non-commissioned officer (OR-6) automatically when agents promote to the rank of Corporal. "Royal Decree 1970/1983, of June 22, on the consideration of Non-Commissioned Officers to the Troop Classes of the Civil Guard"

Rank Guardia Civil to Cabo Mayor, in Military Police missions under the command of the Ministry of Defense, their rank will be equivalent to the first rank of non-commissioned official (OR-6). "Law 29/2014, of November 28, on the Civil Guard Personnel Regime" A Civil Guard participates in a mission abroad, and at the suggestion of the Minister of Defense, may eventually hold a higher rank.

=== Cuerpo Nacional de Policía ===
	Superior grades				Superior		Executive		Deputy inspector	Basic		Student
National Police Corps 2014–Present
National Police Corps 2014–Present	Director adjunto operativo	Subdirector general	Comisario general/ jefe de división	Jefe superior	Comisario principal	Comisario	Inspector jefe	Inspector	Subinspector	Oficial de policía	Policía	Inspector alumno en prácticas	Inspector alumno de 2º año	Inspector alumno de 1º año	Policía en prácticas	Policía alumno

Superior

Executive

Deputy Inspector

Basic

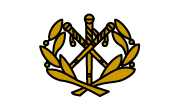
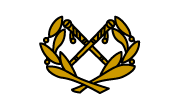
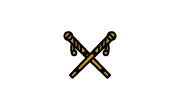
Categories	Superior Grades			Superior		Executive		Deputy Inspector	Basic		Student
National Police Corps; 1986-2014
National Police Corps; 1986-2014	DAO/Subdirector General	Comisario General/Jefe de División	Jefe Superior	Comisario Principal	Comisario	Inspector Jefe	Inspector	Subinspector	Oficial de Policía	Policía	Inspector Alumno de 2º año	Inspector Alumno de 1º año	Policía en Prácticas

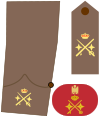
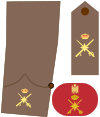
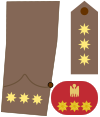
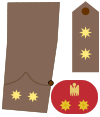
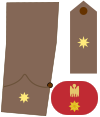
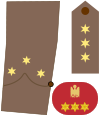
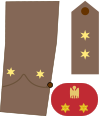
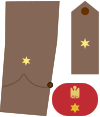
National Police Corps (1978-1986)
National Police Corps (1978-1986)	General de División (Commissioner)	General de Brigada (Assistant Commissioner)	Coronel (Chief Superintendent)	Teniente Coronel (Superintendent)	Comandante	Capitán	Teniente	Alférez (Station Inspector)

National Police Corps
(1978-1986)

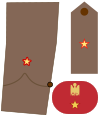

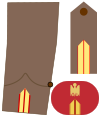

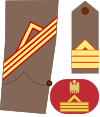

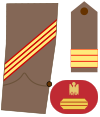

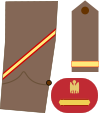

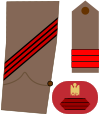

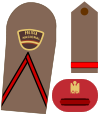

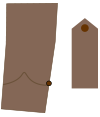

Subteniente
(Sub-inspector)
Brigada
(Head Constable)
Sargento Primero
(Staff Sergeant)
Sargento
(Sergeant)
Cabo Primero
(Corporal)
Cabo
(Lance Corporal)
Policía de Primera
(Senior Constable)
Policía
(Policeman,
Constable)

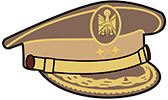
(General de división)
General officers

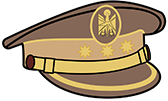
(Coronel)
Senior officers

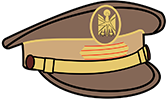
(Sargento)
Officers and NCOs

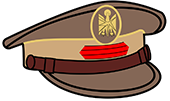
(Cabo)
Enlisted

== Autonomous Communities ==
=== Ertzaintza ===
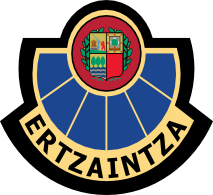
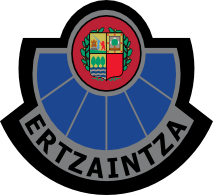
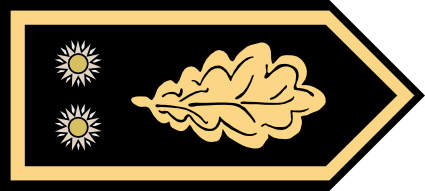
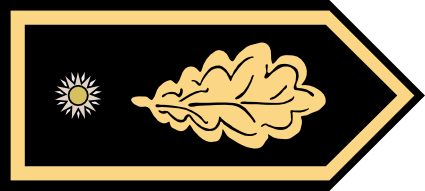
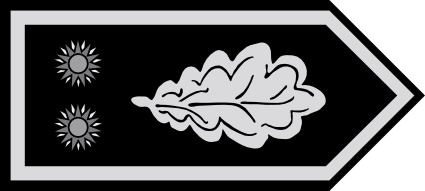
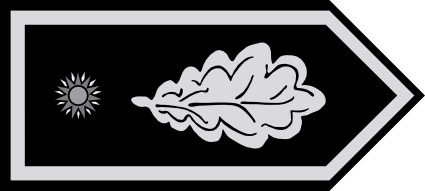
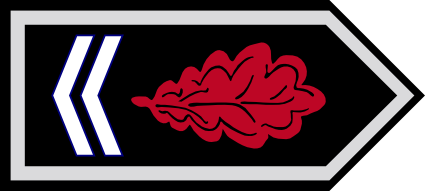
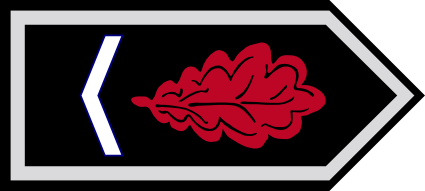
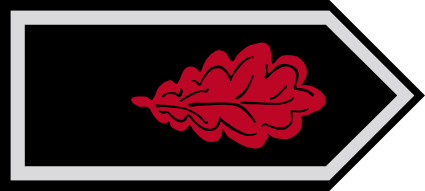
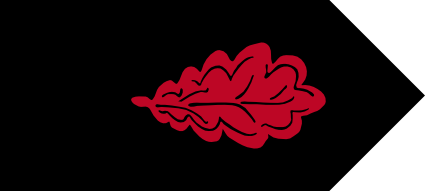
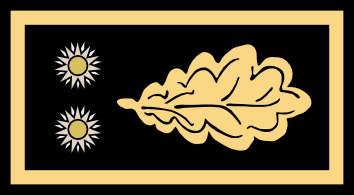
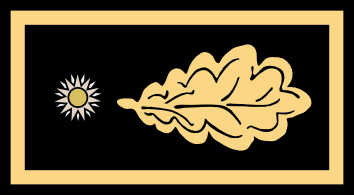
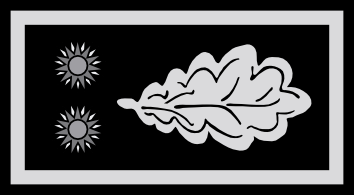
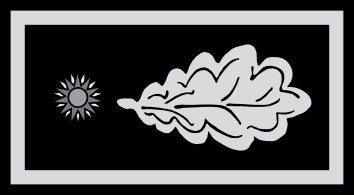
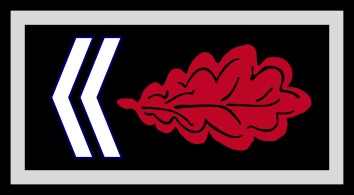
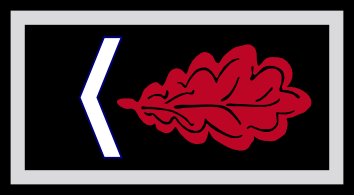
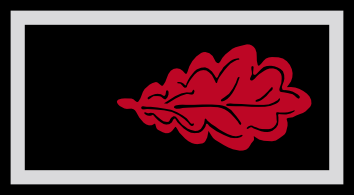
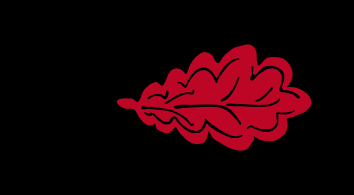
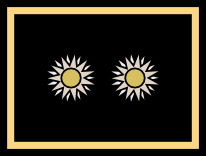
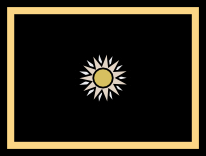
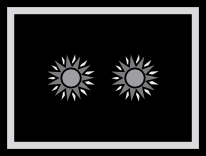
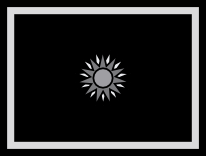
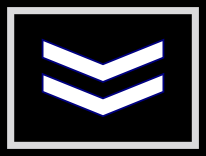
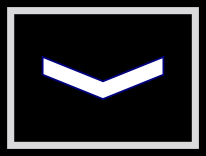
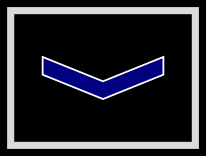
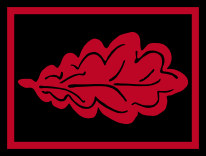
Police Ranks		Superior Grade		Executive Grade		Inspection Grade		Basic Grade
	Cap Emblem	Escala Superior		Escala Básica, Inspección y Ejecutiva
	Rigid Shoulder Plate	Intendenteburua / Superintendente	Intendentea / Intendente	Komisarioa / Comisario	Komisariondokoa / Subcomisario	Ofiziala / Oficial	Ofizialaondokoa / Suboficial	Lehenengoa agentea / Agente 1º	Agentea / Agente
	Flexible Shoulder Plate	Intendenteburua / Superintendente	Intendentea / Intendente	Komisarioa / Comisario	Komisariondokoa / Subcomisario	Ofiziala / Oficial	Ofizialaondokoa / Suboficial	Lehenengoa agentea / Agente 1º	Agentea / Agente
	Rank Insignia	Intendenteburua / Superintendente	Intendentea / Intendente	Komisarioa / Comisario	Komisariondokoa / Subcomisario	Ofiziala / Oficial	Ofizialaondokoa / Suboficial	Lehenengoa agentea / Agente 1º	Agentea / Agente
	Basque	Intendenteburua	Intendentea	Komisarioa	Komisariondokoa	Ofiziala	Ofizialondokoa	Agente lehena	Agentea
	Spanish	Superintendente	Intendente	Comisario	Subcomisario	Oficial	Suboficial	Agente primero	Agente
	English	Superintendent	Intendent	Commissioner	Deputy Commissioner	Officer	Deputy Officer	Superior Agent	Agent

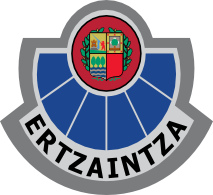
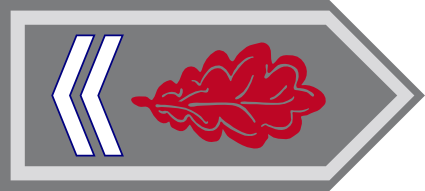
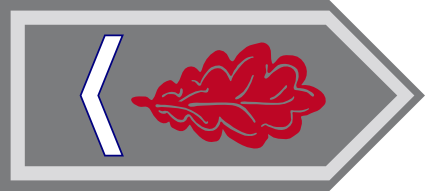
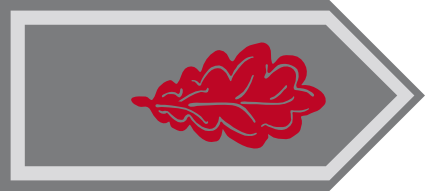
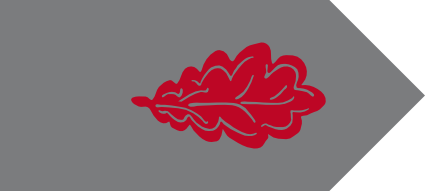
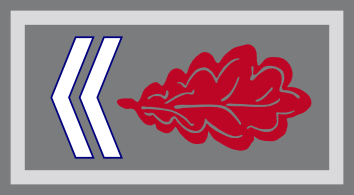
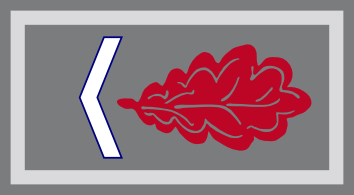
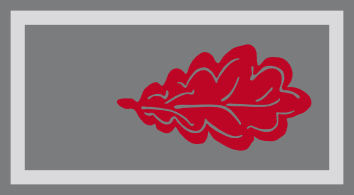
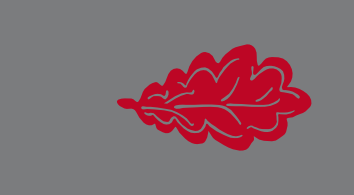
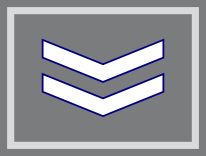
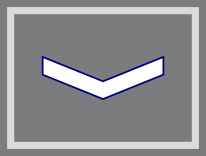
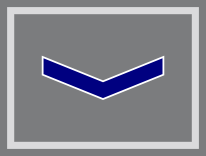
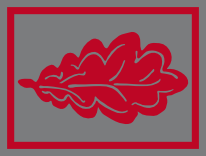
Police Ranks		Facultatives and Technicians Grade
	Cap Emblem	Escala Superior
	Rigid Shoulder Plate	Grupo A1	Grupo A2	Grupo C1	Grupo C2
	Flexible Shoulder Plate	Grupo A1	Grupo A2	Grupo C1	Grupo C2
	Rank Insignia	Grupo A1	Grupo A2	Grupo C1	Grupo C2
	Group	Group A1	Group A2	Group C1	Group C2

=== Mossos d'Esquadra ===
Ranks of the Mossos d'Esquadra
Police ranks	Superior grade			Executive grade	Intermediate grade		Basic grade	
Shoulder insignia								No insignia
Title	Major	Comissari	Intendent	Inspector	Sotsinspector	Sergent	Caporal	Mosso
English translation	Major	Commissioner	Intendent	Inspector	Lieutenant	Sergeant	Corporal	Constable

=== Policía Foral ===
Ranks of the Policía Foral
Insignia							no insignia
Spanish title	Jefe policía Foral	Comisario principal	Comisario	Inspector	Subinspector	Cabo	Agente Foral
Basque title	Foruzainburua	Komisario Nagusia	Komisarioa	Inspektorea	Inspektoreordea	Kaporala	Agentea
English translation	Foral police chief	Chief commissioner	Commissioner	Inspector	Sub-inspector	Corporal	Foral constable

=== Cuerpo General de La Policía Canaria ===
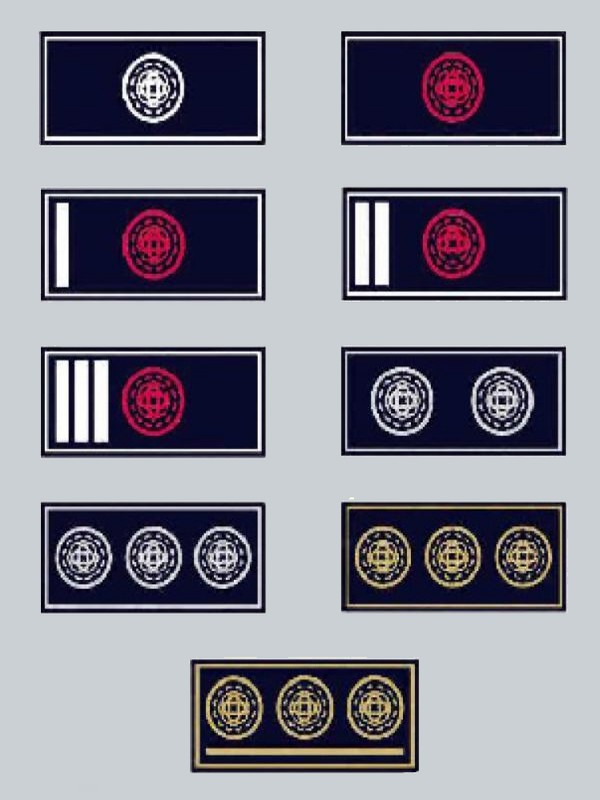
Polícia en prácticas (Police trainee) Polícia (Police officer) Oficial (Police sergeant) Subinspector (Police lieutenant) Inspector (Police captain) Subcomisario (Deputy police inspector) Comisario (Police inspector) Comisario principal (Assistant chief of police) Comisario principal jefe (Chief of police) Source:

== Local ==
=== Guàrdia Urbana de Barcelona ===
- Constable
- Senior Constable
- Sergeant
- Sub-inspector
- Inspector
- Chief Inspector
- Sub-superintendent
- Superintendent

=== Policía Municipal de Madrid ===
Categories and ranks	Managements				Operations
Policía Municipal de Madrid
Policía Municipal de Madrid	Comisario General	Comisario Principal	Comisario	Intendente	Inspector	Subinspector	Oficial	Policía	Alumno

=== Udaltzaingoa en País Vasco ===
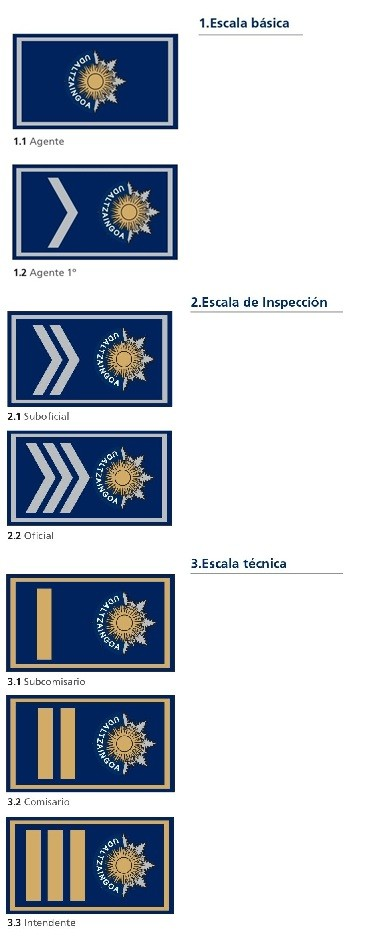

== Defunct agencies ==
=== Guardia de Asalto ===
Officers

Second Spanish Republic

(1931–1936)

Coronel
Teniente Coronel
Comandante
Capitán
Teniente
Alférez
Second Spanish Republic

(1936–1939)

Coronel
Teniente Coronel
Comandante
Capitán
Teniente
Alférez

Non-commissioned ranks

Second Spanish Republic

(1931–1936)

Subteniente
Subayudante
Brigada
Sargento Primero
Sargento
Cabo
Guardia Primero
Guardia
Second Spanish Republic

(1936–1939)

Brigada

Sargento
Cabo

Guardia

=== Armed Police Corps ===
Francoist Spain

(1939–1977)

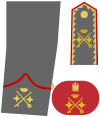
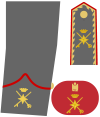
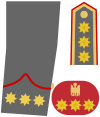
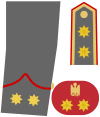
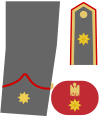
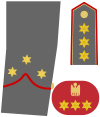
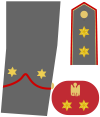
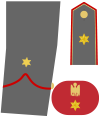
General de División
(Commissioner)
General de Brigada
(Assistant Commissioner)
Coronel
(Chief Superintendent)
Teniente Coronel
(Superintendent)
Comandante
Capitán
Teniente
Alférez
(Station Inspector)

Francoist Spain

(1939–1977)

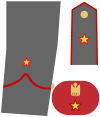

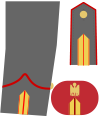

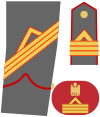

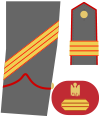

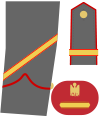

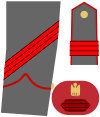

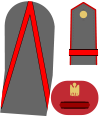

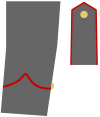

Subteniente
(Sub-inspector)
Brigada
(Head Constable)
Sargento Primero
(Staff Sergeant)
Sargento
(Sergeant)
Cabo Primero
(Corporal)
Cabo
(Lance Corporal)
Policía de Primera
(Senior Constable)
Policía
(Policeman,
Constable)

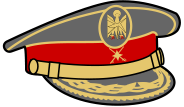
(General de Brigada)
General officers

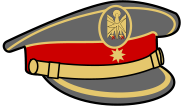
(Comandante)
Senior officers

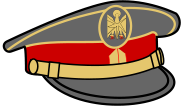
(Brigada)
Officers and NCOs

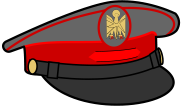
(Policía de Primera)
Enlisted

=== General Police Corps ===
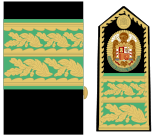
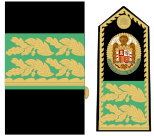
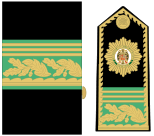
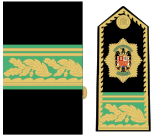
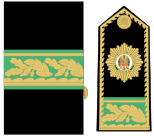
Categories	Command Ranks
Francoist Spain
Francoist Spain	Principal Commissioner	Commissioner General	1st rank Commissioner	2nd rank Commissioner	3rd rank Commissioner/ Chief Inspector

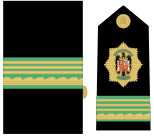
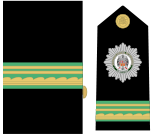
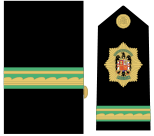
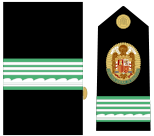
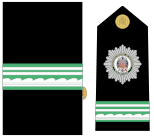
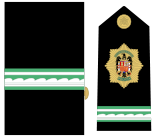
Categories	Executive Ranks			Basic Ranks
Francoist Spain
Francoist Spain	1st rank Inspector	2nd rank Inspector	3rd rank Inspector	Subinspector/ 1st rank Agent	Subinspector/ 2nd rank Agent	Subinspector/ 3rd rank Agent

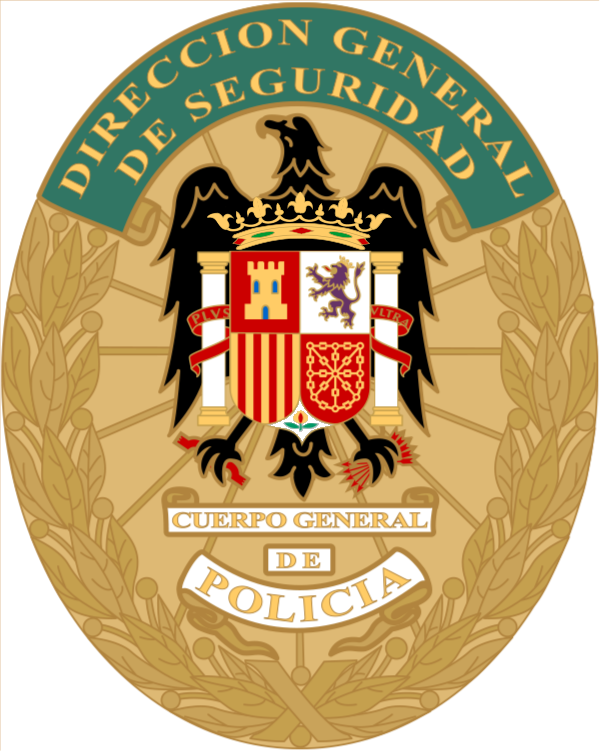
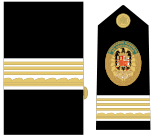
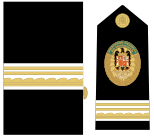
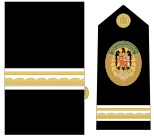
Categories	Basic Ranks (as of 1972)
Francoist Spain
Francoist Spain	Subinspector/ 1st rank Agent	Subinspector/ 2nd rank Agent	Subinspector/ 3rd rank Agent
