= Francoist Catalonia =

1939–1975 period of Catalonia under the rule of Francisco Franco

Francoism in Catalonia was established within Francoist Spain between 1939 and 1975 (with the first democratic elections taking place on June 15, 1977), following the Spanish Civil War and post-war Francoist repression. Francisco Franco's regime replaced Revolutionary Catalonia after the Catalonia Offensive at the end of the war. The dictatorship in Catalonia complemented the suppression of democratic freedoms with the repression of Catalan culture. Its totalitarian character and its unifying objectives meant the imposition of a single culture and a single language, Castilian. The regime was specifically anti-Catalan, but this did not stop the development of a Catalan Francoism that was forged during the war and fed by victory.

Francoism meant, in Catalonia as with the rest of Spain, the cancellation of democratic freedoms, the prohibition and persecution of political parties (except the Falange Espanyola Tradicionalista i de les JONS), the closure of the free press, and the elimination of leftist organisations. In addition, the Statute of Autonomy and its associated institutions were abolished, and the Catalan language and culture were systematically persecuted, at least to begin with, in public and even initially in private.

To the many deaths in the civil war were added those who were shot after the Francoist victory like the president Lluís Companys; many others were forced into exile, unable to return to their country. Many who did not flee were imprisoned or "deprived" and disqualified from holding public office or working in certain professions, which left them in a dire economic situation during already difficult times. A small group of anarchists and communists were intent on waging a guerrilla war in units known as the maquis. Their most notable action was the invasion of the Vall d'Aran.

After the first stage of a self-sufficient economy, in the 1960s the economy entered into a stage of agricultural modernization, an increase in industry, and mass tourism. Catalonia was also the destination for many migrants, which accelerated the growth of Barcelona and the surrounding regions. The anti-Franco opposition was well developed, seen mostly visibly in the labour movement with the Commissions Obreres (workers' commissions), trade unions, and the PSUC.

In the 1970s, democratic forces were unified around the Assembly of Catalonia. On November 20, 1975, Franco died, opening a new period in the history of Catalonia.

== Anti-Catalan hostility ==
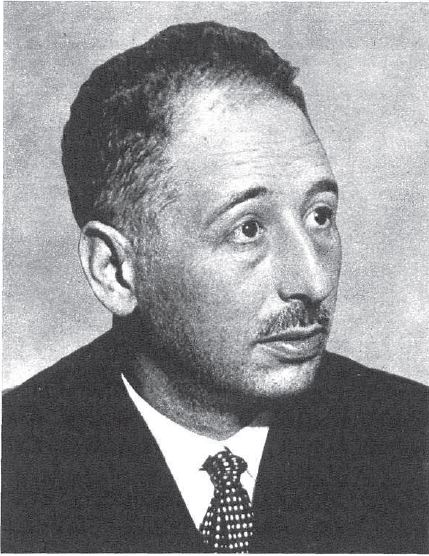
Lluís Companys, second president of the restored Generalitat de Catalunya, was captured by the Gestapo and executed by the Francoists.

Catalonia suffered the most fierce engagements during the civil war, as seen in several examples. In Tarragona, in January 1939, mass was held by a canon from Salamanca cathedral, José Artero. During the sermon he cried: "Catalan dogs! You are not worthy of the sun that shines on you." ("¡Perros catalanes! No sois dignos del sol que os alumbra.") Regarding the men who entered and marched through Barcelona, Franco said the honour was not "because they had fought better, but because they were those who felt more hatred. That is, more hatred towards Catalonia and Catalans." ("porque hubieran luchado mejor, sino porque eran los que sentían más odio. Es decir, más odio hacia Cataluña y los catalanes.")

A close friend of Franco, Victor Ruiz Albéniz, published an article in which he demanded that Catalonia receive "a Biblical punishment (Sodom and Gomarrah) to purify the red city, the headquarters of anarchism and separatism as the only remedy to remove these two cancers by relentless cauterisation" ("un castigo bíblico (Sodoma y Gomorra) para purificar la ciudad roja, la sede del anarquismo y separatismo como único remedio para extirpar esos dos cánceres por termocauterio implacable"), while for Serrano Suñer, brother-in-law of Franco and Minister of the Interior, Catalan nationalism was "an illness" ("una enfermedad.")

The man appointed as civil governor of Barcelona, Wenceslao González Oliveros, said that "Spain was raised, with as much or more force against the dismembered statutes as against Communism and that any tolerance of regionalism would again lead to the same processes of putrefaction that we have just surgically removed." ("España se alzó, con tanta o más fuerza contra los Estatutos desmembrados que contra el comunismo y que cualquier tolerancia del regionalismo llevaría otra vez a los mismos procesos de putrefacción que acabamos de extirpar quirúrgicamente.")

Even Catalan conservatives, such as Francesc Cambó, were themselves frightened by Franco's hatred and spirit of revenge. Cambó wrote of Franco in his diary: "As if he did not feel or understand the miserable, desperate situation in which Spain finds itself and only thinks about his victory, he feels the need to travel the whole country (...) like a bullfighter to gather applause, cigars, hats and some scarce American." ("Como si no sintiera ni comprendiera la situación miserable, desesperada, en que se encuentra España y no pensara más que en su victoria, siente la necesidad de recorrer todo el país (...) como un torero para recoger aplausos, cigarros, sombreros y alguna americana escasa.")

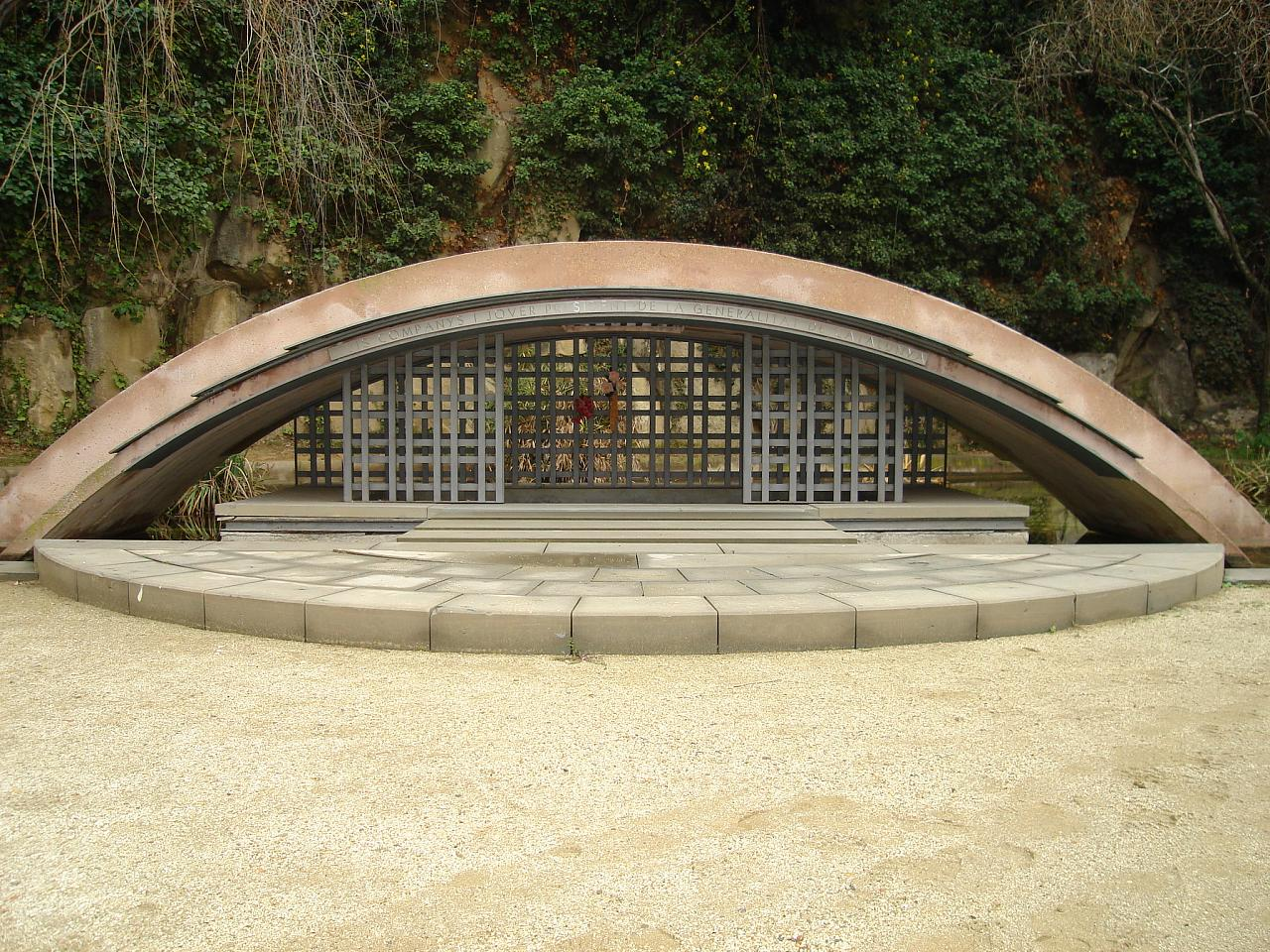
Tomb of Lluís Companys at Fossar de la Pedrera.

The 2nd president of the Generalitat de Catalunya, Lluís Companys, went into exile in France, like many others, in January 1939. The Spanish authorities asked for him to be extradited to Germany. The questions remains whether he was detained by the Gestapo or the German military police, known as the Wehrmacht. In any case, he was detained on August 13, 1940, and immediately deported to Franco's Spain.

After a summary court martial without due process, he was executed on October 15, 1940, at Montjuïc Castle. Since then there have been many calls to cancel that judgement, without success.

=== Francoist repression ===
After the repression, the Franco regime created networks of complicity in which thousands of people were involved or were accomplices, in all possible ways, of the bloodshed inflicted, of the persecutions carried out, of the lives of hundreds of thousands people in prisons, concentration camps or Battalions workers. In short, the most diverse forms of repression: political, social, labor, ideological, and in the case of Catalonia, in an attempt of cultural genocide that sought to do away with its specific national personality...

— Josep Maria Solé i Sabaté i Joan Vilarroya i Font

The confluence between Spanish regenerationism and the degenerationist theories originated in France and Great Britain must also be considered. As a consequence is theorized a racial degeneration causing conflicts against the social status quo, and it is advocated eugenics to cleanse one's own race, and racism to avoid mixing it with "inferior races." During the first third of the s. XX this theorizing towards the "new man" is gaining strength, and its zenith is Nazi racial politics. But in Spain it also had an impact, given that the political and social elites who patrimonialize Spain, and who would not digest the colonial loss, see in the Republic and the meager Catalan autonomy a threat to its status, power and wealth. The Catalan industrial wealth cannot be tolerated either, and Catalonia is accused of having a favorable treatment, impoverishing the rest of the Spaniards, in a behavior that is described as Semitic (according to the National-Socialist ideology to use work as a means to exploit and subjugate nations).

According to Paul Preston in the book "Arquitectes del terror. Franco i els artifex de l'odi", a number of characters theorized about "anti-Spain", pointing to enemies, and in this sense accused politicians and republican intellectuals of being of Jewish race or servants of the same as masons. This accusation is widespread in Catalonia for most politicians and intellectuals, starting with Macià, Companys and Cambó, identified as Jews. "Racisme i supremacisme polítics a l'Espanya contemporània" documents this thought of the social part that would be raised against the Republic. In a mixture of degenerationism, regenerationism, and neocolonialism, it is postulated that the Spanish race—always understood as Castilian—has degenerated, and degenerate individuals are prone to "contract" communism and separatism. In addition, some areas, such as the south of the peninsula and the Catalan countries, are considered to be degenerate wholesale, the former due to Arab remains that lead them to a "rifty" behavior, and the latter due to Semitic remains that lead them towards communism and separatism (the catalanism of any kind is called separatism).

The degeneration of individuals calls for a cleansing if it wants a prosperous and leading nation, capable of building an empire, one of the obsessions of Franco (as well as other totalitarian regimes of the time). In this regard, rebel spokesman Gonzalo de Aguilera, in 1937, told a journalist: "Now I hope you understand what we mean by the regeneration of Spain ... Our program consists of exterminating a third of the Spanish male population ...", and an interview can also be mentioned in an Italian newspaper where Franco describes that the war was aimed at "to save the Homeland that was sinking in the sea of dissociation and racial degeneration"

In addition to the repression throughout Spain against certain individuals, all this seems to be the source of the fierce repression, such as the Terror of Don Bruno, in Andalusia, and the no less fierce repression against Catalonia, with the addition that as a result, the attack on Catalan culture, lasted throughout the Franco regime and ended up becoming a structural element of the state.

=== Persecution of Catalan ===
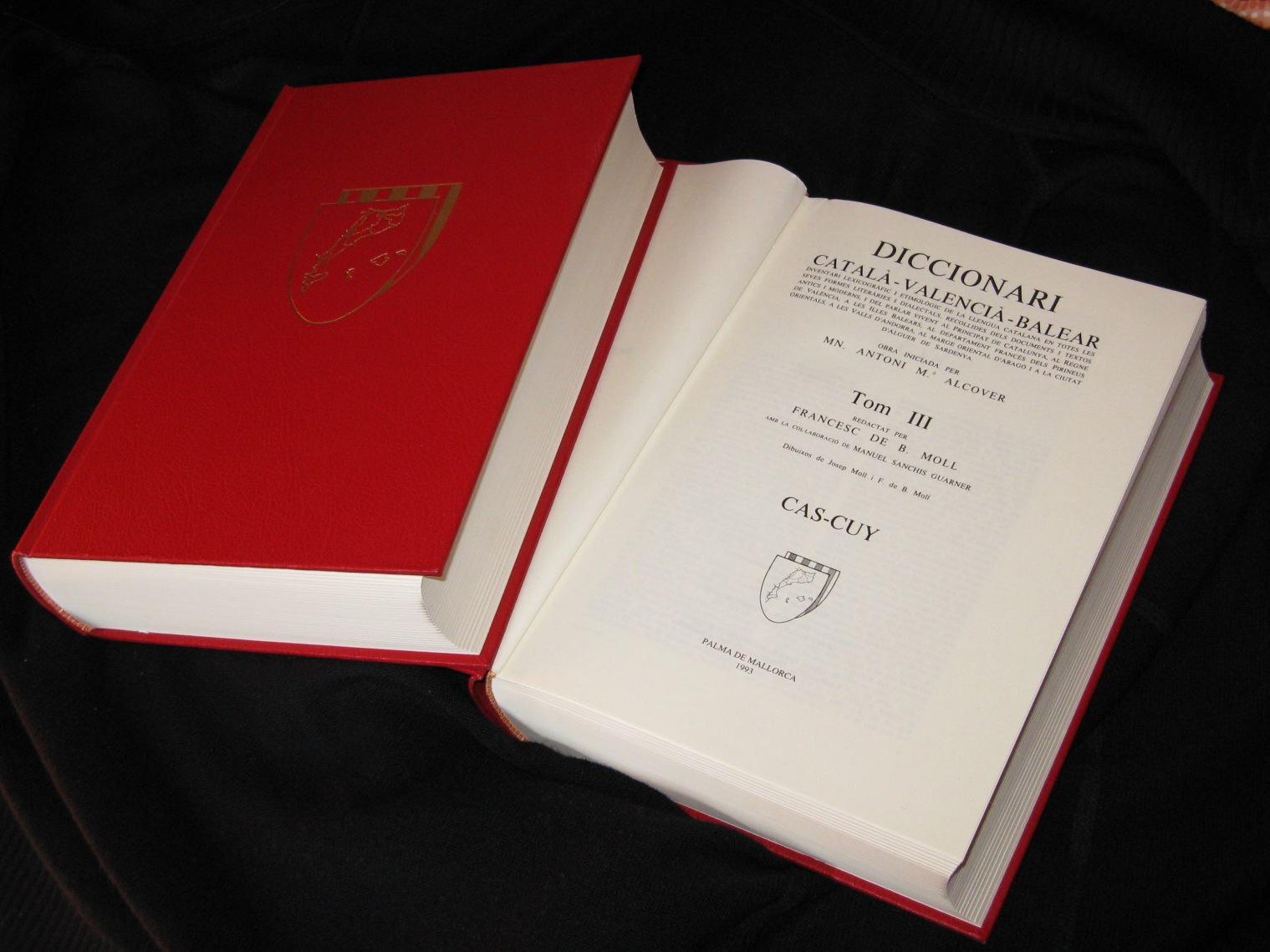
Printed edition of the Catalan-Valencian-Balearic dictionary.

During the dictatorship of Franco (1939–1975), not only democratic freedoms were suppressed, but also the Catalan language, which was excluded from the education system and relegated to the family sphere. Castilian (Spanish) became the only language of education, administration and the media.

Rafael Aracil, Joan Oliver and Antoni Segura considered that until 1951, the persecution of the language was "total". In some places students had to denounce fellow students who spoke Catalan. During this period, the Catalan language was also prohibited on tombstones.

With the defeat of Nazi Germany in 1945, the regime changed their image, which allowed the Orfeó Català to put on Catalan productions, and the publication of Catalan books, though only classic works; works aimed at young people were prohibited to limit the learning of the written language. Among these authors were those who returned from exile in 1942–1943. Their works include a Catalan translation of the Odyssey (1948) by Carles Riba, and research conducted by teacher Alexandre Galí with Història de les Institucions 1900–1936 (History of Institutions), which even today are reference works.

Later on, opening of the regime allowed a small change in the marginalization of the language, such as the broadcast in 1964 of the first Catalan television program on TVE (Teatre català), the Nova Cançó (New Song) (1961) movement, and the creation in 1971 of the Assembly of Catalonia, in which anti-Francoist forces were clustered, all maintained the use of Catalan, though there were limits such as the ban on Joan Manuel Serrat singing in Catalan at the Eurovision Song Contest in 1968. In 1970, Franco's education law opened the door to the use of different languages in primary education, with another decree following in 1975. Also in 1975, near Franco's death, another decree allowed the use of other native Spanish languages in councils.

The use of Catalan language was further reduced due to migration of Spanish speakers in the 20th century, particularly in the 1960s and 1970s, from the rest of Spain, especially Andalusia and Extremadura, who were for the most part concentrated around metropolitan Barcelona. The result was that Spanish passed Catalan as a mother tongue for the first time in the history of Catalonia. It has been calculated that, without immigration, the population of Catalonia would have gone from about 2 million in 1900 to 2.4 million in 2001, instead of more than 6.1 million; in other words, without immigration the population would have been 39% of its actual size by 1980.

Both within Catalonia and in exile, there were several initiatives such as books (like "Rosa mística" by Mossèn Geis), magazines (like "Dau al set", edited by Brossa) and campaigns to oppose the silence imposed by the regime, for example, Pío Daví and Maria Vila performed theatre, including "L'hostal de la glòria" by Josep Maria de Sagarra.

The almost total exclusion of Catalan from the education system and severe limitations to its use in mass media had long-lasting consequences years after the end of the dictatorship, seen in high rates of illiteracy in Catalan in generations schooled in those years. In 1996, only one-third of those aged 40–44 was able to write in Catalan versus two-thirds who could speak it, figures than dropped to 22% and 65% among those aged over 80. Franco declared in 1939: "We want absolute national unity, with only one language, Spanish, and a single personality, Spanish." This led to an almost complete disappearance of books printed in Catalan until 1946.

In 1941, despite the prohibition of Catalan, Poesies, de "Lo Gayter del Llobregat" was illegally reissued to commemorate the centenary of its original publication, which had been the origin of the Renaixença movement. In the years following, other books were published such as those by three young writers: Les elegies de Bierville by Carles Riba (1943), L'aprenent de poeta (1943), by Josep Palau i Fabre, i Cementiri de Sinera, by Salvador Espriu (1946), each in only about a hundred copies.

In 1947, the Institut d'Estudis Catalans passed censorship by publishing a scientific book, showing that Catalan was also a language of science. The Catalan-Valencian-Balearic Dictionary began publication in 1949 and was completed in 1962 by the philologist Francesc de Borja Moll, who became a campaigner in Catalan-speaking territories, to defend the unity of the language and affirm Catalan identity.

== Catalan Francoists ==
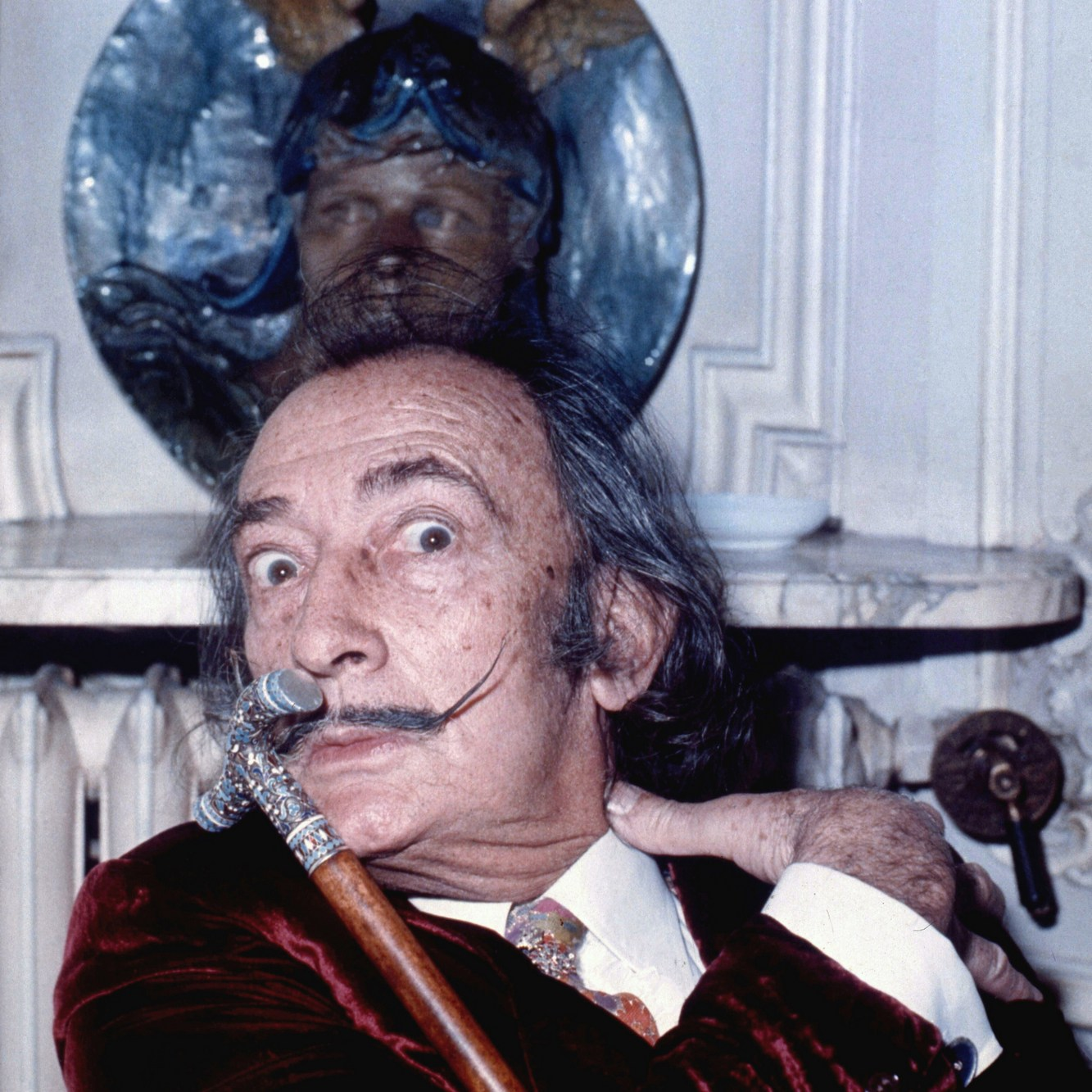
Salvador Dalí in Paris in 1972.

Joan Antoni Samaranch

In Catalonia there were many intellectuals (painters, writers, journalists, etc.) who collaborated with the Franco regime, receiving in return the approval and favour of the regime. Some of them were in the conservative Lliga Regionalista, later Lliga de Catalunya, led by Francesc Cambó. Such people included Salvador Dalí, Josep Pla and Juan Antonio Samaranch, for example.

In 1936, André Breton expelled Dalí from his surrealistic circle due to his fascist tendencies, leaving the artist as one of the few intellectuals who supported Franco after the Spanish Civil War. In 1949, Dalí returned to Catalonia, after a stay in the US, with the approval of Franco's government, who used it as a political propaganda, which was widely criticized by many intellectuals and progressives.

Josep Pla, a moderate Catalanist, was elected deputy of the Commonwealth of Catalonia for the Regionalist League in his hometown, Alt Empordà, in 1921. After exile in Rome, he returned to Barcelona in January 1939, alongside Manuel Aznar and other Francoist journalists, to take over the editing of the newspaper La Vanguardia (then named La Vanguardia Española).

Juan Antonio Samaranch, a member of the FET y de las JONS from a very young age, began his political career on the Barcelona City Council when he was appointed Sports Councilor in 1955. Under the Franco regime, he held the positions of procurador (1964-1977, member of the lower house) of the Cortes Españolas, National Delegate for Sports and President of the Diputació de Barcelona until he arrived at the International Olympic Committee Presidency (1980–2001). In 1985 he received the Gold Medal of the Generalitat of Catalonia and in 1988 he was awarded the Prince of Asturias Prize for Sports. He died on April 21, 2010, in Barcelona and his body was displayed in a chapel in the Palau de la Generalitat de Catalunya at the same time that a mass was held, which brought together 4,000 people in the Barcelona Cathedral officiated by the Archbishop of Barcelona, Lluís Martínez Sistach. However, his last few years were noteworthy for criticisms of his ambiguous position with respect to the Franco regime.

Among the Francoist mayors were Josep Maria de Porcioles in Barcelona and Josep Gomis in Montblanc. Josep Maria de Porcioles (1904–1993), was mayor of Barcelona during the Franco regime. The municipal administration of Porcioles was generally not coherent from a budgetary and political point of view, apart from carrying out uncontrolled urban development. In 1983, during the mayoralty of Pasqual Maragall, Porcioles was awarded the gold medal of the city of Barcelona; Maragall had been a high official of the city council during the Porcioles era. During his funeral he was honored, among other authorities, by Maragall, as a Catalan figure, which was controversial.

Josep Gomis i Martí of Montblanc (1934) had a broad political career; he spent twenty-five years at the Montblanc Town Hall, sixteen as mayor (1964–1980), was provincial deputy, Solicitor in the Cortes, President of the Provincial Council of Tarragona (1980–88), Member of the Cortes for the Convergència i Unió (CiU), (1982 and 1986 legislatures), Government Minister of the Generalitat de Catalunya (1988–92), delegate of the Government of the Generalitat in Madrid (1993–2002) and president of the Social Council of the Rovira i Virgili University (2002–04). On July 29, 1996, he was named "favourite son" of the town of Montblanc.

FC Barcelona did not escape the regime; there were many presidents who agreed with the regime. Among them were Narcís de Carreras who was part of the Lliga Catalana and was a collaborator of Francesc Cambó until 1939. Later, he was president of FC Barcelona (1968–1969) and La Caixa (1972–1980), Councillor of the City Council and a solicitor in the Cortes (1967–1971). In contrast, Josep Sunyol, also president of FC Barcelona and a prominent militant of the Republican Left of Catalonia, was shot on August 6, 1936, in the Sierra de Guadarrama without trial by Francoist troops. Sunyol had been detained, along with journalist Ventura Virgili, a chauffeur and an officer, when they visited the front. As a tribute, a Barça club in Palafolls is named after him.

== A decade of repression ==
Between 1953 and 1963, dictatorship and persecutions, arrests, torture, unfair trials, imprisonment and the murder of many fighters for freedom and democracy persisted. Two months before the International Eucharistic Congress, held in Barcelona, there were still five executions in Camp de la Bóta (1952) and for years the Law on Political Responsibilities and the repression of masonry and communism would continue in force. It was in this decade (1953–1963) when the maquis and rural and urban guerrillas disappeared. The network of police and judicial repression was put in place to face workers' protests, and to carry out the control and censorship of publications, theatre, cinema and teaching. The apparatus of Franco was formed by the Government of the State, provincial civil governments, uniformed police, and political and social investigation. Also spread the multiplicity of judicial courts, the military and the Court of Public Order, (TOP) 1963, which was not dissolved until 1977 by a decree of Juan Carlos I of Spain, although most TOP judges were promoted and ended up at the Supreme Court or the National Court, which was created on the same day that the TOP was dissolved.

=== Barcelona tram strike ===
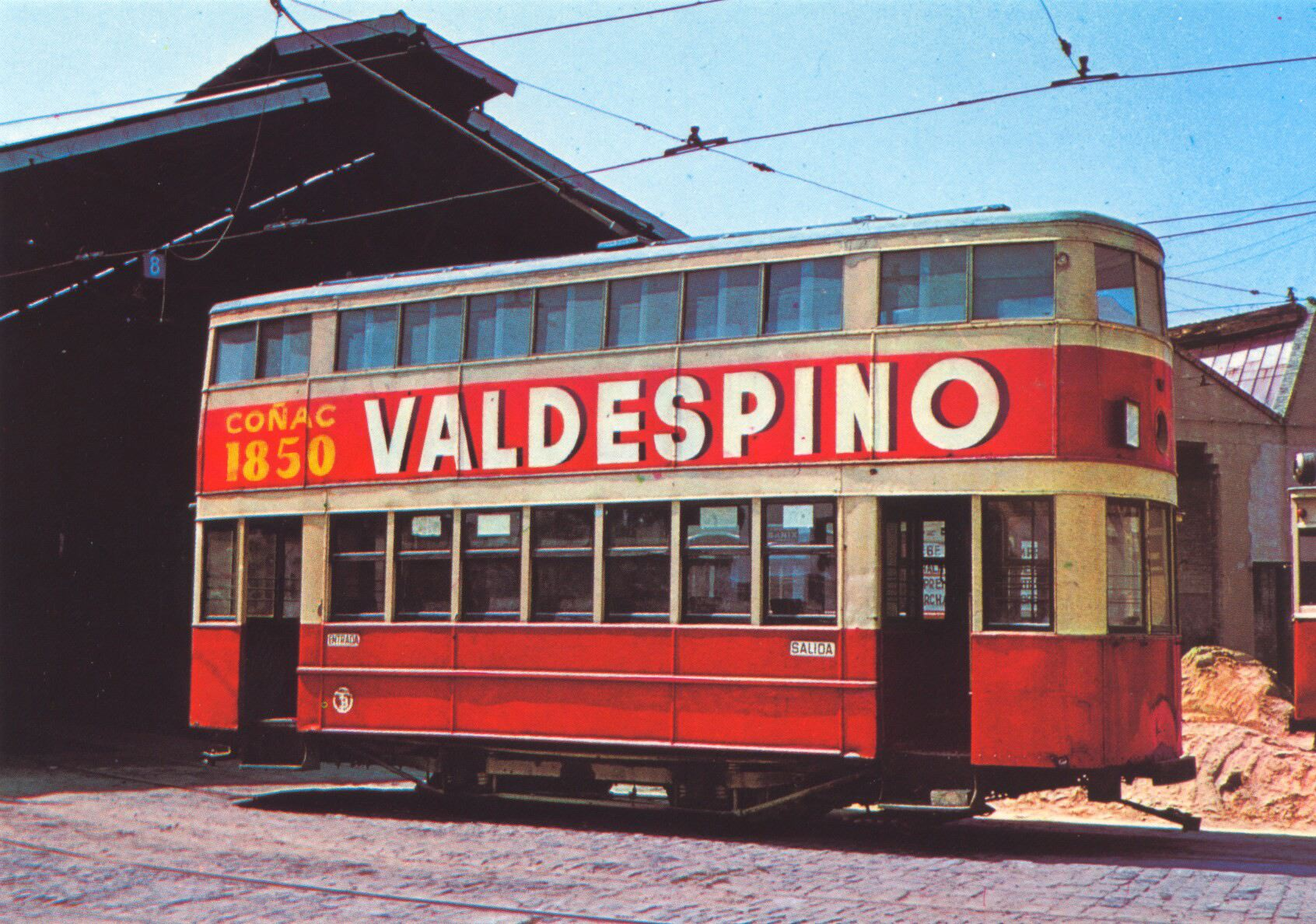
Tram in Barcelona in the 1950s.

The initial reason for the Barcelona tram strike was the increase in ticket prices and the unfairness compared with the price of the same service in Madrid, but the protest expressed the deep discomfort among the population due to the tough living conditions that most of the people had suffered since the end of the Spanish civil war. The tram strike of 1951, which lasted two weeks, was undoubtedly a turning point in the history of opposition to the Franco regime: not to take the tram was not a crime.

Repression of the movement was extremely difficult due to the peaceful nature of the strike, the involvement of several and new social sectors, participation in the boycott of some Falangists, the weakness of the governor, Eduardo Baeza Alegría, and the explicit refusal by the general captain to intervene, arguing that he "could not shoot on citizens who simply did not take a means of transport". The civil governor, Eduardo Baeza, used the Guardia Civil in fatal confrontations on March 12. Finally, both he and the mayor of Barcelona, Josep Maria Albert, were dismissed and the price increase was cancelled. The tram strike marked the beginning of an era.

A similar strike was repeated in 1957, which lasted for 12 days and had the support of the intellectual world headed by Jaume Vicens i Vives, and also featured characters such as Josep Benet, Maurici Serrahima, Edmon Vallès, Santiago Nadal, Salvador Millet, and Rafael Tasis.

== Maquis ==
The maquis were French Resistance groups who, hidden in sparsely populated regions, forests, or mountains, fought against the German occupation of France during World War II. By extension, the Spanish Maquis, refers to armed groups in Spain, especially in the Cantabrian Mountains, the Pyrenees, Catalonia, Valencia, Aragon and Andalusia, who opposed Franco's regime after the Civil War.

As of the summer of 1944, when France was liberated from German forces, Maquis actions were intensified in Catalonia. These included an assault on the Moritz beer factory in August 1944 and an invasion of the Val d'Aran between October 8 and 9, 1944. 2,500 guerrillas entered the valley well equipped and with heavy weapons, under the leadership of the Communists. With this offensive and a similar one with 2,500 guerrillas a few days later, they wanted to conquer part of Spanish territory, declaring the area conquered under the government of the Spanish republic, which was then in exile, and force the allies to free Spain from the Franco government, as they were doing in the rest of Europe. After their defeat in the Val d'Aran, the Communists abandoned this type of struggle.

=== Death of the last Catalan maquis ===
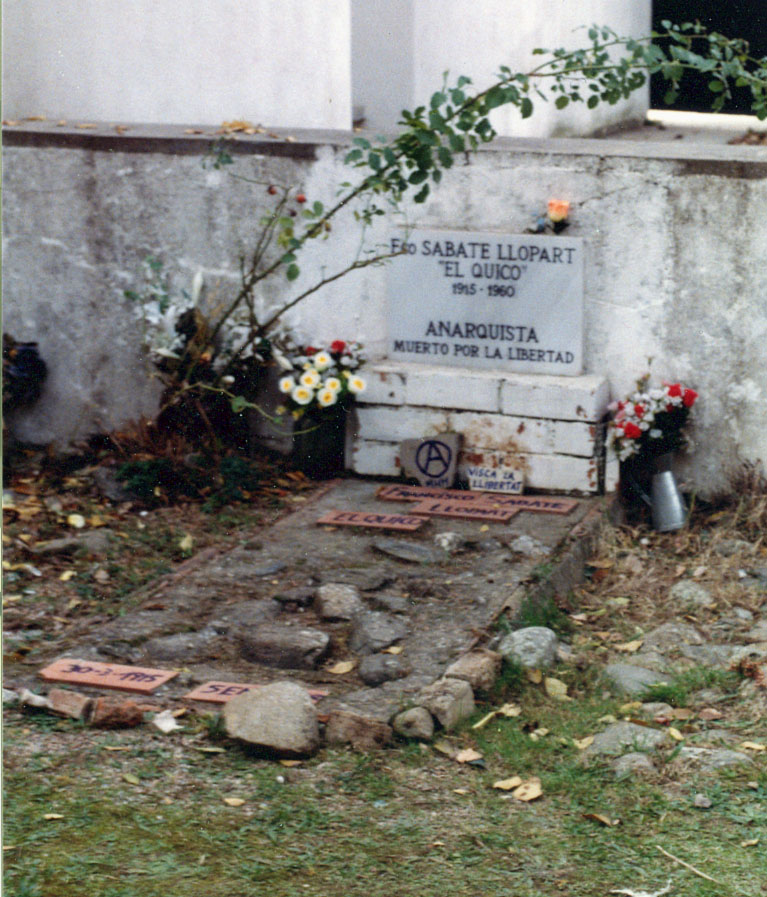
Tomb of Quico Sabaté in the cemetery of Sant Celoni.

The two last maquis, Quico Sabaté and Ramon Vila Caracremada followed parallel paths towards the end of their lives.

Quico Sabaté, surely the most emblematic maquis, was imprisoned in Perpignan for a few months after the discovery of an illegal arms repository. At the end of the sentence he returned to Spain on December 30, 1959, accompanied by four other companions: Antoni Miracle Guitart, Rogelio Madrigal Torres, Francesc Conesa Alcaraz and Martí Ruiz Montoya. The group, which was seen from the beginning in Albanyà, walked towards Maià de Montcal, and spent the night at the casta de Folgars, a farmhouse abandoned on the mountain of the Virgen del Mont. The Guardia Civil surrounded them and there was a shooting where Quico Sabaté was injured, while his four companions were shot dead at the end of Palol de Revardit that same night. Despite serious injuries, Quico Sabaté arrived at the town of Sant Celoni, where he was killed after putting up a strong resistance. The man died, but not his myth.

After sabotaging high tension towers in Rajadell in August 1963, Caracremada calmly returned trip to his refuge in Prada. Guardia Civil of the 231rd Command of Manresa tried to surround him. The guards were seen, not only in Rajadell, but also in Callús, Fonollosa, Sant Mateu de Bages and in other neighboring areas. On the night of August 6/7, he was shot dead by the Guardia Civil at the abandoned farmhouse of La Creu del Perelló, between Castellnou de Bages and Balsareny. He was buried in the cemetery of Castellnou de Bages without any marker. The priest of the parish, considering him marginal, did not even register this in the book of ecclesiastical registration.

== University occupation ==
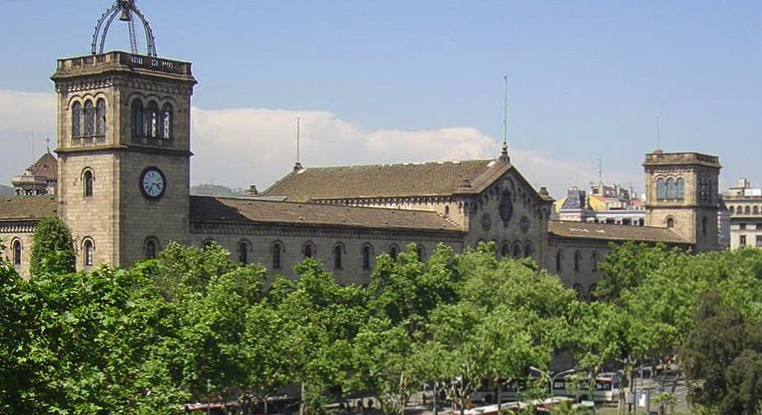
Historic buildings of the University of Barcelona

A revolt in 1969 by about 500 University of Barcelona students who occupied the Rector's office faced an immediate response of the forces of public order, who enclosed them at the university. They intended to leave, but the civil governor, Felipe Acedo Colunga, ordered the police to arrest and fine the students and occupy the university, something new from the 1939. The change in the university political landscape was also felt with the growth of leftist and Marxist groups, such as the PSUC.

== Sixties and seventies ==
Throughout the sixties, dissidence within Franco's Spain grew to become a decisive factor in political life. Total repression was counterproductive to the government's image because it demonstrated that only force guaranteed stability, but a certain level of tolerance was equivalent to weakness and only favoured the expression of discontent. The situation had become more complex. The traditional subversive groups like the Communists now collaborated with others who could not be labeled like this, like Catholics. On the other hand, given their aim to enter the European Economic Community, the regime had to take care not to use excessive force. However, international opinion really mattered very little.

Being imprisoned for political reasons ceased to be, as the historians Carles Feixa and Carme Agustí say, a stigma for the prisoner. Losing freedom to defend it became a source of pride. Labour relations had undergone a major change in 1958, when the Collective Bargaining Law established negotiation between employers and workers as a means of resolving conflicts. It became a novelty in Franco's Spain, where the class struggle had been abolished by decree. In this framework, everyone realized that the consumer society was a qualitative change. Appliances such as televisions or washing machines and vehicles like the Seat 600 were available to workers. This economic growth caused a profound social transformation in Catalonia.

=== Festival of the Palau de la Música ===
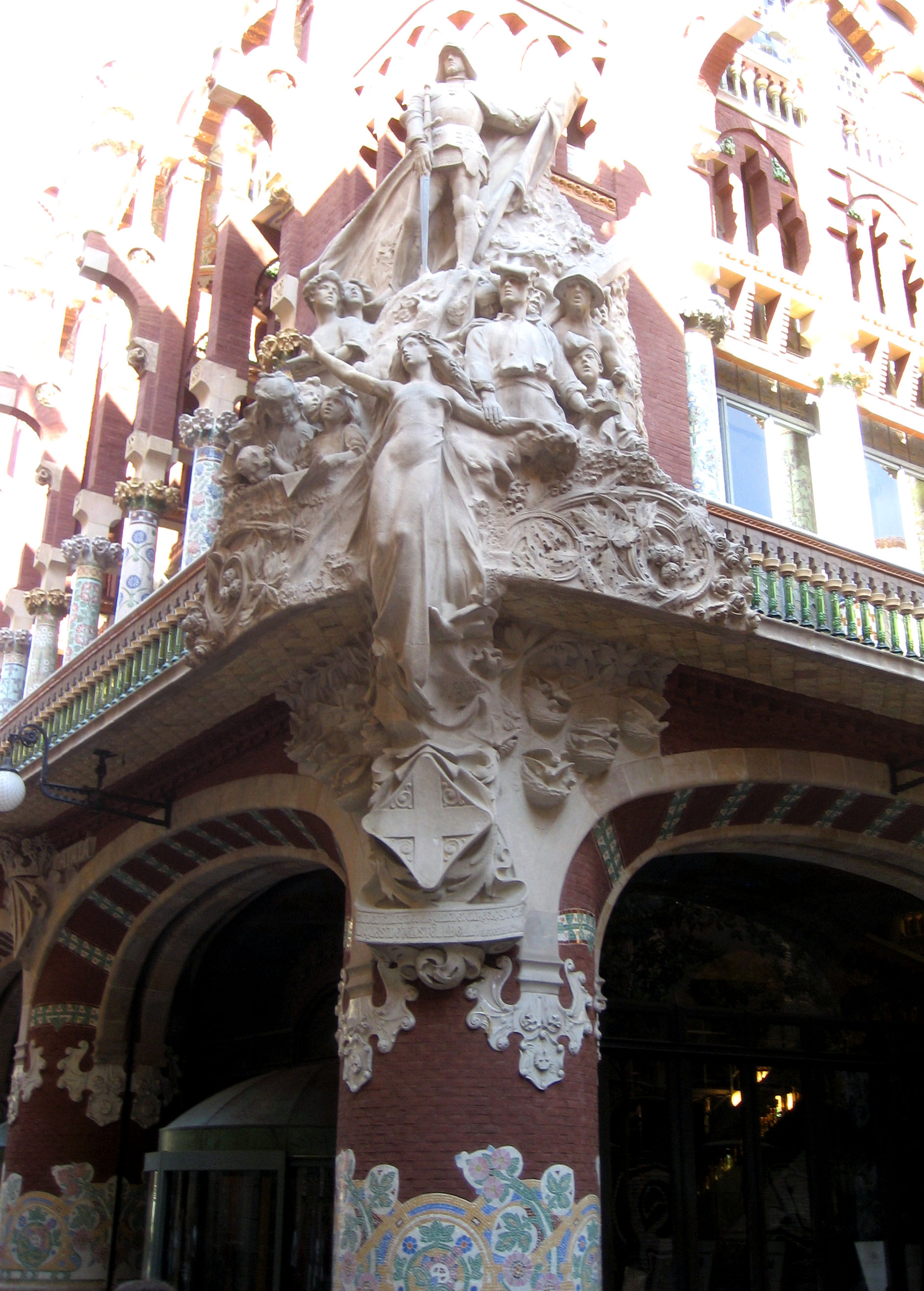
Main entrance of the Palau de la Música Catalana

The festival of the palace took place at the Palau de la Música Catalana on May 19, 1960, during the tribute to the centenary of the birth of Catalan poet Joan Maragall organized by the Orfeó Català with Franco's Ministers. Within the authorized repertoire there was the Cant de la Senyera. Three days earlier, however, the civil governor Felipe Acedo Colunga, forbade it to be sung. This unleashed the indignation of the assistants and Josep Espar began to sing, then the police began to hit the singer activists. Jordi Pujol, who was not at the Palau but had been one of the organizers of the event, was arrested on May 22. The future President of the Generalitat of Catalonia, he faced a war council that took place on June 13. The outcome was a sentence of seven years for Pujol. Pujol would declare years later that the events of the Palau de la Música were the first Catalan victory against the Franco regime.

=== New declaration of a state of emergency ===
The main reason given by the Minister of Interior, Camilo Alonso Vega, to adopt these measures was a "conspiracy" by the so-called "Contuberni de Munic", a meeting of 118 opponents of the regime that took place in Munich within the framework of the IV Congress of the European International Movement. The state of emergency served the regime to deal with a series of strikes, the consolidation of ETA and to stop the rebellion of the student movement against the Spanish University Union. Faced with these new movements, the dictatorship showed its most repressive aspect. The suspensions of the Law were repeated until the year Franco died.

=== Exile of Abbot Escarré ===
The abbot of Montserrat, Aureli Maria Escarré, renovated the monastery, sent monks to study abroad and gave support to multiple cultural initiatives. Little by little, he adopted a critical stance against the regime, which culminated in statements to the French newspaper Le Monde, published on November 14, 1963. The abbot declared: "Where there is no authentic freedom, there is no justice, ... the people must be able to choose their government, ... the regime hinders the development of Catalan culture ... the first subversion that exists in Spain is that of the government ... We have not twenty-five years of peace behind, but twenty-five years of victory. It was forced to fight alongside the latter, they have done nothing to end this division between winners and losers, this represents one of the most regrettable failures of a regime called Christian, the state of which, however, does not obey the basic principles of Christianity."

The Franco regime was outraged. The authorities pressured the Vatican to take action against Escarré. Finally the abbot received from the Vatican the "recommendation" to leave the monastery. On March 12, 1965, Abbot Escarré went into exile.

=== Nova Cançó ===
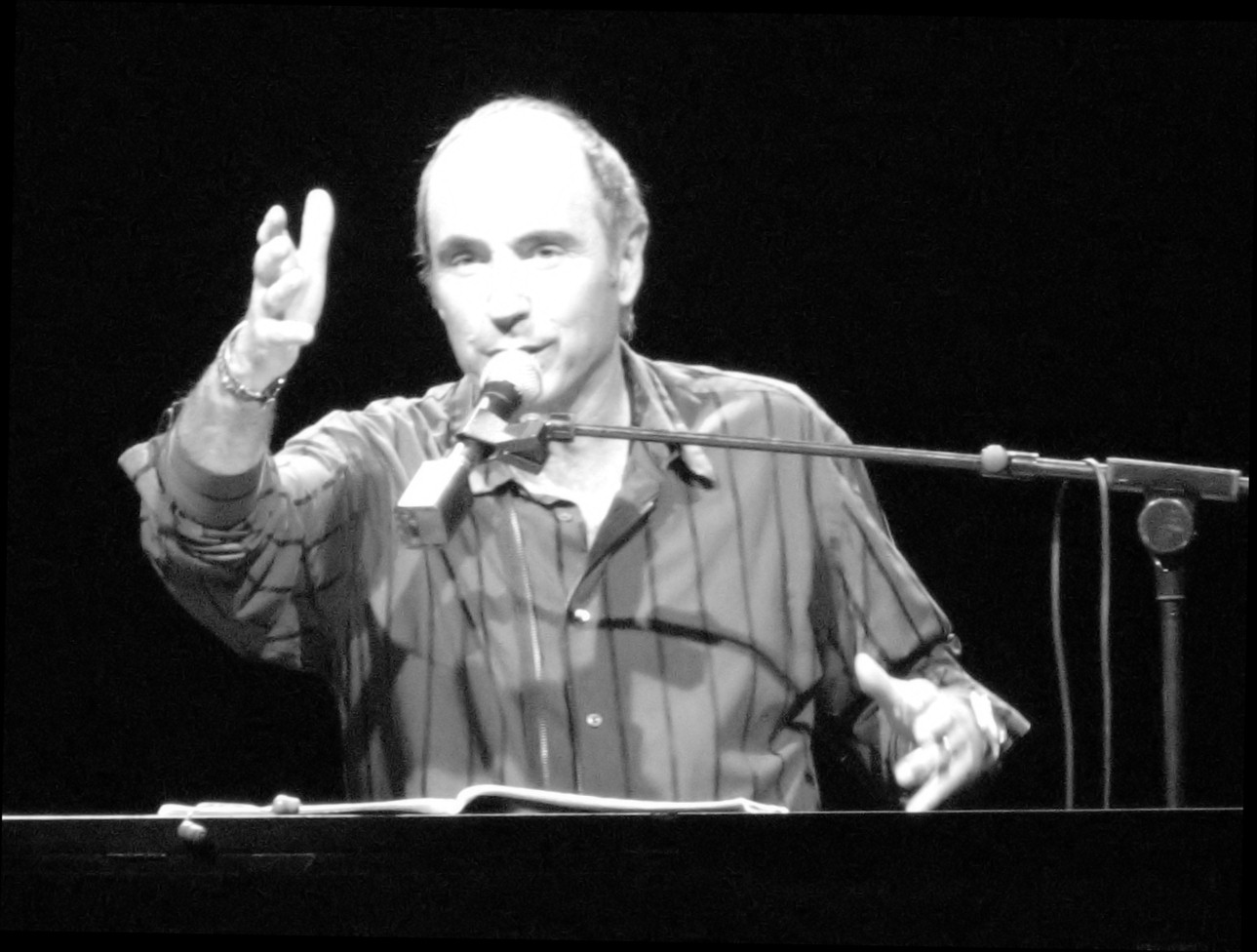
Lluís Llach during a performance at the Olympia in Paris in 2006.

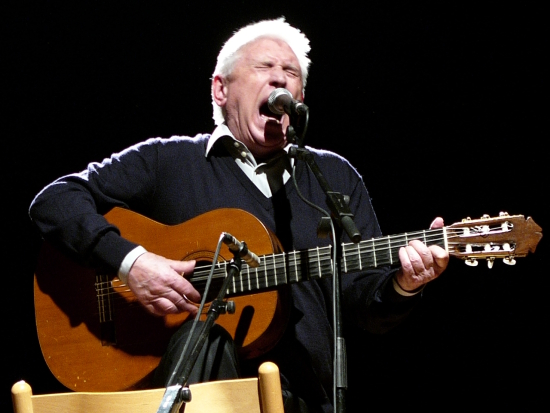
Raimon in Almussafes on February 24, 2008.

The importance of the Nova Cançó (New Song) in Francoist Spain was remarkable, breaking the silence imposed by Franco on the Catalan language and culture. The origin of the Nova Cançó was an article by Lluís Serrahima titled "ens calen cançons d'ara" (we need songs from now), published in January 1959 in the magazine Germinábit, later Serra d'Or.

The first albums were published under the sponsorship of musician Josep Casas i Augé. The Serrano sisters and Josep Guardiola interpreted versions of some international successes in Catalan, although the Francoist censorship forced them to be sung in Spanish. These performers, together with others like Font Sellabona and Rudy Ventura, made up the beginnings of the Nova Cançó. Miquel Porter i Moix, Remei Margarit and Josep Maria Espinàs were the founders in 1961 of the group called Els Setze Jutges. On December 19, 1961, at The Center for Female Catholic Influence of Barcelona, where Miquel Porter and Josep Maria Espinàs sang, the term Nova Cançó was coined. After playing at the Penya Barcelonista in Premià de Mar on April 29, 1962, Espinàs baptized the incipient movement as Els Setze Jutges. Delfí Abella and Francesc Pi de la Serra joined in 1962, then Enric Barbat, Xavier Elies and Guillermina Motta in 1963, Maria del Carme Girau, Martí Llauradó, Joan Ramon Bonet and Maria Amèlia Pedrerol in 1964, Joan Manuel Serrat in 1965, Maria del Mar Bonet in 1966 and, finally, Rafael Subirachs and Lluís Llach completed the sixteen members in 1967.

=== La Caputxinada ===
In the middle of the sixties, the Francoist union Sindicato Español Universitario (SEU) opposed an assembly from which arose the future SDEUB (Democratic Students ' Union of the University of Barcelona), with more than a thousand students gathering at the Faculty of Economics of the University of Barcelona. Everything was planned for the constitution of the SDEUB, which took place on March 9, 1966, at the Sarrià Capuchins. The Capuchin fathers had given permission to use their auditorium, hence the word "Caputxinada".

More than 500 people, especially students, but also teachers and 33 intellectuals and artists such as Jordi Rubió, Joan Oliver, Salvador Espriu, Antoni Tàpies and Maria Aurèlia Capmany, met at Sarrià. In just one hour the statutes, the declaration of principles and the manifesto had been approved (which was titled "Per una universitat democrática", for a democratic university). There was just enough time to be able to constitute the SDEUB before the police arrived at the convent and gave the order to immediately dissolve the assembly.

=== Meeting of intellectuals at Montserrat ===
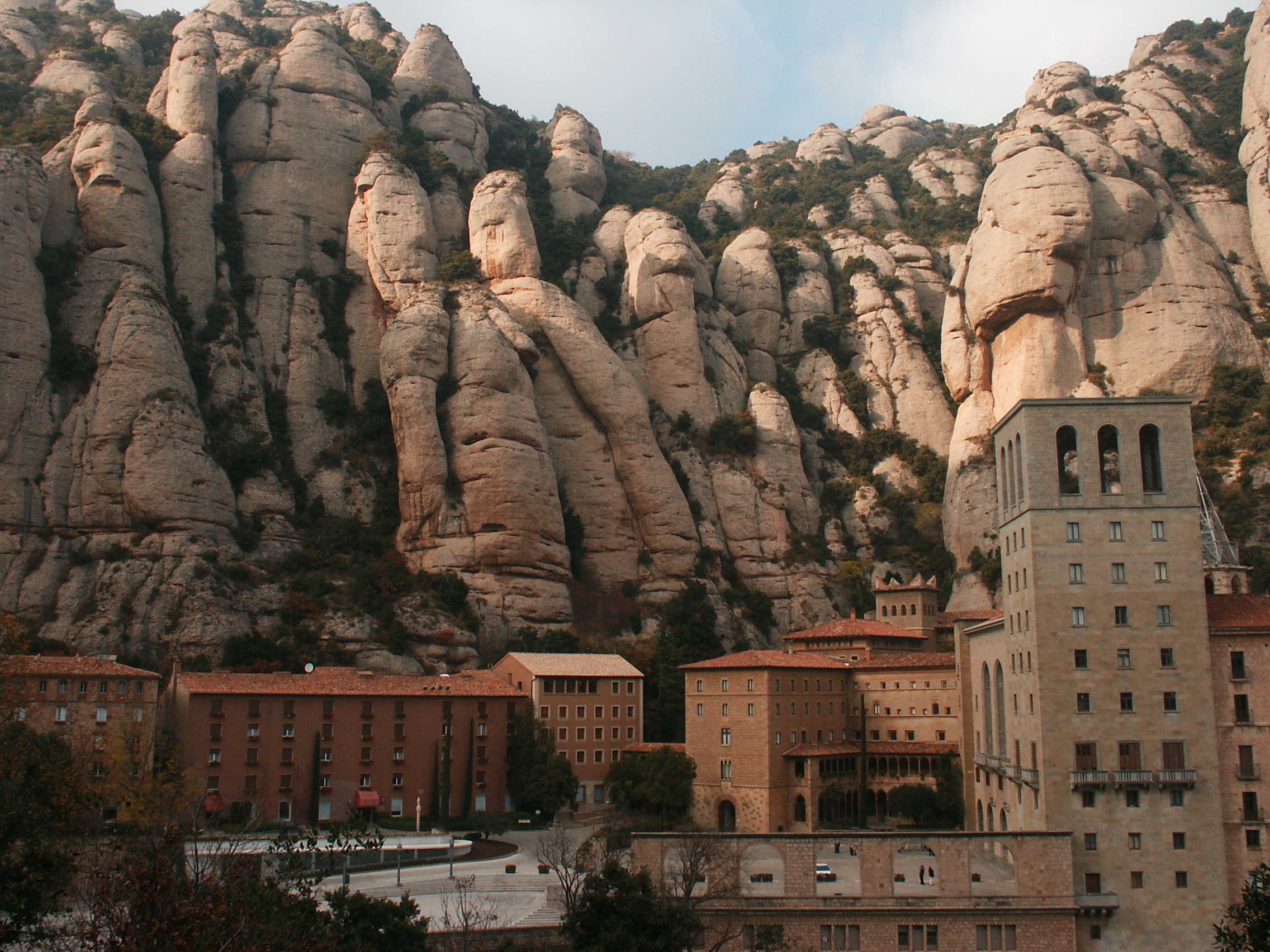
Santa Maria de Montserrat Abbey

"La Tancada d'intellectuals a Montserrat" (meeting of intellectuals in Montserrat) on 12–14 December 1970 was the main act by the anti-Francopist opposition in Catalonia in reaction to the war council in Burgos against ETA militants. On December 12, 1970, in the Abbey of Montserrat, 300 Catalan intellectuals gathered: writers, singers, journalists, painters, actors, filmmakers, thespians, editors, cultural professionals, and other people with a recognized political commitment. The meeting was intended to protest the Burgos Process, the war council that condemned ETA militants. It lasted three days under the threat of police assault. The participants debated about the current state of the country and its future, and they founded a permanent assembly, the Permanent Assembly of Catalan Intellectuals, that would work from that moment to have a prominent role in future political events. In the course of the meeting, a manifesto was drafted in which political amnesty, democratic freedoms and the right to self-determination were requested. The meeting came from two organizations opposed to the Franco regime, La Taula Rodona (1966–1973) and the Coordinating Commission of the Political Forces of Catalonia (which preceded the Council of Political Forces of Catalonia). The consequences for the participants were severe: strong economic sanctions, withdrawal of passports, prohibition to act in public, etc. The international impact of the meeting led the regime to commute death sentences.

=== Assembly of Catalonia ===
The Assembly of Catalonia was founded on November 7, 1971, in the church of Sant Agustí, Barcelona, as a unifying platform for Catalan anti-Francoism under the initiative of the Coordinator of the Political Forces of Catalonia, quickly grouping the vast majority of political parties, unions and social organizations and deriving the motto: "Freedom, Amnesty and Statute of Autonomy." Their programme was:

- For democratic rights and freedoms.
- Access of the people to economic power.
- Access of the people to political power.
- For the full exercise of the right of self-determination.

During the seventies the Assembly of Catalonia was the main framework for the coordination of resistance against the dictatorship and led and organized the main popular mobilizations of the time. Among them, the March of Liberty, in the summer of 1976.

=== Iberian Liberation Movement ===
The Movimiento Ibérico de Liberación (MIL) was a Catalan ultra-left armed group between 1971 and 1973, based mainly in Barcelona and Toulouse, France. It became famous after its dissolution because of the execution by the Francoist regime of one of its members, Salvador Puig Antich, in March 1974, and of the shooting of Oriol Solé Sugranyes during his escape in 1976.

Catalans interpreted Puig Antich's execution as symbolic retaliation for the region's fight for autonomy, which led to public demonstrations. As one of Franco's last victims, Puig Antich became a household name in Barcelona. The Internationalist Revolutionary Action Groups (GARI) formed to avenge his death.

=== De-Francoisation ===
In Catalonia, after the death of the dictator, the exterior signs ( "Avenida Francisco Franco" and "Plaza del Caudillo", etc.) of the Franco regime disappeared quickly. The first national legislation waited until the 2007 Historical Memory Law.

On November 25, 2015, Òmnium Cultural organised a condemnation of crimes of Francoism and a homage to its victims, supported by the Democratic Memorial (Generalitat de Catalunya) and the City Council of Barcelona.

== See also ==
- Francoist Spain
- History of Catalonia#Franco's dictatorship
- Catalonia#Under Franco's rule (1939–1975)
