= Gemma Humet =

Gemma Humet Alsius
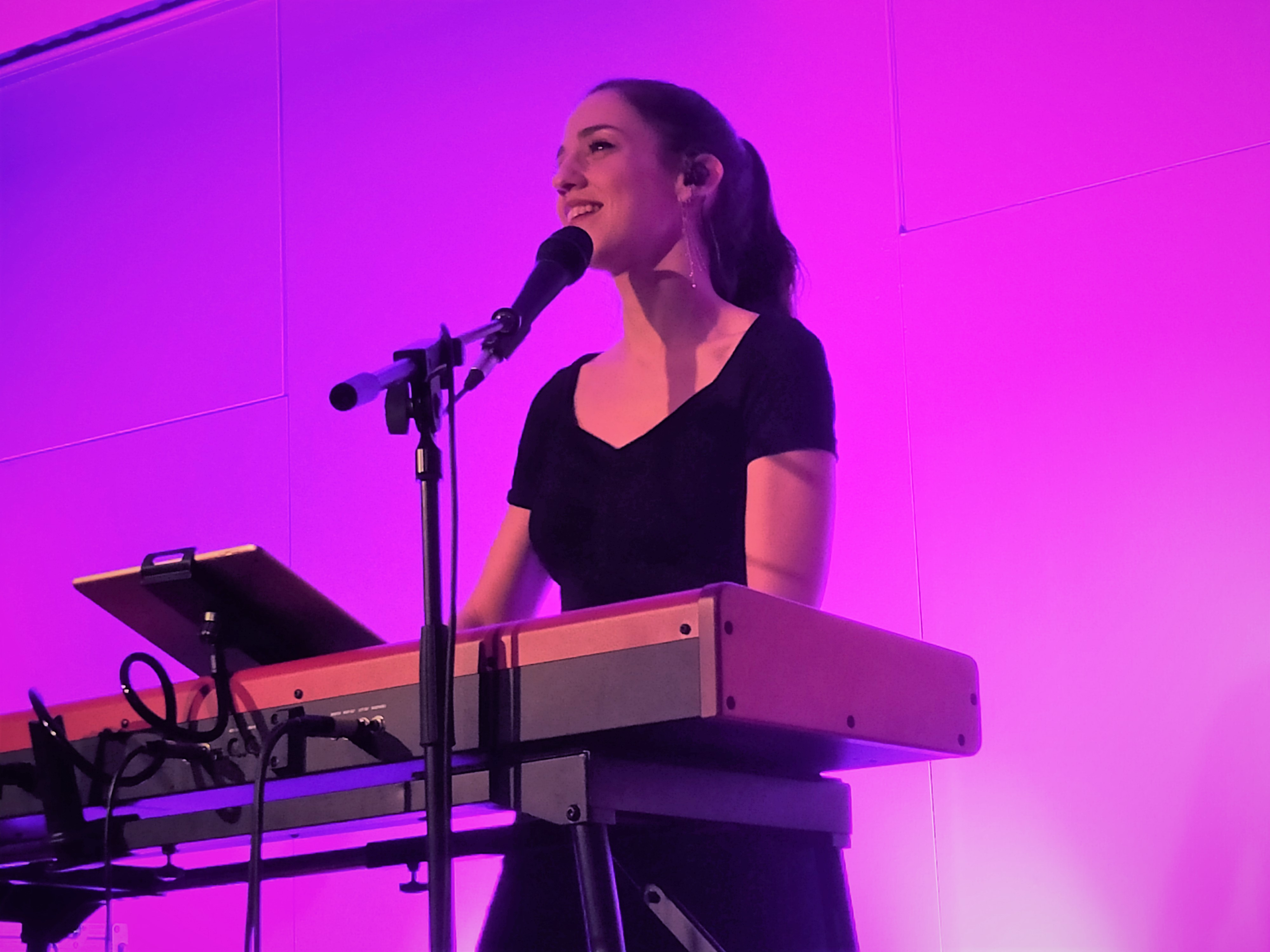
- Gemma Humet (2022)

Background information
- Born: Gemma Humet Alsius; November 19, 1988 (age 37); Terrassa, Catalonia
- Origin: Catalonia
- Occupations: Singer, Pianist
- Years active: 2012–present
- Labels: Satélite K

Gemma Humet Alsius (born 19 November 1988 in Terrassa, Catalonia) is a Catalan singer and pianist who performs in the Catalan language. She is the niece of singer Joan Baptista Humet and first cousin of Ramon Humet.

== Biography ==
She studied jazz singing at the Escola Superior de Música de Catalunya (ESMUC). In April 2015, she released her debut album, *Si canto enrere*, on the Satélite K label, produced by guitarist Pau Figueres. She regularly collaborates with guitarist Toti Soler in shows such as *Liebeslied, U, set, u, quatre: segar i batre* and *L’Ovidi, poema sense acabar* (a tribute to Ovidi Montllor) alongside actor Joan Massotkleiner. She is also known for her collaboration with guitarist Toni Xuclà, performing *Espriu, amb música ho escoltaries potser millor*, in which she set two poems by Salvador Espriu to music: “Aquesta pau és meva” and “A la vora del mar”.

In 2013 she participated in the National Day of Catalonia at the Parc de la Ciutadella, singing “Sonet”, a poem by Bartomeu Rosselló Porcel set to music by Maria del Mar Bonet. In 2015, together with Mercè Martínez, Pemi Fortuny, Albert Guinovart and the young choir of the Orfeó Català, she performed “Venim del nord, venim del sud” by Lluís Llach on the main stage of the Via Lliure in Barcelona. In 2020, she contributed to a version of “Un núvol blanc” by Lluís Llach to raise funds during the Covid‑19 pandemic.

== Discography ==
- *Si canto enrere* (2015)
- *Encara* (2017)
- *Màtria* (2020)
- *Rere tot aquest fum* (2022)
- *Temps de Canvis* (single, 2024)

== Recent activity ==
In 2024–25, Gemma Humet premiered the live show *Miralls*, directed by Lluís Danés, performing solo with piano and voice. In June 2025, she published a public letter mourning the loss of her father while continuing to tour and record.
