= Raimon =

Spanish singer

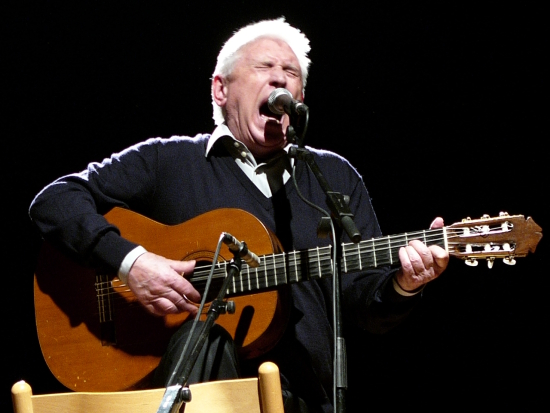
Ramon in 2008

Ramon Pelegero Sanchis, who takes the stage name of Raimon (Valencian pronunciation: [rajˈmon]), is a Spanish singer. He performs in the musical style of Nova Cançó, and in the Catalan language.

== Biography ==
=== Youth ===
Raimon was born in Xàtiva in the province of Valencia, Spain on December 2, 1940, at el carrer Blanc (White Street), which he references in some songs. In his youth he worked for several years as a radio broadcaster in his hometown, absorbing the music of artists as diverse as Juliette Gréco, The Platters, and Juanito Valderrama.

At age 21, he moved to Valencia in order to study history. It was there that he discovered Valencian culture, and read writers such as Ausiàs March, Salvador Espriu, Josep Pla, and Joan Fuster, among others. Prior to this, however, he had already written his first song, Al vent (To the wind).

In 1962, Raimon made his first public appearance at a literary prize ceremony. A little later, after entering a contest in Castelló, where Els Setze Jutges participated, he sang for them. Josep Maria Espinàs was impressed and invited him to Barcelona for the Fòrum Vergés. His success was immediate. Raimon surprised with the form and content of his songs. His urgent texts spoke of a rebellious existentialism; his style departed from the "French style" of Els Setze Jutges and offered a vision of the world tied not to the life of the Barcelona bourgeois in which musicians like Espinàs, Delfí Abella, and Enric Barbat lived, but rather to the Valencian working classes. His first EP appeared quickly on Catalan record label Edigsa in 1963; it included the songs Al vent, Som, La pedra, and A colps, and became a great sales success.

=== The Francoist era ===
During this period of success, he received a surprising proposal: to sing at the Festival de la Canción Mediterránea with a song in Catalan. Initially reticent, Raimon eventually accepted "per voluntat de servei al país i a la llengua" (as an act of service to the country and the language). Raimon, without a guitar, sang, together with Salomé, who gave a feminine interpretation of the love song Se'n va anar by Josep Maria Andreu and Lleó Borrell. The song, voted by the public, won first prize. From that moment, Catalan song, considered up to then a minority phenomenon of little consequence, began to receive the attention of the censors and of the institutions of the Franquistas, with the host of prohibitions that accompanied them.

Immediately thereafter, Raimon's second EP appeared, with Se'n va anar and three other tunes: the existential Disset anys, Cançó del capvespre (Raimon's first setting of a poem of Salvador Espriu) and Ahir, quickly known by its subtitle Diguem no, which would for many years be sung with altered lyrics that softened its overtly political message. Much later, Raimon confessed that he wanted to put Se'n va anar and Diguem no together because, if they banned the disc, they would ban the both of them.

In 1964 a third EP appeared, which featured the songs D'un temps d'un país and Cançó de les mans. That same year, his first LP saw light, a live album containing versions of the majority of his previously released songs and two new tunes, Si em mor and Cantarem la vida. In 1965, Raimon sang for the first time in Barcelona without Els Setze Jutges or other singers: his first solo recital took place in the Aliança del Poble Nou. The same year he began his international activities at the university at Leuven in Belgium. He published an EP with four love songs dedicated to the woman who would become his wife the following year. The songs were En tu estime el món, Treballaré el teu cos, Si un dia vols and No sé com.

In 1965, his historic open-air performance at the Institut Químic de Sarrià took place, the first true massive act of Catalan song; he also made his first appearances in Paris and Germany. The album Cançons de la roda del temps appeared that year, with a painting by Joan Miró on the cover. The music was centered around the book El caminant i el mur by Espriu, twelve poems which recall the solar cycle and the life cycle of man, to which Raimon added a concluding song of character more civic than metaphysical, Inici de càntic en el temple.

In France he released an album recorded live on June 7 at the Olympia, which won the Francis Carco award the following year for best foreign song, granted by the Académie du Disque Français. Unreleased versions of some songs censored in Spain appeared on this disc.

In 1967 he performed at the Teatre Romea, the first recital of a Catalan singer there. He also performed in Cuba, Switzerland, and other countries. A concert in Barcelona at the Palau de la Música Catalana on January 28 was released as a live album, Raimon Palau, with 12 songs. A last EP followed that same year.

In 1968 he released his first disc with Discophon, the song Indesinenter (a setting of a poem of Espriu). This same year he had two more historic recitals, one at the Price labor movement festival and the other at the Faculty of Economics in Madrid. He also performed in Mexico, Germany, Switzerland, and Cuba that year. The next year, he returned to the Paris Olympia, and another LP was released solely in France.

After another single, which included his first setting of Ausias March, Veles e vents, he released the disc Per destruir aquell qui l'ha desert in 1970, arranged by Lleó Borrell and with cover art by Antoni Tàpies. Side A was dedicated to settings of 15th century Catalan poets: the poem Desert d'amics (the original name, Presoner, was forbidden by the censors), by Jordi de Sant Jordi; a fragment of the Llibre dels bons amonestaments, of Anselm Turmeda, titled Elogi dels diners, and four poems of Ausiàs March: Veles e vents, Així com cell, Quins tan segurs consells and Si com lo taur. Side B featured Indesinenter and five songs written by Raimon: Societat de consum (one of his few songs with an ironic treatment), Quan creus que ja s'acaba, De nit a casa, T'ho devia and Sobre la pau.

In 1971 he released another LP with included 13 de març, cançó dels creients and the love song Quan te'n vas. Other releases appeared in France, the U.S. and Uruguay, and he toured in Uruguay, Chile, and Argentina. The following two years he released further international discs and gave hundreds of live shows. In 1973 he published the book Poemes i cançons, with a prologue by Manuel Sacristán.

In 1974 the album A Victor Jara was released, collaborating with a number of avant-garde French musicians like Michel Portal. It includes some settings, of Ausias March (No em pren així, Lo jorn ha por), Joan Roís de Corella (Si en lo mal temps), Joan Timoneda (So qui so) and Pere Quart (Una vaca amb un vedellet en braços). Raimon's originals were T'he conegut sempre igual, a song about secrecy written as a result of his fortuitous encounter with the persecuted Gregori López i Raimundo; Molt lluny, a nostalgic revisitation of adolescence; Morir en aquesta vida, a rejection of suicide which contains a literal citation of Mayakovsky; Amb tots els petits vicis, about being in one's thirties; and the sober love song Com un puny. It was dedicated to Victor Jara, Chilean singer assassinated by the Pinochet government in September 1973.

This same year, two more albums appeared; the first in France, T'adores, amic, had several songs banned in Spain. The other, Campus de Bellaterra, was recorded live at a performance at the Universitat Autònoma de Barcelona. Many of the songs had strong social/political overtones: Qui ja ho sap tot, A un amic, 18 de maig a la Villa, No em mou al crit, Quan jo vaig nàixer, and the poem of Espriu, dedicated to Pompeu Fabra, El meu poble i jo.

In 1975, while Franco ailed, Raimon sang at the Palau dels Esports de Barcelona, where he debuted one of his classics, Jo vinc d'un silenci.

=== The democratic era ===
The following year, during the optimism preceding democratic rule, he sang in the sports pavilion of Real Madrid on April 1. This was originally to be the first of four concerts, but the final three were cancelled. The performance was captured on a double album, El recital de Madrid. In the spring of this same year, he appeared for the first and only time at the Sis Hores de Cançó in Canet de Mar. More than sixty thousand people filled the Pla d'en Sala de Canet. During Raimon's performance, while he performed the song Inici de càntic en el temple, a crane elevated an enormous Catalan flag on the side of the stage.

From this moment, Raimon dedicated much effort to avoiding irrelevance as a resistance artist. Despite making four appearances at the Palacio de los Deportes de Barcelona in 1977, he began to steer clear of large concerts and stayed away from organized actions for political parties. Also, he began to play accompanied by a double bass, before assembling a full backing group. Up until then, Raimon always had played solo, with his guitar.

Before touring Japan for the first time in 1977 he released the album Lliurament del cant, which combined settings of Joan Timoneda (Bella, de vós so enamorós, Qui té anguila per la cua), Espriu (Potser arran de l'alba), and some of his own texts: Qui pregunta ja respon, Un lleu tel d'humitat, Tristesa el nom, Com una mà, Que tothom, A Joan Miró (not exactly a new song, but hitherto not released in Spain), and a studio version of Jo vinc d'un silenci.

Two years later, in 1979, a new album appeared, Quan l'aigua es queixa, assembled from six concerts in the Palau de la Música Catalana. It includes poems of Espriu (Nous cants de llibertat and the ironic swing I beg your pardon), Ausiàs March (Si em demanau and On és lo lloc), and his own texts: Als matins a ciutat, L'última llum, Un sol consell, No el coneixia de res, Fou un infant, Perquè ningú no em contarà els seus somnis, I després de creure tant Andreu, amic, dedicated to the sculptor Andreu Alfaro. This album displayed a maturation in his poetic style.

In order to regroup all his work, in 1981 he re-recorded all his songs with new arrangements by Manel Camp and Antoni Ros Marbà. The result was a set of ten discs, whose songs were grouped thematically: Orígens, Cançons d'amor, Ausiàs March, Dedicatòries, Cançons de la roda del temps (Espriu), He mirat aquesta terra (Espriu), Poetes dels segles XV i XVI, Amb els silencis i les nostres paraules and L 'aigua del temps que vius. The tenth disc, Testimonis, is dedicated to live recordings and includes a version of Al vent sung in Japanese by a choir from that country. The only unreleased songs incorporated in Raimon. otes les cançons were some settings of Joan Roís de Corella, Joan Timoneda, Ausiàs March and Espriu.

In 1983 he released Les hores guanyades, which included his thoughts on the political scene (including the failed coup d'etat of February 23), the life of the artist and many other themes. From this moment, Raimon appeared rarely in public and made few recordings. He released a new album in 1984, Entre la nota i el so, with songs like Lluny de la pedra i de l'aigua and Al meu país la pluja.

The following album (Presències i oblit, 1987) marked a brief experimentation with electronic music and with instruments like a drum kit and a synthesizer (with arrangements made by the percussionist Ezequiel Guillén Saki). On this disc are songs of a markedly intimate character: Del blanc i el blau, La mar respira calma (written in the style of Espriu), Primer parlaré de tu, etc. At the presentation of the album at the Palau de la Música Catalana, Raimon performed for the first time almost entirely without using the guitar, gesturing to great effect during the concert.

Raimon then took exactly a decade to record an album of new songs, but this was not a time of inactivity; he formed a stable group of accompanying musicians on the guitar, double bass, cello and accordion - and performed together with them as well as solo, under conditions he found artistically preferable.

In 1992 he toured Japan again, and also sang in various universities in the United States. The same year, he surprised many by making an appearance on Literal, a program on TVE-Catalunya dedicated to the world of literature.

On Saint George's day 1993, a large concert took place in the Palau Sant Jordi in Barcelona, before some eighteen thousand spectators, to celebrate the thirtieth anniversary of the release of Al vent. Raimon sang many songs, but also on stage were many artists who had shared experiences with him over many years: the Uruguayan Daniel Vigiletti, the Basque Mikel Laboa, the Portuguese Luis Cilia, the American folk singer Pete Seeger, and others. Catalan guests included Serrat (a former rival, but reconciled friend), Ovidi Montllor, and Pi de la Serra. Also in attendance were the Japanese group Warabi-za, the Coral Sant Jordi directed by Oriol Martorell and the band La Lira Ampostina.

The same year a new Complete Works was released, this time on CD. The work, which won the Palmarès des Palmarès given by the Nouvelle Académie du Disque Français, collected a total of 121 songs divided into the following: Orígens i dedicatòries, Cançons d'amor i de lluita, Cançons de la roda del temps i d'altres poemes de Salvador Espriu, Ausiàs March i alguns poemes dels segles XV i XVI, Aquest cant vol ser plural and Coincidències, dissidències, indecències i algunes rareses, the last being dedicated to live recordings.

In early 1997 a new album finally appeared, Cançons de mai with arrangements by Manel Camp. It consisted of seven settings of Ausiàs March and six of his own poems, including the ironic Soliloqui solipsista, which was accompanied by a video clip.

That same year he was granted the Gold Medal (Medalla de Oro) of the Generalitat de Catalunya. Under the title Cançons de mai. Cançons de sempre, Raimon made appearances in Perpignan, Xàtiva, Mallorca, and in the Palau de la Música Catalana. He also toured Britain. He was heckled at Madrid's Plaza de las Ventas bullring, where he sang a homage to Miguel Ángel Blanco, assassinated by ETA. Some of the public criticised his singing in Catalan, which he publicly avowed by singing Valencian dialect of Catalan, and the fact that the song País Basc was prohibited in Francoist Spain. The act was rebroadcast on TVE, and provoked great controversy.

At the end of 1997 the CD Recitals al Palau was released and in 1999 he published a compilation of all his love songs, Les cançons d'amor. In 2000, he published a new Complete Works with many unreleased songs, settings of 15th century authors: Francí Guerau, Jordi de Sant Jordi, Mossèn Estanya, Bernat Metge and Jaume Roig. The new complete works also included the only two songs he recorded written by other songwriters: Se'n va anar and Amanda.

During 2020, during a solemn act in the Palau de la Generalitat Valenciana a contract was ceded by Raimon to cede all their belongings and heritage to their natal town.

== Discography ==
- 1964: Disc antològic de les seves cançons
- 1966: Raimon a l'Olympia
- 1966: Cançons de la roda del temps
- 1967: Raimon al Palau
- 1967: Raimon música sola
- 1968: Raimon en directe
- 1969: Raimon a Montserrat
- 1969: Sobre la pau. Contra la por (Olympia 2)
- 1970: Per destruir aquell qui l'ha desert
- 1971: Raimon
- 1971: Raimon en Montevideo
- 1971: Raimon. Catalonian protest songs
- 1972: En vivo
- 1972: Diguem no
- 1972: La noche
- 1974: A Víctor Jara
- 1974: Campus de Bellaterra
- 1974: T'adones amic...?
- 1976: El recital de Madrid
- 1977: Lliurament del cant
- 1979: Quan l'aigua es queixa
- 1981: Totes les cançons
- 1984: Entre la nota i el so
- 1985: Raimon canta
- 1987: Presències i oblit
- 1989: Canta Ausiàs March
- 1993: Integral
- 1993: Cançons
- 1995: I després de creure tant
- 1997: Ausiàs March / Raimon
- 1997: Cançons de mai
- 1997: Recitals al Palau
- 1999: Dotze cançons
- 1999: Les cançons d'amor
- 2000: Nova Integral 2000
- 2003: Clàssics i no
- 2003: Raimon-Espriu Poesia cantada
- 2006: Raimon a l'Olympia (1966–2006)

== Bibliography ==
- Mainat, Joan Ramon: Tretze que canten. Editorial Mediterránea, 1982.
- Pomar, Jaume: Raimon, colección Los Juglares, Ediciones Jucar, Madrid, 1983.
- Pujadó, Miquel: Diccionari de la Cançó. D'Els Setze Jutges al Rock Català, April 2000.
- Escamilla, David: Raimon. L´art de la memòria. Editorial Planeta, 2004.
- Batista, Antoni: Raimon. La construcció d´un cant and Raimon. La construcción de un canto. Ediciones La Magrana. RBA, 2005. In Catalan and Spanish.
