= Sis Hores de Cançó =

The Sis Hores de Cançó in Canet de Mar was a mass festival of Catalan singing in a time when Catalan, as a language and as a culture, was somehow persecuted by the Spanish Francoist dictatorship. The embryo of this festival can be found in an event that Agrupament Escolta dels Pioners from Canet de Mar organized in the local tennis club court in August 1969. Their leader was Joan Ramon Mainat, brother of Josep Maria Mainat, one of the three members of a hugely popular Catalan band called La Trinca. Most of the greatest Catalan singers involved in the struggle to gain acknowledgment of Catalan as an official language performed there: Lluís Llach, Ovidi Montllor i Francesc Pi de la Serra. Attendance was about 500 people. In April 1970 they organized another concert, which gathered more people.

The first edition of Sis Hores de Cançó took place on 18 September 1971. This time more singers took part and attendance went up to 1,800.

The audience increased progressively in the following editions, 2,500 in 1972, and 5,000 in 1973.

Between 1974 and 1978, Pebrots Enterprises, with La Trinca behind it, was in charge of the organization. This change was imposed by the fact that the Spanish Civil Government denied the legality of Agrupament Escolta dels Pioners. In this 1974 edition, with 15,000 espectators, a youth called frncsc was arrested for giving out political pamphlets and Joan Ramon Mainat and Toni Cruz, another member of La Trinca, were held by the Guàrdia Civil for 12 hours.

In 1975, in front of 15,000 rapturous youth and slipping past censorship (it must be said that the Spanish Francoism was coming to an end), Rafael Subirachs sang the popular Catalan anthem Els Segadors.

The main singers that took part in Sis Hores de Cançó were La Trinca, Toti Soler, Maria del Mar Bonet, Francesc Pi de la Serra and Ovidi Montllor, who was the only one that performed there in every edition. Raimon only performed in 1976.

== Bibliography ==
- Mainat, Joan Ramon (2018). Canet: 36 (+12) hores de cançó i de llibertat (in Catalan). Barcelona: Grup Enderock.
- Pujadó, Miquel (2000). Diccionari de la Cançó. D'Els Setze Jutges al Rock Català (in Catalan). Barcelona: Enciclopèdia catalana. ISBN 8441204675.
- Saiz i Xiqués, Carles (2004). "Les sis hores de cançó a Canet". El Sot de l'Aubó (7): 4–21. ISSN 2014-5969.
- Soldevila i Balasrt, Llorenç (1993). La Nova cançó (1958-1987) : balanç d'una acció cultural (in Catalan). L'Aixernador. ISBN 9788486332945.
