= Josep Espar i Ticó =

Catalan businessperson (1927–2022)

- Born: 22 December 1927; Barcelona
- Died: 20 August 2022 (aged 94); Barcelona
- Occupations: Businessman, politician and cultural activist
- Known for: Catalan cultural activism

Josep Espar i Ticó (22 December 1927 – 20 August 2022) was a Catalan businessman, politician and cultural activist.

== Biography ==
In 1950 he graduated in law from the University of Barcelona. In 1954 he joined the group CC, formed by post-war pro-Catalanism Catholic people. On 19 May 1960, he was one of the promoters of the Events of the Palau de la Música, in which, in a tribute to the poet Joan Maragall in the midst of the Francoist dictatorship, the public began to sing the Cant de la senyera, a song that became the substitute of Catalonia's anthem Els segadors, then banned. Previously he had also been involved in the Galinsoga affair.

In 1961 he was one of the founders of the Edigsa, a record label that promoted Nova Cançó. One year later, he promoted Ona bookstore in 1962, a bookstore promoting books in Catalan. Afterwards, he took part in the "We want Catalan bishops" campaign and in the Congress of Catalan Culture, of which he was manager (1975–1977) and member of its board of trustees. In 1974 he was one of the founders of the political party Democratic Convergence of Catalonia. He ran for the Senate of Spain for Convergence and Union in the 1979 Spanish general election but was not elected.

Later, Espar participated in the creation in 1976 of the newspaper Avui, the first in Catalan language newspaper after the defeat of the Spanish Civil War, the children's magazine Cavall Fort and the publishing house L'Arc de Berà. In 1984 he received the Creu de Sant Jordi Award, from the Generalitat de Catalunya. From 1984 to 1986 he was general secretary of the II International Congress of the Catalan Language.

He actively participated in the Collective for a good TGV route created in 2007, which tried to get the route of the high-speed train to avoid the temple of the Sagrada Família in Barcelona. One of his last battles was to push forward the Third Catalanist Congress 2008–2009, which he considered indispensable. In 2020, the Catalan Summer University awarded him the Canigó Award.

He died in Barcelona on 20 August 2022, in Barcelona, at the age of 94. Firstly was reported by the Fundació Congrés de Cultura Catalana, an organization of which he was a patron for life, after having been at the head of many initiatives aimed at the political and cultural normalization of the country.

== See also ==
- Francoist Catalonia
