= Delfí Abella =

Spanish writer and psychiatrist

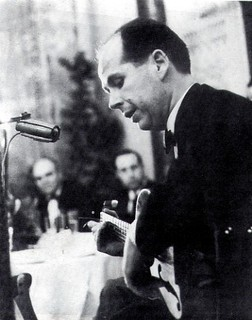
Delfí Abella i Gibert

Delfí Abella i Gibert (Catalan pronunciation: [dəlˈfi əˈβɛʎəj ʒiˈβɛɾt]; February 2, 1925 – February 1, 2007) was a Catalan psychiatrist, essayist and songwriter.

A medical psychiatrist by profession, he was head of the Department of Psychiatry at the Hospital de Santa Creu i Sant Pau, professor of psychiatry at the Universitat Autònoma de Barcelona, and author of works on psychiatry.

In 1961, Abella became one of the earliest members of the Nova Cançó group Els Setze Jutges. He released three EPs as a member of the group, recording twelve songs in total. Abella's Catalan-language adaptations of songs by French chanson singers including Barbara, Anne Sylvestre, and Guy Béart were performed and recorded by some of the younger members of the Els Setze Jutges: Maria del Mar Bonet, Guillermina Motta, Maria Amèlia Pedrerol, and Joan Manuel Serrat. Els Setze Jutges received the Medal of Honor from the Parliament of Catalonia in April 2007. Abella's widow accepted the award in his place.

== Published works ==
- Mossèn Cinto vist del psiquiatre Anàlisi psico-patològica dels articles "en defensa pròpia", 1958
- Tòtems actuals i altres assaigs (Contemporary totems and other essays). 1960
- El Nostre caràcter (Our [Catalans] character), 1961
- L'orientació antropològica existencial de la psiquiatria (The anthropological and existential orientation of psychiatry), 1962
- Estudio clínico y fenomenológico de la hipocondría (Clinical and phenomenological study of hypochondria), 1962
- Què cal saber d'higiene mental (What it is necessary to know about mental hygiene), 1963
- Geni i catalanitat de Ramon Llull (Genius and Catalanism of Ramon Llull), 1964
- Psiquiatria fonamental (Fundamentals of psychiatry), 1981
- Trenta cançons (Thirty songs) (poetry), 1998.

== Discography with Els Setze Jutges ==
- Canta les seves cançons, 1962
- Cançó del turista, 1963
- Barbaritats d'avui, 1965
