= Bartomeu Rosselló-Pòrcel =

Spanish Balearic poet

Bartomeu Rosselló-Pòrcel (Catalan pronunciation: [bəɾtuˈmɛw rusəˈʎo ˈpɔɾsəl]; 3 August 1913 in Palma, Majorca – 5 January 1938 in El Brull, Barcelona) was a Spanish Balearic poet, who wrote in Catalan. He was born to a modest family and completed his secondary school education as a student of Gabriel Alomar i Villalong in l'Institut de Palma.

He completed his bachelor's degree in arts and philosophy in Barcelona where he met his lifelong friend and renowned Catalan poet, Salvador Espriu. Rosselló-Pòrcel dedicated 'Imitació del Foc' to Espriu. He completed his PhD degree in Madrid. In 1933, he embarked on a university Mediterranean cruise with Espriu and two of his other colleagues, touring Egypt, Lebanon, Greece, Rhodes, and Palestine. When in Palestine, he and Espriu heard what may have been the last records of Qatalanit, a Jewish diasporic language also known as Judeo-Catalan. In the final days of his trip, he fell ill with tuberculosis. He died of tuberculosis at the age of 24.

== Works ==
- Nou poemes (Nine poems) 1933
- Quadern de sonets (Notebook of sonnets) 1934
- Imitació del foc (Imitation of fire), 1938

His works were greatly influenced by the Mallorcan literary movement of l'Escola Mallorquina, though he was also influenced by other tendencies such as surrealism and neopopularism, similar to that of Spanish writers Rafael Alberti or Federico García Lorca.
