= L'Estaca =

Song by Lluís Llach
- Language: Catalan
- English title: The Stake
- Written: 1968
- Genre: Nova cançó
- Songwriter: Lluís Llach

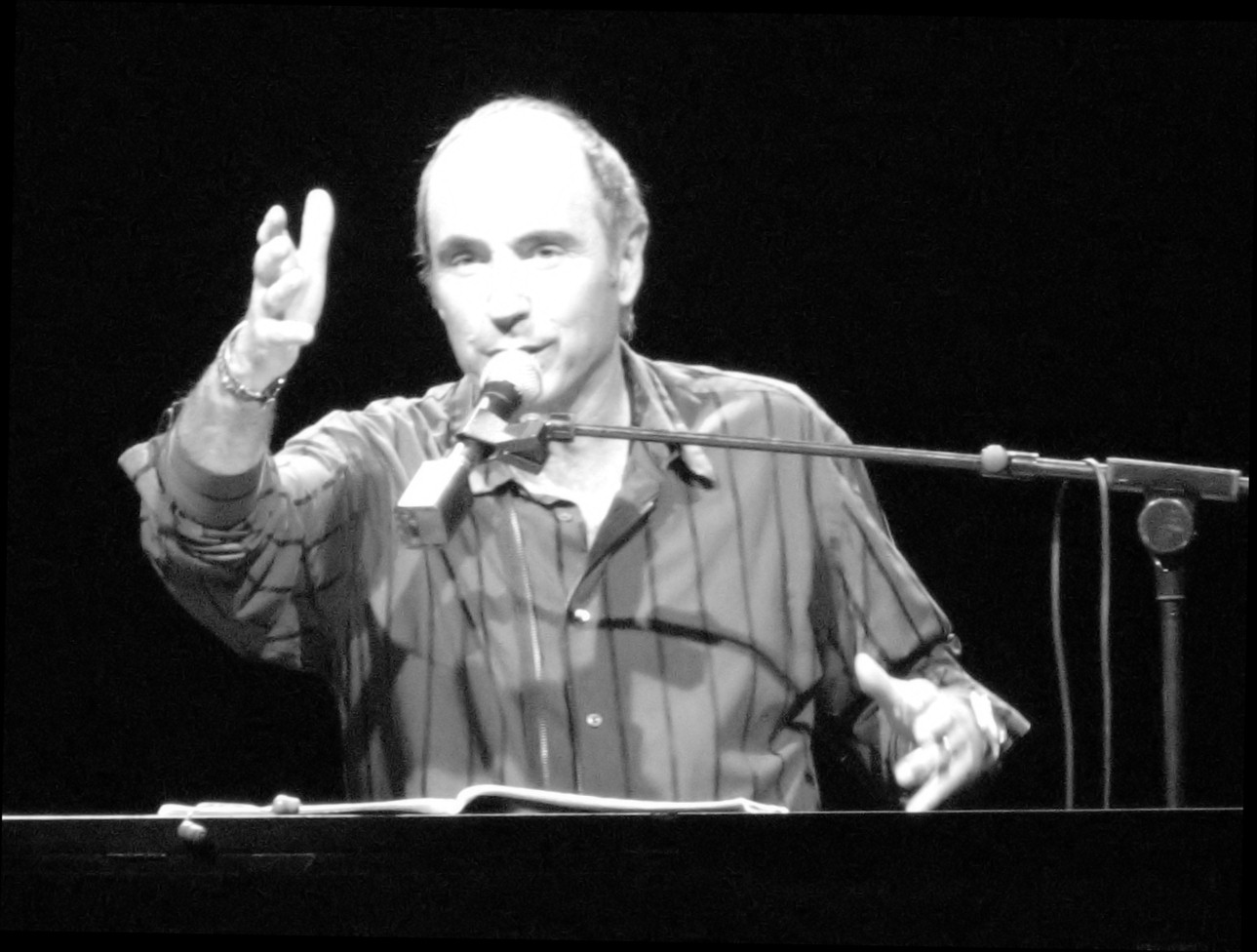
Lluís Llach

L'Estaca (Catalan pronunciation: [ləsˈtakə]; meaning "the stake", figurative sense "without liberty") is a song composed by the Catalan singer-songwriter Lluís Llach in 1968.

The song, which has been translated into several languages, has become so popular in some countries that it is erroneously considered to be a locally written song. It was composed during the dictatorship of caudillo Franco in Spain and is a call for unity of action to achieve freedom. The song has become a symbol of the fight for freedom everywhere.

Polish singer-songwriter Jacek Kaczmarski was inspired to write new lyrics to the melody of L'Estaca after hearing the song on one of several Spanish records he borrowed from a friend in December 1978. The result was Mury, which became one of his most famous compositions after it was adopted by the Polish trade union Solidarność and sung at countless rallies, meetings, protests and strikes throughout Poland during the 1980s. Later, a Belarusian language adaptation of the Polish version became a symbol of the 2020 Belarusian protests.

Lakadjina and Yasser Jeradi made a version of the song that became the anthem of the Tunisian Revolution in 2011.

L'Estaca is also an anthem for the supporters of the rugby team USAP, of Perpignan in Northern Catalonia, in France.

The song was covered in Yiddish (under the title "Der Yokh") by the American klezmer band, The Klezmatics, in their 2016 album Apikorsim.

The song was also sung in Bilbao in Basque on September 16, 2017 in support of Catalonia's Referendum on Independence scheduled for October 1, 2017 before a crowd of 32,000.

In October 2020, as part of a protest movement against the Israeli Prime Minister Benjamin Netanyahu, L'Estaca was translated to Hebrew and performed by the artistic narrator and radio broadcaster Benny Hendel. The clip, produced by Hendel and Yoni Haimovich and directed by Michael (Muki) Hadar, was uploaded to YouTube.

== Lyrics ==
The lyrics describe the struggle for freedom using a metaphor of being tied to a stake, itself a metaphor for Francoist Spain.

The song is a conversation held in a doorway at dawn, where the main character asks Grandfather Siset "Don't you see the stake that we're all tied to? If we can't take it down, we'll never be able to walk." and the old man tells him that the only way to get free is by working together: "If we all pull, it will fall down. If I pull this way and you pull that way, it will surely fall, fall, fall, and we will be able to liberate ourselves."

The struggle for freedom is hard, it is never over, there is no rest.

Llach says that when he originally composed the song, he used the word 'column' instead of 'stake'.
