= Lluís Serrahima =

Spanish singer (1931–2020)

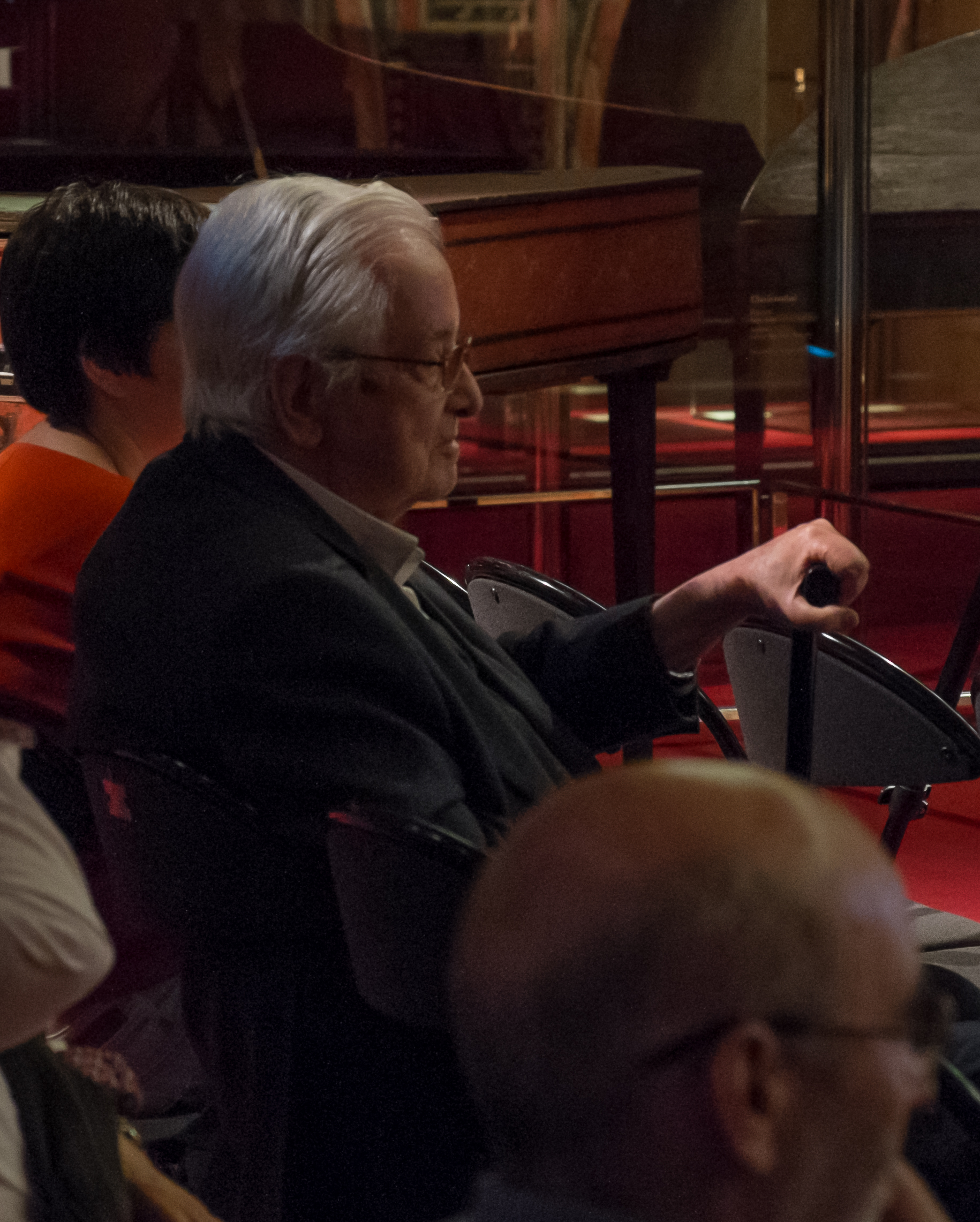
Lluís Serrahima

Lluís Serrahima i Villavecchia (19 August 1931 – 26 July 2020) was a Spanish singer-songwriter. Born in Barcelona, he was known as the founder of the Nova Cançó, a music genre that became popular during the Francisco Franco regime. In the 1980s, he became vocal in the Generalitat de Catalunya.

Serrahima died on 26 July 2020 in Barcelona, aged 88.
