= Els Setze Jutges =

Group of Catalan singer-songwriters

- Origin: Catalonia, Spain
- Genres: Nova cançó
- Years active: 1961–1968
- Past members: Miquel Porter i Moix; Remei Margarit; Josep Maria Espinàs; Delfí Abella; Francesc Pi de la Serra; Enric Barbat; Xavier Elies; Guillermina Motta; Maria del Carme Girau; Martí Llauradó; Joan Ramon Bonet; Maria Amèlia Pedrerol; Joan Manuel Serrat; Maria del Mar Bonet; Rafael Subirachs; Lluís Llach

Els Setze Jutges (Catalan pronunciation: [əls ˈsɛdzə ˈʒudʒəs], meaning "The Sixteen Judges") was a group of singers in the Catalan language founded in 1961 by Miquel Porter i Moix, Remei Margarit, and Josep Maria Espinàs. The name comes from a well known tongue-twister in the Catalan language: Setze jutges d'un jutjat mengen fetge d'un penjat ("Sixteen judges of a court eat liver off a hangman").

The mission of the group was to promote the Nova Cançó movement and to normalize the use of Catalan in the world of modern music. They started out singing their own songs and Catalan versions of songs by French singers, especially Georges Brassens. From the original three members, the circle grew to sixteen: Delfí Abella, Francesc Pi de la Serra, Enric Barbat, Xavier Elies, Guillermina Motta, Maria del Carme Girau, Martí Llauradó, Maria Amèlia Pedrerol, Joan Ramon Bonet, Joan Manuel Serrat, Maria del Mar Bonet, Lluís Llach, and Rafael Subirachs.

Els Setze Jutges began to dissolve at the end of the dictatorship and with the progressive professionalization of some of the group's members. With the appearance of professional Catalan-language singers, many of the group's earlier members, such as Miquel Porter i Moix and Josep Maria Espinàs, decided to retire from music. By the time the group ceased to exist in 1968, several of its members – most notably Serrat, but also Llach, Maria del Mar Bonet, Pi de la Serra, Barbat, Motta and Subirachs – had begun to enjoy success as individual musicians.

On 13 April 2007, the group of singers received the Medal of Honor of the Parliament of Catalonia, in recognition of their work in favor of Catalan culture and language during the dictatorship. However, Maria del Mar Bonet used the occasion to criticize the lack of promotion of Catalan-language songs in the media during the three decades since the Spanish transition to democracy, and Guillermina Motta declined to attend the ceremony, objecting that the distinction was awarded too late, when two of the sixteen had already died: Miquel Porter in 2004 and Delfí Abella in February 2007.

== See also ==
- Nova Cançó
