= Josep Maria Espinàs =

Spanish writer and journalist (1927–2023)

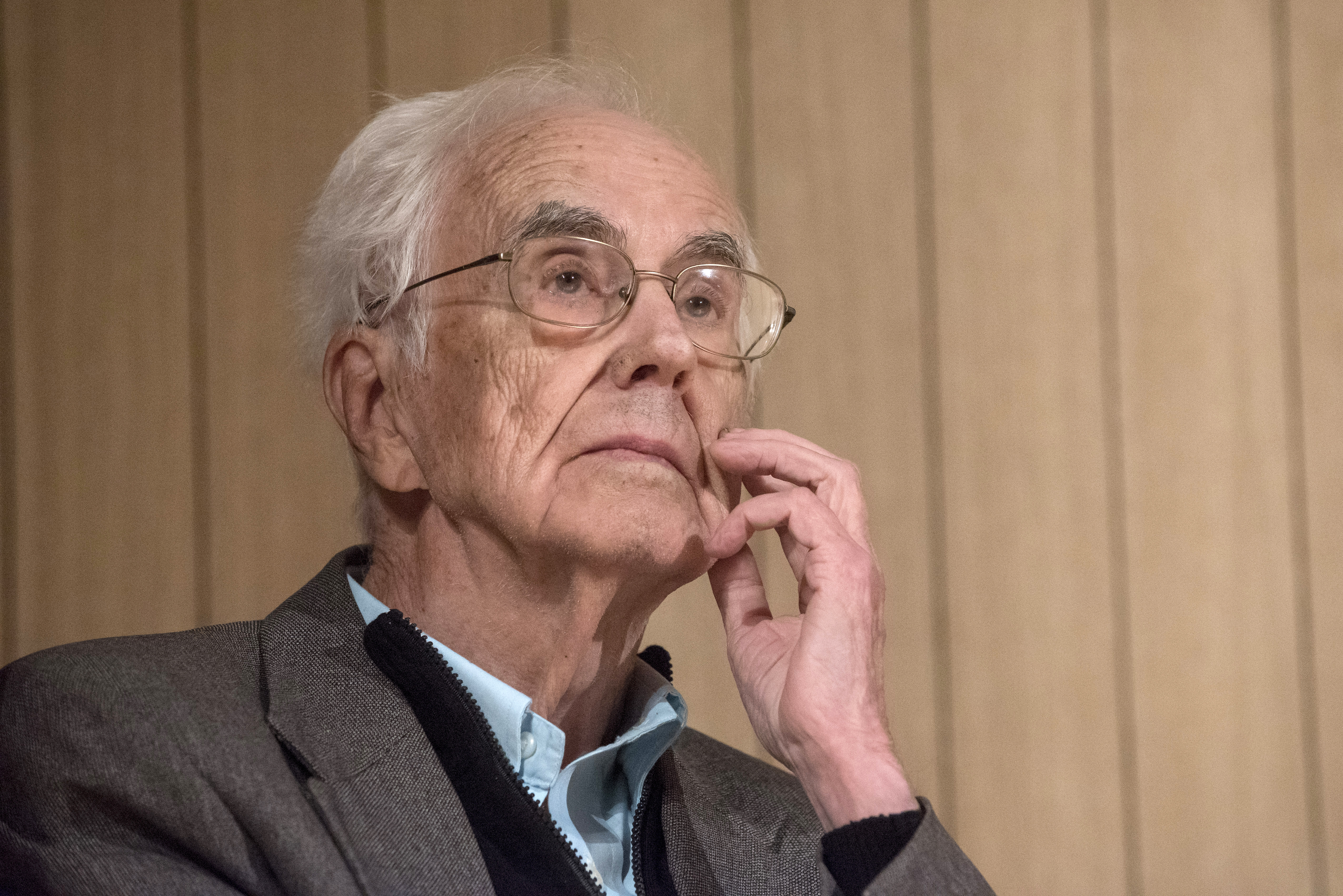
- Born: Barcelona
- Died: 5 February 2023; Barcelona
- Occupations: Journalist, writer, jurist
- Awards: Creu de Sant Jordi (1983); premi Trajectòria (1999); Premi Amics de la Gent Gran (2011)

Josep Maria Espinàs Massip (Catalan pronunciation: [ʒuˈzɛb məˈɾi.ə əspiˈnas]; 7 March 1927 – 5 February 2023) was a Catalan writer, journalist and publisher known for his novels, travel writing and newspaper articles.

Author of an extensive body of literature, Espinàs was honored with the Premi d'Honor de les Lletres Catalanes in 2002, the Premi Joanot Martorell, the Premi Sant Jordi and the Premi Víctor Català. In the 1960s he played a key role in the development of the Nova Cançó movement, co-founding the musical group Els Setze Jutges. Espinàs cowrote, with Jaume Picas, the lyrics to the official anthem of FC Barcelona, El Cant del Barça.

== Biography ==
Espinàs was born on 7 March 1927 in the city of Barcelona. He studied at Piarists schools until 1945, when he entered the School of Law of the Universitat de Barcelona, earning his degree in 1949. That same year he won the Guimerà prize with his first article. He practiced as an attorney until 1955, when he joined the publishing house Editorial Destino.

In 1983, he was awarded the Creu de Sant Jordi.

Espinàs was cofounder of the publishing house La Campana. He traveled extensively on foot through rural areas of Catalonia and other parts of Spain, publishing books about many of these voyages, and also traveled on foot through much of Europe, Israel, India, Nepal, Thailand, Malaysia, Hong Kong, Japan, and the United States.

Espinàs died on February 5, 2023 at the age of 95.

== Literary career ==
In 1953 he became known as a writer when he obtained the Joanot Martorell Prize for the novel Com ganivets o flames. From this point he began to enjoy success as an author with Dotze bumerangs (1954) i El gandul (1955). With Tots som iguals (1956), which appeared in English translation in the United States in 1961 as By nature equal, he gained international recognition, earning critical acclaim from the New York Herald Tribune, The New York Times, and The Washington Post and the magazine Book of the Month.

In 1961 he won the Premi Sant Jordi de novel·la with L'últim replà, and began a long period in which he produced few novels, the exceptions being La collita del diable (1968) and Vermell i passa (1992).

In 1986 he published letters addressed to his daughter, who has Down syndrome, under the title El teu nom és Olga (Your name is Olga). The book was a success and was translated into numerous languages. In 2016 was republished in its 41st edition with a new cover by La Campana.

== La Nova Cançó ==
In 1961 Espinàs was one of the founders, with Miquel Porter i Moix and Remei Margarit, of Els Setze Jutges. He sang and recorded Catalan versions of Georges Brassens songs, traditional Catalan songs, and original compositions to further the Nova Cançó movement, but when professional Catalan-language singers appeared he retired from singing. He also wrote and recorded a story for children, Viatge a la Lluna (Voyage to the Moon), with music by Xavier Montsalvatge.

In 2007 he was awarded the Medalla d'Honor of the Parliament of Catalonia in recognition of his work with Els Setze Jutges.

== Journalism ==
On 23 April 1976, he began to publish a daily column in the new Catalan-language daily Avui, entitled A la vora de...., which ran uninterrupted until January 1999, winning various awards. Later he moved to write for El Periódico de Catalunya, with the opinion column, which he still writes.

Espinàs also hosted television interview programs, including Personal i intrasferible on Canal 33; Identitats on TV3, from 1984 to 1988; and Senyals on Canal 33, from 1989 to 1990.

== Bibliography and Discography ==
=== Short stories ===
- Vestir-se per morir. Barcelona: Albertí, 1958.
- Variétés. Barcelona: Selecta, 1959.
- Els joves i els altres. Barcelona: Albertí, 1960.
- Els germans petits de tothom. Barcelona: La Galera, 1968.
- Guia de ciutadans anònims (amb dibuixos de Cesc). Barcelona: La Campana, 1993.
- Un racó de paraigua. Barcelona: La Campana, 1997.

=== Novels ===
- Com ganivets o flames. Barcelona: Selecta, 1954.
- Dotze bumerangs. Barcelona: Albertí, 1954.
- El gandul. Barcelona: Selecta, 1955.
- Tots som iguals. Barcelona: Aymà, 1956.
- La trampa. Barcelona: Albertí, 1956.
- L´home de la guitarra. Barcelona: Albertí, 1957.
- Combat de nit. Barcelona: Aymà, 1959.
- L´últim replà. Barcelona: Club Editor, 1962.
- La collita del diable. Barcelona: Alfaguara, 1968.
- Vermell i passa. Barcelona: La Campana, 1992.

=== Non-fiction prose ===
- Petit observatori. Barcelona: Pòrtic, 1971.
- La gent tal com és. Barcelona: Selecta, 1971.
- Visions de Cadaqués. Barcelona: Grup 33, 1978.
- Els nostres objectes de cada dia. Barcelona: Ed. 62, 1981.
- El teu nom és Olga. Barcelona: La Campana, 1986.
- Inventari de jubilacions. Barcelona: La Campana, 1992.
- L'ecologisme és un egoisme. Barcelona: La Campana, 1993.

=== Travel narratives ===
- Viatge al Pirineu de Lleida. Barcelona: Selecta, 1957; Barcelona: La Campana, 2000.
- Viatge al Priorat. Barcelona: Selecta, 1962; Barcelona: La Campana, 2000.
- Viatge a la Segarra. Barcelona: Dopesa, 1972; Barcelona: La Campana, 2000.
- A peu per la Terra Alta. Barcelona: La Campana, 1989.
- A peu per la Llitera. Barcelona: La Campana, 1990.
- A peu per l'Alt Maestrat. Barcelona: La Campana, 1991.
- A peu pels camins de cendra. Barcelona: La Campana, 1994.
- A peu per l'Alcalatén. Barcelona: La Campana, 1996.
- A peu pel Matarranya. Barcelona: La Campana, 1996.
- A peu pel Comtat i la Marina. Barcelona: La Campana, 1998.
- A peu per Castella. Barcelona: La Campana, 1999.
- A peu pel País Basc. Barcelona: La Campana, 2000.
- A peu per Extremadura. Barcelona: La Campana, 2001.
- A peu per Mallorca sen veure el mar. Barcelona: La Campana, 2005.
- A peu per Aragó. El Somontano. Barcelona: La Campana, 2006.
- A peu per l´Alt Camp. Barcelona: La Campana, 2007.
- A peu per Múrcia. Barcelona: La Campana, 2009.

=== Literary journalism ===
- A la vora de l'Avui (6 vol.). Barcelona: La Llar del Llibre, 1977-1987.

=== Memoirs ===
- El nen de la plaça Ballot. Barcelona: La Campana, 1988.
- Relacions Particulars. Barcelona: La Campana, 2007.
- El meu ofici. Barcelona: La Campana, 2008.

=== Biography and Interviews ===
- Josep M. de Sagarra. Barcelona: Alcides, 1962.
- Identitats (3 vol.). Barcelona: La Campana, 1985-1988.
- Lluís Llach. Història de les seves cançons explicada a Josep Maria Espinàs: La Campana, 1986.

=== Other ===
- Carrers de Barcelona. Barcelona: Selecta, 1961.
- Barcelona, blanc i negre (amb Xavier Miserachs). Barcelona: Aymà, 1964.
- Això també és Barcelona. Barcelona: Lumen, 1965.
- Els germans petits de tothom. Barcelona: La Galera, 1988.
- Viatge pels grans magatzems. Barcelona: La Campana, 1993.

=== Theatre ===
- És perillós fer-se esperar. Barcelona: Nereida, 1959.

=== Work written in Spanish ===
- Guía del Pirineo de Lérida, 1958 (Travel narrative).
- Guía de Tarragona, Barcelona: Ed. Noguer, 1964 (Travel narrative).
- Pi de la Serra, Oviedo: Ed. Júcar, 1974 (Non-fiction).

=== Discography with Els Setze Jutges ===
- Espinàs canta Brassens (Josep Maria Espinàs), 1962.
- Cançons tradicionals catalanes (Josep Maria Espinàs), 1962.
- Espinàs canta les seves cançons (Josep Maria Espinàs), 1963.
- Nadal a casa (Josep Maria Espinàs - Maria Cinta), 1963.
- Tu no estàs sol (Josep Maria Espinàs), 1963.
- Josep Maria Espinàs i orquestra (Josep Maria Espinàs), 1964.
- Els planificadors (Josep Maria Espinàs), 1965.
- Els noctàmbuls (Josep Maria Espinàs), 1966.
