= Salvador Espriu =

Catalan writer (1913–1985)

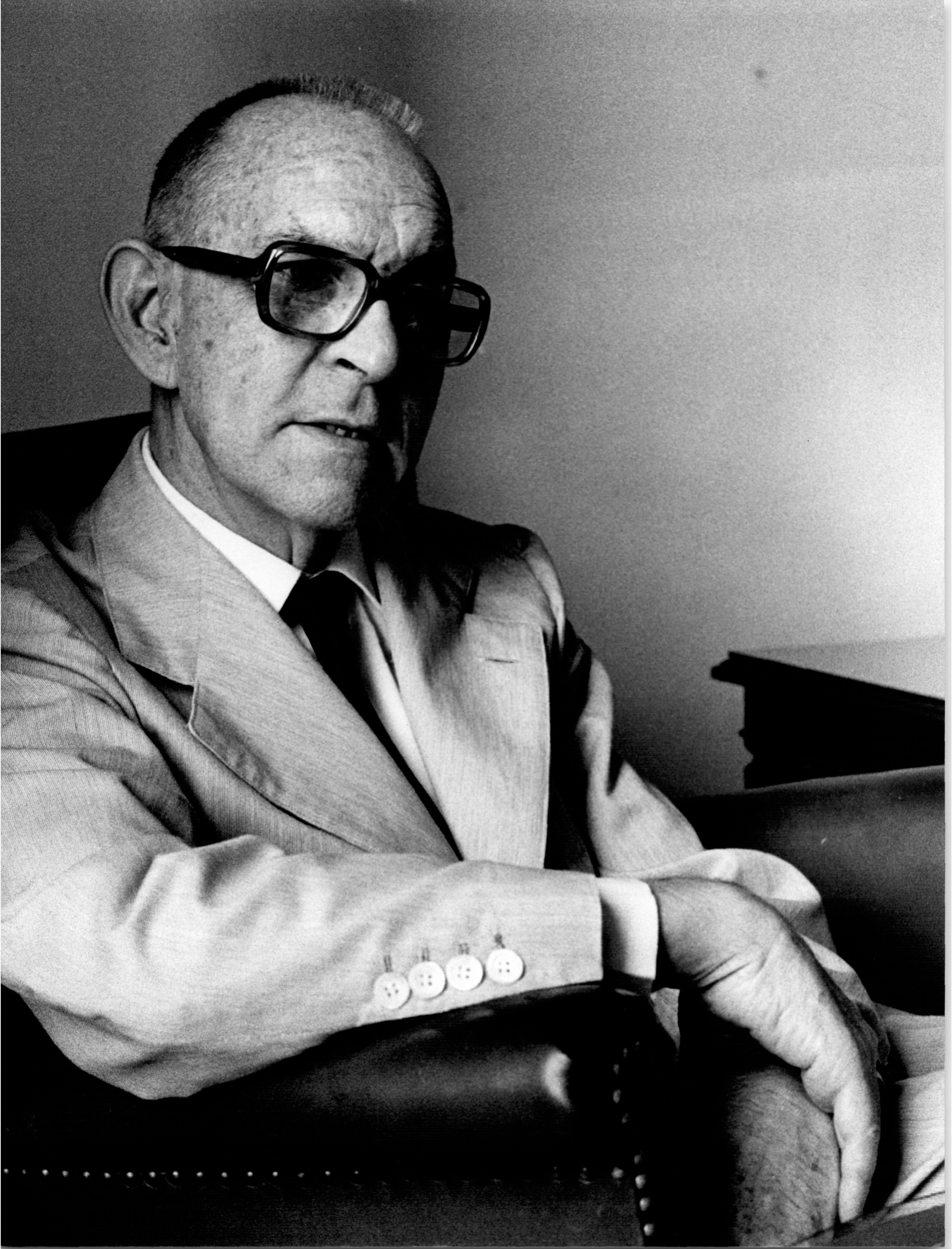
- Born: 10 July 1913; Santa Coloma de Farners, Spain
- Died: 22 February 1985 (aged 71); Barcelona, Spain
- Occupations: Playwright, poet, novelist
- Writing career
- Notable works: Ariadna al Laberint Grotesc, Cementiri de Sinera, Una altra Fedra, si us plau
- Literary movement: Noucentisme, satire

Salvador Espriu i Castelló (Catalan pronunciation: [səlβəˈðo əsˈpɾiw]; 10 July 1913 – 22 February 1985) was a Catalan poet from Spain.

== Biography ==
Espriu was born in Santa Coloma de Farners, Catalonia, Spain. He was the son of an attorney. He spent his childhood between his home town, Barcelona, and Arenys de Mar, a village on the Maresme coast. At the age of sixteen, he published his first book, Israel, written in Spanish. In 1930 he entered the University of Barcelona, where he met his lifelong friend Bartomeu Rosselló-Pòrcel. He studied law and ancient history. While traveling (1933) to Egypt, Greece and Palestine, he became acquainted with the countries that originated the great classical myths, and which would be so influential in his work.

During the Spanish Civil War he was mobilised and served in military accounting.

Translated into several languages, Espriu's work has obtained international recognition, most notably the Montaigne prize (1971). He was also given the Award of Honour of Catalan Letters (1972), the Ignasi Iglesias prize (1980), the City of Barcelona Prize (1982) and the Gold Medal of the Generalitat de Catalunya (1982). He was awarded honorary doctor's degrees by the universities of Toulouse and Barcelona.

He died in Barcelona in 1985, and was buried in the Arenys de Mar cemetery, which gives name to his poem Cementiri de Sinera.

== Work ==
=== First works ===
In 1931 he published El doctor Rip, and the following year, Laia, novels that move away from the then-fashionable theoretical formulas of the aesthetics of the Catalan Noucentisme movement.

The publication of Aspectes (1934), Ariadna al laberint grotesc (1935) and Miratge a Citera (1935), established him as the most original narrator of his generation. In these books, Espriu's prose alternately shifts from grotesque distortion to an aestheticising lyricism, probably under the influence of Spanish-language modernists Valle-Inclán and Gabriel Miró). He elaborated a synthetic realism under the linguistic tutelage of certain Catalan writers, such as Víctor Català and Joaquim Ruyra.

=== The civil war ===
In 1937, during the Civil War, he published Letizia i altres proses. In 1939, in occupied Barcelona and before the military conflict ended, he wrote a play, Antígona (published in 1955 and opened in 1958), on the subject of fratricidal war and compassion for the losers.

=== Poetry ===
Espriu, who had begun to write poetry before the war, did not publish his first volume of poems until 1946: Cementiri de Sinera, an elegy with a great formal sobriety. With this book and with the play Primera història d'Esther (published in 1948 and opened in 1957) —linguistically creative and original— began his post-war popularity, which grew as the rest of his work, essentially poetical, was published.

In Les cançons d'Ariadna (1949) he collected a series of poems from various periods that contrasted satire and distortion with elegy and lyricism and in which the mythological subjects can be found that were to appear in subsequent works.

The four books of poems that followed —Les hores and Mrs. Death (1952), El caminant i el mur (1954) and Final del laberint (1955)—compose, together with Cementiri de Sinera, a specific formal unity, on the one hand, given the symmetrical number of poems included in each volume and, on the other, the strict development of a very complex spiritual process that culminates in a mystical experience in the last book of the cycle. The musicality of Espriu's poetry has been stressed by Andreas Dorschel.

=== Popular success ===
The tremendous public success of La pell de brau (1960) signified the popular recognition of Espriu: the author posed the historical drama of Sepharad (poet's nickname for Spain after the Jewish usage) in poems with a high spiritual, moral and political resonance.

Llibre de Sinera (1963), one of his most hermetic books, ties in with subjects from the two previous works and again circumscribes the civil ambit of his poetry to the "homeland" mythicized in Sinera, a word phonetically formed by spelling backwards Arenys. In Setmana Santa (1971), through the images of the ritual procession, the author presents the myth of the Catholic Passion from a metaphysical perspective.

The bibliography of Espriu contains two more poems, included in the first volume of his Complete works (1968) (Per al llibre de salms d'aquests vells cecs and Fragments. Versots. Intencions. Matisos), and a selection of critical works, Evocació de Rosselló-Pòrcel i altres notes (1957).

Beginning in 1968, with the publication of his Complete works I. Poetry, he dedicated himself to a minute revision of his entire work. In narrative, the novels El doctor Rip (1931) and Laia (1932) were practically re-written when they were again published (1979 and 1968, respectively). The same occurred with his collection of narrations Aspectes (1934) and Ariadna al laberint grotesc (1935), published again in 1981 and 1975, respectively.

The last examples of his production were, with respect to theatre, Una altra Fedra si us plau ... (1978), the prose volume Les roques i el mar, el blau (1981) and, in poetry, the poem D'una vella i encerclada terra (1979) and the collection Per a la bona gent (1984).

Several theatral stagings of this work were made by Ricard Salvat, who also composed, based on texts by Espriu from various origins, Ronda de mort a Sinera (1966), a work with a broad theatrical audience.

The Valencian songwriter and singer Raimon has set to music Espriu's poems including Les cançons de la roda del temps (Songs on the Passing of Time), Inici de càntic en el temple (Beginning of the Canticle in the Temple) and Indesinenter.

=== A meditation on death ===
The author generically described his work as a "meditation on death", but this term is too restrictive to comprehend its complexity and cultural point of view. Actually, Espriu proposes to assume the literary tradition of humanity in a personal re-creation situated in a specific geographical and historical context, Catalonia after the defeat of the Spanish Republic in the Spanish civil war, of which he sings its failings and hope.

=== International acclaim ===
During his acceptance of the International Catalonia prize, renowned literary critic Harold Bloom called Espriu 'an extraordinary poet by any international standard', and later said 'The Nobel committee is guilty of many errors, and one of those was not to have given the prize to Salvador Espriu. I believe he deserved it'.

== See also ==
- Catalan literature
