= Nova Cançó =

Catalan artistic anti-francoist movement

The Nova Cançó (Catalan pronunciation: [ˈnɔβə kənˈso], meaning in English "The New Song") was an artistic movement that promoted Catalan music in Francoist Spain. The movement sought to normalize use of the Catalan language in popular music and denounced the injustices in Francoist Spain. The Grup de Folk, which emerged in the same period, also promoted a new form of popular music in Catalan, drawing inspiration from contemporary American and British music.

== Historical context ==
The Nova Cançó movement originated at the end of the 1950s, twenty years after the installation of the Spanish State with its repressive policies against the Catalan language and Catalan culture. The late 1950s were a period of economic and political change in Spain: Spain ended its policy of economic autarky, and Francoist Spain was admitted to the United Nations, which required the government to improve its image abroad. In this new context, at the beginning of the 1960s, new cultural projects emerged in Catalonia. In 1961, the record label Edigsa and the cultural organization Òmnium Cultural were founded, and the first edition of the children's magazine Cavall Fort was published. In April 1962, the publishing house Edicions 62 released its first book. Little by little, the Catalan language, the public use of which had been expressly forbidden after the fall of Catalonia in the Spanish Civil War, began to regain a public presence. A notable example is the magazine Germinàbit, published by the Abbey of Montserrat, which in October 1952 became the magazine Serra d’Or.

In 1957, the writer Josep Maria Espinàs gave lectures on the French singer-songwriter Georges Brassens, whom he called "the troubadour of our times." Espinàs had begun to translate some of Brassens' songs into Catalan. In 1958, two EPs of songs in Catalan were released: Hermanas Serrano: Cantan en catalán los éxitos internacionales ("The Serrano Sisters Sing International Hits in Catalan") and José Guardiola: canta en catalán los éxitos internacionales. They are now considered the first recordings of modern music in the Catalan language. These singers, as well as others such as Font Sellabona and Rudy Ventura, form a prelude to the Nova Cançó.

== La Nova Cançó ==
The movement's beginnings were in the second half of the 1950s, with the formation of a group suggested by Josep Benet i de Joan and Maurici Serrahima. This consisted of Jaume Armengol, Lluís Serrahima and Miquel Porter, who started composing Catalan songs. In 1959, after an article by Lluís Serrahima, titled "Ens calen cançons d’ara" ("We need songs for today"), was published in Germinabit, more authors and singers were attracted to the movement. Miquel Porter, Josep Maria Espinàs and Remei Margarit founded the group Els Setze Jutges (The Sixteen Judges, in Catalan). Their first concert, although still not with this name, was on 19 December 1961, in Barcelona. Their first performance with the name of Els Setze Jutges was in Premià de Mar in 1962. In the following years, new singers joined the group, until the number of sixteen (Setze). The group offered numerous performances all over Catalonia with a willingness of filling a lack in popular music in Catalan, often in precarious conditions, in which they followed the same system: everyone of the four or five members in the stage sung in turns, with his guitar, while the others were seated in the background on the stage.

The first Nova Cançó records appeared in 1962, and many musical bands, vocal groups, singer-songwriters, and interpreters picked up the trend.

In 1963, a professional Catalan artist, Salomé, and a Valencian, Raimon, were awarded the first prize of the Fifth Mediterranean Song Festival with the song "Se’n va anar" ("[She] left").

Despite the restrictions and administrative hurdles in television and radio broadcast, as well as in record industry, the Nova Cançó became increasingly popular, so many interpreters started to professionalize: first members of Els Setze Jutges sang as an amateur activity, and they leave when younger members started a career as a singers, such as Joan Manuel Serrat, Lluís Llach, Maria del Mar Bonet, Guillermina Motta or Francesc Pi de la Serra. At the same time, other variations on the style, based on other genres such as folk, appeared, with bands such as Grup de Folk and Esquirols.

Other important participants in the movement included Guillem d'Efak and Núria Feliu, who received the Spanish Critics' Award in 1966, or other new members of Els Setze Jutges. Some of them were even well known abroad.

As time passed, some bilingual singers appeared and other ideological positions emerged, diverging from the initial ideas behind the movement.

Apart from Raimon, other former members of Els Setze Jutges continued their careers successfully, including Lluís Llach, Maria del Mar Bonet, Guillermina Motta, Francesc Pi de la Serra, and Joan Manuel Serrat. Other significant figures appeared somewhat later, like the Valencian Ovidi Montllor.

Inspired by the success of the Nova Cançó, parallel movements sprang up in Galicia, Basque Country (Euskal Kantagintza Berria), and Castile.
