= Maria del Mar Bonet =

Spanish singer

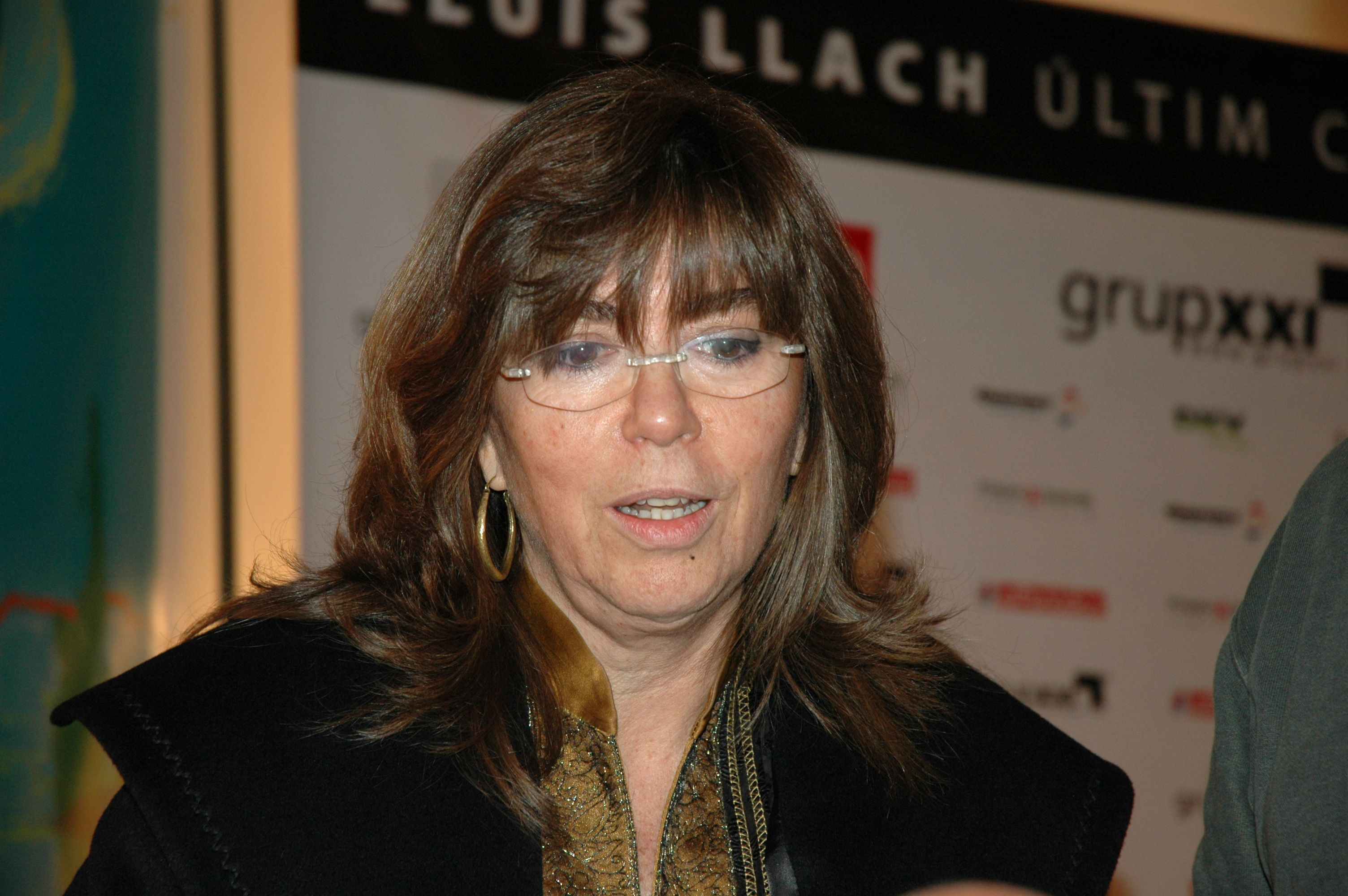
Bonet in 2007

Maria del Mar Bonet i Verdaguer (Balearic Catalan: [məˈɾi.ə ðəl ˈma boˈnət]; born 1947) is a Spanish singer.

== Early life and career ==
Bonet was born in 1947 in Palma de Mallorca, Mallorca, Spain. She studied ceramics in the school of arts, but eventually decided to dedicate herself to music. She arrived in Barcelona in 1967, where she began to sing with the group Els Setze Jutges. She has published many folk music albums in Catalan, in spite of the ban on the Catalan language and its music during Francisco Franco's dictatorship. She has performed throughout China as well as in Japan, the former USSR, Tunisia, Netherlands, Poland, Belgium, France, United Kingdom, Brazil, Sweden, Switzerland, Venezuela, Mexico, and the United States.

== Recording career ==
In 1981, Bonet recorded Jardí Tancat in Paris, along with accompaniment by Jacques Denjean and noted Breton harpist Alan Stivell. She has worked with the Ensemble of Music Traditionelle di Tunis and Brazilian musician Milton Nascimento. She earned the French Charles Cross Academy Prize and the Catalan Creu de Sant Jordi and the National Prize awarded by the Catalan government. In 1984, the French Government gave her the Charles Cross Academy Award for the best foreign record released in France. That same year Bonet was awarded the Cross of Saint George, the highest distinction of the Generalitat de Catalunya (the Catalan Government). In 1985, as a result of her interest and research into North African music, she recorded Anells d’aigua (Rings of Water) with the Ensemble de Musique Traditionelle of Tunisia, and then toured with the group throughout France and Spain. In 1998 she toured abroad and collaborated with other well-known Spanish artists such as Amancio Prada, Loquillo, Jordi Sabatés and Rosa Vergés. In 2001, Bonet recorded a Jackson Browne tribute album, Sing My Songs. The album was recorded live in July 2001 in the Gothic district of Barcelona. The album won the 2002 Spanish World Music Awards.

== Discography ==
- Maria del Mar Bonet (Maria del Mar Bonet) 1970
- Maria del Mar Bonet (Maria del Mar Bonet) 1971
- Maria del Mar Bonet (Maria del Mar Bonet) 1974
- A l'Olympia (Maria del Mar Bonet) 1975
- Cançons de festa (Maria del Mar Bonet) 1976
- Alenar (Maria del Mar Bonet) 1977
- Saba de terrer (Maria del Mar Bonet) 1979
- Quico-Maria del Mar (Maria del Mar Bonet + Francesc Pi de la Serra) 1979
- Sempre (Maria del Mar Bonet) 1981
- L'àguila negra (Maria del Mar Bonet) 1981
- Jardí tancat (Maria del Mar Bonet) 1981
- Breviari d'amor (Maria del Mar Bonet) 1982
- Cançons de la nostra mediterrània (Maria del Mar Bonet + Al Tall) 1982
- Anells d'aigua (Maria del Mar Bonet) 1985
- Gavines i dragons (Maria del Mar Bonet) 1987
- Ben a prop (Maria del Mar Bonet + Manel Camp) 1989
- Bon viatge faci la cadernera (Maria del Mar Bonet) 1990
- Coreografies (Maria del Mar Bonet) 1990
- El·las (Maria del Mar Bonet) 1993
- Salmaia (Maria del Mar Bonet) 1995
- Primeres cançons (Maria del Mar Bonet) 1997
- El cor del temps (Maria del Mar Bonet) 1997
- Cavall de foc (Maria del Mar Bonet) 1999
- Raixa (Maria del Mar Bonet) 2001
- Cants d'Abelone (Maria del Mar Bonet + Rafael Subirachs) 2001
- Collita pròpia (Maria del Mar Bonet) 2003
- Amic, amat (Maria del Mar Bonet) 2004
- Terra Secreta (Maria del Mar Bonet) 2007
- Bellver (Maria del Mar Bonet) 2010
- Blaus de l'ànima, més de 20 anys ben a prop (Maria del Mar Bonet + Manel Camp) 2011

== Awards and accomplishments ==
- 1984: Creu de Sant Jordi de la Generalitat de Catalunya.
- 1984: Premi de l'acadèmia al millor disc estranger editat a França.
- 1990: Premi Gabriel Alomar i Villalonga dels Premis 31 de Desembre de l'Obra Cultural Balear.
- 1992: Premi Nacional de Música de la Generalitat de Catalunya.
- 2000: Ramon Llull Award from the government of the Balearic Islands
- 2000: Premi a la Millor Cançó en Català de la IV Edición de los Premios de la Música.
- 2001: Premi al Millor Àlbum de Música Tradicional-Folk per "Raixa" de la VI Edición de los Premios de la Música.
- 2002: Millor Àlbum en Català per "Raixa" de la VI Edición de los Premios de la Música.
- 2002: Premi Altaveu 2002.
- 2002: Premi Enderrock de la crítica al millor álbum Folk-Noves Músiques.
- 2003: Premi Luigi Tenco 2003, de Italia.
- 2003: Premi de Música Ciutat de Barcelona per "Amic, Amat"
- 2003: Medalla d'Or de la ciutat de Mallorca.
- 2008: Premio Maria Carta of Sardinia.
