= Lluís Llach =

Spanish Catalan singer, songwriter, and novelist (born 1948)

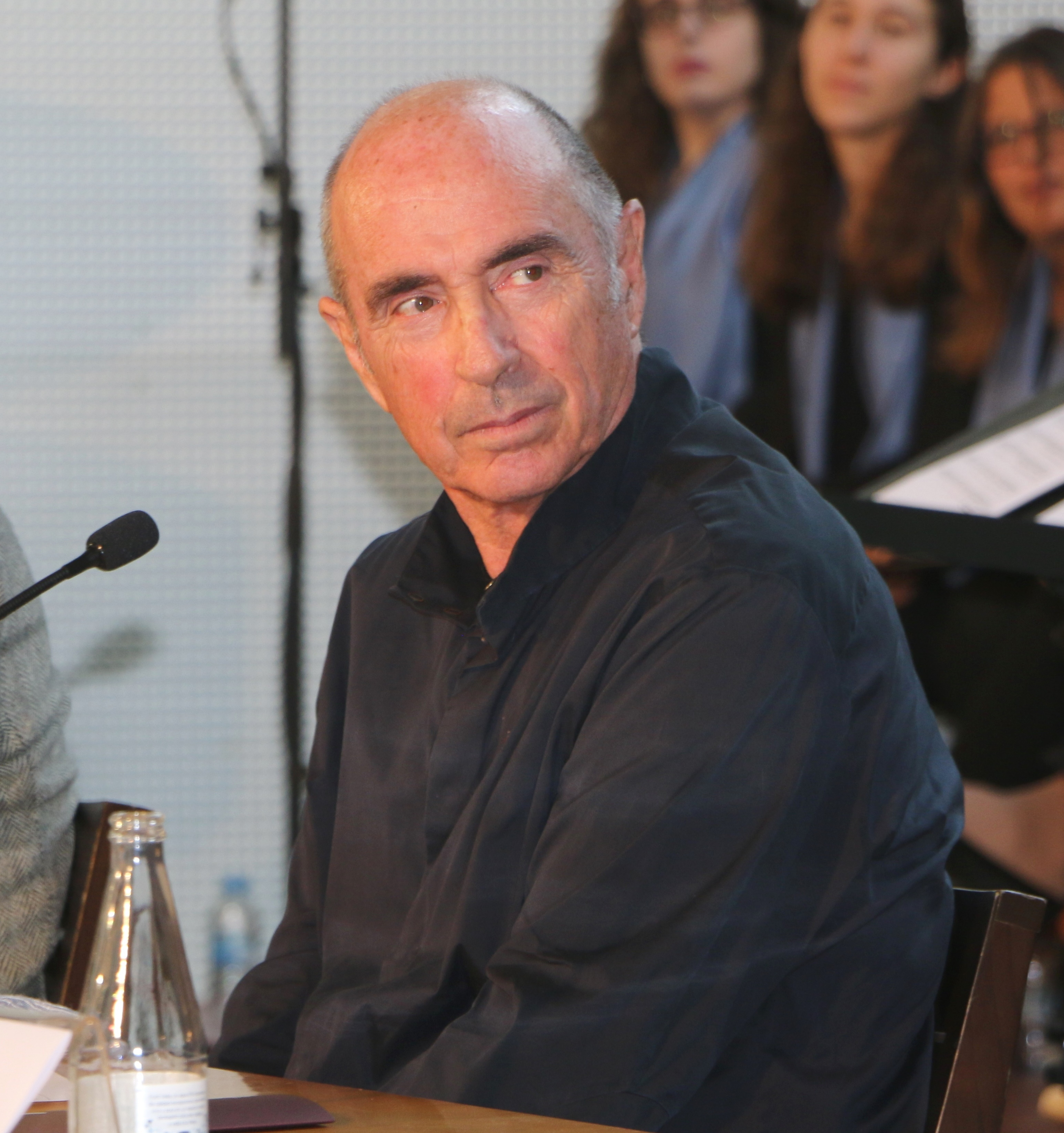
- Llach receiving his honorary doctorate at the University of Girona
- Born: 7 May 1948 (age 78); Girona, Catalonia, Spain
- Citizenship: Spanish
- Occupations: Singer; songwriter; novelist; politician
- Years active: 1965– present
- Known for: Voice; piano; guitar
- Notable work: L'Estaca
- Style: Nova Cançó
- Title: Deputy of the Parliament of Catalonia
- Term: 26 October 2015 – 28 October 2017
- Political party: Esquerra Republicana; Junts pel Sí; CUP
- Movement: Catalan independence movement
- Honours: Honorary Doctorate, University of Girona (2017); Maria Àngels Anglada Prize (2013)
- Website: lluisllach.cat

Lluís Llach i Grande (Catalan pronunciation: [ʎuˈiz ˈʎak]; born 7 May 1948) is a Catalan singer-songwriter, novelist and politician. He is one of the main representatives of the nova cançó genre and an outspoken advocate of the right to self-determination of Catalonia. His most famous song, "L'Estaca", has become the unofficial anthem of the Catalan independence movement. He was a member of the Catalan Parliament from September 2015 until January 2018.

== Music ==
He is one of the main representatives of nova cançó (New Song), a movement of musicians, and singers who defied Francisco Franco's dictatorship by singing political songs in Catalan during a time when the language and other manifestations of Catalan identity were not allowed. Nonetheless, on 23 January 1973, TVE aired the show Lluís Llach, in the Catalan language, shot in various locations in the province of Girona. His famous song "L'Estaca" about a rotten pole about to fall was clear enough as an image of the regime. As many other singers, writers and politically involved artists, Llach left Spain and lived in voluntary exile in Paris until Franco's death.

Though partially dependent on arrangers, like Manel Camp or Carles Cases in his early works, Llach's songwriting has largely evolved from the more basic early compositions to a vastly more complex harmonic and melodic writing. Self-taught as a guitarist, Llach only strums simple chords on guitar. As a pianist, he shows a good knowledge of the European song tradition from Schubert to Hahn with touches of Satie ("Nounou") and his local imitators like Mompou and Manuel Blancafort ("A la taverna del mar"). Llach has used salsa piano patterns ("Terra") and jazzy whole-step block modulations ("El jorn dels miserables") and progressions ("Cançó d'amor a la llibertat"). Some early songs depicted some inspiration from Baroque dances ("Laura", "Jo sé", "Vinyes verdes vora el mar") and ostinato chord patterns ("Non", "Somniem"). Among his influences as singer, Llach has recognized Mahalia Jackson and Jacques Brel.

His lyrics can range from traditional romantic songs, to more complex, philosophical song-cycles and also to some more ironic, politically based compositions, with a more upbeat tempo. When he doesn't write the lyrics of his songs he sings to the lyrics of a variety of poets, including Constantine P. Cavafy, Màrius Torres, Josep Maria de Segarra, Pere Quart and, perhaps more often than with any of the others, Miquel Martí i Pol.

Llach has occasionally performed as a classical baritone, including a series of performances of Gabriel Fauré's Requiem, and has also been a wine producer. He marked his retirement as front man in music with a farewell concert in Verges (March 2007), in Baix Empordà on the Costa Brava, the village in which he grew up. He has performed incidental music for theatre pieces since then.

His 1968 song "L'Estaca" has become the anthem of several political movements, including Solidarność in Poland, the Tunisian Revolution, the Indignados or Occupy movement in Spain, and the Catalan independence movement, regularly sung by crowds at demonstrations.

== Politics ==
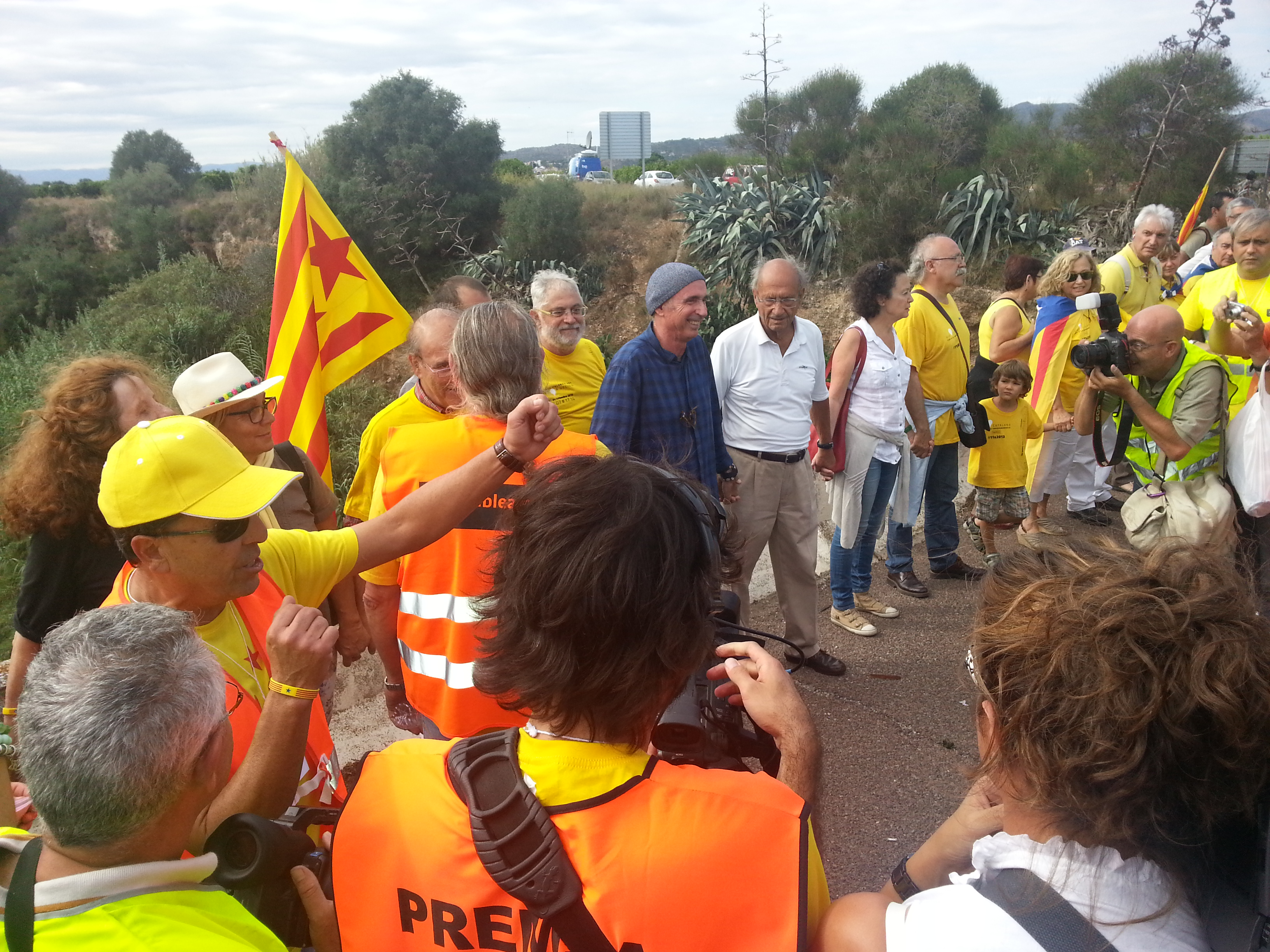
Llach (centre, with hat) taking part in the 2013 Catalan Way protest

Llach is a supporter of Catalan independence and the left-wing party ERC. He stood for election in the parliamentary elections of September 2015, as an independent candidate in the Junts pel Sí (Together for Yes) pro-independence alliance. He headed the alliance's list for Girona, one of the four constituencies, and was elected. The coalition got 11 out of 17 seats in Girona.

In 2021, Llach endorsed the left-wing, pro-independence CUP citing the issue of healthcare.

== Controversial statements ==
In July 2017, Lluis Llach stated that civil servants in Catalonia who continued to follow Spanish law after a future declaration of independence would be "penalised".

On 7 October 2017, prior to the anti-independence unionist demonstration the following day, he tweeted: "Tomorrow let's leave the streets of Barcelona empty. Let the vultures find no food"

== Personal life ==
Llach is openly gay. During the trial of Catalonia independence leaders in 2019, he protested being asked to answer questions from the lawyers of the far-right party Vox, "as a homosexual and pro-independence citizen, and aspiring citizen of the world."

== Discography ==
- Els èxits de Lluís Llach (1969)
- Ara i aquí (1970)
- Com un arbre nu (1972)
- Lluís Llach a l'Olympia (1973)
- L'Estaca (1973)
- I si canto trist... (1974)
- Viatge a Itaca (1975)
- Barcelona, gener de 1976 (1976)
- Campanades a morts (1977)
- El meu amic, el mar (1978)
- Somniem (1979)
- Verges 50 (1980)
- I amb el somriure, la revolta (1982)
- T'estimo (1984)
- Maremar (1985)
- Camp del Barça, 6 de juliol de 1985 (1985)
- Astres (1986)
- Geografia (1988)
- La forja de un rebelde (1990)
- Torna aviat (1991)
- Ara, 25 anys en directe (1992)
- Un pont de mar blava (1993)
- Rar (1994)
- Porrera (1995)
- Nu (1997)
- 9 (1998)
- Temps de revoltes (2000)
- Jocs (2002)
- Junts (2003)
- Poetes (2004)
- Que no s'apague la llum (2005)
- i... (2006)
- Verges 2007 (2007)

== Bibliography ==
- Memòria d'uns ulls pintats (2012)
- Estimat Miquel (2014)
- Les dones de la Principal (2014)
- El noi del Maravillas (2017)
- Escac al destí (2020)
- El llibre daurat (2025)

== Literature about Llach ==
Pep Blay's Lluís Llach (Col·lecció "Los Autores", SGAE, Barcelona, 1995) is a biography about the Catalan musician and songwriter Llach, which contains an interesting chronology, a collection of pictures, an anthology of songs and a discography.

== Awards and distinctions ==
- 1982: Creu de Sant Jordi
- 2013: Euskadi de Plata prize for the Spanish translation of Memòria d'uns ulls pintats.
- 2013: Maria Àngels Anglada Prize for Memòria d'uns ulls pintats.
- 2016: Prix Méditerranée for Les yeux fardés (French translation of Memòria d'uns ulls pintats).
- 2017: Honorary doctorate from the Universitat de Girona
- 2020: Gold Medal of the Generalitat of Catalonia
