= Òmnium Prize =

Catalan literary award

- Awarded for: Catalan-language novel
- Sponsored by: Òmnium Cultural
- Location: Barcelona, Spain
- Website: https://www.omnium.cat/premi-omnium

The Òmnium Prize for Best Novel of the Year is a literary prize awarded by the Òmnium Cultural association for a Catalan-language novel. It has a €20,000 award for the author and a €5,000 award for the publisher of the work. It is the best-funded prize for a published Catalan-language novel.

== History ==
The prize was created in 2017 with a €20,000 direct donation for the author and a marketing campaign valued at €5,000, with the intention of annually recognizing the best Catalan-language novel and make it known to the public. It is similar to the Prix Goncourt for French literature.

In the first edition, a selection committee composed of the editor of the Núvol online newspaper, Bernat Puigtobella, bookseller Olga Federico, and librarian Carme Fenoll nominated 16 novels published in 2017. Afterwards, a jury of five independent members (Harvard University professor Maria Dasca, University of Barcelona professor emeritus Rosa Cabré, University of Valencia professor Carme Gregori, University of Girona professor Xavier Pla, and cultural manager Oriol Izquierdo) selected three finalist works in the first round and selected the winner in the second round.

== Winner and finalists ==
Year	Authors	Work	Publisher
2024	Manuel Baixauli	Cavall, atleta, ocell	Edicions del Periscopi
2024	Alba Dedeu	La conformista	L'Altra Editorial
2024	Elisenda Solsona	Mammalia	Editorial Males Herbes
2023	Imma Monsó	La mestra i la Bèstia	Editorial Anagrama
2023	Maria Climent i Huguet	A casa teníem un himne	L'Altra Editorial
2023	Elisabet Riera Millán	Una vegada va ser estiu la nit sencera	Editorial Males Herbes
2022	Sebastià Alzamora	Ràbia	Edicions Proa
2022	Maria Barbal	Al llac	Columna Edicions
2022	Sebastià Portell i Clar	Les altures	Editorial Empúries
2021	Joan Lluís-Lluís	Junil a les terres dels bàrbars	Club Editor
2021	Núria Bendicho	Terres mortes	Editorial Anagrama
2021	Jordi Cussà	El primer emperador i la reina Lluna	Editorial Comanegra
2020	Eva Baltasar	Boulder	Club Editor
2020	Miquel Martín i Serra	La drecera	Edicions del Periscopi
2020	Sebastià Perelló	La mar rodona	Club Editor
2019	Martí Domínguez	L'esperit del temps	Edicions Proa
2019	Jordi Lara	Sis nits d'agost	Edicions de 1984
2019	Irene Solà	Canto jo i la muntanya balla	Editorial Anagrama
2018	Marta Orriols	Aprendre a parlar amb les plantes	Edicions del Periscopi
2018	Melcior Comas	Sobre la terra impura	Edicions Proa
2018	Pere Joan Martorell	La memòria de l'oracle	Edicions del 1984
2017	Raül Garrigasait	Els estranys	Edicions del 1984
2017	Maria Guasch	Els fills de Llacuna Park	L'Altra Editorial
2017	Vicenç Pagès i Jordà	Robinson	Empúries
