= Monsó =

Monsó is a Spanish surname. Notable people with the surname include:

- Imma Monsó (born 1959), Spanish novelist and schoolteacher
- José Martí y Monsó (1840–1912), Spanish artist
- Susana Monsó (born 1988), Spanish philosopher
