= Eva Baltasar =

Spanish poet and writer

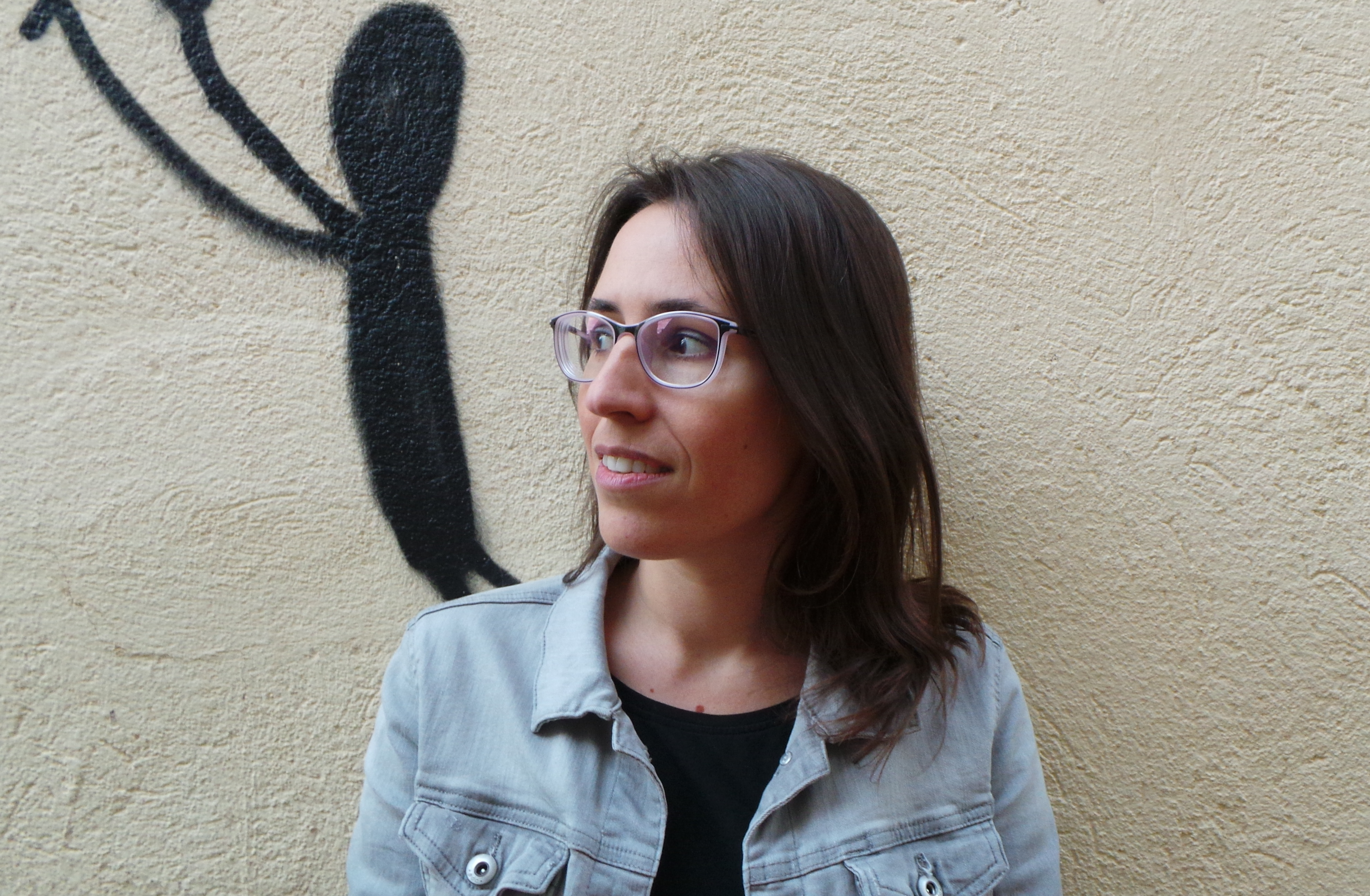
- Born: August 26, 1978 (age 48); Barcelona, Catalonia, Spain
- Education: University of Barcelona
- Occupation: Writer

Eva Baltasar (born August 26, 1978) is a Catalan poet and writer. She has a bachelor's degree in Pedagogy from the University of Barcelona. She has published ten books of poetry, which have earned numerous awards including the 2008 Miquel de Palol, the 2010 Benet Ribas, the 2015 Gabriel Ferrater, and the 2020 Òmnium Prize. Baltasar's first novel, Permafrost, received the 2018 Catalan Booksellers Award and it has sold the translation rights to six languages. Its sequel Boulder was shortlisted for the 2023 International Booker Prize. In 2026, she received the Prix Médicis étranger for Déclin et fascination.

== Literary work ==
=== Novel ===
- Permagel. Club Editor, 2018
- Boulder. Club Editor, 2020
- Mamut. Club Editor, 2022
- Ocàs i fascinació. Club Editor, 2024
- Peixos. Club Editor, 2026

Translated Work

- Permafrost. Penguin Random House, 2018 (Spanish)
- Permafrost. Nottetempo, 2019 (Italian)
- Permafrost. And Other Stories, 2021 (English)
- Permafrost. Verdier, 2020 (French)
- Boulder. Penguin Random House, 2020 (Spanish)
- Boulder. And Other Stories, 2022 (English)
- Boulder. Verdier, 2022 (French)
- Mammoth. And Other Stories, 2024 (English)
- Mammouth. Verdier, 2024 (French)
- Déclin et fascination, Verdier, 2026 (French)

=== Poetry ===
- Laia. Columna, 2008
- Atàviques feres. Cossetània Edicions, 2009
- Reclam. Institut d'Estudis Ilerdencs, 2010
- Dotze treballs. Pagès, 2011
- Medi aquàtic. Pagès, 2011
- Poemes d'una embarassada. Pagès, 2012
- Vida limitada. Món de Llibres, 2013
- Animals d'hivern. Edicions 62, 2016
- Neutre. Bromera, 2017
- Invertida. Lleonard Muntaner, 2017
- Nus Schiele. Club Editor, 2021

== Awards ==
- 2008 Miquel de Palol Prize for Laia
- 2008 Ramon Comas i Maduell Prize for Atàviques feres
- 2010 Benet Ribas Prize for Dotze treballs
- 2010 Les Talúries Prize for Reclam
- 2010 Màrius Torres Prize for Medi aquàtic
- 2011 Jordi Pàmias Prize for Poemes d'una embarassada
- 2013 Miquel Àngel Riera Prize for Vida limitada
- 2015 Gabriel Ferrater Prize for Animals d'hivern
- 2016 Mallorca Prize for Invertida
- 2016 Ibn Jafadja Prize for Neutre
- 2018 Llibreter Award for Permagel
- 2018 L'illa dels llibres Award for Permagel
- 2019 Premi Continuarà de Cultura Rtve 2019
- 2020 Òmnium Prize
