= Raül Garrigasait =

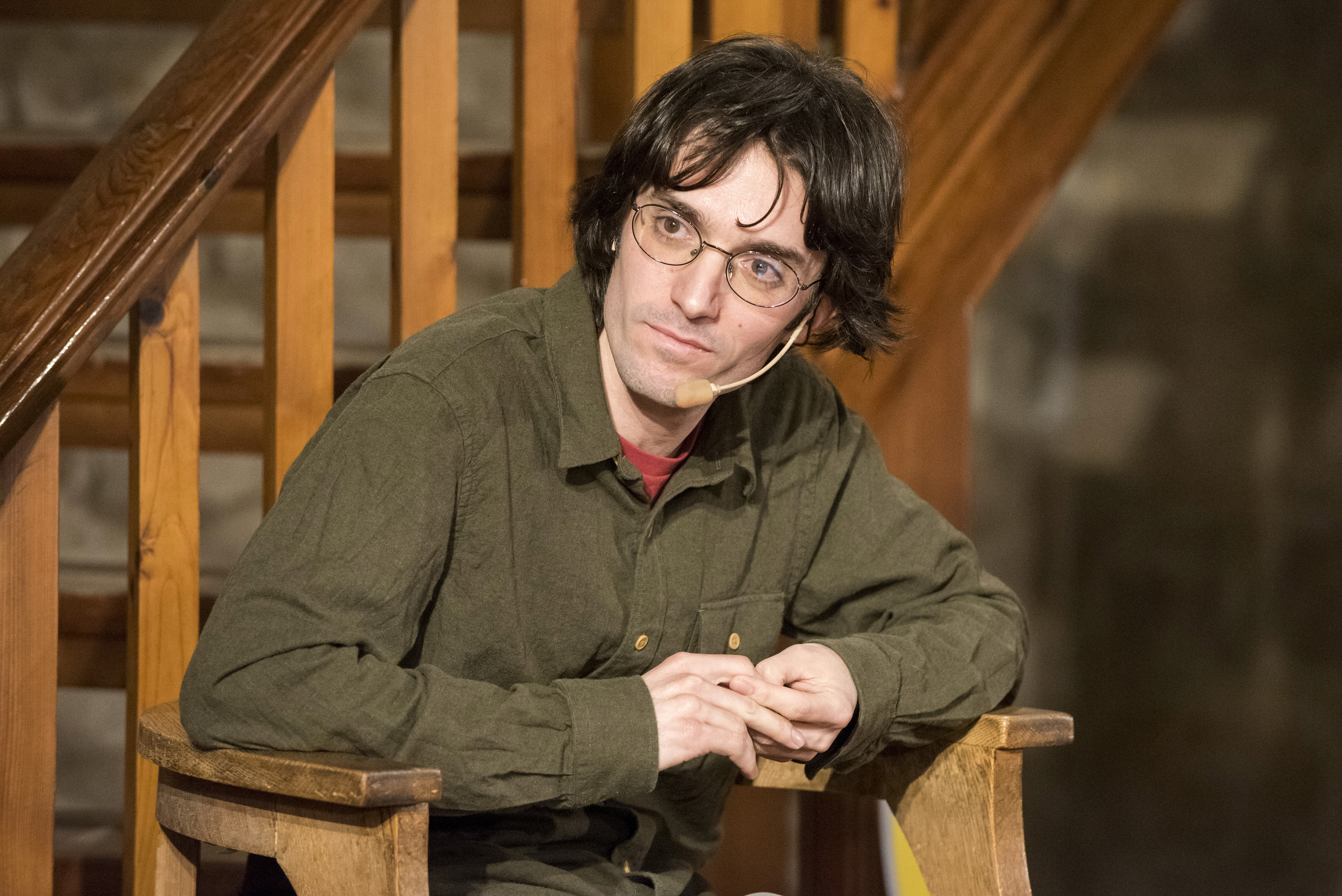
- Born: 1979 (age 46–47); Solsona, Spain
- Writing career
- Language: Catalan

Raül Garrigasait i Colomés (Solsona, 1979) is a Catalan translator from Greek and German to Catalan language. His first book was an essay on classical erudition. His first novel, Els estranys, won the 2017 Catalan booksellers' Prize and the 2017 Òmnium Prize.

He has translated works by Plato, Goethe, Alexandros Papadiamandis, Joseph Roth, and Peter Sloterdijk, among other writers, and presently heads La Casa dels Clàssics (House of the Classics), a project initiated by the Bernat Metge Collection with the aim of promoting the creation, thought and dissemination of universal classics in the Catalan language.

== Works ==
- La tendra mà de cada arrel (The tender hand of each root) (Viena edicions, 2005)
- El gos cosmopolita i dos espècimens més (The Cosmopolitan Dog and Two Other Specimens] (A Contravent, 2012)
- Els estranys (Edicions de 1984, 2017) translated to English by Tiago Miller and published by Fum d'Estampa (2021)
- 2018: El fugitiu que no se'n va (Edicions de 1984)
- 2020: La ira (Fragmenta )
- 2020: Els fundadors: una història d'ambició, clàssics i poder (Ara Llibres)
- 2020: País barroc (L'Avenç)
