= 2005 Tennis Masters Cup – Singles =

Singles
- 2005 Tennis Masters Cup

Final
- Champion: (Argentina) David Nalbandian
- Runner-up: (Switzerland) Roger Federer
- Score: 6–7^{(4–7)}, 6–7^{(11–13)}, 6–2, 6–1, 7–6^{(7–3)}

Details
- Draw: 8

Events
| Singles | Doubles |
- ATP Finals

David Nalbandian defeated the two-time defending champion Roger Federer in the final, 6–7^{(4–7)}, 6–7^{(11–13)}, 6–2, 6–1, 7–6^{(7–3)} to win the singles tennis title at the 2005 Tennis Masters Cup.

Mariano Puerta's round-robin result was disqualified upon his doping charge in December 2005.

== Seeds ==
1. (Switzerland) Roger Federer (final)
2. (Spain) Rafael Nadal (withdrew due to a left foot injury)
3. (United States) Andre Agassi (round robin, withdrew due to a left ankle sprain)
4. (Argentina) Guillermo Coria (round robin)
5. (Russia) Nikolay Davydenko (semifinals)
6. (Croatia) Ivan Ljubičić (round robin)
7. (Argentina) Gastón Gaudio (semifinals)
8. (Argentina) David Nalbandian (champion)

== Alternates ==
1. (Argentina) ~~Mariano Puerta~~ (replaced Nadal, round robin)
2. (Chile) Fernando González (replaced Agassi, round robin)
3. (Sweden) Thomas Johansson (Did not play)

== Draw ==
Key

- Q = Qualifier
- WC = Wild card
- LL = Lucky loser
- Alt = Alternate
- ITF = ITF entry
- PR = Protected ranking
- SR = Special ranking
- SE = Special exempt
- JE = Junior exempt
- JR = Junior Accelerator Programme entrant
- CO = College Accelerator Programme entrant
- NG = Next Gen Accelerator Program entrant
- w/o = Walkover
- r = Retired
- d = Defaulted

=== Finals ===
Semifinals
1 | (Switzerland) Roger Federer | 6 | 6
7 | (Argentina) Gastón Gaudio | 0 | 0
5 | (Russia) Nikolay Davydenko | 0 | 5
8 | (Argentina) David Nalbandian | 6 | 7

Final
1 | (Switzerland) Roger Federer | 7^{7} | 7^{13} | 2 | 1 | 6^{3}
8 | (Argentina) David Nalbandian | 6^{4} | 6^{11} | 6 | 6 | 7^{7}

=== Red group ===
| | | (Switzerland) Federer | (Argentina) Coria | (Croatia) Ljubičić | (Argentina) Nalbandian | RR W–L | Set W–L | Game W–L | Standings |
| 1 | (Switzerland) Roger Federer | | 6–0, 1–6, 6–2 | 6–3, 2–6, 7–6^{(7–4)} | 6–3, 2–6, 6–4 | 3–0 | 6–3 | 42–36 | 1 |
| 4 | (Argentina) Guillermo Coria | 0–6, 6–1, 2–6 | | 2–6, 3–6 | 5–7, 4–6 | 0–3 | 1–6 | 22–38 | 4 |
| 6 | (Croatia) Ivan Ljubičić | 3–6, 6–2, 6–7^{(4–7)} | 6–2, 6–3 | | 2–6, 2–6 | 1–2 | 3–4 | 31–32 | 3 |
| 8 | (Argentina) David Nalbandian | 3–6, 6–2, 4–6 | 7–5, 6–4 | 6–2, 6–2 | | 2–1 | 5–2 | 38–27 | 2 |

Standings are determined by: 1. number of wins; 2. number of matches; 3. in two-players-ties, head-to-head records; 4. in three-players-ties, percentage of sets won, or of games won; 5. steering-committee decision.

=== Gold group ===
| | | (United States) Agassi (Chile) González | (Russia) Davydenko | (Argentina) Gaudio | (Argentina) Puerta | RR W–L | Set W–L | Game W–L | Standings |
| 3; 10 | (United States) Andre Agassi (Chile) Fernando González | | 4–6, 2–6 (w/ Agassi) | 6–1, 5–7, 5–7 (w/ González) | 6–3, 4–6, 6–0 (w/ González) | 0–1; 1–1 | 0–2; 3–3 | 6–12; 32–24 | 5; 3 |
| 5 | (Russia) Nikolay Davydenko | 6–4, 6–2 (w/ Agassi) | | 6–3, 6–4 | 6–3, 6–2 | 3–0 | 6–0 | 36–18 | 1 |
| 7 | (Argentina) Gastón Gaudio | 1–6, 7–5, 7–5 (w/ González) | 3–6, 4–6 | | 6–3, 7–5 | 2–1 | 4–3 | 35–36 | 2 |
| 9 | (Argentina) ~~Mariano Puerta~~ | 3–6, 6–4, 0–6 (w/ González) | 3–6, 2–6 | 3–6, 5–7 | | 0–3 | 1–6 | 22–41 | 4 |

Standings are determined by: 1. number of wins; 2. number of matches; 3. in two-players-ties, head-to-head records; 4. in three-players-ties, percentage of sets won, or of games won; 5. steering-committee decision.

== See also ==
- ATP World Tour Finals appearances
