= Boulder (novel) =

2020 Catalan novel

- Author: Eva Baltasar
- Language: Catalan
- Publisher: Club Editor
- Publication date: March 1, 2020
- Publication place: Spain
- Pages: 160
- ISBN: 978-84-7329-257-3

Boulder is a 2020 novel by Catalan author Eva Baltasar. In 2023, the English translation by Julia Sanches was shortlisted for the International Booker Prize.

== Plot ==
Boulder is the nickname given to a woman by another woman called Samsa while the former works as a cook on a merchant ship. The novel follows the eponymous main character as the couple moves to Reykjavík, Samsa has a child, and Boulder navigates how the resulting changes in their relationship clash with her desire for freedom.

== Reception ==
=== Critical reception ===
The novel was well received by critics. Greg Mania, in a review for The New York Times Book Review praised its depiction of intimacy, commenting "the language of desire never stops vibrating off the page". He mentions that in the way motherhood changes the "delightfully complex protagonist lies the source of this novel’s magnetism." Patrick Graney, in a review for The Times, compared it to Baltasar's previous novel Permafrost, saying that Boulder's "depiction of parenthood and its particular challenges in same-sex relationships" was similar to Permafrost's "[exploration] of the tensions between a lesbian narrator and her seemingly heteronormative family." He also praised Sanches's "voraciously readable translation". J. Ernesto Ayala-Dip complimented the lyrical quality of the writing and called Baltasar one of the most important names in contemporary Catalan literature.

The judges for the International Booker Prize described it as "[an] incisive story of queer love and motherhood that slices open the dilemmas of exchanging independence for intimacy."

=== Awards and accolades ===
The novel won the 2020 Òmnium Prize. In 2023, the English translation by Julia Sanches was shortlisted for the International Booker Prize.
