= CTFC =

CTFC can refer to one of the following association football clubs:

- Camberley Town F.C.
- Carlton Town F.C.
- Carterton Town F.C., founded as, and now known once again as Carterton F.C.
- Chard Town F.C.
- Chatham Town F.C.
- Chatteris Town F.C.
- Cheltenham Town F.C.
- Chertsey Town F.C.
- Chippenham Town F.C.
- Chongqing Tonglianglong F.C.
- Cinderford Town F.C.
- Cirencester Town F.C.
- Clacton Town F.C.
- Clevedon Town F.C.
- Coalville Town F.C.
- Corby Town F.C.
- Cradley Town F.C.
- Crawley Town F.C.

It can also refer to a natural resources research centre in Catalonia: Forest Sciences Centre of Catalonia
