= Sebastià Alzamora i Martín =

Spanish writer, literary critic and cultural manager

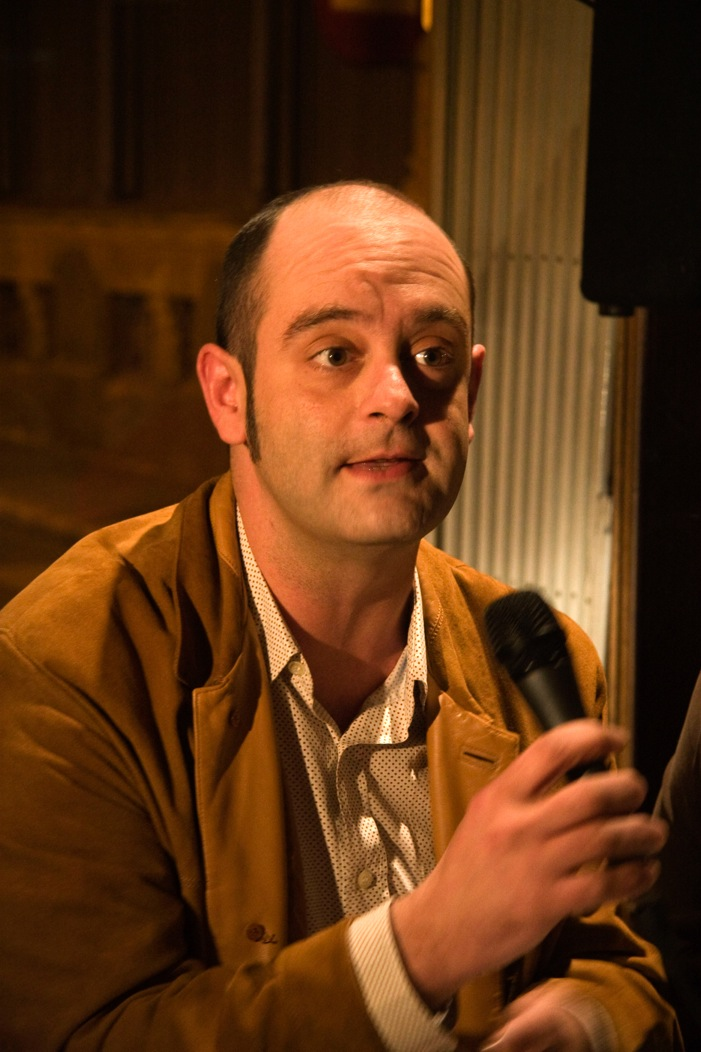
- Born: March 6, 1972 (age 54); Llucmajor, Majorca, Balearic Islands
- Writing career
- Language: Catalan
- Genre: Literature
- Notable works: La pell i la princesa (2005), Nit de l'ànima (2007), Blood Crime (2012)
- Notable awards: Òmnium Prize 2022, Premi Sant Jordi de novel·la 2011, Carles Riba Poetry Prize 2008, Premi Josep Pla de narrativa 2005

Sebastià Alzamora i Martín (born March 6, 1972, in Llucmajor, Majorca) is a writer, literary critic and cultural manager from Majorca. He is a self-proclaimed member of the poetic group called Imparables ("Unstoppables").

== Biography ==
Sebastià has a degree in Catalan philology from Universitat de les Illes Balears, and became known with collection of poems Rafel (1994; Premi Salvador Espriu). He has also published Apoteosi del cercle (1997), Mula morta (2001) and El benestar (2003).

As a writer, he has published L'extinció (1999), Sara i Jeremies (2002), La pell i la princesa (2005), Nit de l'ànima (2007), Miracle a Llucmajor (2010) and Dos amics de vint anys (2013). He is the author of the essay about Gabriel Janer Manila L'escriptura del Foc (1998). He also participated in Imparables, Una antologia (2004) and he has published with Hèctor Bofill and Manuel Forcano Dogmàtica Imparable (2005). His novel Crim de sang has been published in English as Blood Crime (Soho Press, 2016).

As a columnist, he writes in Catalan language newspapers Avui and Ara. Since December 2007, he is the director of the magazine Cultura.

== Awards ==
- 1994: Award Salvador Espriu by Rafel
- 1996: Award Bartomeu Rosselló-Pòrcel of Premis 31 de Desembre from Obra Cultural Balear.
- 1999: Award Documenta de narrativa
- 2002: Award Ciutat de Palma de novel·la for Sara i Jeremies
- 2003: Award Jocs Florals de Barcelona for El Benestar
- 2005: Award Josep Pla de narrativa for La pell i la princesa
- 2008: Carles Riba Poetry Prize for La part visible
- 2011: Award Sant Jordi de novel·la for Crim de sang
- 2022: Òmnium Prize for Ràbia
