= Maria Àngels Anglada Prize =

Maria Àngels Anglada's Narrative Prize
- Named for Maria Àngels Anglada
- Awarded for: Catalan language novel, short story
- Sponsored by: Figueres City Council; Girona Provincial Council; Alt Empordà County Council
- Venue: Ramon Muntaner Secondary School, Figueres
- Country: Spain
- First award: 2004

The Maria Àngels Anglada Prize (in Catalan: Premi de Narrativa Maria Àngels Anglada; Catalan pronunciation: [ˈpɾɛ.mi ˈðə nə.rə'ti.βa məˈɾi.ə 'aɲ.ʒəlz əɲ'ɡla.ðə]) is a Catalan literary award, given annually by the Institut Ramon Muntaner ("Ramon Muntaner Secondary School"), in Figueres (Spain), with the aim of contributing to the promotion of Catalan literature, reaffirming the civic and cultural projection of the school and extolling the memory of the writer Maria Àngels Anglada (Vic, 1930 - Figueres, 1999), ex-professor of the centre. The award has the support of the Geli-Anglada family and the sponsorship of the Ajuntament de Figueres ("Figueres City Council") and the Diputació de Girona ("Girona Provincial Council"), as well as the collaboration of the Consell Comarcal de l'Alt Empordà ("Alt Empordà County Council").

== Winners ==
- 2004: Emili Teixidor: Pa negre
- 2005: Carme Riera: La meitat de l'ànima
- 2006: Joan-Daniel Bezsonoff: Les amnèsies de Déu
- 2007: Imma Monsó: Un home de paraula
- 2008: Quim Monzó: Mil cretins
- 2009: Joan Francesc Mira: El professor d'història
- 2010: Màrius Carol: L'home dels pijames de seda
- 2011: Sergi Pàmies: La bicicleta estàtica
- 2012: Jaume Cabré: Jo confesso
- 2013: Lluís Llach: Memòria d'uns ulls pintats
- 2014: Rafel Nadal: Quan en dèiem xampany
- 2015: Vicenç Pagès: Dies de frontera
- 2016: Teresa Colom: La senyoreta Keaton i altres bèsties
- 2017: Pep Puig: La vida sense la Sara Amat
- 2018: Tina Vallès: La memòria de l'arbre
- 2019: Joan-Lluís Lluís: Jo soc aquell que va matar Franco
- 2020: Irene Solà: Canto jo i la muntanya balla
- 2021: Miquel Martín Serra: La drecera
- 2022: Alba Dalmau: Amor i no
- 2023: Ferran Garcia: Guilleries
