= Solsona, Spain =

Solsona
- Municipality
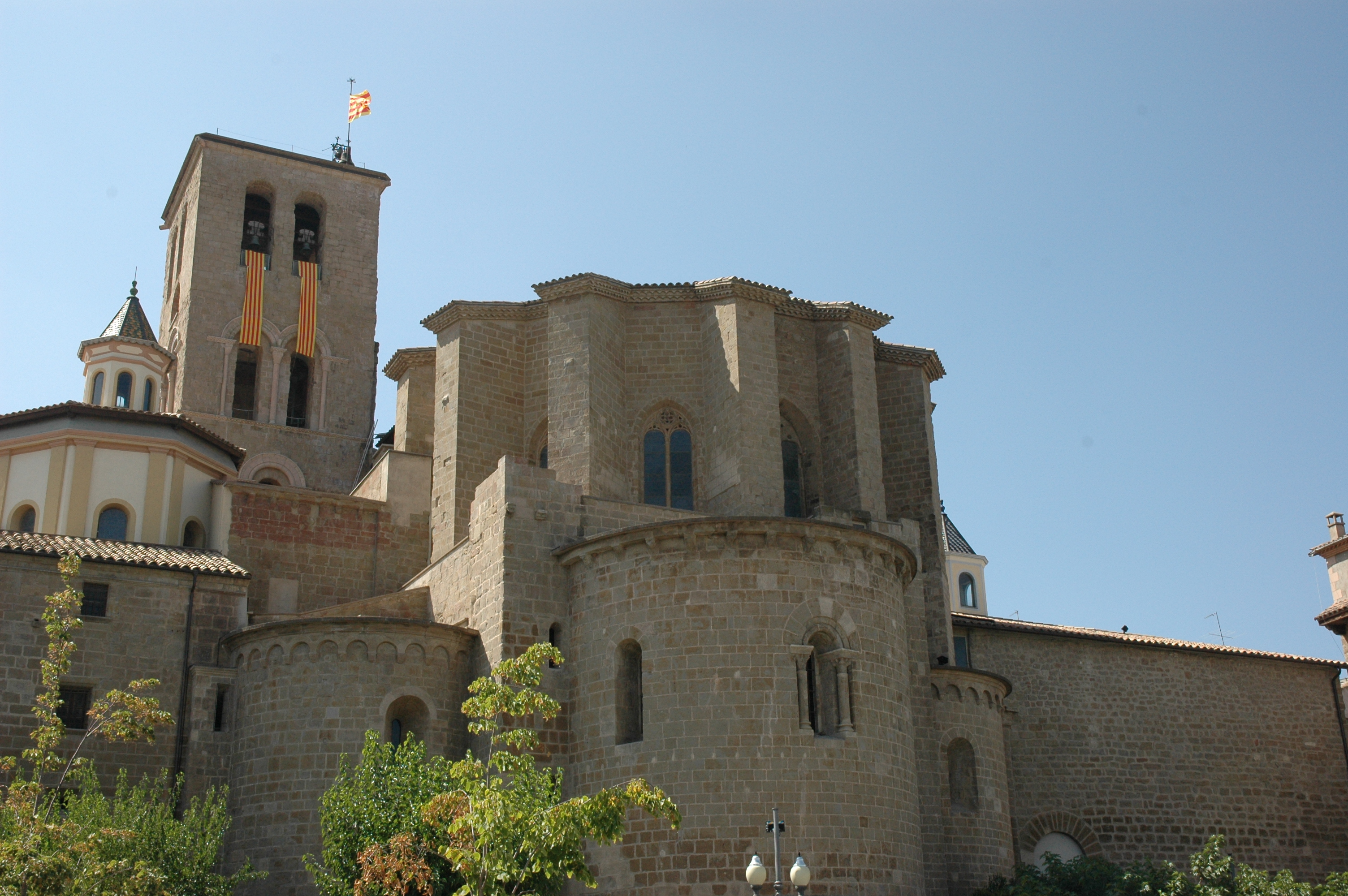
- Cathedral of Solsona

- Coat of arms

- Location in Catalonia
- Coordinates: 41°59′52″N 1°31′15″E
- Country: Spain
- Community: Catalonia
- Province: Lleida
- Comarca: Solsonès

Government
  - Mayor: David Rodríguez González (2015)

Area
  - Total: 17.7 km^{2} (6.8 sq mi)
- Elevation: 670 m (2,200 ft)

Population (2025-01-01)
  - Total: 9,717
  - Density: 549/km^{2} (1,420/sq mi)
- Postal code: 25280
- Climate: Cfb
- Website: ajsolsona.cat

Solsona (Catalan pronunciation: [sulˈsona]) is a municipality and capital of the comarca of the Solsonès in the province of Lleida, Catalonia, Spain. It has a population of 9,717 (register office, 2025).

It is situated in the centre of the comarca in the Catalan Central Depression. It is served by the C-55 road to Manresa, and is linked to Berga and Bassella by the C-26. Until a few years ago, Solsona used to be the main road used by people from Barcelona to go to Andorra.

== Etymology ==
The name most probably derives from the Setelsis (Ancient Greek: Σετελσίς or Σελενσίς) mentioned by Ptolemy as a town of the tribe of Iacetani in Hispania Tarraconensis.

== Main sights ==
The old town is known as the Nucli antic: it preserves a large part of its fortifications. The cathedral of Santa Maria de Solsona and the episcopal palace are in a neoclassical style. The latter houses the diocesan and comarcal museum and the Museum of Salt (Museu de la Sal), with crystals and objects made from the salt of nearby Cardona.

One of the most important events in the city is Carnaval, a celebration that marks the beginning of Cuaresma (Lent). Tens of thousands of people come from all over Catalonia and beyond, to participate in the celebration that lasts almost one week.

Solsona is home to one of the oldest hunters' association of Catalonia, which held its 75th anniversary in 2015. The city also hosts the only big research centre of Catalonia located outside an urban area, the Forest Sciences Centre of Catalonia (CTFC), with around 100 people employed.

== Notable people ==
- Francesc Ribalta, painter, (1565–1628)
- Cayetano Ripoll, schoolmaster (1778 – 1826)
- Roger Mas, singer–songwriter (born 1975)
- Raül Garrigasait, translator, writer and editor (born 1979)
