= Mort de dama =

Novel by Llorenç Villalonga

Death of a lady
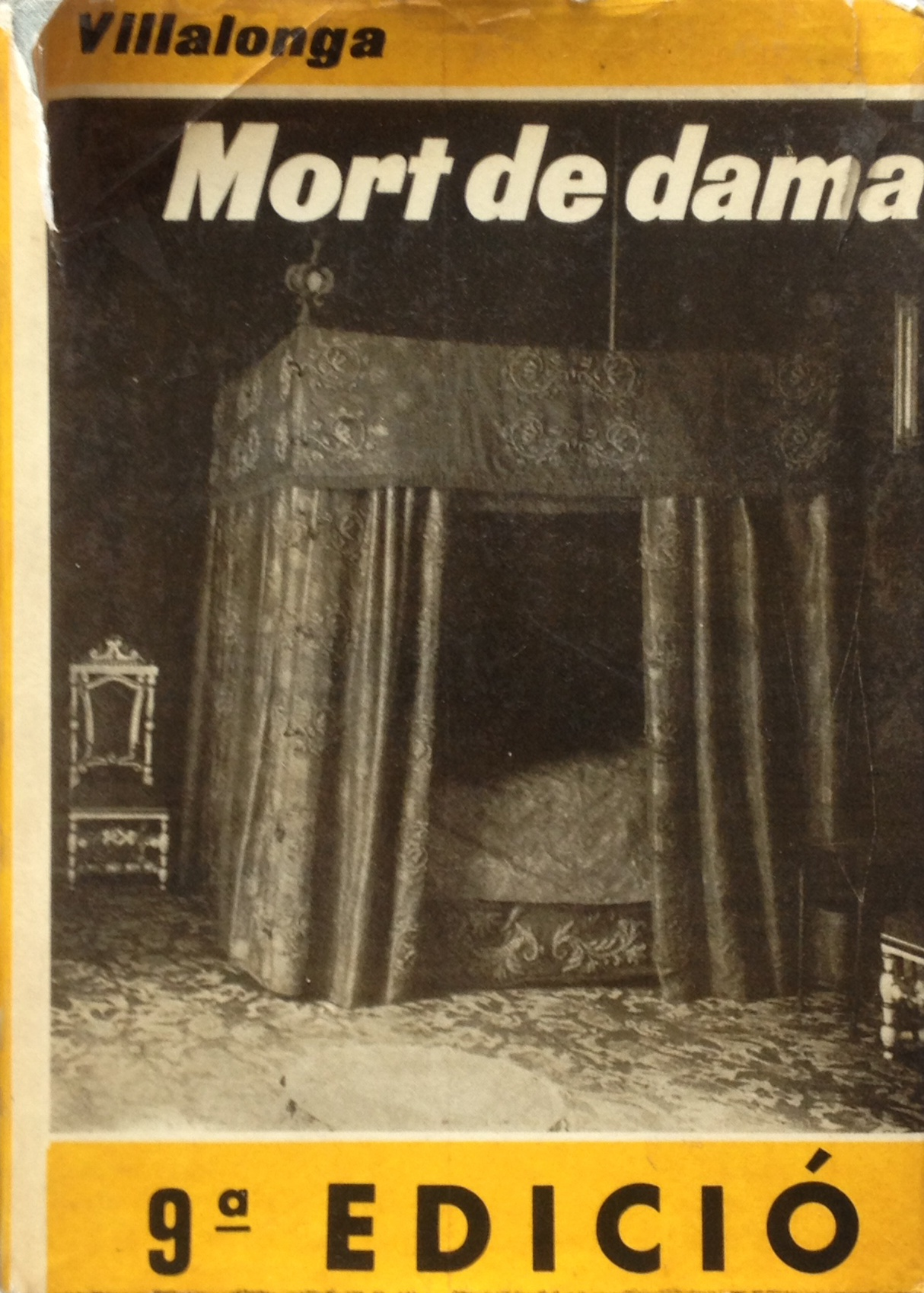
- Author: Llorenç Villalonga
- Original title: Mort de dama
- Language: Catalan
- Publication date: 1931
- Publication place: Spain

Mort de dama (in Catalan: Death of a lady) is the first novel of the Majorcan writer Llorenç Villalonga written in 1931. It is considered one of the first modern novels written in Catalan language from the Balearic Islands. It's a psychological and satirical novel, in which the author carries out a criticism of almost all social estates of that time, except for the Church. At that point, his criticism caused a great controversy among the readers, who made a negative review of the book. Villalonga himself dedicated it to «all those who do not get angry».

== Language ==
At the very beginning, one of the doubts that arise from reading the work is why the author chose the Catalan language instead of an other, like French or Spanish. Although Villalonga mocked those who used it and didn't have a great faith in the future of the language, it is worth noting that, before writing this novel, he had already written several works in Catalan. A possible answer to this question could be that he might have wanted to give the work more plasticity, in other words, he wanted to face the Majorcan society more easily.

== Characters ==
The characters receive a caricaturesque treatment that styles them turning them into grotesque figures.

The most characteristic of them is the woman Obdúlia, who is presented by means of a magnificent parody of herself and of the Majorcan aristocracy that she symbolizes. Nevertheless, the novelist can not hide an admiration movement towards the strong personality of the lady, that places her over the stupidity of the marquess of Collera and over the meanness of Remei Huguet or Mrs. Gradolí, or even the astonishingly elegant Maria Antònia de Bearn.

Who inspired this character was Rosa Ribera Carbonell, an aunt of Villalonga who often came to the writer's parents home, and the rarities of whom annoyed the family.

== Editions ==
Its first edition appeared in 1931, with a preface by Gabriel Alomar and signed as "Dhey", the pseudonym that the author usually used when he signed article in the Majorcan press.

This edition was immediately followed by the second. Important and numerous are the chapter that have been added to the original edition, as well as the modifications of the content. In the Spanish translation, by the author, published in the monthly magazine Brisas, that Villalonga directed and where he wrote to some extent, from the number XVIII (October 1935) to XXV (May 1936), the current tenth chapter was added «Ravings of woman Obdúlia». The 3rd Catalan edition incorporated chapter III «Thirty years ago». The 2nd Spanish edition, by J. Vidal Alcover, published in the magazine Papeles de Son Armadans, volume IV, numbers 10 to 12 (from January to March) and volume V number 13 (April) of 1957, included for the first time chapter II «The first moments», chapter X «That 20th of January», chapter XIX «That's how history is written» and chapter XXIII «At Carme Street». Finally, the 4th Catalan edition (1965) and the complete works edition of 1963 premiered chapter XVIII, «Aina Cohen visits woman Obdúlia». All in all, from the first to the last edition, the work increases in seven the number of chapters.

== Structure ==
The novel presents a vermicular structure and contains an introduction and 25 chapters, 18 of which are found in the original edition and the other 7 were added in ulterior editions. Some of them present flashbacks that bring face to face two phases of woman Obdulia's life. The chapters are the following:

- Introduction: A mild description of the neighbourhood is done, and then, the author tells what happens with an incipient tourism of antagonist customs with respect to the mentality of the old neighbourhood. Gabriel Alomar is mentioned as a "publicist with advanced ideals", who, at the end of the day, is a dissonance. At the end of the chapter, some other characters and their situation are presented, and the author insists again in the effect of foreign traditions- too forward-thinking for the depicted Majorca- have in the neighbourhood.
- I: Un retrat amb quatre dades genealògiques: (A portrait with four genealogical data) it presents a review on woman Obdúlia's ancestors, as well as the genealogy of her personality. It mentions what represents for the soul that society that vanishes.
- II: Els primers moments: (The first moments) Woman Obdúlia is already laying at the bed and Remei, her main assistant, activates the whole protocol that was followed whenever a person of her relevance died. In this chapter there are also remarkable characters that are introduced. The baroness de Bearn (niece of Obdúlia), Mrs. Ramona Curt, Xim (or the boy who smoked abdullahs, personification of the author himself and nephew of the baroness), woman Maria Gradolí with her two daughters and the director of El Adalid. It is also mentioned the former husband of woman Obdúlia, Ramon de Bearn and a woman, sa de Barcelona (Violeta of Palma), of whom it is not well spoken. At the end of the chapter Aina Cohen is also mentioned, the poetess.
- III: Trenta anys enrere: (Thirty years ago) in this chapter there is the first flashback, in which it is reported how woman Obdúlia gets ready to go to the ball of "es Círculo" (the Circle). It is when it happens the famous scene of a misunderstanding that she had with the Archduke Lluís Salvador, who, despite his multilingualism, doesn't appear to understand the hues in woman Obdúlia's words.
- IV: En què es parla del "cometa" i es fa la història del vestit lilà: (In which it is told about the kite and the history of the purple dress is done) It is about the goods of woman Obdúlia (specially of those concerning fashion) and how trendy she was when she was young.
- V: Preparatius per a un viatge: (Preparations for a journey) the visits of the doctors and the priest to woman Obdúlia's are described, and how she denied to take any mediation and how she ripped medical prescriptions. As already mentioned, this is when Obdúlia herself expresses her will to leave her heritage to Remei Huguet.
- VI: Segueix murmurant a l'antecambre: (Keeps murmuring at the antechamber)
- VII: La indignació i l'horror de la senyora Gradolí: (The indignation and horror of Mrs. Gradolí)
- VIII: La mesocràcia de dona Obdúlia i les notes de Miss Carlota Nell: (The mesocracy of woman Obdúlia and notes of Mrs. Carlota Nell)
- IX: Les tristeses d'Aina Cohen: (Aina Cohen's griefs)
- X: Aquell vint de gener: (That 20th of June)
- XI: La baronessa es confessa: (The baroness confesses)
- XII: Depravació de la colònia estrangera: (Depravity of the foreign colony)
- XIII: Bàbia: (Bàbia)
- XIV: Equilibris d'Aina Cohen: (Aina Cohen's balances)
- XV: A l'Ateneo: (At the Ateneo)
- XVI: Una biografia vista per dos costats: (A biography seen by two sides)
- XVII: Enterraments: (Funerals)
- XVIII: Aina Cohen va a veure dona Obdúlia: (Aina Cohen visits woman Obdúlia)
- XIX: Així s'escriu la història: (This is how history is written)
- XX: Desvarieigs de dona Obdúlia: (Ravings of woman Obdúlia)
- XXI: La meva neboda Maria Antònia: (The niece Maria Antònia)
- XXII: ... I la neboda Violesta de Palma: (And the niece Violesta of Palma)
- XXIII: Al career del Carme (At Carme Street)
- XXIV: Fires i festes: (Fairs and feasts)
- XXV: Guanya el dimoni: (The devil wins)

== Reception ==
The publication of the Villalonga's novel didn't go unnoticed for most Majorcan society. The work received hard reviews due to its sarcastic tone it had with them. From left to right, conservatives and progressives, those for and against the Catalan people and culture, they all hardly and viciously criticised the work by Villalonga. Even so, it seems that nobility, although it was mocked as well, it stayed impassive, maybe because they didn't read it or didn't hear about it.

An example of this negative reviews was the one done by members of the Escola Mallorquina, although it might be a bit contradictory. Despite these authors wanting there to be a Majorcan novel in Catalan to promote, they did not accept Mort de dama as so, and they refused it for the virulent way it despised people.

Among the several review that Villalonga received, the one by the writer Miquel Ferrà i Juan in an article in El Día stands out. Ferrà talks very negatively about both the characters and the dialogues and also about the irony used in the text, as well as the language and the model of serpentine realism. He even advises him to quit the culture of letters. (Note: ^{1} For farther information on the dispute about Mort de dama, see Francesc Lladó i Rotger, «La relació entre Miquel Ferrà (Alanís) i Llorenç Villalonga (Dhey)» (in Catalan)..)

Nevertheless, intellectuals like Gabriel Alomar, Joaquim Verdaguer and Màrius Verdaguer had a positive impression on the work. In Catalonia, the work went almost unnoticed.

== Bibliography ==
- Francesc Lladó i Rotger, «La relació entre Miquel Ferrà (Alanís) i Llorenç Villalonga (Dhey)», Randa, 34, pàg. 79-88 (in Catalan).
- Josep M. Llompart, Pròleg a Mort de Dama. Palma: Editorial Moll (WBiblioteca Bàsica de MallorcaW; 14), 2004, pàgs. 7-30 (in Catalan).
- Pere Rosselló; Marc Rosich i Rafel Duran de «Dama: la novel·la» i «Mort de dama: l'adaptació». Pròlegs a l'adaptació teatral de Mort de Dama. Barcelona: Editorial Proa, 2009, pàgs. 9-18 i 19-24 (in Catalan).
