= Club Editor =

Spanish publisher

- Founded: 1959
- Founder: Xavier Benguerel, Joan Sales
- Country of origin: Spain
- Headquarters location: Barcelona
- Key people: María Bohigas Sales
- Official website: www.clubeditor.cat

Club Editor is a Spanish publishing house devoted principally to Catalan literature. Founded in 1959 in Barcelona by two writers, the firm contributed to the development and dissemination of contemporary Catalan novel.

== History ==
Resuming an initiative that had been interrupted by the Spanish Civil War (1936–1939), the publishing house Aymà created in 1955 a collection of contemporary Catalan novel called Club dels Novel·listes («Club of Novelists»). In 1959, Xavier Benguerel and Joan Sales purchased Club dels Novel·listes from Aymà and transformed the collection into the core of a new publishing house: Club Editor. They were both writers: Xavier Benguerel had inaugurated the collection with El Testament (1955), and the fifth volume was Incerta glòria (1956), the masterpiece of Joan Sales.

At the helm of Club Editor, Benguerel and Sales undertook an editorial work that would brought to prominence the best Catalan-language novelists of the second half of the 20th century. To overcome the financial risks of the project, they devised a subscription system that guaranteed a minimum number of copies sold.

Following the retirement of Xavier Benguerel in 1967, Joan Sales's wife, Núria Folch, took over the society, a move that helped circumvent the difficulties Sales faced with the Francoist regime; nevertheless, Sales always remained involved with the firm. After his death, economic problems led Núria Folch to form an alliance with Editorial Columna, a publishing house which was later absorbed by Planeta Group. In 2005, María Bohigas Sales, granddaughter of Sales and Folch, reacquired the publishing house with the support of Edicions de 1984, marking the beginning of a new phase in the history of Club Editor.

== Catalog ==
Cover of the novel Mirall trencat, by Mercè Rodoreda, published by Club Editor

Since its inception, the Club dels Novel·listes collection alternated the publication of contemporary Catalan fiction with translations of notable titles from world literature. This latter category included classics like The Brothers Karamazov, by Fyodor Dostoevsky, but novels written in that period predominated; some examples are Christ Recrucified, by Nikos Kazantzakis; The Leopard, by Giuseppe Tomasi da Lampedusa; or The Bridge on the River Kwai, by Pierre Boulle.

The list of authors in the first category contains major figures of Catalan novel from that period, as well as significant works: Llorenç Villalonga (Bearn, Mort de dama), Mercè Rodoreda (La Plaça del Diamant, Mirall trencat), Maria Aurèlia Capmany (La pluja als vidres), Joan Sales (the aforementioned Incerta glòria). Other authors featured are Jordi Sarsanedas, Josep Maria Espinàs, and Sebastià Juan Arbó. In the 1970s, the series incorporated works by young writers like Guillem Frontera and Maria Antònia Oliver.

In addition to Club dels Novel·listes, the publishing house maintained since 1968 El Pi de les Tres Branques, a collection dedicated to philological and historical essays. Under the direction of María Bohigas, the catalog has continued to be republished, and new authors and works have been added; besides the collections cited above, Club Editor manages La Cara Fosca de les Lletres, Club Editor Jove, La Dula, and Biblioteca Mercè Rodoreda. Realizing a project that her grandfather had always envisioned, Bohigas launched in 2014 La Montaña Pelada series, consisting of works translated into Spanish.
