= Sebastià Juan i Arbó =

Catalonian author (1902–1984)

- Born: 28 October 1902; Sant Carles de la Ràpita, Restoration Spain
- Died: 3 January 1984 (aged 81); Barcelona, Spain
- Spouse: Teresa Bes Guim
- Children: 1
- Writing career
- Language: Catalan; Spanish

Sebastià Juan i Arbó (Catalan pronunciation: [səβəstiˈa ʒuˈan i əɾˈβo]; 28 October 1902 – 3 January 1984) was a Spanish novelist and playwright. He wrote in Catalan and Spanish. He was born in Sant Carles de la Ràpita on 27 October 1902 and died in Barcelona on 3 January 1984. His work includes novels, drama, biographies and translations. He was an honorary member of the Association of Writers in the Catalan Language. In 1948, he won the Premio Nadal (the Nadal Prize).

== Early life ==
Born into a peasant family, at age eight Juan moved with his parents to Amposta, and at twelve and worked in an office. In 1927 he went to Barcelona, where he began his writing career as a journalist for La Vanguardia and ABC, as well as on various editorials.

== Career ==
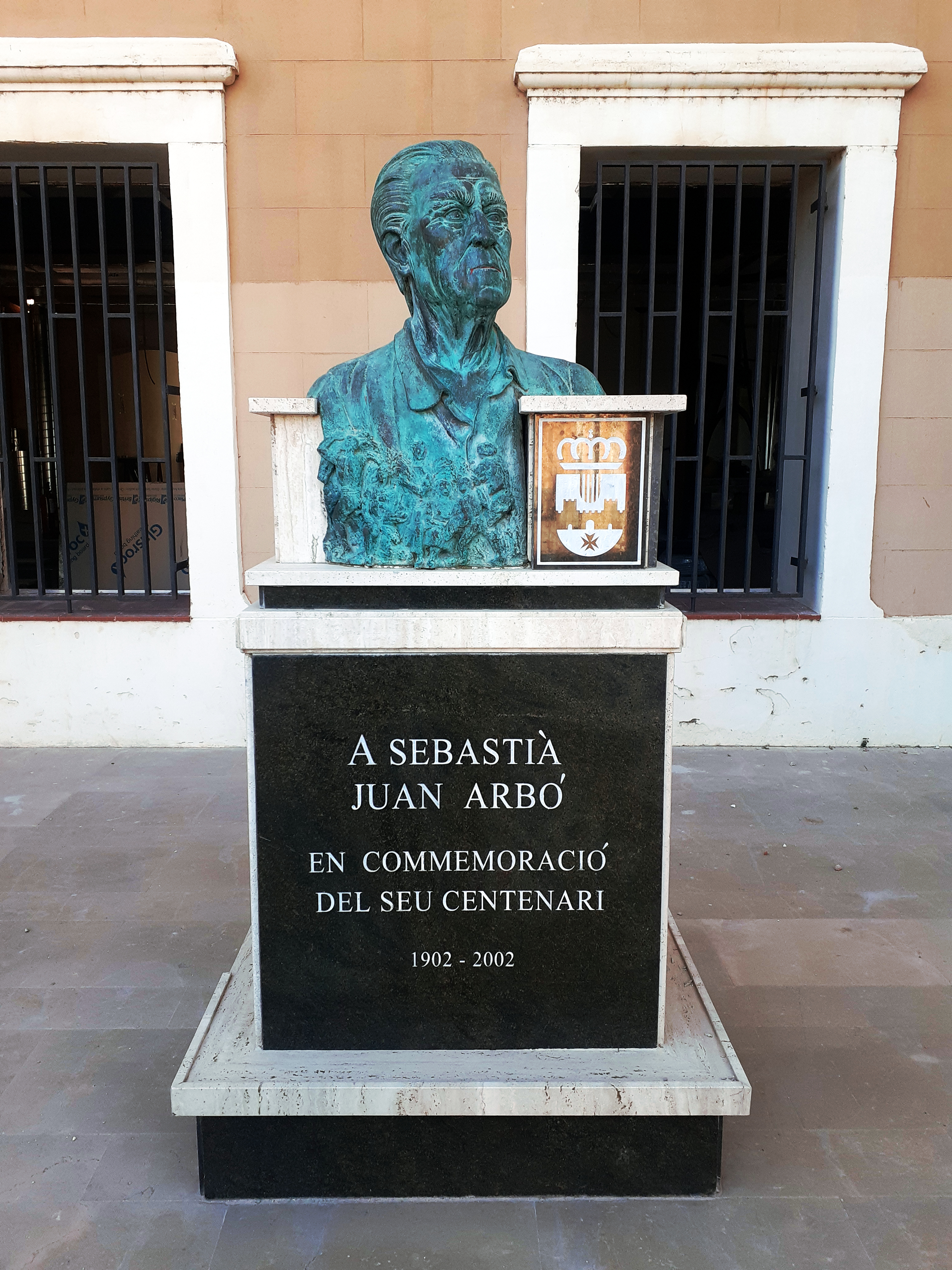
Monument to Juan Arbó, celebrating the 100th anniversary of his birth

In 1931, Juan published his first novel, L'inútil combat ('The Useless Battle').

In 1932, he published Terres de l'Ebre ('Lands of the Ebro'), his best-known work, a novel that describes the situation of the peasants of the Ebro delta, forgotten and humble, working in a hard and thankless land, subject to deadly misfortunes. The novel transforms their personal and community experiences into fiction. In 1933, he published Notes d'un estudiant que va morir boig ('Notes From a Student That Went Insane'), followed by Camins de nit ('Night Roads') in 1935.

After the Civil War he stopped publishing until, in 1947, he released Tino Costa, with versions in Catalan and Spanish. In 1946, he had, however, published a biography, Cervantes.

From 1948, he wrote works in Spanish such as Sobre las piedras grises ('Under the Grey Stones', 1948) which won the Nadal Prize for novels, and especially Martin Masks (1959). In his later years he returned to publishing in Catalan: Narracions d'Delta ('Narrations from the Delta', 1965), L'espera ('Hope', 1948), and La Masia ('The Country House', 1975).

Juan died on 3 January 1984 of a heart attack.

== Works ==
=== Novels ===
- L'inútil combat. Badalona: Proa, 1931 (Barcelona: Proa, 1969). – The futile battle
- Notes d'un estudiant que va morir boig, 1933. (Work was rewritten with the title Hores en blanc. It was published in Spanish with the title The black hour in 1955). – Notes of a student who died insane
- Camins de nit. Badalona: Proa, 1935 (Barcelona: Edicions 62, 1987). – Roads at night
- Hores en blanc. Barcelona: Llibreria Catalònia, 1935 (Barcelona: Laia, 1983; Barcelona: Edicions 62, 1991). – Hours in white
- La ciutat maleïda. Barcelona: Llibreria Catalònia, 1935. – Lands of the Ebro
- Terres de l'Ebre. Barcelona: Llibreria Catalònia, 1936 (Barcelona: Selecta, 1955; Barcelona: Edicions 62, 1980). (Work translated into Italian, French, German and Dutch)
- Tino Costa. Barcelona: Àncora, 1947.
- Sobre las piedras grises. Barcelona: Destino, 1949; Barcelona: Destino, 1973 (5ª ed). – On Gray Stones
- Verdaguer: el poeta, el sacerdot i el món. Barcelona: Aedos, 1952. – Verdaguer: poet, priest and the world
- Martín de Caretas. 1955-1959 – Martin of Caretas
- Los hombres de la tierra y el mar. Barcelona: Llibreria Editorial Argos, 1961. (1965 ??) – Men of the land and sea
- L'hora negra seguit de Divertiments: la nit de Sant Joan. Barcelona: Selecta, 1961. – The time followed by black entertainments: the night of San Juan
- Narracions del Delta. Barcelona: Selecta, 1965 – Stories of the Delta
- Obra catalana completa, I. Novel.les de l'Ebre. Barcelona: Edicions 62, 1966. – Complete Catalan Works 1 Novels of the Ebro
- L'espera. Barcelona: Club Editor, 1968 (1965?) – The waiting
- Obras selectas. Barcelona: AHR, 1973 – Select works
- La Masia. Barcelona: Selecta, 1975 (Barcelona: Orbis, 1984) – The Farmhouse
- La tempestad. Espluguas de Llobregat: Plaza & Janés, 1978. – The Tempest
- El segundo del Apocalipsis. Espluguas de Llobregat: Plaza & Janés, 1981 – The second of the Apocalypse
- Memorias: los hombres de la ciudad. Barcelona: Editorial Planeta, 1982. – Memories: Men of the city
- Obra catalana completa (edited by Emili Rosales). Barcelona: Columna, 1992–1993 (3 volumes). – Catalan complete work
- Viatge a l'Ebre. Barcelona: Columna-Tresmall, 1997. – Journey to the Ebro

=== Theatre ===
- La ciutat maleïda. Barcelona: Llibreria Catalònia, 1935 – The damn city
- Despertar. 1936 – Awakening
- Nausica. Barcelona: La Rosa dels Vents, 1937.

=== Biographies ===
- La vida trágica de Mosèn Jacinto Verdaguer. 1951 Barcelona: Planeta/Aedos, 1970 – The tragic life of Mosen Jacinto Verdaguer
- Pío Baroja y su tiempo. Barcelona: Planeta, 1969. – Pio Baroja and his time
- Cervantes (hombre y época). Barcelona: 1948; Barcelona: Planeta, 1971. – Cervantes (Man and era)

== Awards ==
- Fastenrath, Floral Games of Barcelona 1934. For the work Terres de l'Ebre.
- Novelistas Award, Municipality of Barcelona, 1936. For the work Camins de nit.
- Nadal Prize, 1948. For the work Sobre las piedras grises.
