= Marta Orriols =

Spanish writer

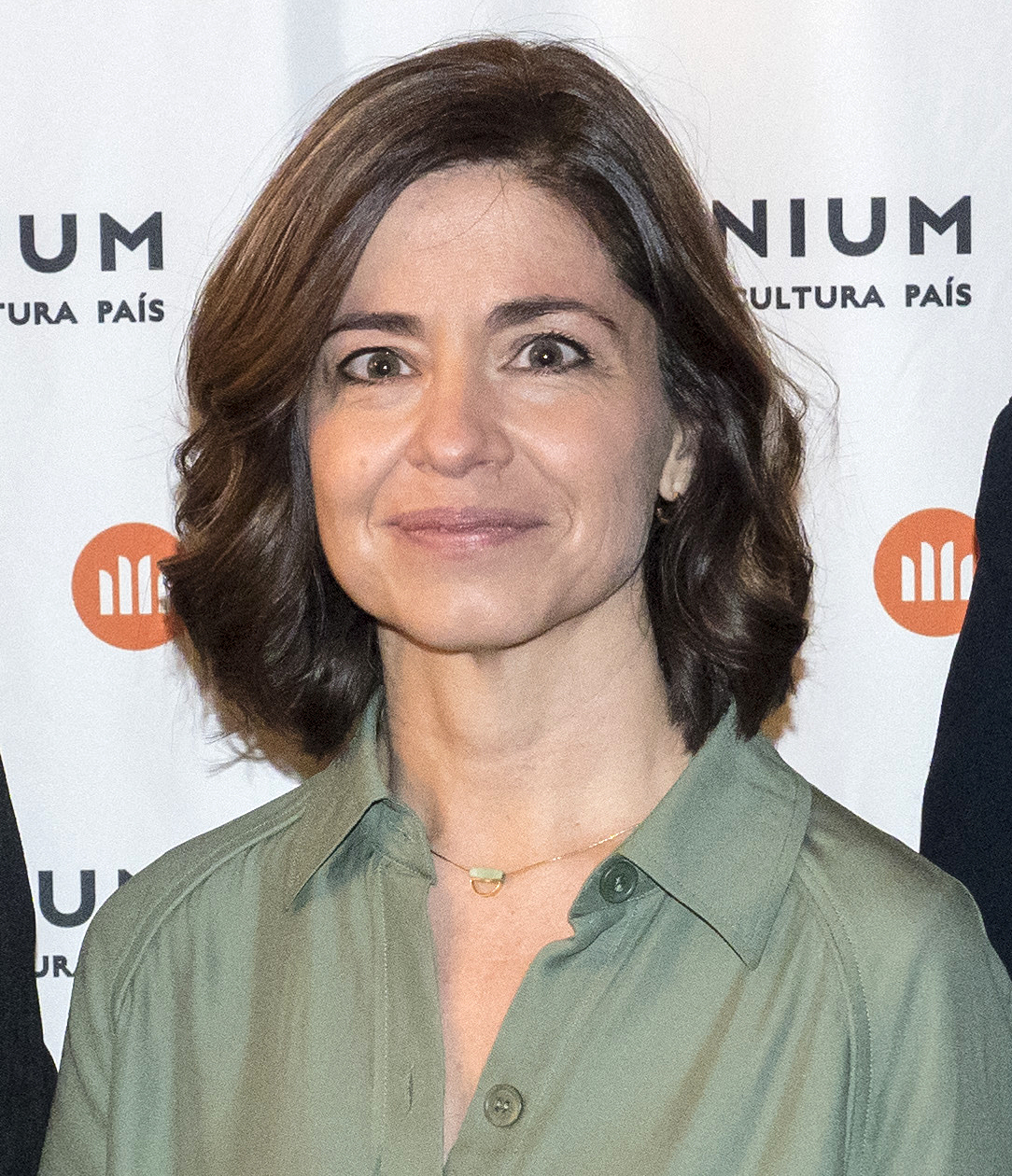
- Orriols in 2019
- Born: Marta Orriols; 1975 (age 50–51); Sabadell, Catalonia, Spain
- Occupation: writer
- Writing career
- Language: Catalan, Spanish
- Genre: novel
- Notable work: Learning to talk to plants (2020)
- Notable awards: Òmnium Prize award for best Catalan Novel (2018)

Marta Orriols (Sabadell, 1975) is a Catalan writer from Spain.

She studied cinematographic scriptwriting at the Bande à Part film school in Barcelona and creative writing at the Ateneu Barcelonès. She received the 2018 Òmnium Prize for best Catalan-language novel by Òmnium Cultural, the No Llegiu Prize, and the Illa dels Llibres Prize for Best Novel of 2018. Her novel has been translated to several languages, including English (Learning to talk to plants, published by Pushkin Press) and French. She lives in Barcelona with her two sons.
