= Solsona Cathedral =

Church in Solsona, Spain

Coordinates: 41°59′39″N 1°31′10″E

Cathedral of Saint Mary of Solsona
- Catedral de Santa Maria de Solsona (Catalan)
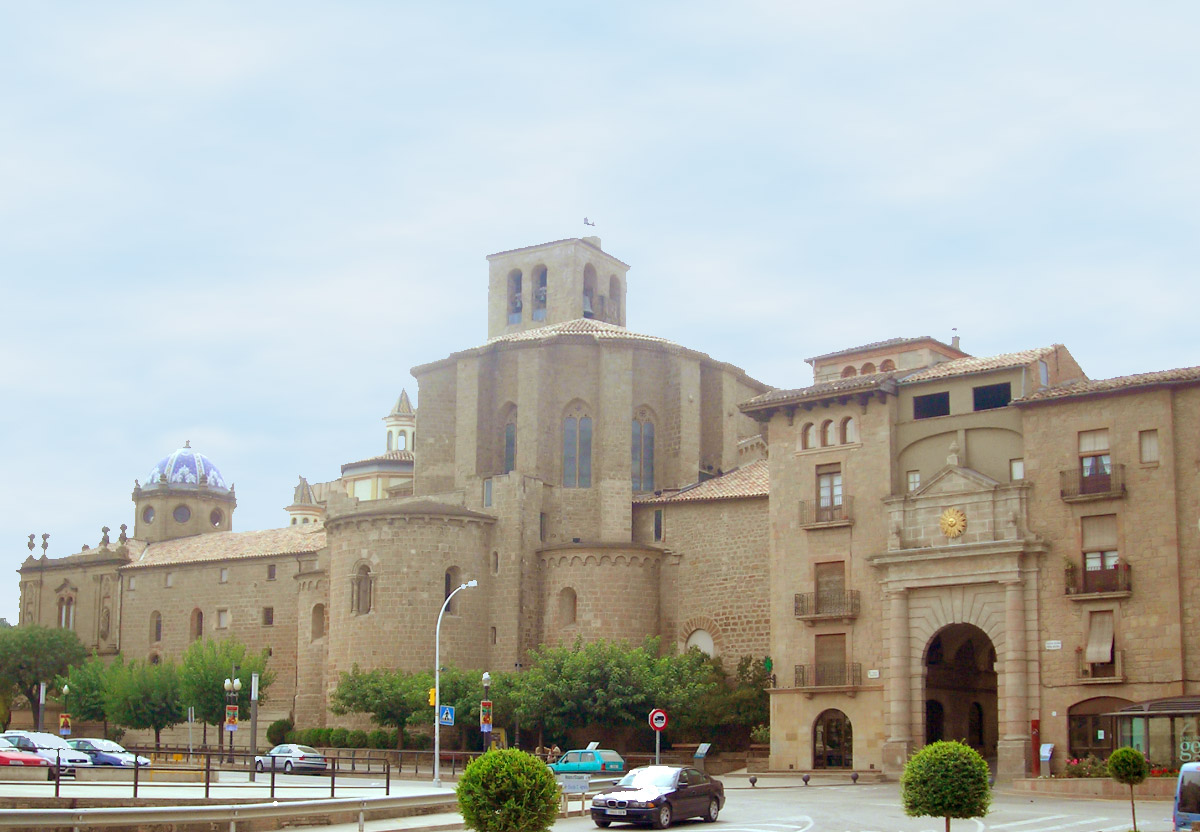
- Cathedral of Solsona

Religion
- Affiliation: Catholic Church

Location
- Location: Solsona, Catalonia, Spain
- Interactive map of Cathedral of Saint Mary of Solsona

Architecture
- Type: church
- Style: Gothic, Romanesque, Baroque
- Groundbreaking: 1299
- Completed: 1630

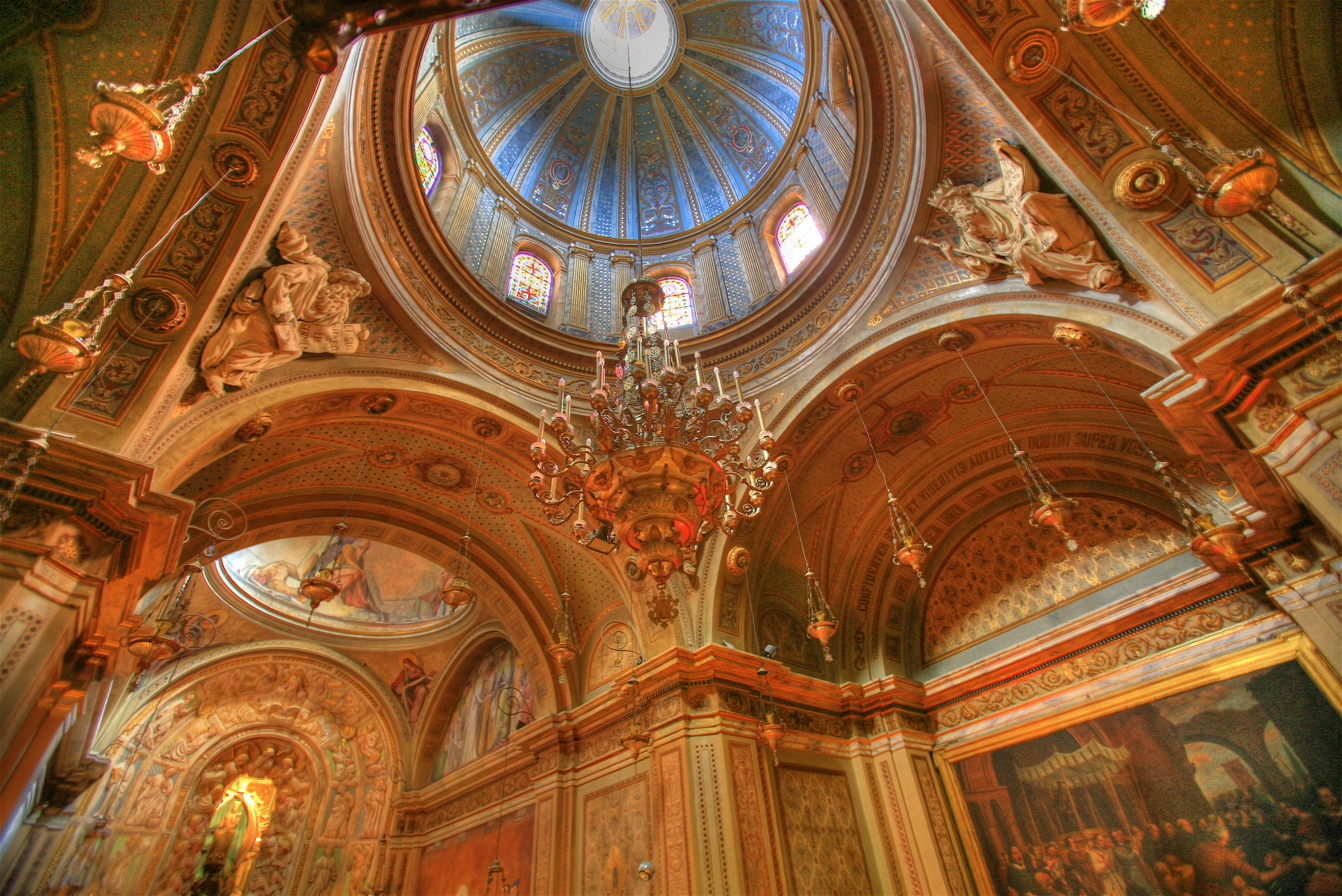
Interior and cupola of the Cathedral of Solsona

The Cathedral of Saint Mary of Solsona (Catalan: Catedral de Santa Maria de Solsona) is a cathedral in Solsona, Catalonia, Spain. It was built between the 12th and 18th centuries, in a mix of the Romanesque, Gothic, and Baroque styles.

== History ==
While most of the structure dates from the 14th century, elements of the original Romanesque church consecrated in 1163 still remain. These include the Romanesque apse (featuring a window with archivolts, two columns, and capitals), two apsidioles (the northern one raised), and a square-plan bell tower—its upper part dating from the 16th century—with well-adorned windows framed by archivolts, capitals, and columns. Also Romanesque are some blocked-up windows on the north façade, and a doorway in the Lleida school style that leads to the cloister. This doorway, dating from the 18th century, features a splayed arch, columns, and carved capitals. The original Romanesque church of Santa Maria had its monastery nearby, attached to its walls. It was located where the Episcopal Palace of Solsona now stands.

The bulk of the cathedral was built in the Gothic style, begun in 1299 and completed in 1630 with the construction of the presbytery. On the left side of the transept, the parish chapel contains a Baroque altarpiece dedicated to the Virgin of Mercy.

In the 18th century, under the initiative of Bishop Rafael Lasala i Locela, the narthex and the Gate of Saint Augustine were constructed, which led to the destruction of the original Romanesque main portal.

== Image of the Virgin of the Cloister ==
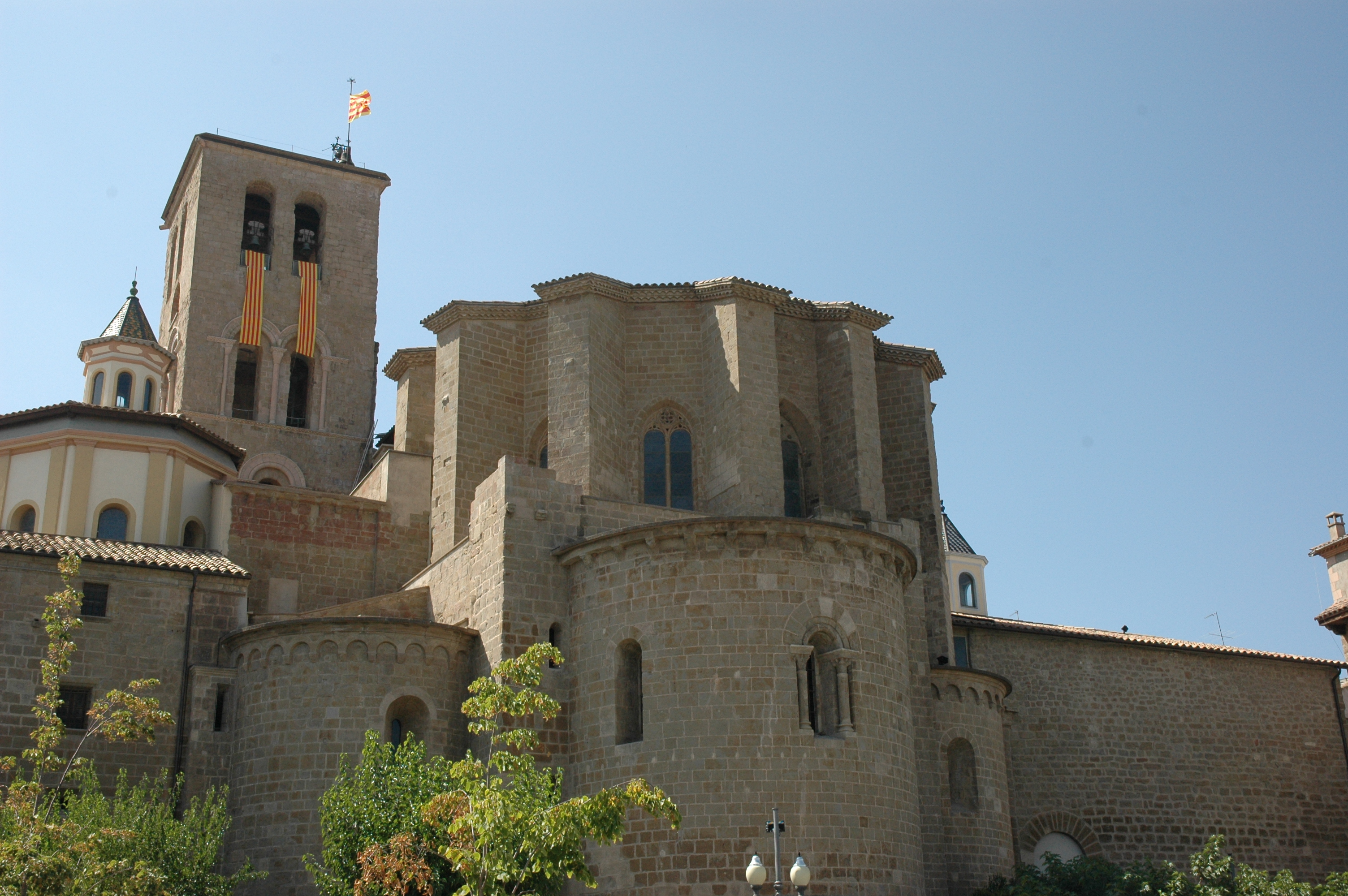
View of the cathedral

To the right stands the Chapel of the Cloister, where the image of the Virgin of the Cloister Catalan: Mare de Déu del Claustre, patroness of the city, is venerated. It is a stone sculpture from the late 12th century, considered one of the most important works of Catalan Romanesque sculpture.

The image was created by Master Gilabert (Gilabertus) of Toulouse, one of the most prominent sculptors of the period. The statue measures 105 cm in height. The Virgin is seated on a throne, holding the Child on her lap, and beneath her feet are two carved monsters. The stone has darkened with age.

In the 13th century, during the arrival of the Albigensians, the statue was hidden in the newly built cloister well to protect it from possible desecration. A local legend tells of a child who fell into the well and was miraculously saved by the Virgin Mary—a story that appears to have historical basis.

During the Spanish Civil War in 1936, religious images were again at risk. The statue was hidden inside the bell tower's casing and later evacuated to France. After the war, it required restoration, as the figure of the Child had suffered some damage.
