= Gastón Gaudio =

Argentine tennis player

- Gaudio in 2018
- Country (sports): Argentina
- Residence: Buenos Aires, Argentina
- Born: 9 December 1978 (age 47) Temperley, Argentina
- Height: 1.75 m (5 ft 9 in)
- Turned pro: 1996
- Retired: 2011
- Plays: Right-handed (one-handed backhand)
- Prize money: US$6,066,156

Singles
- Career record: 270–196 (57.9%)
- Career titles: 8
- Highest ranking: No. 5 (25 April 2005)

Grand Slam singles results
- Australian Open: 3R (2002, 2005, 2006)
- French Open: W (2004)
- Wimbledon: 2R (2002, 2006)
- US Open: 3R (2002, 2006)

Other tournaments
- Tour Finals: SF (2005)
- Olympic Games: 1R (2000)

Doubles
- Career record: 26–39 (40.0%)
- Career titles: 3
- Highest ranking: No. 78 (14 June 2004)

Grand Slam doubles results
- Australian Open: 3R (2004)
- French Open: 3R (2004)
- US Open: 1R (2003, 2004)

Gastón Norberto Gaudio (Spanish pronunciation: [ɡasˈtoŋ ˈɡawðjo]; (Note: In isolation, Gastón is pronounced [ɡasˈton].) born 9 December 1978) is an Argentine former professional tennis player. He was ranked as high as world No. 5 in men's singles by the Association of Tennis Professionals, achieved in April 2005. Gaudio won eight ATP Tour-level singles titles, including a major at the 2004 French Open, coming from two sets down in the final to defeat compatriot Guillermo Coria.

== Early life ==
Gaudio learned the game at the Temperley Lawn Tennis Club, and his first coach was Roberto Carruthers. He was the youngest of 3 children in his family. In addition to tennis Gaudio played football and rugby as a child and chose tennis to help out his parents financially when their business ran into economic problems.

== Tennis career ==
Gaudio started playing tennis at the age of six. He finished as No. 2 in Argentine juniors in 1996 and turned professional the same year.

=== 1996-1997 ===
Gaudio finished as No. 2 junior in Argentina in 1996. Gaudio was ranked at 639 in the world in 1997.

=== 1998: Top 150 ===
In 1998 he reached four ATP Challenger finals during the second half of the year and won three of them. He won in Elche with a victory over fellow Argentine Diego Hipperdinger in July. He lost in Belo Horizonte to Brazilian Francisco Costa, and won in Santa Cruz with a victory over Ecuadorian Luis Morejón, both in August. He finished the year by winning in Santiago defeating Karim Alami and ranked world No. 138.

=== 1999: Top 70 ===
Gaudio won two consecutive Challengers in Nice and Espinho defeating Jacobo Díaz and Markus Hipfl, respectively. Gaudio's first notable performance was when he reached the third round at the French Open as a qualifier, so he won five matches total at the event, including coming back from two sets to love down in the second round against Bernd Karbacher to win, then losing to world No. 6 Àlex Corretja. He finished the year ranked No. 73.

=== 2000: Top 25 ===
2000 saw Gaudio establish himself on the main tour and win his only Challenger of the year in Braunschweig over countryman Franco Squillari. In addition to his Challenger title, Gaudio made the semifinals in Auckland, Santiago and, in his most impressive performance of the season, the Monte Carlo Masters, where he defeated Marat Safin, Félix Mantilla, Julien Boutter, and Juan Carlos Ferrero without dropping a set, before losing to Slovakia's Dominik Hrbatý in a tough three-set match. Gaudio also made the final of Stuttgart, again playing against fellow-Argentine Franco Squillari. Gaudio lost the final in five sets despite having beaten his opponent soundly in the Gstaad quarterfinals and in the Braunschweig finals earlier in the year (both on clay) and leading Squillari 2 sets to 1 in Stuttgart. Gaudio also represented Argentina in his first Olympic Games, losing to Vladimir Voltchkov of Belarus in the first round. He finished the year ranked No. 34.

=== 2001: Second ATP final ===
Gaudio started his 2001 in poor fashion, losing his first four matches of the season to Vladimir Voltchkov, former French Open finalist Andrei Medvedev, three-time French Open winner Gustavo Kuerten, and, in his Davis Cup debut, Mexican Bruno Echagaray. Gaudio soon went back to his winning ways, however, reaching the final of Viña del Mar, losing to bitter rival and countryman Guillermo Coria. Gaudio would avenge that defeat to Coria in a hard-fought victory in the quarterfinals of Buenos Aires, which involved both players making rude gestures and insulting each other regularly. After this victory, Gaudio lost in the semifinals to José Acasuso. In the American hard-court swing after the 2001 Australian Open, he made the quarterfinals of the Miami Masters, losing to 19th seed Jan-Michael Gambill. Along the way, Gaudio dismantled fifth seed Russian Yevgeny Kafelnikov, and toughed out a three-set slugfest against future French Open winner and 12th seed Juan Carlos Ferrero. Although he did not manage to win his first title in 2001, Gaudio had some success, making a final, a semifinal and four quarterfinals (one of them at the prestigious Miami Masters). In addition to this, he helped Argentina return to the World Group with a perfect 5–0 record in his singles matches, which were all played in Argentina on clay courts. The year was not great though; Gaudio lost a lot of early-round matches and an astounding 12 first-round matches, never making it past the first round of a Grand Slam. Because of his inability to win these early-round matches, Gaudio's ranking slipped from No. 34 at the beginning of the year to No. 48 at the end of 2001.

=== 2002: First ATP title ===
Gaudio had a decent start to his 2002 campaign, making the third round of the Australian Open and the quarterfinals of Indian Wells Masters as well as the round of 16 at Miami Masters. Continuing on from his successful Davis Cup debut, in 2002 Gaudio defeated Ivo Karlović in the fifth match to secure a semifinal place for Argentina. Gaudio also won the first tournament of his career in Barcelona without dropping a set. Gaudio defeated world No. 1 and US Open champion Lleyton Hewitt in the semifinals, and then dismissed Spaniard and French Open winner of the same year Albert Costa, in the final. Gaudio followed up his maiden title with another in Mallorca a week later.

Gaudio made the fourth round of the French Open, losing to Juan Carlos Ferrero, in five sets, having led 4–1 in the final set. After Roland Garros, Gaudio made the final in Gstaad and the semifinals in Kitzbühel, losing on both occasions to Àlex Corretja. In the Davis Cup semifinals against Russia, Gaudio was leading 5–1 in the fifth set against Yevgeny Kafelnikov and had a match point, which was overruled by umpire Jorge Dias in Kafelnikov's favour, who then went on to take the set 8–6 and the match. He finished the year ranked No. 21.

=== 2003: Top 20 ===
There were no titles for Gaudio in 2003, but he was involved in two controversies, the first of them involved compatriot Guillermo Coria in the Hamburg Masters. They were part of an all-Argentine semifinal lineup, the others being David Nalbandian and Agustín Calleri. Gaudio and Coria played in one semifinal, and Coria won the first set and Gaudio the second. Coria took an injury timeout for cramps. After the timeout, Coria, after breaking serve at the change of ends beat his left breast while staring at his opponent, which Gaudio took as an insult. Coria proceeded to win the last set 6–0, and there was allegedly a confrontation after the match in the locker room.

The other was the Davis Cup in the semifinals against Spain in Málaga, where the two top Argentine players Guillermo Coria and David Nalbandian were unavailable due to injury. An out-of-form Gaudio was called up along with Agustín Calleri, Mariano Zabaleta, and Lucas Arnold. Although Gaudio had a 4–0 singles record from the first round and quarterfinals coming into the semifinals, Spain won 3–2, with Gaudio losing both of his singles matches. In the first rubber against Juan Carlos Ferrero, he lost 14 games in a row in a 4–6, 0–6, 0–6 defeat. In the fifth and deciding rubber against Carlos Moyà, he lost in straight sets and was roundly criticized back in Argentina for these performances. "When I returned to Buenos Aires after playing Davis Cup in Moscow and Málaga, you had the impression it was my fault and that hurt me," he said. He finished the year ranked No. 34.

=== 2004: French Open title & top 10 ===
2004 started slowly for Gaudio, but he eventually reached the final in Barcelona, losing to Tommy Robredo in five sets, then posted two victories in the World Team Cup over Martin Verkerk and Lleyton Hewitt.

Gaudio came into the French Open ranked 44th and was unseeded for the tournament. In the first round, he upset top-10 player and compatriot Guillermo Cañas over two days in five sets. Then he won another five-set match against Jiří Novák. Gaudio dropped only one more set en route to the final, as he defeated Thomas Enqvist, Igor Andreev, Lleyton Hewitt, and David Nalbandian to set up an unprecedented all-Argentine final with world No. 3, then-reigning "King of Clay", and pre-tournament favourite Guillermo Coria.

In the final, Gaudio defeated Coria in five sets after Coria had served for the match at 6-5 in the fifth set and had two championship points. Gaudio became the first Argentine to win a Grand Slam since Guillermo Vilas in 1979, and the first man ever to win a Grand Slam after losing the first set 6–0. He became the fifth-lowest-ranked player to win a Grand Slam, the first man in the open era to win a Grand Slam having saved match points in the final. Gaudio reached the top 10 in the ATP Entry rankings for the first time. Gaudio had achieved his childhood dream by winning at Roland Garros. He stated that his father, Norberto, who overcame a life-threatening illness, as the biggest inspiration for him.

Gaudio would not reach another Grand Slam quarterfinal for the remainder of his career. In fact, the 2004 French Open was the only occasion he progressed past the fourth round of a grand slam tournament.

Gaudio did not play Wimbledon and returned to the tour in July. He made 3 finals in 3 weeks: in Båstad losing to his friend Mariano Zabaleta, in Stuttgart losing to compatriot Guillermo Cañas in 5 sets, and in Kitzbühel losing to Nicolás Massú. He also made his first appearance at the Tennis Masters Cup, where he lost all 3 matches in the Round Robin stage. He finished the year ranked world No. 10. It was also a golden age in tennis for Argentina as an unprecedented 3 Argentine players finished in top 10 (Guillermo Coria finished No. 7, David Nalbandian finished No. 9).

=== 2005: Top 5 ===
Gaudio consolidated his top-10 ranking in 2005, by winning five tournaments and his record of 42–8 on clay is second only to Nadal. He also reached his career-high ranking of No. 5 in April.

Gaudio and Coria were at the centre of another dispute at the World Team Cup where Gaudio said, "Let's be truthful, this isn't a team, because there's someone who makes decisions choosing the best for himself. I can understand that a player gets tired and decides to rest before Paris. I also did so on Tuesday against the Czechs but not in the most important match of all. Coria and I were the best team and if we were a real team this wouldn't have happened."

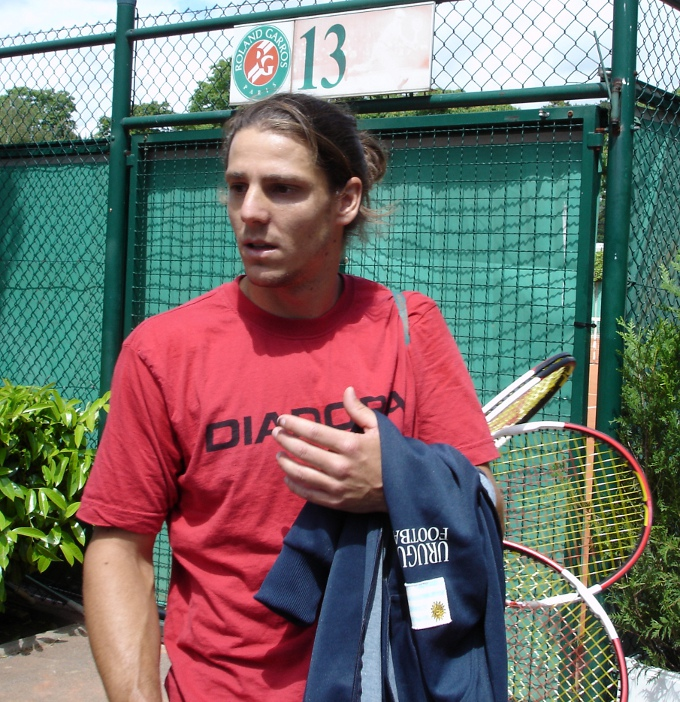
Gaudio during the 2005 French Open

He lost in the fourth round of Roland Garros to David Ferrer after leading 4–0 in the fifth set and losing six consecutive games. When leading in the fifth set, Gaudio said to Ferrer's coach at one point, "Don't worry; I'm not going to win today." Gaudio also qualified again for the Tennis Masters Cup, where he made the semifinals, defeating Mariano Puerta and Fernando González, but losing to Nikolay Davydenko in the round-robin stage, before losing to Roger Federer, 0–6, 0–6, in the semifinals. He finished the year ranked world No. 10 for the second consecutive year. For the second consecutive year, 3 Argentines finished in the top 10 (Nalbandian finished No. 6, Coria finished No. 8).

=== 2006: 250 career wins ===
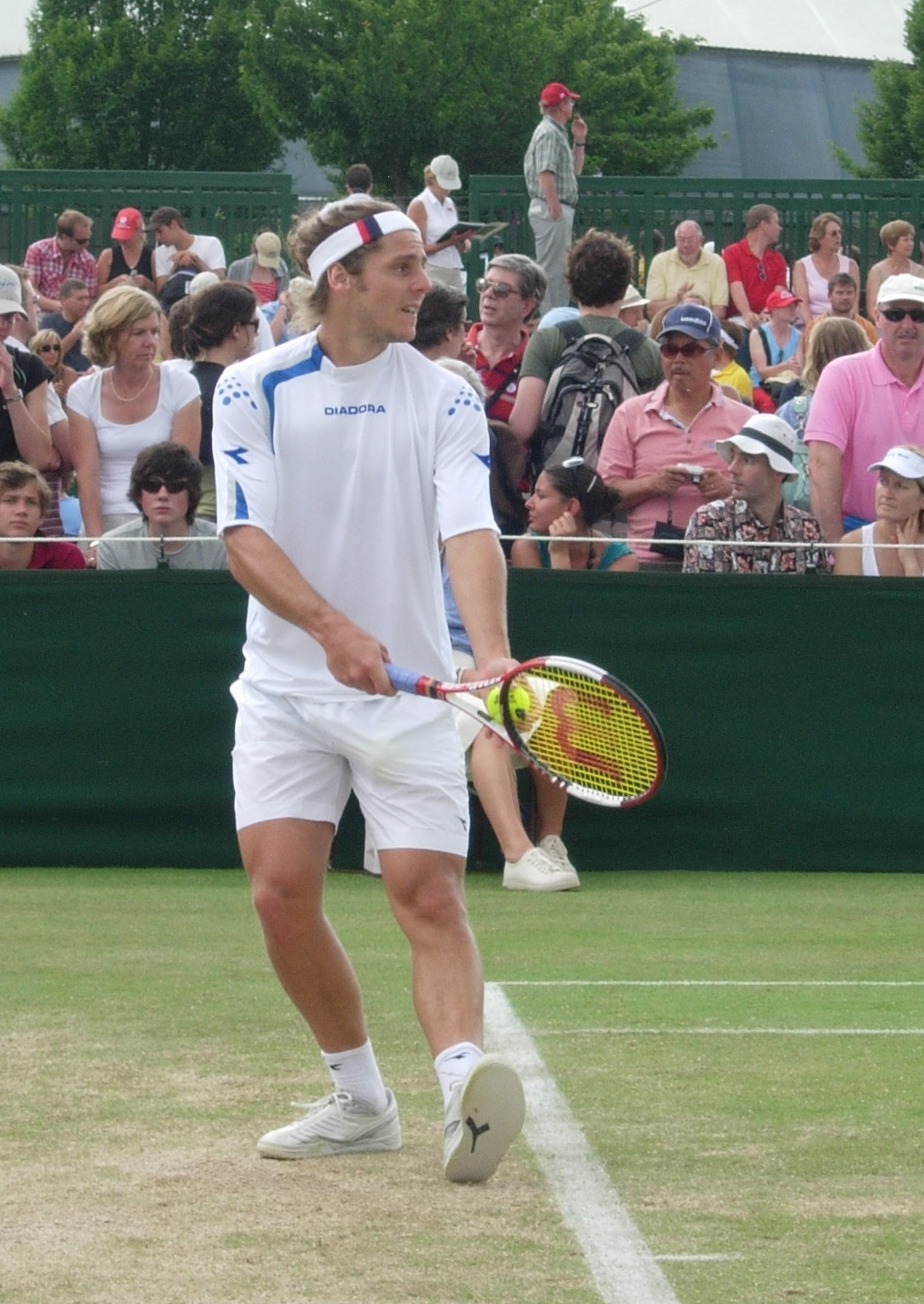
Gastón Gaudio at the 2006 Wimbledon Championships

Gaudio was not able to keep up his level of play to the standards he set from mid-2004 to 2005. His best performances for 2006 included semifinals in Acapulco and the Monte Carlo Masters. He finished the year ranked at No. 34. Ranked in the top 10, Gaudio started 2006 off well at the French Open, where he lost in the fourth round in four sets to Russia's Nikolay Davydenko. Gaudio lost at the second round in Wimbledon to Irakli Labadze (a qualifier) and lost his 2006 US Open third-round match to Marc Gicquel.

=== 2007 ===
Gaudio started 2007 poorly and lost eight consecutive matches stretching back to 2006, before recording a victory over Luis Horna, who retired from the match with a strained hamstring. Gaudio followed up with a conventional win against Juan Pablo Guzmán, before losing to former world No. 1 Juan Carlos Ferrero in the quarterfinals of Acapulco. At the French Open, he won his first-round match against Marc Gicquel (he lost to him the previous year) in five sets. He was to face former world No. 1, Lleyton Hewitt, seeded 14th for the tournament, and won the first two sets. Despite the lead, however, Hewitt fought back and won the next three sets, thus the match. As a result, Gaudio's ranking dropped to No. 99. In late 2007, Gaudio's ATP ranking had fallen to No. 180. During the second part of the year, he started to play clay-court Challenger events in Europe to attempt to rebuild his career, but he suffered an ankle injury while playing in the Naples Challenger.

=== 2008 ===
Gaudio only played two matches during the entire season. He came back in January 2008 at a Challenger event in Miami, Florida. He lost in the opening round, to Kei Nishikori. Later in the month, Gaudio continued his comeback attempt at the Movistar Open in Viña del Mar, Chile. Granted a wild card into the main draw of the tournament, Gaudio lost to Santiago Ventura, in the first round. He did not play another match for the remainder of the 2008 season.

Gaudio finished the 2008 season unranked as a result of not winning a single match over a period of 12 months, causing his ranking points to fall to 0 by 22 September 2008.

=== 2009 ===
In January, Gaudio reached the quarterfinals of Iquique Challenger, where he retired without completing a single game. It was his first match played after a few days short of an entire year.

In February 2009, he received a wild card into the main draw for the Buenos Aires tournament, an ATP World Tour 250 event in his home country. Gaudio lost to Daniel Gimeno Traver of Spain in the first round.

He received another wild card into the main draw in the Barcelona tournament, an ATP World Tour 500 event, where he won his first match on the world tour since the 2007 French Open by defeating Diego Junqueira of Argentina, before losing his second-round match to Tommy Robredo.

Gaudio won a tournament after almost four years at the Tunis Challenger. He beat Portuguese Frederico Gil, in the final. Gaudio was awarded a wild card into the 2009 French Open, where he was beaten by Czech Radek Štěpánek in the first round. In October, he made the final of the Buenos Aires Challenger, losing to training partner Horacio Zeballos.

Gaudio finished the 2009 season ranked at No. 167.

=== 2010 ===
In an interview on the Argentine program Vertigo, Gaudio revealed that he had received psychiatric treatment for clinical depression during his time away from tennis. After a poor start in 2010, he won the San Remo Challenger, defeating countryman Martín Vassallo Argüello.

In an unlikely turn of events, Gaudio returned to the French Open to play in the qualifying. He posted an impressive victory over American Lester Cook in the first round but was taken out by Thiago Alves in straight sets in his next match.

Gaudio announced his retirement from tennis on 30 August 2011, although his last match played was on 2 August 2010 at the Kitzbühel Challenger where he lost in the first round, more than a year prior.

== Career statistics ==
=== Grand Slam singles performance timelines ===
Key
**W**	F	SF	QF	#R	RR	Q#	DNQ	A	NH

(W) winner; (F) finalist; (SF) semifinalist; (QF) quarterfinalist; (#R) rounds 4, 3, 2, 1; (RR) round-robin stage; (Q#) qualification round; (DNQ) did not qualify; (A) absent; (NH) not held; (SR) strike rate (events won / competed); (W–L) win–loss record.

Tournament	1996	1997	1998	1999	2000	2001	2002	2003	2004	2005	2006	2007	2008	2009	2010	2011	SR	W–L
Australian Open	A	A	A	A	1R	1R	3R	2R	2R	3R	3R	1R	A	A	A	A	0 / 8	8–8
French Open	A	A	A	3R	2R	1R	4R	3R	**W**	4R	4R	2R	A	1R	Q2	A	1 / 10	22–9
Wimbledon	A	Q1	Q1	1R	1R	1R	2R	1R	A	A	2R	A	A	A	A	A	0 / 6	2–6
US Open	A	A	A	1R	1R	1R	3R	1R	2R	1R	3R	A	A	Q1	A	A	0 / 8	5–8
Win–loss	0–0	0–0	0–0	2–3	1–4	0–4	8–4	3–4	9–2	5–3	8–4	1–2	0–0	0–1	0–0	0–0	1 / 32	37–31

=== Finals: 1 (1 title) ===
Outcome	Year	Championship	Surface	Opponent	Score
Win	2004	French Open	Clay	(Argentina) Guillermo Coria	0–6, 3–6, 6–4, 6–1, 8–6

=== Year-end championship performance timeline ===
Tournament	1996	1997	1998	1999	2000	2001	2002	2003	2004	2005	2006	2007	2008	2009	2010	2011	SR	W–L
ATP World Tour Finals	Did not qualify								RR	SF	Did not qualify						0 / 2	2–5

=== Records ===
==== Open Era records ====
- This record was attained in the Open Era of tennis.
- Records in **bold** indicate peer-less achievements.

Time span	Selected Grand Slam tournament records	Players matched
2004 French Open	Won a Grand Slam final from two sets down.	Björn Borg; Ivan Lendl; Andre Agassi; Dominic Thiem; Novak Djokovic; Rafael Nadal; Jannik Sinner; Carlos Alcaraz
