= El Adalid =

Spanish Catholic weekly newspaper

El Adalid was a Catholic weekly newspaper published from Torrelavega, Spain, between 1906 and 1917.

== History and profile ==
The first issue of El Adalid was published on 19 March 1906 and was directed by Ceferino Calderón.

The newspaper was the most militant Catholic publication in Cantabria. El Adalid had a traditionalist editorial line, and denounced liberalism as 'the banner of Lucifer'. The Catholic Electoral Centre was formed around El Adalid and the newspaper was an important cornerstone in the campaign to elect José María Gutiérrez Calderón as provincial deputy in its year of foundation.

El Besaya (published 1918–1919) was launched as a substitute to El Adalid. However, El Besaya had a more modernist approach that El Adalid.
