= Imma Monsó =

Spanish fiction writer (born 1959)

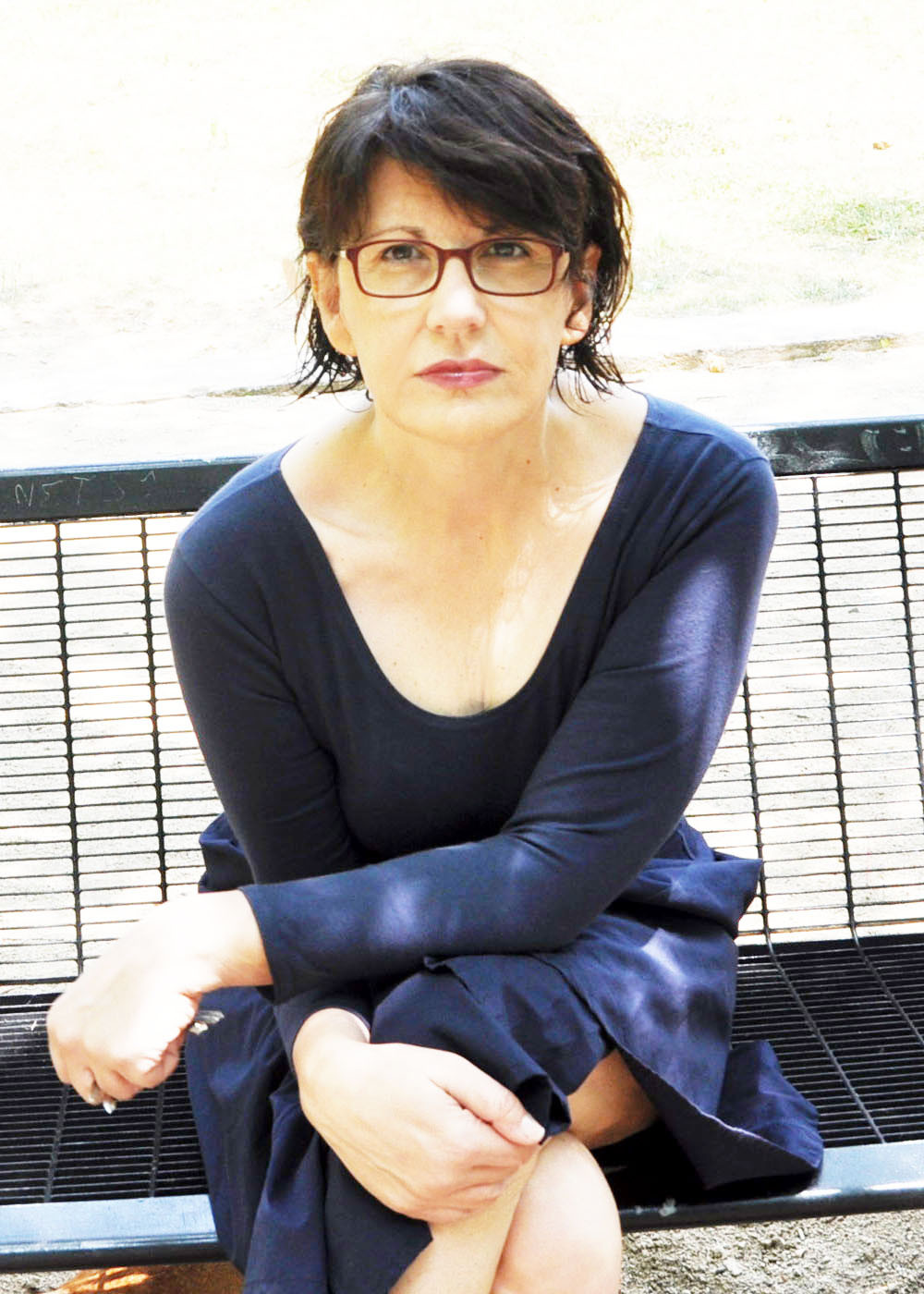
Imma Monsó

Imma Monsó (born in 1959 in Lleida, Catalonia) is a Spanish fiction writer.

Monsó is known mainly for her humorous and poignant novels and for blending an absurdist wit with a profound tenderness for her very singular characters. Monso is graduated from University of Barcelona, Spain and University of Caen Normandy in France. She is a high school teacher and writes for the main Spanish and Catalan newspapers like El País and La Vanguardia. All her literary works has been translated into Spanish, and most of them to several languages. She has received numerous awards for her literary works.

== Published works ==
=== Novels ===
- No se sap mai (One never knows) (1996)
- Com unes vacances (Like a holiday) (1998)
- Tot un caràcter (A total character) (2000)
- Un home de paraula (A man with a word) (2006)
- La dona veloç (2012)
- La mestra i la Bèstia (2023)

=== Short story and essay collections ===
- Marxem, papà, aquí no ens hi volen. (Go on, daddy, we’re not welcome here)(2004),
- Millor que no m’ho expliquis (Better if you don't tell me) (2003)
- Hi són, però els veus (They are here, but you can't see them)(2003)
- I Was Walking, Barcelona Metropolis, 2010.

=== Children fiction ===
- L'escola Estrambota (The Strambot School) (2005)

== Honours and awards ==
- 1996: "Premi Ribera d'Ebre", Si és no és
- 1997: Tigre Juan Award from the Fundación Alarcos Llorach, for her novel Nunca se sabe
- 1998: "Premi Prudenci Bertrana", Com unes vacances
- 1999: "Premi Cavall verd, de l'Associació d'Escriptors en Llengua Catalana", Com unes vacances
- 2003: "Premio Com Radio", Millor que no m’ho expliquis
- 2004: "Premi Ciutat de Barcelona", Millor que no m’ho expliquis
- 2007: "Premi Maria Àngels Anglada", Un home de paraula
- 2007: "Premi Salambó", Un home de paraula
- 2007: "Premio Internacional Terenci Moix", Un home de paraula
- 2012: "Premi de les Lletres Catalanes Ramon Llull", La dona veloç
- 2013: "Premi El Setè Cel de Salt", La dona veloç
- 2013: "Premi Nacional de Cultura a la trajectòria"
- 2024: "Premi Òmnium a la millor novel·la de l'any", La mestra i la Bèstia

== Bibliography ==
- Imma Monsó: La narrativa de la ironia i diferència. Vic (Barcelona): Eumo & Universitat de Vic, ‘Capsa de Pandora’ Feminist Studies Series. ISBN 978-84-9766-239-0. Author: M. Lunati, Senior Lecturer in Hispanic Studies, Cardiff University, GB:
