= Rafel Nadal =

Spanish journalist and writer

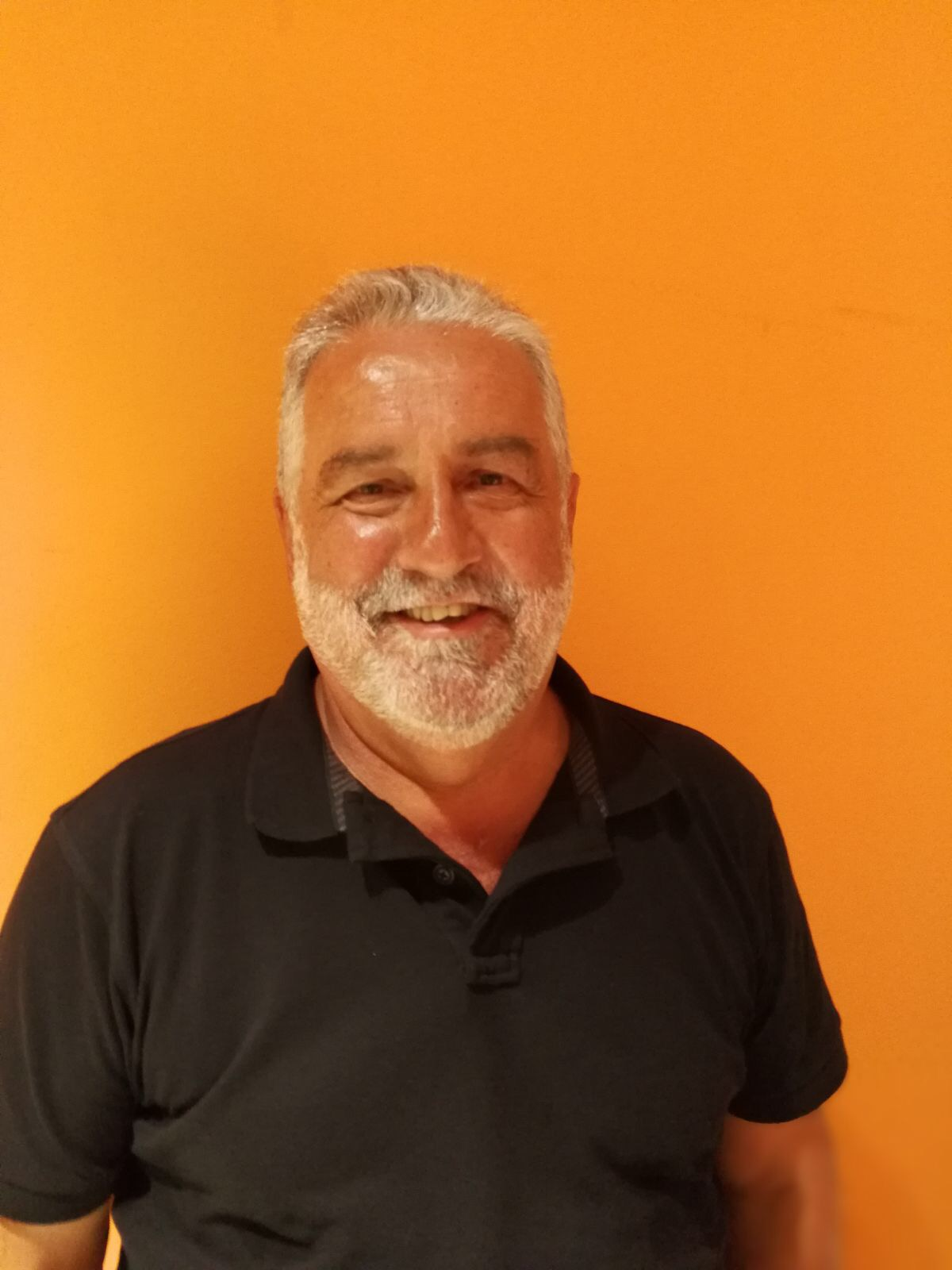
- Born: 2 October 1954 (age 71); Girona
- Occupations: writer and journalist
- Known for: La Maledicció dels Palmisano

Rafel Nadal (born 1954, Girona) is a Spanish journalist and writer. He has published Els Mandarins (Columna, 2011); Quan érem feliços (Destino, 2012); Quan en dèiem xampany (Columna, 2013); La Maledicció dels Palmisano (Columna, 2015), a bestseller published in 22 languages; and La senyora Stendhal (Columna, 2017).

In 2012, he was awarded with Josep Pla Award for Quan érem feliços.

In 2014 he won the Maria Àngels Anglada Prize for Quan en dèiem xampany.

In 2019, he published El fill de l’italià and won the most important prize in Catalan literature, the Ramon Llull Literary Award. As a journalist, he was director of El Periódico de Catalunya between 2006 and 2010.

== Works ==
- Els mandarins (2011, Columna)
- Quan érem feliços (2012, Destino)
- Quan en dèiem xampany (2013, Columna)
- La maledicció dels Palmisano (2015, Columna)
- La senyora Stendhal (2017, Columna)
- El fill de l'italià (2019, Columna)
