= Joan-Lluís Lluís =

Catalan writer

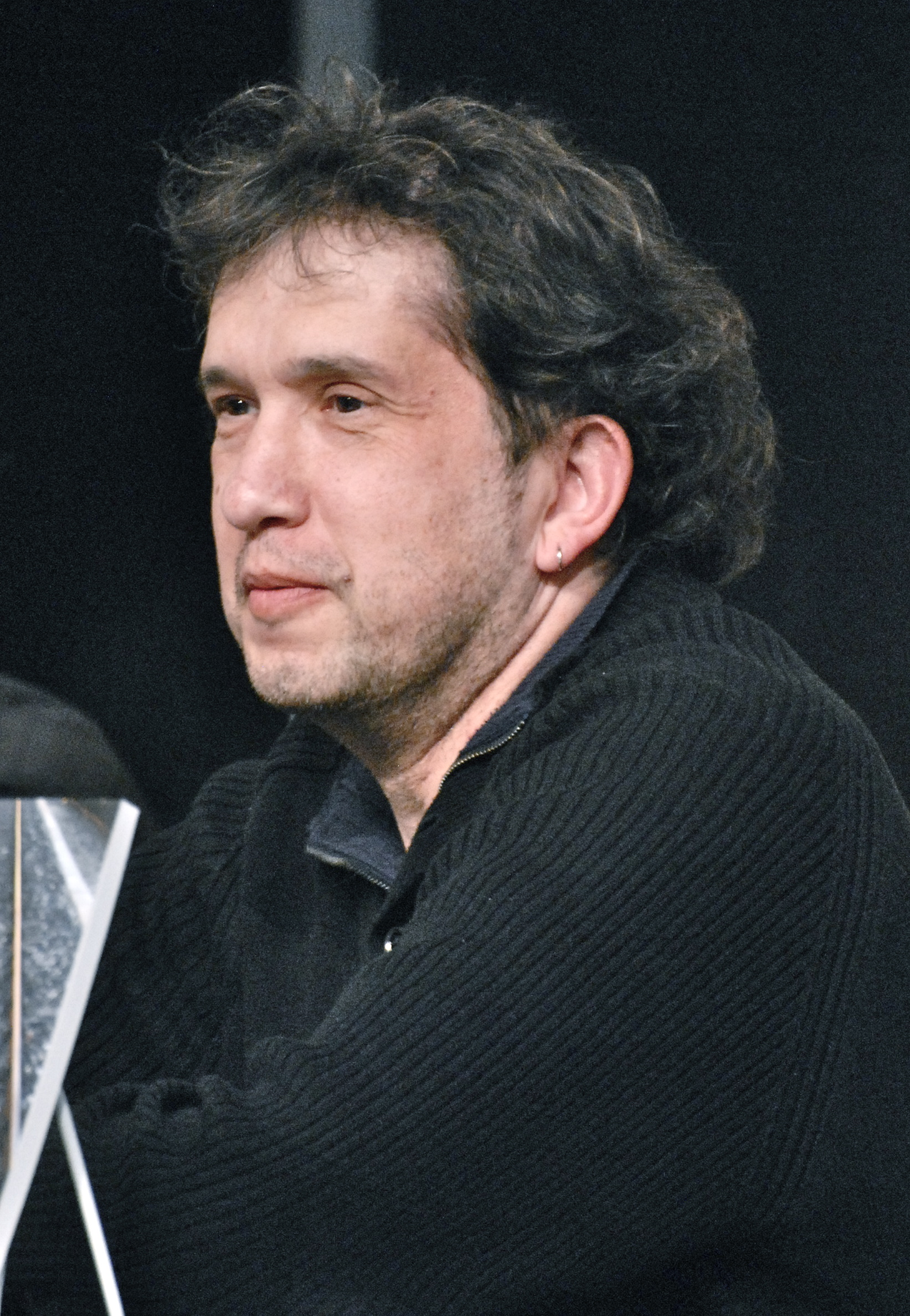
- Born: June 29, 1963 (age 63); Perpignan, France
- Writing career
- Language: Catalan

Joan-Lluís Lluís (Perpignan, 1963) is a Catalan writer. His works include five novels and a collection of essays entitled Conversa amb el meu gos sobre França i els francesos (Conversation with my Dog about France and the French, 2002). This last work, which Lluís himself describes as a pamphlet, focuses on the precarious linguistic situation of the Catalans under French administration.

He is co-author, with musician Pascal Comelade, of a manifesto published in 1998 by linguistic and cultural activists from Northern Catalonia. His 2004 novel El dia de l'ós (The Day of the Bear) won the prestigious Joan Creixells Prize, and his novel Jo soc aquell que va matar Franco (I'm the one who killed Franco) received the Sant Jordi Award and the Maria Àngels Anglada Prize.

== Works ==
- Els ulls de sorra (Eyes of Sand) (La Magrana, Barcelona, 1993, ISBN 84-7410-692-3)
- Vagons robats (Stolen Carriages) (La Magrana, Barcelona, 1995, ISBN 84-7410-860-8)
- Cirera (Cherry) (La Magrana, Barcelona, 1996, ISBN 84-7410-933-7)
- El crim de l'escriptor cansat (The Crime of the Weary Writer) (La Magrana, Barcelona, 1999, ISBN 978-84-8264-254-3)
- Conversa amb el meu gos sobre França i els francesos (Conversation with my Dog about France and the French) (La Magrana, Barcelona, 2002, ISBN 84-8264-412-2). Premi Joan Coromines de la CAL. A collection of essays.
- El dia de l'ós (The Day of the Bear) (ed. de la Magrana, Barcelona, 2004, ISBN 84-7871-199-6). Joan Crexells Prize.
- Pascal Comelade i Arsène Lupin, les proves irrefutables d'una enginyosa mistificació (Mare Nostrum, Perpignan, 2005, ISBN 2-908476-41-X).
- Diccionari dels llocs imaginaris dels Països Catalans (Dictionary of Imaginary Places in the Catalan Countries) (RBA, 2006, ISBN 978-84-7871-430-8)
- Aiguafang (ed. de la Magrana, Barcelona, 2008, ISBN 978-84-9867-255-8). Serra d'Or Prize.
- Xocolata desfeta, exercicis d'espill (ed. de la Magrana, Barcelona, 2010, ISBN 978-84-8264-031-0)
- A cremallengua, elogi de la diversitat lingüística (ed. Viena, Barcelona, 2011, ISBN 978-84-8330-662-8).
- Les cròniques del déu coix (The Lame God's Chronicles) (ed. Proa, Barcelona, 2013, ISBN 978-84-7588-423-3). Lletra d'Or Prize.
- El navegant (ed. Proa, Barcelona, 2016, ISBN 978-84-7588-633-6). Serra d'Or Prize.
- Jo soc aquell que va matar Franco (ed. Proa, Barcelona, 2018, ISBN 978-84-7588-701-2). Sant Jordi Prize.
