= Jordi Cussà =

Catalan poet, writer, and translator (1961–2021)

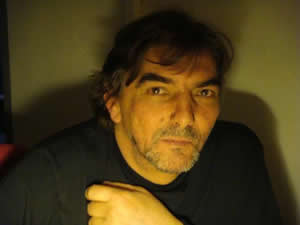
- Jordi Cussà
- Born: Jordi Cussà; 18 January 1961; Berga, Spain
- Died: 11 July 2021 (aged 60)
- Occupations: Writer, translator, playwright
- Writing career
- Language: Catalan
- Genre: Novel
- Notable work: Cavalls salvatges (Wild Horses)

Jordi Cussà (Berga, 18 January 1961 – 11 July 2021) was a Spanish Catalan-language writer.

== Biography ==
In the late 1970s he co-founded the Anònim Theatre foundation in his hometown, Berga, collaborating as a playwright and actor. His first novel Cavalls salvatges (2000) reflects his youth addiction to drugs. The novel was very well received by both public and critics in Catalan cultural scene, 'because of its innovation in both its linguistic and stylistic solutions and its themes'. Afterwards he published other books like La Serp (2001), El Ciclop (2017), A Reveure, Espanya (2010) or El trobador Cuadeferro (2016). His last book was published in 2021: El primer emperador i la reina Lluna.

Member of the Association of Catalan Language Writers, Cussà also worked as a professional translator to Catalan. He published translations from authors like Chuck Palahniuk, John Boyne, Patricia Highsmith and Truman Capote.

== Works ==
- 2000 Cavalls salvatges, Novel, Columna Editors ISBN 84-8300-897-1 (2a edició, revisada, publicada a L'Albí, 2016).
- 2001 La serp, Novel, Columna Editors ISBN 84-664-0038-9
- 2003 SensAles, Poesia, Abadia Editors ISBN 84-933319-5-3
- 2003 L'alfil sacrificat, Novel, Columna Editors ISBN 84-664-0305-1
- 2004 Apocalipsis de butxaca, Novel, Ed. La Magrana ISBN 978-84-7871-217-5
- 2005 La Novel de les ànimes, Novel, Ed. La Magrana ISBN 978-84-7871-431-5
- 2007 Clara i les ombres, Novel, Ed. Empúries. ISBN 978-84-9787-224-9
- 2009 Contes d'onada i de tornada, Relats, l'Albí Editors ISBN 978-84-89751-48-4
- 2009 El noi de Sarajevo, Novel, Proa.
- 2010 A reveure, Espanya, Novel, L'Albí.
- 2012 Contes del Bé i del Mal, Relats, L'Albí Editors. ISBN 978-84-15269-13-7
- 2015 Formentera lady, Novel, Labreu. ISBN 978-84-942897-7-4.
- 2016 El trobador cuadeferro, Novel, L'Albí.
- 2017 El Ciclop, Novel, L'Albí.
- 2021 El primer emperador i la reina Lluna, Novel, Comanegra

As a playwright, he made about fifteen written productions and six premieres: Sòcrates o quasi una tragèdia grega (A.T. La Farsa 1980), Tres vistes per a un paisatge, Exili a Selene, Barcelona 2012, Íntima tragèdia, Godot vas tard (Anònim Theatre 1978, 1991, 1996, 2006 and 2008).

== Awards ==
- 2002 - Premi Fité i Rossell for L'alfil sacrificat
- 2009 - El lector de l'Odissea award for El noi de Sarajevo
