= Llorenç Villalonga i Pons =

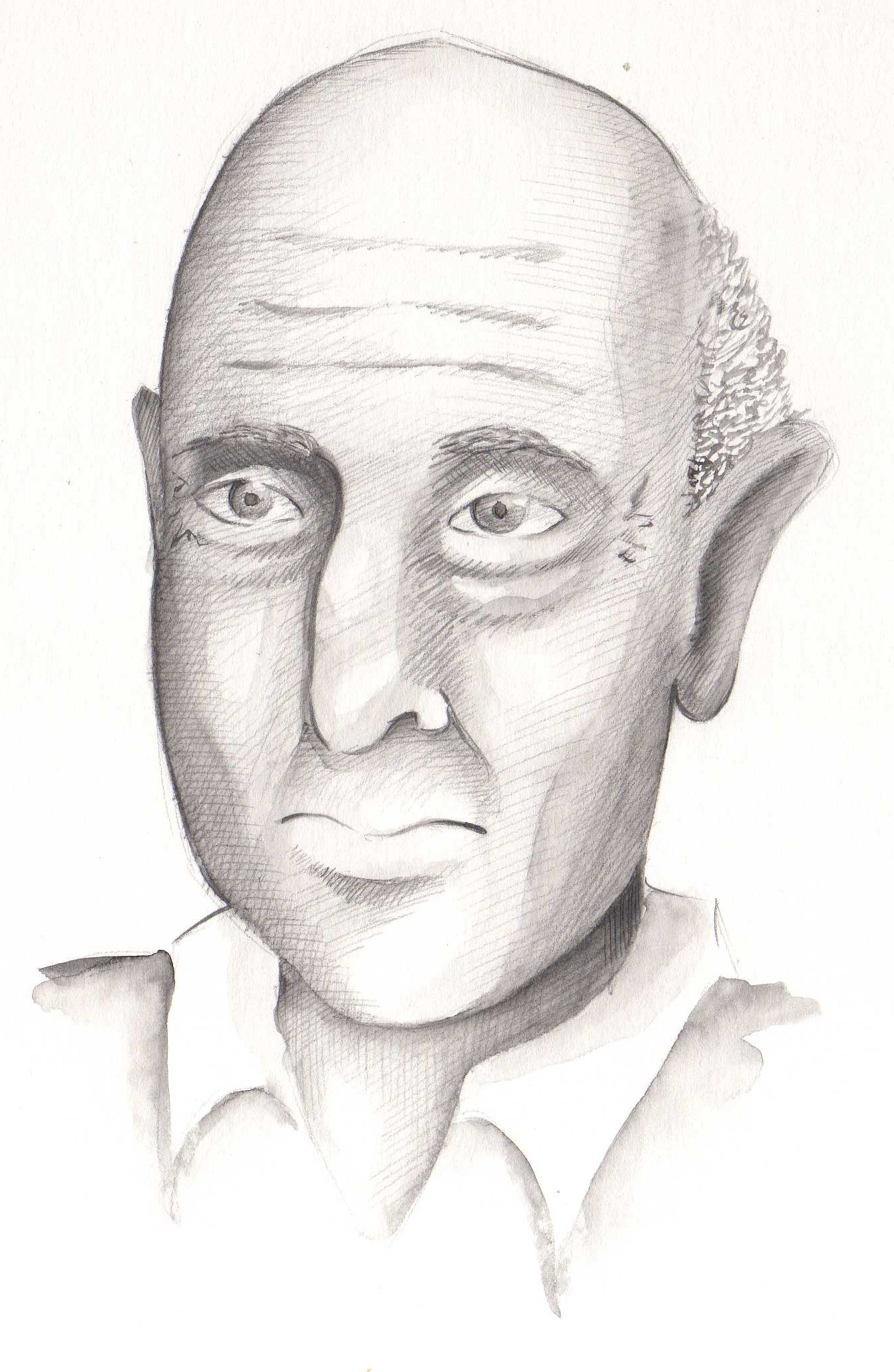
Llorenç Villalonga i Pons.jpg

Llorenç Villalonga i Pons (Palma de Mallorca, March 1, 1897 – January 27, 1980) was a Balearic writer and psychiatrist. While he progressed in his medicine studies, Villalonga traveled to France, Barcelona and Murcia. He gained experience in psychiatry during his stay in France.

Villalonga began his career as a writer publishing his first book, entitled Mort de Dama, which gained a lot of controversy for representing the decline of the rural aristocracy in the Balearic Islands during the 1920s. After the Nationalist's side success in gaining control of Majorca at the start of the Spanish Civil War, he joined the Spanish Falange and adopted anti-Catalan positions by contributing in the destruction of all Catalan cultural associations in Majorca. He also started to write in Spanish.

Some of his novels are L'àngel rebel (1961), Desenllaç a Montlleó (1963), Lulú regina (1970), El misantrop (1972) and Un estiu a Mallorca (1975).

After the end of the war, he changed his political views and progressively joined the Catalan cultural resistance movement. In 1956, he published his most famous novel: Bearn.

During his later years, he published works satirizing the technological society that was in progress in books such as La gran batuda (1968), Flo la Vigne (1974) and Andrea Victrix (1974).
