= Susana Monsó =

Spanish philosopher of animal minds

Susana Monsó is a Spanish philosopher who is based at the National University of Distance Education in Madrid. She is an authority on the philosophy of animal minds, and on animal ethics. She is best known for her writings on comparative thanatology.

Monsó was born in Madrid in 1988. She studied Philosophy at Complutense University of Madrid, then received an MA in Global Ethics and Human Values from King’s College London, where her MA thesis was supervised by Leif Wenar. She wrote her PhD in Philosophy at UNED in Madrid, although it was externally co-supervised by Mark Rowlands at the University of Miami. Monsó's thesis addressed the question of whether animals could be moral agents given their limited understanding of others' minds. It argued that moral agency is possible for creatures who possess empathy, which does not require an understanding of mental states.

Monsó has written extensively on the question of whether animals understand death. Her book on this subject, La zarigüeya de Schrödinger: Cómo viven y entienden la muerte los animales, was published in Spanish in 2021 (Plaza y Valdés). An English version of the book, translated by Monsó and with a new introduction, was published under the title Playing Possum: How Animals Understand Death by Princeton University Press in 2024. Monsó argues that there are good reasons to think that animals possess at least a 'minimal concept of death', grounded in the idea of a permanent loss of function. She argues that those who deny that animals could understand death typically do so because they hold a mistaken, intellectualised conception of what understanding death requires.

Monsó's work has been profiled in the New York Times, The Boston Globe, The Observer, Der Spiegel, Der Zeit, and El País, among others newspapers. In 2024 Playing Possum was featured in books of the year lists published by The Guardian, the New Statesman, and The New Yorker.

== Selected publications ==
- Melis, G. & Monsó, S. (2024): ‘Are humans the only rational animals?’ The Philosophical Quarterly, 74 (3), 844–864.
- Monsó, S. (2024): Playing Possum: How Animals Understand Death (updated and revised translation). Princeton University Press.
- Monsó, S. (2022): ‘How to tell if animals can understand death.’ Erkenntnis, 87, 117–136.
- Monsó, S. (2021): La zarigüeya de Schrödinger: Cómo viven y entienden la muerte los animales. Madrid: Plaza y Valdés.
- Monsó, S. (2017): ‘Morality without mindreading.’ Mind & Language, 32 (3), 338–57.
- Monsó, S. (2015): ‘Empathy and morality in behaviour readers.’ Biology & Philosophy, 30 (5), 671-690.
