= Forest Sciences Centre of Catalonia =

Forest research centre in Solsona, Spain

- Centre de Ciència i Tecnologia Forestal de Catalunya
- Location within Catalonia Forest Sciences Centre of Catalonia (Spain)
- Abbreviation: CTFC
- Formation: 1996
- Headquarters: C. Sant Llorenç, Km2, E-25180 Solsona (Lleida), Spain
- Location(s): Solsona, Girona, Lleida, Tarragona, & Barcelona
- Coordinates: 42.011154°N 1.519379°E
- Region served: Catalonia, Spain
- Director General: Antoni Trasobares
- Affiliations: University of Lleida, GEIE Forespir, European Forest Institute, IUFRO, European Micological Institute, GEIE Forespir
- Budget: 7.892.653 (2015)
- Revenue: 90% public, 10% private, 75% competitive; 25% regional budget
- Staff: 92 (41 researchers) (2015)
- Website: www.ctfc.cat%20www.ctfc.cat

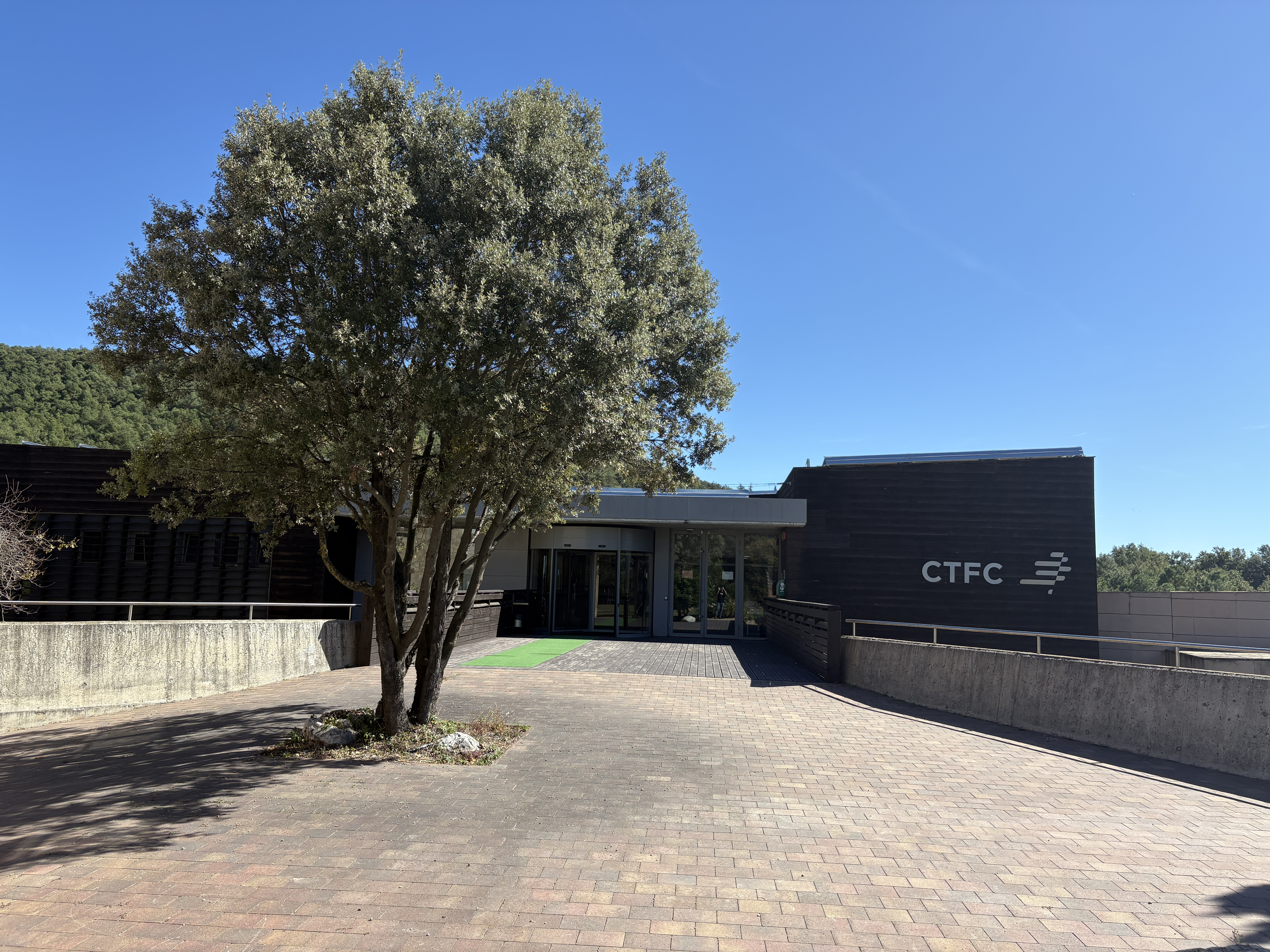
CTFC campus

Forest Sciences and Technology Centre of Catalonia (CTFC) is a centre for forest research headquartered in Solsona, Lleida, and is among the leading applied research centres in Spain. It was founded in 1996 as a consortium of five local and regional institutions (the Consell Comarcal del Solsonès, the University of Lleida, the Diputació de Lleida, the Catalan Foundation for Research and Innovation, and the Catalan Government). The institution has grown to employ over one hundred professionals (including scientists, technicians, fellows and administrative personnel) who work in collaboration with different administrations, institutions and companies, and its annual budget is around 14 million euros.

CTFC is part of the CERCA network of excellence research centre of the Government of Catalonia, in the core of the research ecosystem. It has an external scientific advisory board which makes an independent evaluation every 4 years (2012, 2016), with an obligation to implement its recommendations, and an overarching supervision by the Parliament of Catalonia.
