= Maria Climent i Huguet =

Catalan writer and translator (born 1985)

- Born: 9 January 1985 (age 41); Amposta, Catalonia
- Occupations: Novelist, writer, translator
- Notable work: Gina, A Casa Teníem Un Himne, Mai És Una Paraula Molt Lletja
- Awards: Premi Amposta 2019, El Setè Cel 2020

Maria Climent i Huguet (Amposta, 9 January 1985) is a Catalan novelist, writer and translator. She holds a degree in Translation and Interpretation and has also studied Screenwriting. As well as novel-writing, her professional career has included language teaching, copywriting, social media and content management, and teaching creative writing workshops. Following her participation in a writing workshop with the cultural magazine Catorze, in 2016 she began publishing articles for the magazine on a regular basis.

Her first Catalan language novel, Gina (L'Altra Editorial), was published in 2019. It narrates, with humour and tenderness, the difficulties faced by the protagonist Gina after she is diagnosed with multiple sclerosis, a disease which Maria also suffers from. With Gina, Maria won the Premi Amposta Award in 2019 and the literary prize El Setè Cel (Salt) in October 2020. The Alfaguara publishing house published a Spanish translation of the novel in 2019. It was published in French in 2023 (Éditions des Femmes), Ukrainian in 2024 (Bogdan), Danish in 2025 (Aurora Boreal) and Greek in 2025 by World Books publishing house.

Also in 2019, Maria translated the young adults novel Aristotle and Dante Discover the Secrets of the Universe by Benjamin Alire Sáenz (2012) into Catalan with L’Altra Tribu publishers.

In 2023, Maria published her second novel, A Casa Teníem Un Himne (At home we had an anthem) with the L'Altra Editorial publishers. Dealing with family secrets and the challenges and tragedies of life faced by two daughters and their mother, the book was a finalist for the prestigious Premi Omnium Best Novel 2023 award. A Spanish translation was published in 2024 by Grijalbo, a French translation in 2025 by Éditions des Femmes, and a Brazilian Portuguese translation in 2025 by Olinda/Ímã Editorial. It has also recently been translated into Croatian.

In 2023 a short story by Maria was included in the collection of noir fiction written by modern Catalan female authors, Elles També Negregen (Women also write noir fiction) which was coordinated by Irene Solanich Sanglas.

In 2024 Maria published her first non-fiction book with the Ara Llibres publishing house. Based on her own experience, Mai És Una Paraula Molt Lletja (Never is a very ugly word) deals with the subject of infertility and assisted reproductive treatments. Maria combines reflections on her own struggles to become a mother with facts, statistics and medical information about the different treatments available.

Maria's third novel, Punt De No Retorn (There's no going back), was published in October 2026.

As of 2026, none of her books have been translated into English.

== Publications ==
- Gina (L'Altra Editorial, 2019)
- Aristòtil i Dante descobreixen els secrets de l'univers (L'Altra Tribu, 2019) – translation into Catalan
- A Casa Teníem Un Himne (L'Altra Editorial, 2023)
- Mai És Una Paraula Molt Lletja (Ara Llibres, 2024)
- Punt De No Retorn (L'Altra Editorial, 2026)

== Awards ==
- Premi Amposta Award, 2019
- El Setè Cel Award, 2020
