= Irene Solà =

Catalan writer and artist (born 1990)

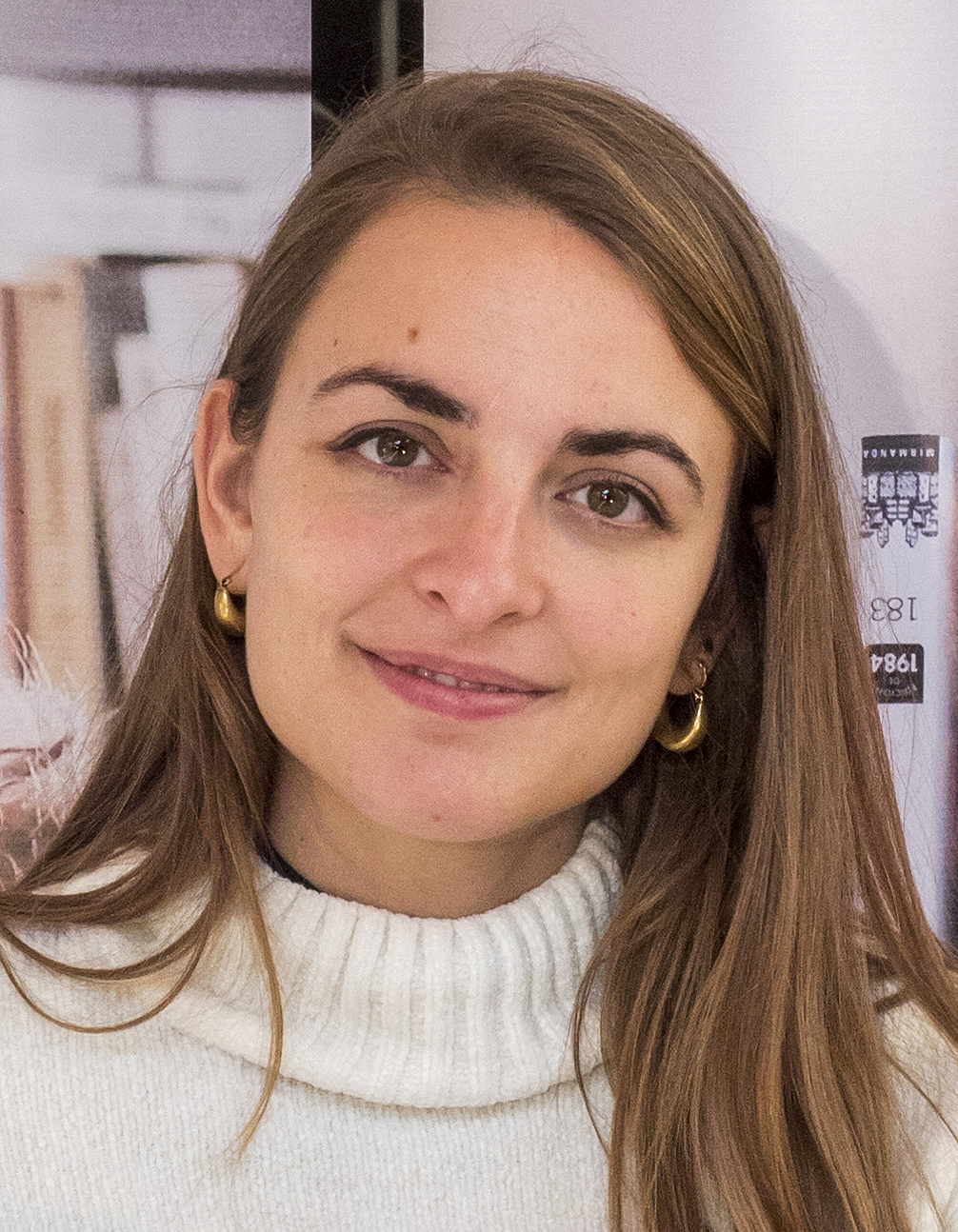
- Born: Irene Solà Sáez; 17 August 1990 (age 36); Malla, Catalonia, Spain
- Education: University of Barcelona; University of Sussex
- Occupations: Writer and poet
- Writing career
- Language: Catalan
- Notable awards: Maria Àngels Anglada Prize; European Union Prize for Literature
- Website: irenesola.hotglue.me

Irene Solà Sáez (born 17 August 1990) is a Catalan writer and artist. She has exhibited her work at the CCCB in Barcelona and the Whitechapel Gallery in London. Her first book of poems, Bèstia won the 2012 Amadeu Oller Prize and her novel Els dics, the 2017 Documenta Prize.

== Career and awards ==
She has a degree in fine arts from the University of Barcelona and a master's in literature, film and visual culture from the University of Sussex. Her first book of poems, Bèstia (Galerada, 2012), was awarded the Amadeu Oller Poetry Prize and has been translated into English (as Beast, Shearsman Books, 2017). Her first novel, Els dics (The Dams, L'Altra Editorial, 2018), won the Documenta prize and was awarded a grant for literary creation by the Catalan Department of Culture. In 2018, she was a resident writer at the Alan Cheuse International Writers Center of George Mason University (Virginia, United States) and in late 2019 she was selected to participate in the Art Omi: Writers Ledig House programme (New York).

In 2019, she was awarded the Premi Llibres Anagrama de Novel·la for Canto jo i la muntanya balla (When I Sing, Mountains Dance). The same year, she also received the Núvol Prize, and the Cálamo Prize for the Spanish edition of the book. In 2020, she won the European Union Prize for Literature and the Maria Àngels Anglada Prize. In 2022 the book was also shortlisted for the Warwick Prize for Women in Translation. In 2023 the book was shortlisted for the Oxford-Weidenfeld Translation Prize. In 2025 was awarded with the Europese Literatuurprijs 2025 for Et vaig donar els ulls i vas mirar les tenebres.

== Works ==
- Canto jo i la muntanya balla (Barcelona: Anagrama, 2019)
  - Canto yo y la montaña baila, Translated by Concha Cardeñoso (Anagrama, 2019)
  - When I Sing, Mountains Dance, Trans. Mara Faye Lethem (Graywolf Press, 2022)
- Els dics (L'Altra Editorial, 2018)
  - Los diques, Trans. Paula Meiss (Anagrama, 2021)
- Bèstia (Galerada, 2012)
  - Bestia, Trans. Unai Velasco (Anagrama, 2022)
  - Beast, Trans. Oscar Holloway (Shearsman Books, 2017)
- Et vaig donar ulls i vas mirar les tenebres (Barcelona: Anagrama, 2023)
  - Te di ojos y miraste las tinieblas, Trans. Concha Cardeñoso (Anagrama, 2023)
  - I Gave You Eyes and You Looked Toward Darkness, Trans. Mara Faye Lethem (Granta Books, 2025)
  - Ik gaf je ogen en je keek in de duisternis, Trans. Adri Boon (Cossee, 2024)
