= Edicions de 1984 =

Edicions de 1984 is an independent publishing house in Catalonia specialized in up-market literature which was founded in 1984 by Josep Cots as an homage to George Orwell. Josep Cots, the current director and editor-in-chief, and his team have been building up the company’s catalogue which includes some of the most important authors of all times. The catalogue, which has around 450 active titles, includes translations of all genres (novel, poetry, theatre and essay) and works by catalan authors. Edicions de 1984 publishes around twenty-five titles per year and it follows an author policy. Among its authors, the catalogue includes foreign authors like Claudio Magris, Saunders, Strout, Jennifer Egan, Davis, Whitman, Chalandon, Binet, Fallada, Döblin, Balzac, Hugo, Grimaldi, Grimal, Giono, Gide, Buzzati, Berger, Leroy, Somerset Maugham, Zola, Ford Madox Ford, Akhmàtova, Pinthus, Zweig, among many others.
