= Joaquim Ruyra =

Catalan writer

Joaquim Ruyra i Oms
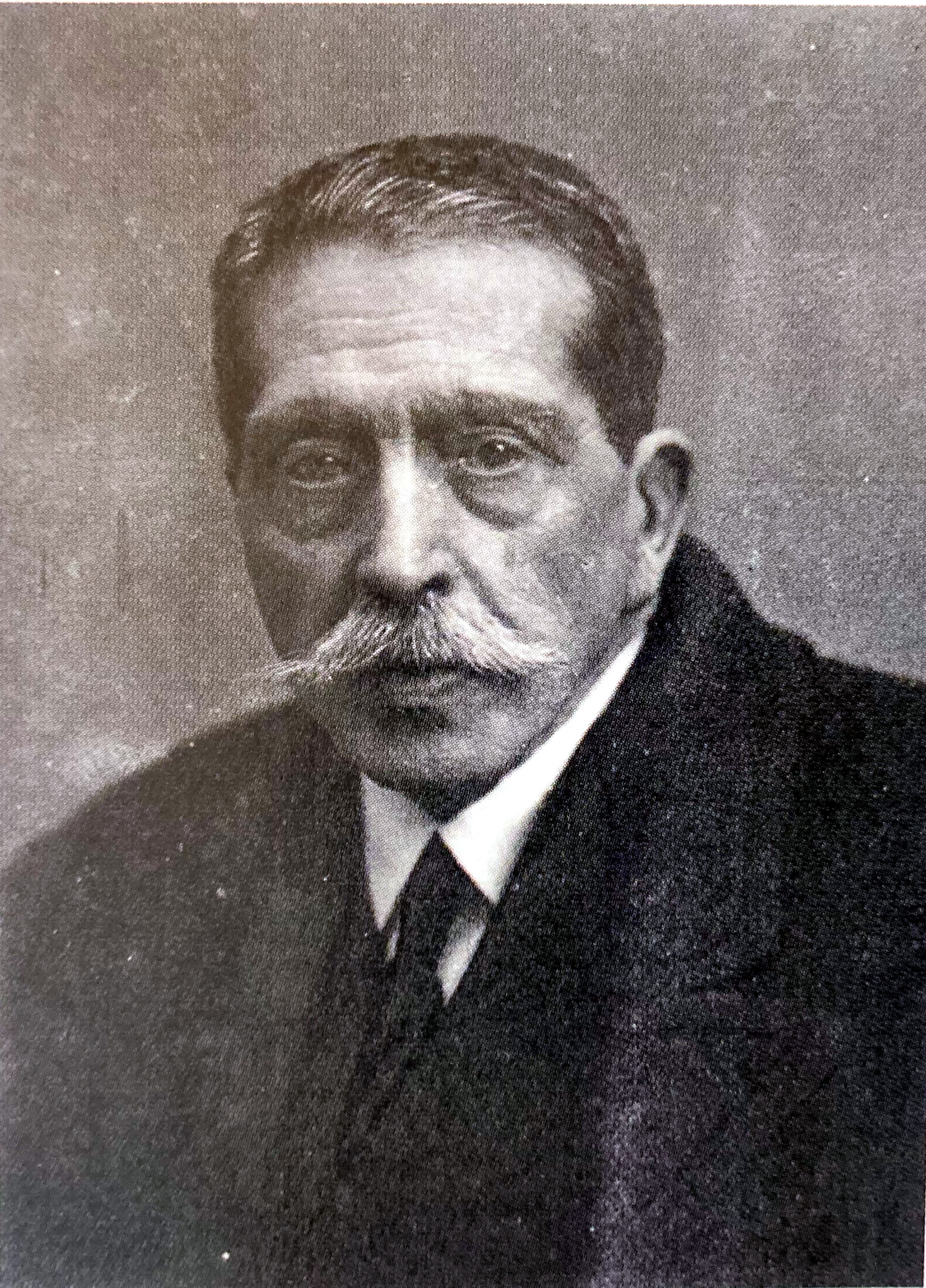
- Born: 27 October 1858; Girona, Catalonia
- Died: 15 May 1939 (aged 80); Barcelona, Catalonia
- Occupations: Writer, poet
- Writing career
- Notable works: Marines i boscatges, Pinya de rosa, La parada

Joaquim Ruyra i Oms (Catalan pronunciation: [ʒuəˈkim ruˈi.ɾə]; 27 September 1858 – 15 May 1939) was a Catalan short-story writer, poet and translator, considered a key figure in modern Catalan literature and one of the great narrators of the 20th century.

Besides his literary work, he was also aware of linguistics and participed in the First International Congress of Catalan Language (1906). In 1918, he entered the Philological Section of the Institut d'Estudis Catalans, the academic institution responsible for standardizing the Catalan language, where he collaborated with Pompeu Fabra and others in the making of a unified linguistic system.

== Life ==
Descending from rural owners and lawyers, he studied law in the University of Barcelona between 1875 and 1881, but never practised to dedicate himself completely to literature. Ruyra spent most of his childhood and youth between Girona and the coastal town of Blanes, in the comarca (county) of la Selva, where he settled after marrying Teresa de Llinàs in 1889, although the couple also had a residence in Barcelona and Arenys de Mar.

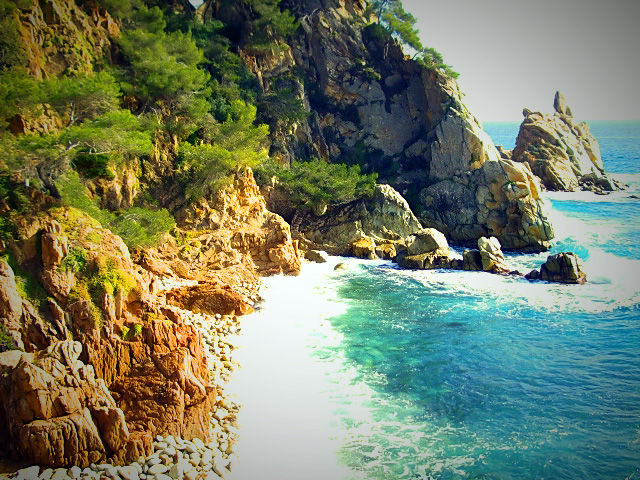
The Costa Brava landscape was a major influence in Ruyra's literary work.

Blanes became the main location of his works and there he came into contact with the local dialect (salat) and the genuine spoken language of fishermen and peasants, that afterwards he incorporated into his writings. In an interview with Tomàs Garcés in 1926, Ruyra said:

Blanes is my history, my homeland, the place for which I have greatest affection. I have lived there almost all my life. I got married there, my parents died there. It is only fair, then, that almost all my memories are of Blanes.

In the summer of 1928, the cork oak forests of his propierty in the Gavarres massif were devastated by a large wildfire. This episode, that affected the wood-and-sea landscape that inspired his major writings, eventually marked the end of his literary career.

During the Spanish Civil War he was first dispossessed of his patrimony and later honoured on his 80th birthday with an official ceremony organized by the Institució de les Lletres Catalanes. He died discreetly in May 1939, in the midst of the war, and was buried in the Blanes municipal cemetery.

== Work ==
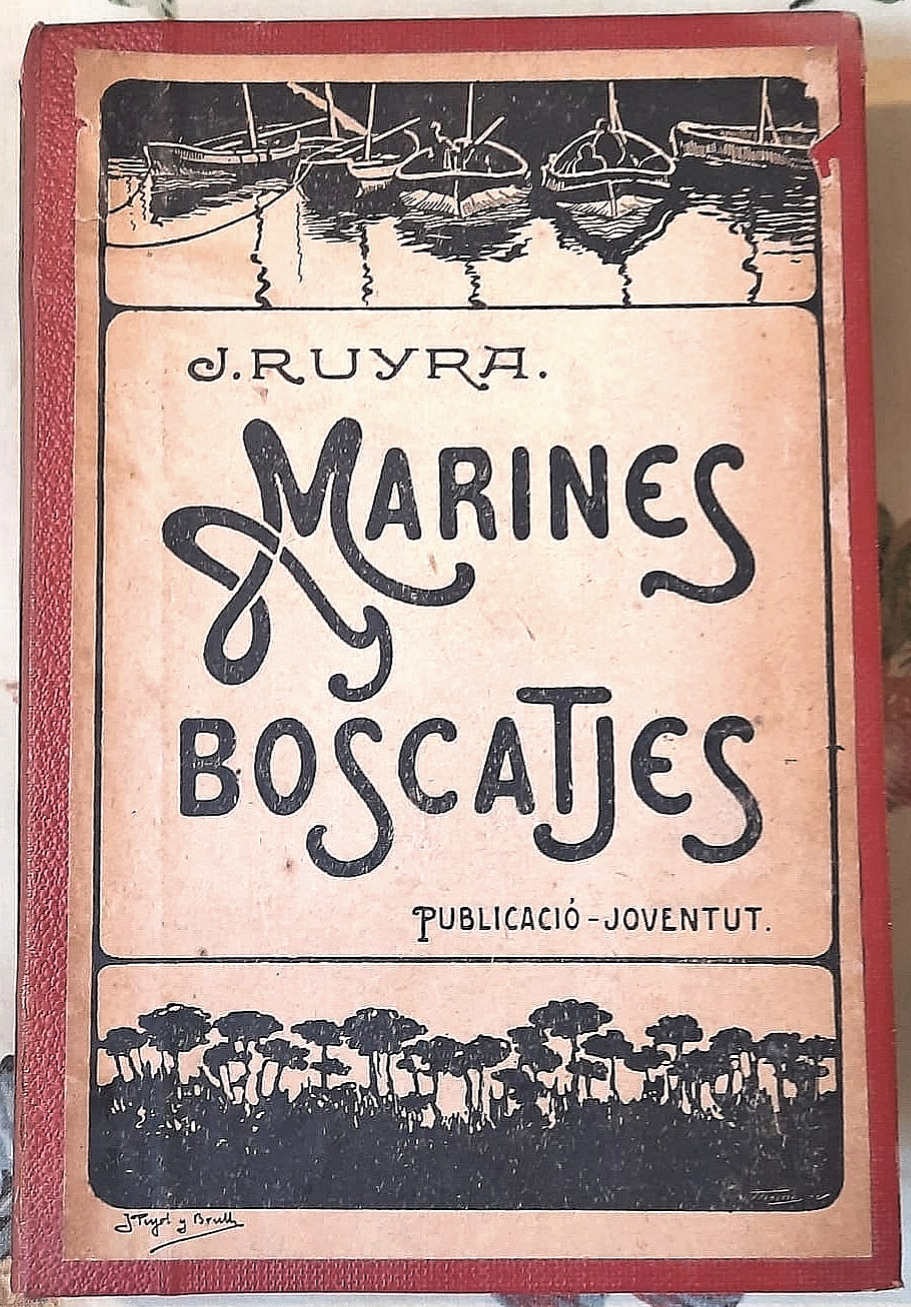
First edition of Marines i boscatges (1903).

Although in his youth he started writing in Spanish, seen at that time as the language for cultural purposes, he soon swifted to his mother tongue influenced by major poet Jacint Verdaguer —whom he met personally— and participated in the literary life of Barcelona, Blanes, Girona and Olot, becoming winner of many Floral Games contests (Jocs florals) in the 1890s–1900s and collaborating in several Catalanist magazines and newspapers (La Renaixença, La Veu de Catalunya, Joventut and others).

Ruyra cultivated many different genres such as narrative, poetry, drama, essay and literary criticism, but he is best known by the short stories included in the volumes Marines i boscatges (Seascapes and Woodland Scenes, 1903), which was some years later extended and republished as Pinya de rosa (The End Knot, 1920), and also La parada (The Trap, 1919). The third volume was Entre flames (Among Flames, 1928), dedicated to those affected by the forest fires in Gavarres, and next year appeared in the press the philosophical narration Sociòlegs d'ultratomba (After-death Sociologists, 1929). Some of these stories have been translated to Spanish, English, French, German and Italian and have been compared with writings by Herman Melville, Joseph Conrad, Edgar Allan Poe, Robert Louis Stevenson, and Ernest Hemingway.

Ruyra wrote three chapters of an unfinished novel (La gent del mas Aulet, 1904), the short novel Les coses benignes (The Benign Things, 1925) and two poetry anthologies, Fulles ventisses (Windy Leaves, 1919) and La cobla (The Cobla, 1931). Moreover, he also translated French writers like Erckmann-Chatrian, Racine, Molière and Eugène Scribe into Catalan.

== Influence ==
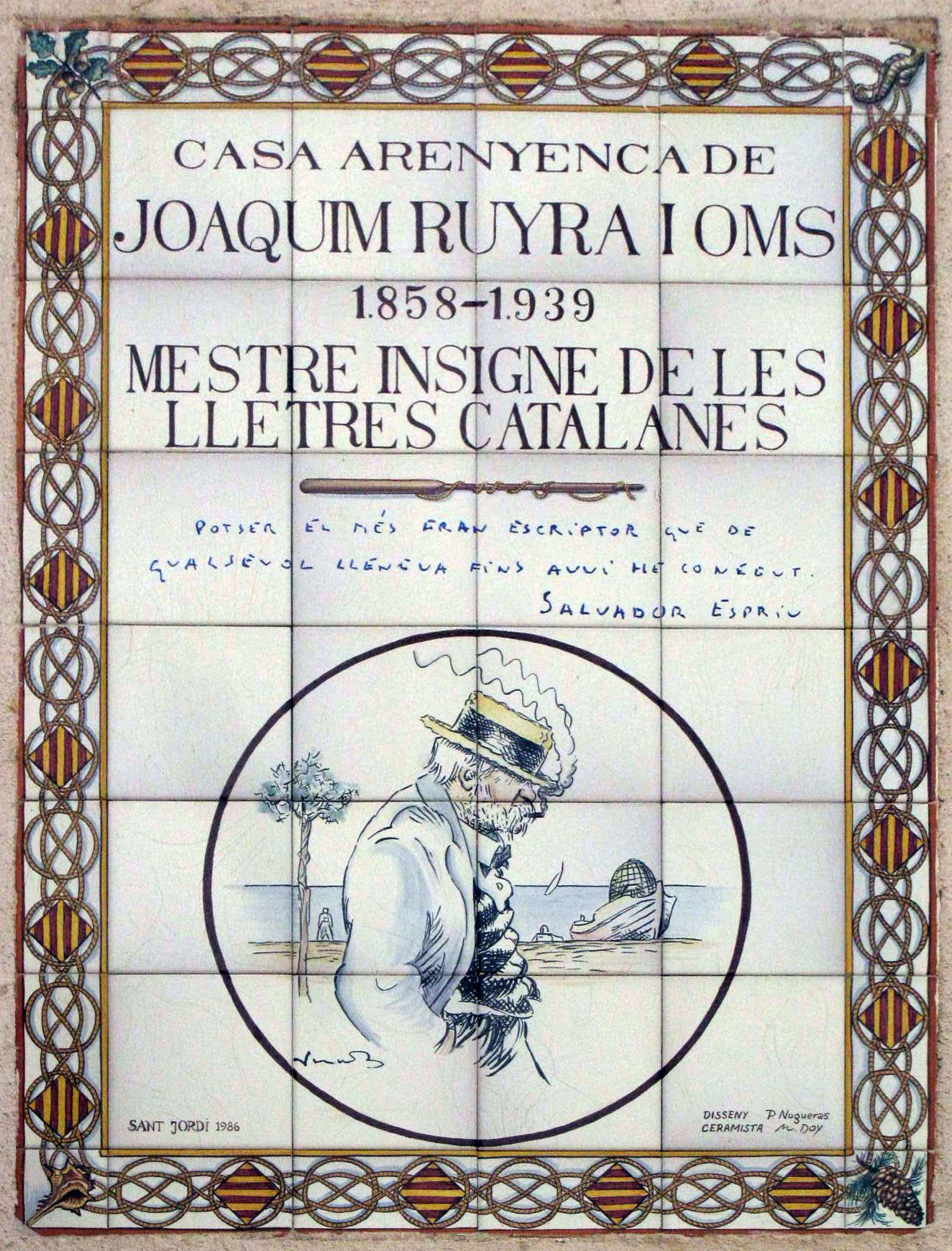
Ceramic plaque on Ruyra's house in Arenys de Mar

Ruyra was in the vanguard of the Catalan Modernist generation as they constructed a new literary model after 1860, when the Catalan language became the vehicle of cultural nationalism. Although he did not produce a large body of work, his short stories set a stylistic benchmark for Catalan literature—including the shaping of a "landscape canon"—and represent a model use of language that strongly influenced many great Catalan writers, including Josep Carner, Carles Riba, Josep Pla, Pere Calders and Mercè Rodoreda. Salvador Espriu even declared himself as his literary disciple and stated that Ruyra was "possibly the greatest writer I have known to date in any language".

Nowadays Ruyra's memory is fondly remembered in his hometown Blanes, where the Town Hall promotes a multilingual literary route that explores different sites that inspired and feature in his short stories, such as the shipyards, the cove of Sa Forcanera or the Sanctuary of El Vilar. In addition, a promenade and a local public school are named after him. In 1958, on the occasion of the centenary of Ruyra's birth, a homage monument was erected in the seafront, and in 1989 a plaque was placed in his family home –known as Can Creus, located on the Main Street– that reads as follows: "Joaquim Ruyra i Oms, devoted son of Blanes and master of Catalan prose". The house where he lived in Arenys de Mar also has a plaque of ceramic in the façade.

Since 1963, the Enciclopèdia Catalana Foundation and La Galera publishing house award the Joaquim Ruyra Prize of young adult fiction during the Nit de Santa Llúcia ("Saint Lucy's Night"), one of the most important cultural events related to Catalan-language literature.
