= Mercè Rodoreda =

Catalan novelist and poet (1908–1983)

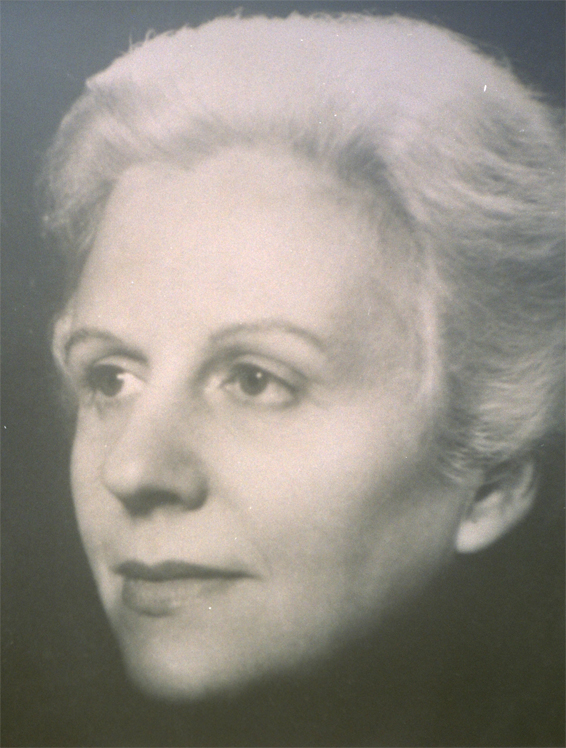
- Mercè Rodoreda
- Born: 10 October 1908; Barcelona, Catalonia, Spain
- Died: 13 April 1983 (aged 74); Girona, Catalonia, Spain
- Resting place: Romanyà de la Selva
- Occupations: Novelist, Dramatist, Poet
- Partner: Armand Obiols
- Writing career
- Language: Catalan
- Notable works: The Time of the Doves, Mirall trencat, Aloma
- Notable awards: Premi d'Honor de les Lletres Catalanes (1980); Premi Joan Crexells de narrativa (1937); Mestre en Gai Saber (1949)
- Website: www.mercerodoreda.cat

Mercè Rodoreda i Gurguí (Catalan pronunciation: [məɾˈsɛ ruðuˈɾɛðə]; 10 October 1908 – 13 April 1983) was a Catalan novelist, who wrote in the Catalan language.

She is considered the most influential contemporary Catalan language writer, as evidenced by other authors' references to her work and her international reputation, with translations into more than thirty languages.

She also has been called the most important Catalan female novelist of the postwar period. Her novel La plaça del diamant ('The diamond square', translated as The Time of the Doves, 1962) has become the most popular Catalan novel to date and has been translated into over 30 languages. Some critics consider it to be one of the best novels published in Spain after the Spanish Civil War.

After her death, another of her artistic talents was discovered, painting, which had remained in the background due to Rodoreda prioritizing writing:

I write because I like to write. If it didn't seem like an exaggeration, I would say that I write to please myself. If others like what I write, the better. Perhaps it is deeper. Perhaps I write to affirm myself. To feel that I am ... And it's over. I have spoken of myself and essential things in my life, with a certain lack of measure. And excess has always scared me.

— Mercè Rodoreda, prologue of Mirall Trencat

== Biography ==
=== Childhood (1908-1921) ===
Mercè Rosa Rodoreda i Gurguí was born on October 10, 1908, at 340 carrer de Balmes, Barcelona Her parents were Andreu Rodoreda, from Terrassa and Montserrat Gurguí, from Maresme. Both were lovers of literature and theatre and had attended recital classes taught by Adrià Gual at the School of Dramatic Art (which would later become the Institute of Theater). Her mother also had an interest in music.

Her parents' financial problems forced her to leave school at age nine. From 1915 to 1917 she attended the Lurdes School in the Sarrià neighborhood, and from 1917 to 1920 she went to the Nuestra Señora de Lourdes centre, which was closest to her home, on Calle de Padua, at the height of the street of Vallirana. Later she went to an academy where she studied only French and business arithmetic.

Her maternal grandfather, Pere Gurguí, was an admirer of Jacint Verdaguer (of whom he had been a friend) and had collaborated as an editor in the magazines La Renaixensa and L'Arc de Sant Martí. In 1910, Pere Gurguí had a monument in memory of Jacint Verdaguer erected in the garden of his house that bore an engraving with the title of the two most important works of the author, Canigó and L'Atlàntida; that place became the space for parties and family gatherings. The figure of her grandfather marked her intensely and she came to consider him her teacher. Gurguí instilled in her a deep Catalan feeling, and a love for the Catalan language and flowers that were well reflected throughout Mercè Rodoreda's work.

I remember the feeling of being at home when, leaning over the railing of the roof, I saw the blue flowers of the jacaranda fall on the grass and the hydrangeas. I will never know how to explain it; I have never felt more at home than when I lived at my grandfather's house with my parents.

— Mercè Rodoreda, Imatges d'infantesa (Images of childhood)

On May 18, 1913, when she was only five years old, she performed for the first time in a play playing the role of the girl Kitty in The Mysterious Jimmy Samson, at the Torrent de les Flors theater. Years later, this character was, recovered for the story The bathroom, within the work Twenty-two stories.

During her childhood she read all the classic and modern Catalan authors, such as Jacint Verdaguer, Ramon Llull, Joan Maragall, Josep Maria de Sagarra and Josep Carner, among others, influenced by the bohemian atmosphere of her family's home.

On May 30, 1920, she participated in the drama Fifteen Days of Reign at Lourdes School. In the same act she also read the poem in Catalan called La negra.

In 1921, her uncle Juan moved in with the family and changed the lifestyle of all its members, imposing austerity and conventional order. She had idealised him as a result of the letters she had previously received and ended up marrying him on October 10, 1928, her twentieth birthday, in the church of Bonanova. He was fourteen years older than her and, due to the degree of consanguinity, they needed a papal dispensation.

=== Youth (1921-1938) ===
After the wedding, the couple went to Paris on a honeymoon, and then they settled in a house on Zaragoza Street. Her husband had gone to Argentina when he was very young and had returned with a small fortune.

On July 23, 1929, their only son, Jordi Gurguí i Rodoreda, was born. From that moment on, Mercè Rodoreda began to do literary tests, to get rid of the economic and social dependency that the monotonous married life gave her. That is how she began to consider writing as a profession. Every day she locked herself for a while in a blue dovecote that was in Manuel Angelon's maternal house, which possibly later served as an inspiration to include the dovecote in The Time of the Doves. During that time, she wrote verses, a theatrical comedy (which remains defunct), and a novel. Meanwhile, the Second Republic was formed.

==== Second Spanish Republic ====
In 1931 she began to take classes at the Dalmau Lyceum, where she improved her knowledge of language under the guidance of the pedagogue, linguist and esperantist Delfí Dalmau i Enero, who greatly influenced her and encouraged her to train, and with whom a bond of friendship developed. Rodoreda showed Dalmau what she wrote and he encouraged her to make these first texts public. According to Dalmau, Mercè Rodoreda was an exceptional student, possessing spiritual fulfillment and a promising literary soul. This admiration led Dalmau to ask her to be one of the counterparts in her work Polémica, An Apology for Catalan and Esperanto; she answered affirmatively and the piece was published in 1934. As Dalmau recognized, this work had also been influenced by Rodoreda's observations.

In 1932, Rodoreda wrote her first novel, titled Am I an honored woman?, and also some stories for various newspapers. The work went almost unnoticed until it was nominated for the Crexells Prize in 1933, although the winner that year was Carles Soldevila. She also published an interview with the actress Maria Vila in the Mirador magazine on October 20th of that year.

On October 1, 1933, she began her journalistic career in the weekly magazine Clarisme where she published twenty-two contributions: five prose on traditional culture, thirteen interviews, two reviews, a short story, and three comments on political, musical and film themes. That same year, she joined the Barcelona Press Association, evidence of her intention to formalize collaboration with journalistic work.

In the spring of 1934 she published her second work, What cannot be escaped, in the editions of the magazine Clarisme. In May of that same year, she won the Independent Casino Award of the Floral Games of Lleida with the story "The little mermaid and the dolphin", which is currently lost.

After writing that second work, Joan Puig i Ferreter, director of Ediciones Proa, visited her and was interested in publishing her next work: A day in the life of a man, which was published in the autumn of that same year in Proa. Rodoreda began to enter the literary world thanks to the help of Puig i Ferreter himself, who opened the doors of El Club de los Novelistas, made up of authors such as Armand Obiols, Francesc Trabal or Joan Oliver, who were also former members of The Sabadell Group. At that time, she began to read the novels of Fyodor Dostoevsky.

From 1935 to 1939, she published a total of sixteen stories for children in the newspaper La Publicidad, in a section called A while with children. Noteworthy works include The Boy and The House, dedicated to her son, and The Sheet, which she dedicated to Josep Carner. In addition, she combined it with the publication of stories in the leading Catalan press media such as La Revista, La Veu de Catalunya and Mirador, among others.

In 1936 she published her fourth novel, Crim. Later, Rodoreda rejected this novel, along with the previous three, considering them the product of inexperience.

==== Spanish Civil War ====
From 1937 until that moment, Rodoreda held the position of Catalan language corrector in the Generalitat's Propaganda Commissariat. In this place she met writers of that time such as Aurora Bertrana, Maria Teresa Vernet, and also established a friendship with Susina Amat, Julieta Franquesa, Anna Murià and Carmen Manrubia.

She was awarded the 1937 Joan Crexells Prize for her work Aloma. That same year, she separated from her husband Joan Gurguí, after nine years of marriage and with one child. Her alleged lover, Andreu Nin, was arrested on June 16 in front of his party's headquarters on La Rambla in Barcelona, where days later he was tortured and killed by Soviet police officers on the orders of General Alexander Orlov, in the prison of Alcalá de Henares.

In 1938, the fifth novel by Mercè Rodoreda titled Aloma was published by the Institute of Catalan Letters. This was the first work that Rodoreda accepted as hers, although later she rewrote and published it again. The same year, on behalf of the PEN Club of Catalonia, she traveled together with the Catalan writer Francesc Trabal, and read a welcome written by Carles Riba at the international congress of the PEN club in Prague.

=== Exile (1938-1972) ===
On January 23, 1939, a few months before the defeat of the Republicans, she fled into exile. Thinking that the separation would be brief, she left her son with her mother. Although she had never participated in politics, she left on the advice of her mother, who feared problems due to collaborative activities with Catalan publications and some left-wing magazines in previous years. Along with other intellectuals of the time, she went from Barcelona to Gerona with a bookmobile owned by the Ministry of Culture of the Generalitat of Catalonia. She then followed the path through Mas Perxés, in the municipality of Agullana, until she crossed the administrative border by Le Perthus and entered Northern Catalonia on January 30. After spending the night in Le Boulou, they went to Perpignan; where they spent three days and then traveled to Toulouse by train.

The war was over, and we had to leave Spain. Me, not for nothing, because I had never been in politics, but the fact of having written in Catalan, and for having collaborated in magazines, let's say on the left, etcetera, etcetera. And advised by my mother, because I left thinking that after three, four or five months I would return home, but then it became eternal.

— Mercè Rodoreda in the interview A fondo (1981)

==== Roissy-en-Brie ====
She arrived in the French capital at the end of February and in early April she moved to Roissy-en-Brie, a town near the east of the capital. She settled in the Château de Roissy, a 17th-century building, which was offered as a refuge for writers. She shared a home for a few months with other intellectuals such as Anna Murià, César Augusto Jordana, Armand Obiols, Francesc Trabal and Carles Riba.

In Roissy-en-Brie several love affairs arose; one of them was between Mercè Rodoreda and Armand Obiols. The problems in the château arose because Armand Obiols was married to Francesc Trabal's sister and they had a son, who had remained in Barcelona with his mother. Furthermore, Armand Obiols' mother-in-law had traveled with Trabal to Roissy-en-Brie along with other members of the Trabal family. Consequently, this affair divided the Catalan exiles into two opposing camps. According to Anna Murià, Francesc Trabal was opposed not only by his sister but by jealousy, since he would have had a secret relationship with Mercè Rodoreda in Barcelona that only the two of them and their confidante knew. Rodoreda wanted to write a book about it called The Roissy novel, however, she never decided to do it.

The atmosphere of stability offered by the château was disturbed by the start of World War II. At that time, some decided to flee to Latin American countries while others, including Rodoreda and Obiols, preferred to stay in France. Later they moved to the Villa Rosset house, on the outskirts of the city.

==== Escaping from the Nazi troops ====
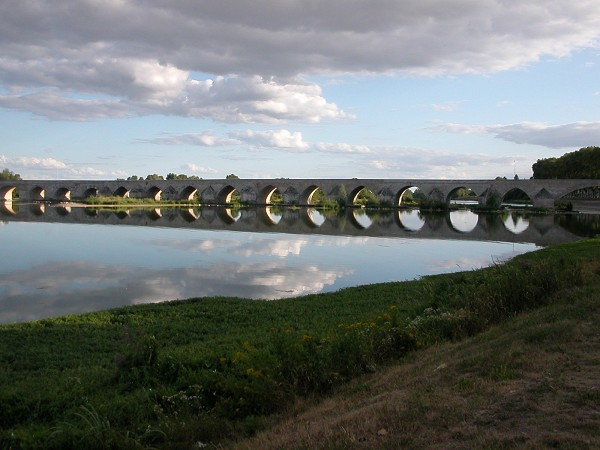
The Beaugency bridge, where Rodoreda crossed the Loire River.

Mercè Rodoreda, along with other writers who were still taking refuge in France, had to flee from Paris in mid-June 1940 due to the advance of the German army going in the direction of Orléans by way of Artenay. Josep Maria Esverd was able to get a truck to flee France; however, the next day the truck was requisitioned by French troops. After an unsuccessful attempt to catch a train, they had to flee south on foot. The objective was to cross the Loire River to enter the unoccupied area, but shortly before reaching Orléans they found it on on fire and there was no bridge left on that stretch of the Loire River; consequently, they deviated from the fixed route.

So we started the retreat on foot for three weeks. We spent about three weeks fleeing from the Nazis and walking on French roads [...] We passed over a bridge to Beaugency, which was being mined by French gunners. It was an afternoon with a very dark and very low sky. The Germans began to bombard the bridge with scary stukes; and you could see the bombs falling and exploding nearby. [...] There were dead people on the bridge. Something terrible! So, we headed to Orleans, thinking we could rest there for a day or two, but when we got to see Orleans ... Orleans was on fire, because it had just been bombed. It was then that we slept in a country house that smelled of bad meat and sour wine, because it was evident that many people had passed by that house; and we slept there all night watching from the windows how Orleans burned.

— Mercè Rodoreda in the interview A fondo (1981)

For twelve days they were sheltered in a farm until the signing of the armistice of 22 June 1940, after which they crossed the Loire River through the town of Meung-sur-Loire, which was completely destroyed. From there they traveled even further south, this time settling in Limoges.

==== Limoges-Bordeaux ====
In Limoges, she settled in a room at 12 Hijas-Notre-Dame street. These were difficult times for Rodoreda, because on June 5, 1941, her partner Armand Obiols was arrested, and she was left alone until October of that year. During that time Armand Obiols had to do forced labor in Saillat-sur-Vienne in a quarry. However, several efforts by Rodoreda got him to be sent to Bordeaux. When Obiols was already in better living conditions in Bordeaux, Rodoreda became involved in a study circle dedicated to reading and learning the English language.

During the following months, the relationship between Mercè Rodoreda and Armand Obiols was mostly at a distance, and only sporadically could they see each other in person. It was not until the end of August 1943 that Rodoreda moved to number 43 Chauffours street in Bordeaux where she was reunited with her lover. In Bordeaux she lived very hard times and, in her words, she sewed "until dirty" in a warehouse for much of the day, a job that did not leave her time to write.

I have made blouses for nine French people and I have been very hungry. I have met very interesting people and the coat I am wearing was inherited from a Russian Jewish woman who committed suicide with Veronal. In Limoges they kept an ovary of mine but what I will not leave in France will be neither my energy nor my youth, until I am fifty I intend to preserve a certain refined genre [...] And, above all, I want to write, I need to write; nothing has given me so much pleasure since I was in the world, as a freshly edited book of mine smelling of fresh ink. I'm sorry I didn't come with you, I would have felt more accompanied, I would have worked, all these useless, demoralizing years weigh on me, but I will take revenge. I will make them useful, stimulating my enemies to tremble. On the slightest occasion I will do a Sicilian horse entry again. There will be no one to stop me.

— Mercè Rodoreda, excerpt from the letter to Anna Murià (Bordeaux, December 19, 1945)

==== Paris ====
The return to Paris took place in September 1946 when Rodoreda and Obiols moved to the house of Rafael Tasis in exile, located at number 9 Coëtlogon street. A short time later, the couple moved to the sixth floor of number 21 on Cherche-Midi street, in the residential area of Saint-Germain-des-Prés, which was a meeting place for many intellectuals of the time. This was her home for eight years and, in fact, she did not fully disengage until 1977.

At the beginning of 1947, she left her job as a seamstress to go back to work as a collaborator in the magazine Revista de Catalunya. Apart from publishing narrations during that year in the various editions of the magazine, she was also able to publish some in Chile and Mexico.

From 1947 to 1953, Mercè Rodoreda was unable to cultivate extensive literature because in 1945 she had begun to suffer from health problems, along with the reappearance of somatic paralysis in her right arm. For this reason, she intensified her poetic creation and found her teacher in Josep Carner, with whom she maintained a close relationship by correspondence. In 1952, she began recovery therapy at the Châtel-Guyon spa. During the years that she was in Paris, she also began two novels that she did not finish.

In 1947, during the Floral Games of the Catalan Language held in London, she won her first Natural Flower with six sonnets: Rosa, Amor novell, Adam a Eva, Ocell and two more untitled sonnets. With the poem Món d'Ulisses, Rodoreda won for the second time the Natural Flower of the Floral Games of 1948 in Paris, a poem that was published in the magazine La Nostra Revista that same year. Albes i nits gave her the third victory in the Floral Games contest and, consequently, she was named "Mestre en Gai Saber" in Montevideo in 1949. That same year she visited Barcelona for the first time after exile.

In 1951, she also approached painting, interested above all in painters such as Pablo Picasso, Paul Klee and Joan Miró, and she made some of her own creations. In a 1954 letter to Armand Obiols she explains that she already had a "style and a world" in painting, yet she acknowledged that her place was in writing. On the other hand, Obiolsbegan to work as a translator for UNESCO thanks to Quiroga Plá, and two years later, in 1953, he permanently moved to Geneva.

==== Geneva ====
In 1954, Rodoreda and Obiols moved into an apartment at 19 Violet street, in a bourgeois neighborhood in the city of Geneva. In this city, she always felt exiled and even recognized that Geneva "is a very boring city, suitable for writing". Shortly after, Obiols had to move to Vienna for work reasons. That same year, Rodoreda made a trip to Barcelona to attend the wedding of her son, Jordi Gurguí i Rodoreda.

I live in a very nice studio, above a park, with a seven-story house in front of it, but quite far away. On the one hand a piece of lake, and on the other, the Salève. From my terrace, you can see a pretty ugly mountain, because it has many bold spots and it looks like it was sick. When the day is clear, I see the top of Mont Blanc.

— Mercè Rodoreda, interview by Baltasar Porcel to Mercè Rodoreda (1972)

In 1956, she won the Joan Maragall Essay Prize with Three Sonnets and a Song that was published in the literary supplement La Gaceta de Letras de La Nova Revista (1955-1958). Likewise, for her story Carnaval she was awarded the Joan Santamaria Prize in Barcelona that same year.

In 1958 the book of short stories written under the name of Twenty-two short stories was published which, a year earlier, had received the prestigious Victor Català Prize. Some of these stories had already been published in Mexico during her exile in France, while others were unpublished. As the author confessed, this book came from a technical crisis that led to an unequal literary level among the various stories, although they were tied by a thematic unit.

According to some unpublished annotations that spoke of Geneva, during those years Rodoreda saw writers such as Eugeni Xammar, Julio Cortázar and his wife, and Jorge Semprún.

During her long stay in Geneva, she created a garden that she would later replicate in Romanyà de la Selva. The many flowers that surrounded her served as inspiration to portray the flowers that would end up making up Real Flowers within Viatges i Flors, along with the trips that she would write in Romanyà; however, this book was not published until 1980.

La Perla del Lago was the title of a potential novel by the author that remained incomplete, and was kept in the archives of the Institute of Catalan Studies. The title is the name of a restaurant on the shore of Lake Geneva in a corner of Geneva that she frequented. It was a location near the United Nations building where the author regularly ate, and from where she had a great view in the dining room on the upper floors. As described in the prologue of Broken Mirror, the eyes of the protagonist Teresa Goday de Valldaura were the same as the lady of Lemán.

In 1958, she submitted Una mica d'història (A bit of history) for the Joanot Martorell Prize. She did not win but Ricard Salvat did with "Animals destroying laws." The novel was published in 1967 under the title Garden by the Sea. She also wrote the short story Ron Negrita for the volume "The 7 Deadly Sins Seen by 21 Storytellers", although it would later become part of the volume "It looked like silk and other stories". From 1958 onwards, and without breaking up with Rodoreda, Obiols maintained a relationship with a woman in Geneva until his death.

In 1959, Rodoreda began to write the novel that was possibly the best of her career The Time of the Doves (Colometa), published in 1962 as La plaça del Diamant for El Club de los Novelistas. In 1960, she submitted the novel to the Premi Sant Jordi de novel·la, previously known as the Joanot Martorell Prize. She did not win, but her novel Vivir es no facil (Living is not easy) won the Enric Massó y Urgellès prize. Joan Fuster also sent her to 'The Novelists Club', which at that time was run by Joan Sales. Sales was delighted by the novel and started a correspondence with Rodoreda. From that moment, she found in the Editor Club a space where she could pour her literary work, where Salas was a co-founder. When it was published in 1962, the novel was not exactly the one that had been presented for the Sant Jordi prize, but it had received an extension both in chapters and in corrections by Salas, Obiols and the author herself.

Explaining the genesis of La Plaza del Diamante might be interesting, but is it possible to explain how a novel is formed, what impulses provoke it, how strong a will does it make it continue, that what has been done has to end with a struggle? Started easily? Would it be enough to say that I was thinking of it in Geneva looking at the Salève mountain or walking through La Perla del Lago? [...] I wrote it feverishly, as if every working day was the last of my life. I worked blinded; I would correct what I had written in the morning in the afternoon, ensuring that, despite the rush with which I was writing, the horse would not run out of control, holding the reins well so that it did not deviate from the path. [...] It was a time of great nervous tension, which left me half ill.

— Mercè Rodoreda, prologue to La plaça del Diamant (26th edition)

In 1961, she sent another work to the same award, Death in Spring, which did not win either. Rather, Josep Maria Espinàs's The Last Landing was victorious.

In 1965, Rodoreda took the first steps in the publication of her Complete Works after a request from Joaquim Molas, however they would not be published in Ediciones 62 until 1977. The work did not include any of her first four works (I am an honest woman?, What cannot escape, A day in the life of a man and Crime) because she considered them the result of her inexperience. She agreed to rewrite Aloma to adapt it to the level of her current work, it was reissued in 1969.

In 1966, her mother, Montserrat Gurguí, died; and three years later her uncle-husband, Joan Gurguí, also passed. As a result of the death of her husband, the relationship between mother and son was strained due to problems with the distribution of the inheritance. Also in 1966, La calle de las Camelias was published and received the Sant Jordi Prize without her having submitted a candidacy. This fact was used for the direction to decide to award a work already published. With this same novel she also received the Serra d'Or Critical Prize for Literature and Essay in 1967, and the Ramon Llull Novel Award in 1969. In 1967, she began working on the novel Broken Mirror, which years later would become one of the most successful works of the author. Broken mirror was the result of the reworking of the play A day that had not been able to premiere. She also published two works: Garden by the Sea and a collection of stories entitled My Cristina and other stories.

From 1970 onwards, her work began to be translated into other languages, though her first translated work was La Plaza del Diamante in Spanish in 1965. In 1971, her feeling of exile was accentuated with the death of her companion of many years, Armand Obiols, at the Vienna University Hospital. This fact, together with the discovery of another Obiols lover, left her even more alone and broken in Switzerland. During those days, she wrote a shocking little card about the hard days she spent in the hospital; currently, this card is kept in the archives of the IEC. Consequently, after reuniting with some friends from the time of the Civil War, she decided to settle in 1972 in Carmen Manrubia's chalet in Romanyà de la Selva, without ceasing to reside in Geneva, albeit more and more sporadically.

=== Romanyà de la Selva (1972-1983) ===
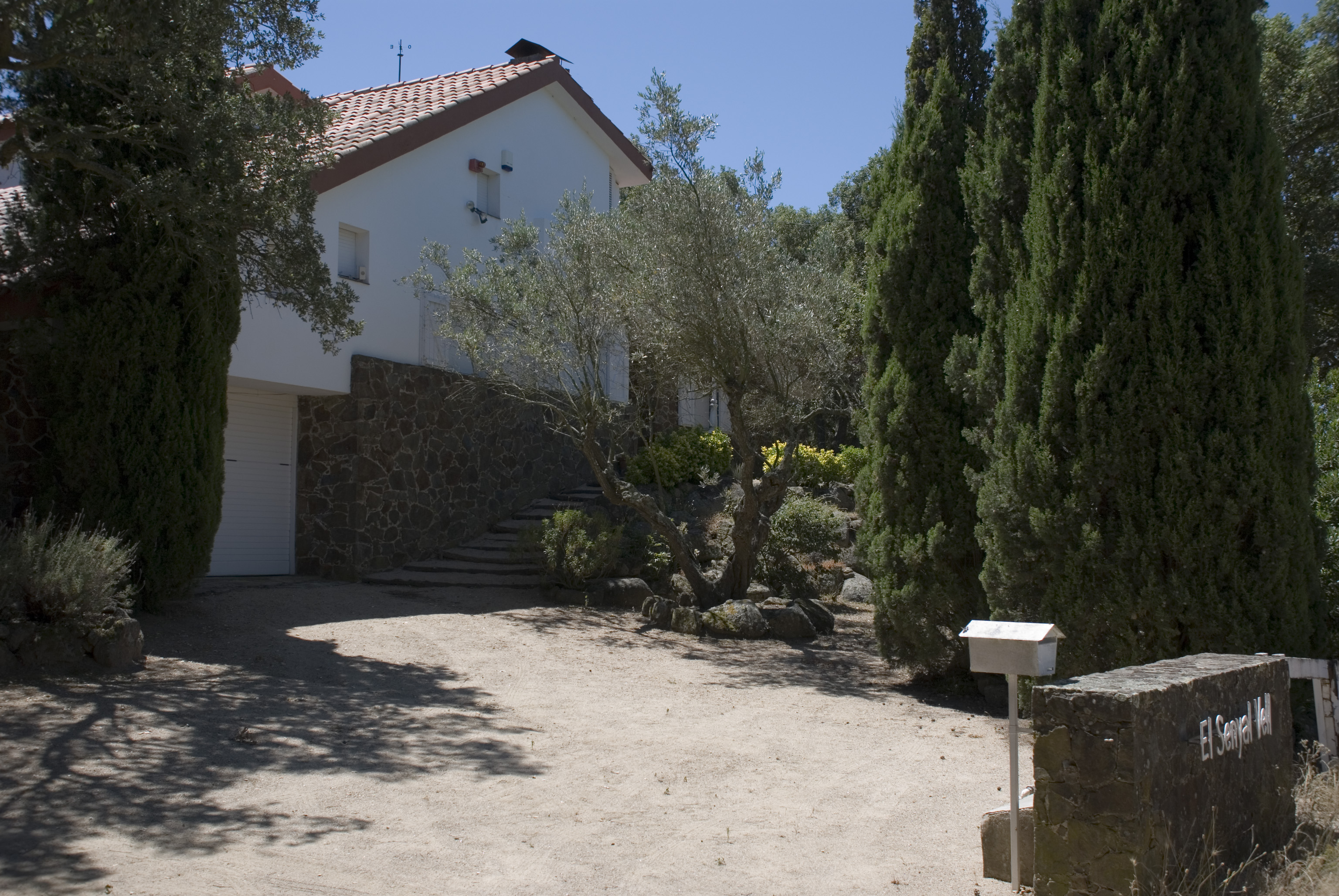
El senyal vell

In 1972, she spent the summer in La Senyal - currently called La Senyal Vell - in Romanyà de la Selva, which was a house owned by her friend Carmen Manrubia, however it had been designed by both of them. Her friendship with Carmen Manrubia existed since when they worked together in the Propaganda Commissariat of the Generalitat of Catalonia during the Spanish Civil War, although they became estranged when Manrubio and Rodoreda went into exile in different countries. Also participating in this project were Carmen Manrubia's adopted son, Carlos, Susina Amat and Esther Floricourt. She lived in this house for six years, until in 1979 she built her own house in Romanyà. The name chosen by the two friends for the house, La senyal, refers to the stigma of Cain in the work Demian by Hermann Hesse.

At Manrubio's house she substantially completed the writing work for Broken Mirror that had already begun in Geneva years before. This work is considered the most successful of her literary production and was published in 1974. She also wrote there Trips to various towns within Trips and flowers and the novel War, So Much War These two books were published in 1980 and with these she won the City of Barcelona Award. That same year, she also went to Barcelona to make the proclamation of the Festes de la Mercè. Also in that same year, she was awarded the Catalan Literary Lifetime Achievement Award for her literary career in the Catalan language, thus achieving her consecration as a writer. In 1978, Semblava de seda i altres contes ("It looked like silk and other stories") was published, which was a compilation of stories written throughout her life.

The joint project between Mercè Rodoreda and Manrubio failed. Mercè Rodoreda bought a piece of land in 1977 in which she had a house built next to the existing one; which would be finished in 1979. According to Anna Maria Saludes and Amat, this abandonment of the Manrubio house was given by Rodoreda's need to follow a life in solitude typical of her character; fruit of the difficult coexistence between the two.

In 1979, she wrote her theatrical comedy El Maniquí, which was premiered in the same year by the Brujas de Dol company at the Sitges International Theater Festival directed by Aracelli Bruch.

In those last years of her life, Mercè Rodoreda saw her novels several times on the small and big screen. First, her novel Aloma, directed by Lluís Pascual, made the leap to television in 1978. In 1982, La plaça del Diamant was adapted to film with Silvia Munt in the role of Colometa and directed by Francesc Betriu.

In 1982, she wrote a compilation of biographical articles published in Serra d'Or titled Childhood Files. Mercè Rodoreda belonged to the Catalan Language Writers Association and was a member and honorary member after her return.

During the last period of her life, her works developed from her usual psychologic style to become more akin to symbolism in its more cryptic form.

In 1998, a literature prize was instituted in her name: the Mercè Rodoreda Award for short stories and narratives.

She was made a Member of Honour of the Associació d'Escriptors en Llengua Catalana, the Association of Writers in Catalan Language. The library in Platja d'Aro is named in her honor.

==== Death ====
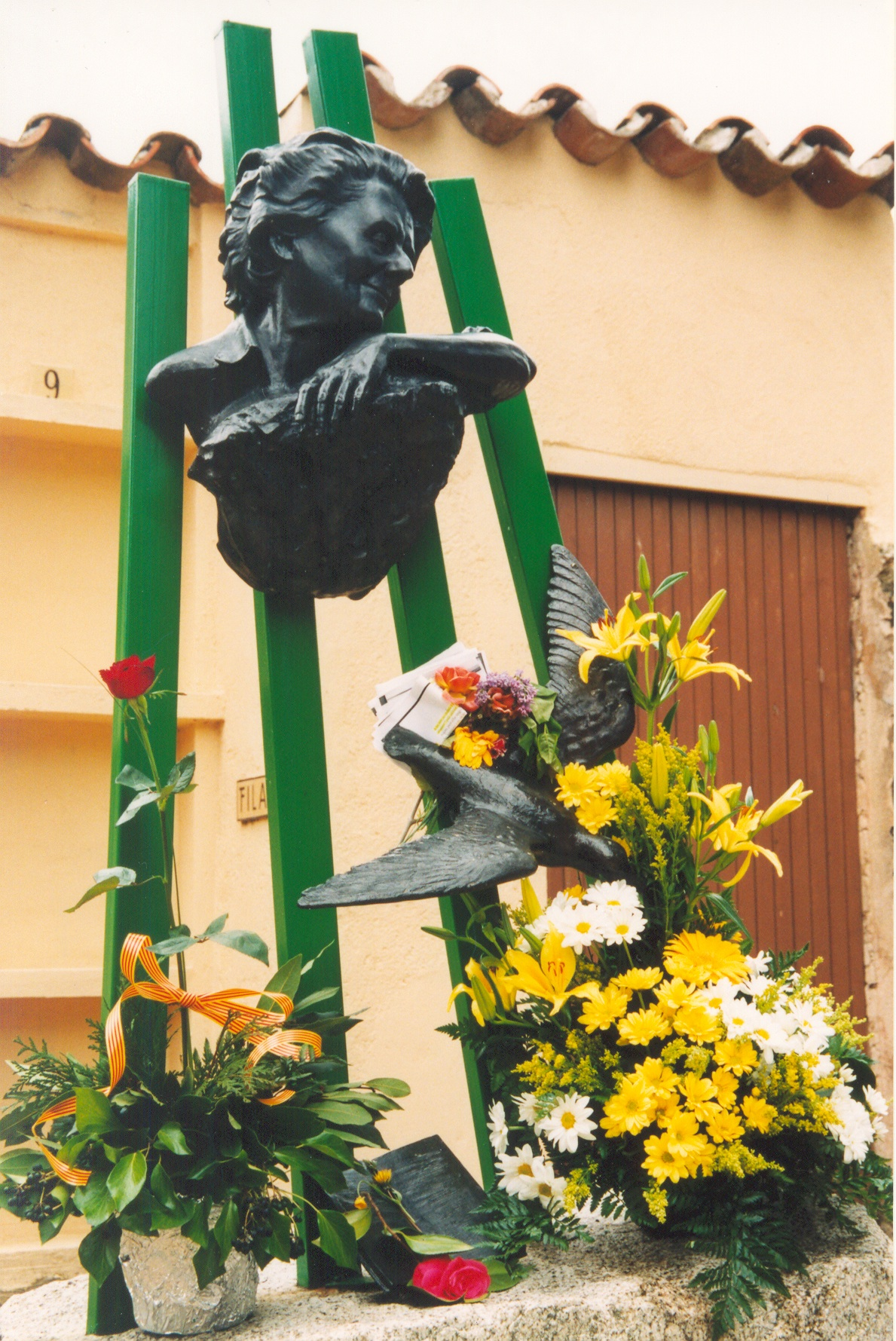
Mercè Rodoreda's grave in the Romanyà cemetery.

At 1:30 p.m. on April 13, 1983, Mercè Rodoreda died of very advanced liver cancer at the Muñoz Clinic, in Girona. During her last days, when she was already admitted to the hospital, she reconciled with the members of her family after they were notified by Joan Sales. As explained by Rodoreda's close friend, Isabel Parés, when Rodoreda was diagnosed with cancer, she collapsed and did not want to fight to live.

Death fled through the heart and when I no longer had death inside I died.

— Mercè Rodoreda, Death in Spring

The burning chapel was installed in the Palau Solterra of the Department of Culture of the Generalitat and, following her wishes, Rodoreda was buried in the Romanyà de la Selva cemetery in a massive burial attended by many of her colleagues and other personalities of the moment. Her intellectual legacy was inherited from the Institute for Catalan Studies, which years later created the Mercè Rodoreda Foundation.

Beloved, these things are life.

— Mercè Rodoreda, prologue to The Time of the Doves

== Selected bibliography ==
=== Original editions ===
==== Novels ====
- 1932, Soc una dona honrada? ("Am I an Honest Woman?") (Barcelona: Llibreria Catalòna).
- 1934, Del que hom no pot fugir ("What one Cannot Flee") (Barcelona: Clarisme).
- 1934, Un dia de la vida d'un home ("One Day in the Life of a Man") (Barcelona: Biblioteca a Tot Vent 70).
- 1936, Crim ("Murder") (Barcelona: Edicions de la Rosa dels Vents).
- 1938, Aloma (Barcelona: Institució de les Lletres Catalanes), revised in 1969 (Barcelona: Edicions 62).
- 1962, La plaça del diamant ("In Diamond Square") (Barcelona: Club Editor).
- 1966, El carrer de les Camèlies ("The Street of the Camellias") (Barcelona: Club Editor).
- 1967, Jardí vora el mar ("Garden by the Sea") (Barcelona: Club Editor).
- 1974, Mirall Trencat ("Broken Mirror") (Barcelona: Club Editor).
- 1980, Quanta, quanta guerra ... ("So Much War ...") (Barcelona: Club Editor).
- 1986 (posth.), La mort i la primavera ed. Nuria Folch ("Death in Spring") (Barcelona: Club Editor).
- 1997 (posth.), La mort i la primavera ed. Carme Arnau (Barcelona: Institut d'Estudis Catalan).
- 1991 (posth.), Isabel i Maria ("Isabel and Maria") ed. Carme Arnau) (Valencia: Ediciona 3 i 4).

==== Short story collections ====
- 1958, Vint-i-dos contes ("Twenty Two Stories") (Barcelona: Editorial Selecta).
- 1967, La meva Cristina i altres contes ("My Christina and Other Stories") (Barcelona: Edins 62).
- 1979, Semblava de seda i altres contes ("It Seemed Like Silk and Other Stories") (Barcelona: Edicions 62).
- 1980, Viatges i flors ("Travels and Flowers") (Barcelona: Edicions 62).

=== Complete works ===
- 1984, Obres completes (Barcelona: Edicions 62) ISBN 8429711716.

=== Bibliography ===
- Mendos, Maria Isidra, Mercè Rodoreda: A Selected and Annotated Bibliography (1963-2001) (Lanham, Maryland: Scarecrow Press, 2004) ISBN 0810850001.

=== English translations ===
- 1981, The Time of the Doves (Plaça del diamant) trans. David H. Rosenthal (New York: Taplinger) ISBN 0915308754.
- 1984, My Christina & Other Stories trans. David H. Rosenthal (Port Townsend, Washington: Graywolf Press) ISBN 0915308657.
- 1993, Camellia Street (El carrer de les Camèlies) trans. David H. Rosenthal (Saint Paul, Minnesota: Graywolf Press, 1993) ISBN 155597192X.
- 2006, A Broken Mirror (Mirall trencat) trans. Josep Miquel Sobrer (Lincoln, Nebraska: Bison Books) ISBN 0803239637.
- 2009, Death in Spring (La mort i la primavera) trans. Martha Tennent (Rochester, New York: Open Letter ISBN 1940953286.
- 2011, The Selected Stories of Mercè Rodoreda, trans. Martha Tennent (Rochester, New York: Open Letter) ISBN 9781934824313. (Selected from Vint-i-dos contes and La meva Cristina i altres contes).
- 2013, In Diamond Square (La plaça del diamant) trans. Peter Bush (London : Virago) ISBN 1844087379.
- 2015, War, So Much War (Quanta, quanta guerra …) trans. Martha Tennent and Maruxa Relaño (Rochester, New York: Open Letter) ISBN 1940953227. (Note: Briefly reviewed in the April 25, 2016 issue of The New Yorker, p.95.)
- 2020, Garden By the Sea (Jardi vora el mar) trans. Martha Tennent and Maruxa Relaño (Rochester, New York: Open Letter) ISBN 9781948830089.

———————

== See also ==
- Mercè Rodoreda Award
