= Institució de les Lletres Catalanes =

Spanish research organization

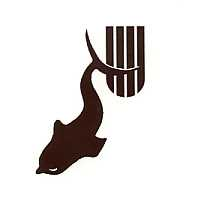
Logo during the Republican era

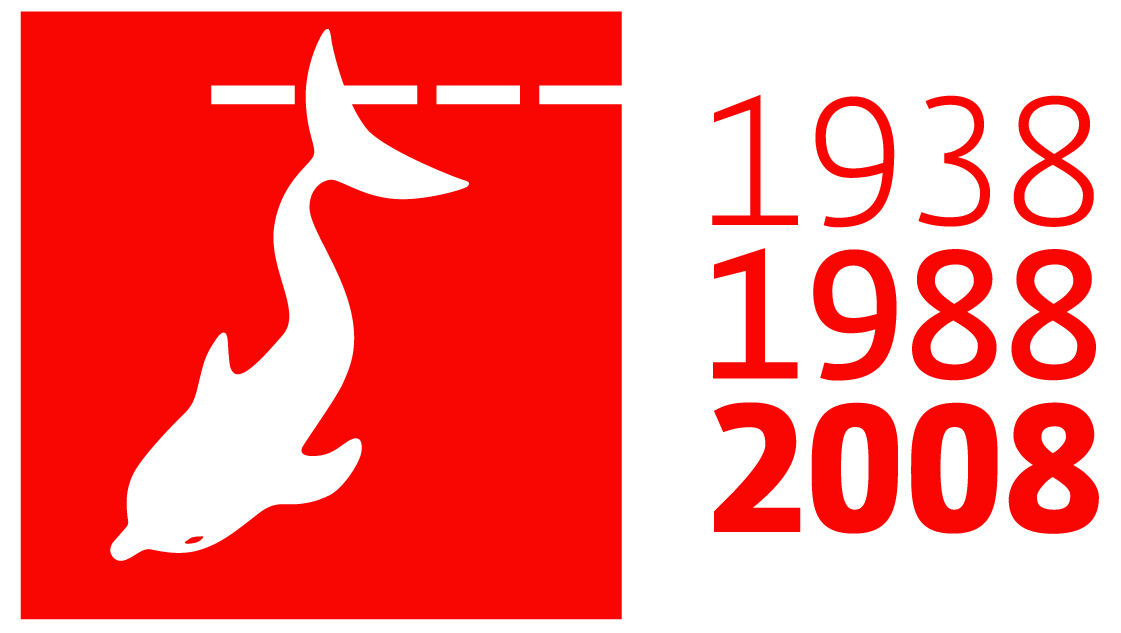
80th anniversary logo

Institució de les Lletres Catalanes (Institute of Catalan Letters) is a Spanish organization based in Barcelona. An entity of the Government of Catalonia, it was founded in 1937 by intellectuals who were loyal to the Republic during the Spanish Civil War. Its immediate predecessor was the Grup Sindical d'Escriptors Catalans (Association of Catalan Writers Group; 1936). The institute was initially set up in four sections:

- Editions: Josep Carner, Carles Riba, Ernest Martínez Ferrando, Joan Oliver, Cèsar August Jordana
- Journals: Antoni Rovira i Virgili, Jaume Serra i Húnter, Ferran Soldevila, Armand Obiols,
- Internal relations: Josep Pous i Pagès, Jordi Rubió, Pere Coromines, Joaquim Ruyra, Josep M. Capdevila
- External relations: Pompeu Fabra, Lluís Nicolau d'Olwer, Francesc Trabal, Gabriel Alomar

75th anniversary activities

Since its re-founding in 1987, the institute's deans have been Jordi Sarsanedas (1988 – 1999), Feliu Formosa (1999 – 2001), Maria Antònia Oliver (2001 – 2004), Josep Maria Benet i Jornet (2004 – 2006), Josep Maria Castellet (2006 – 2010) i Francesc Parcerisas (2010 – fins a l'actualitat) i directors Oriol Pi de Cabanyes (1988 – 1996), Magdalena Oliver (1996 – 1998), Francesc Parcerisas (1998 – 2004), Jaume Subirana (2004 – 2006), Oriol Izquierdo (2007 – 2013), Laura Borràs Castanyer (2013 – 2018), Joan-Elies Adell (2018 – 2019), Oriol Ponsatí-Murla (2019- today). In 2012, the institute celebrated its 75th anniversary with a retrospective exhibition at the Palau Moja in Barcelona.
