= Clementina Arderiu =

Spanish poet

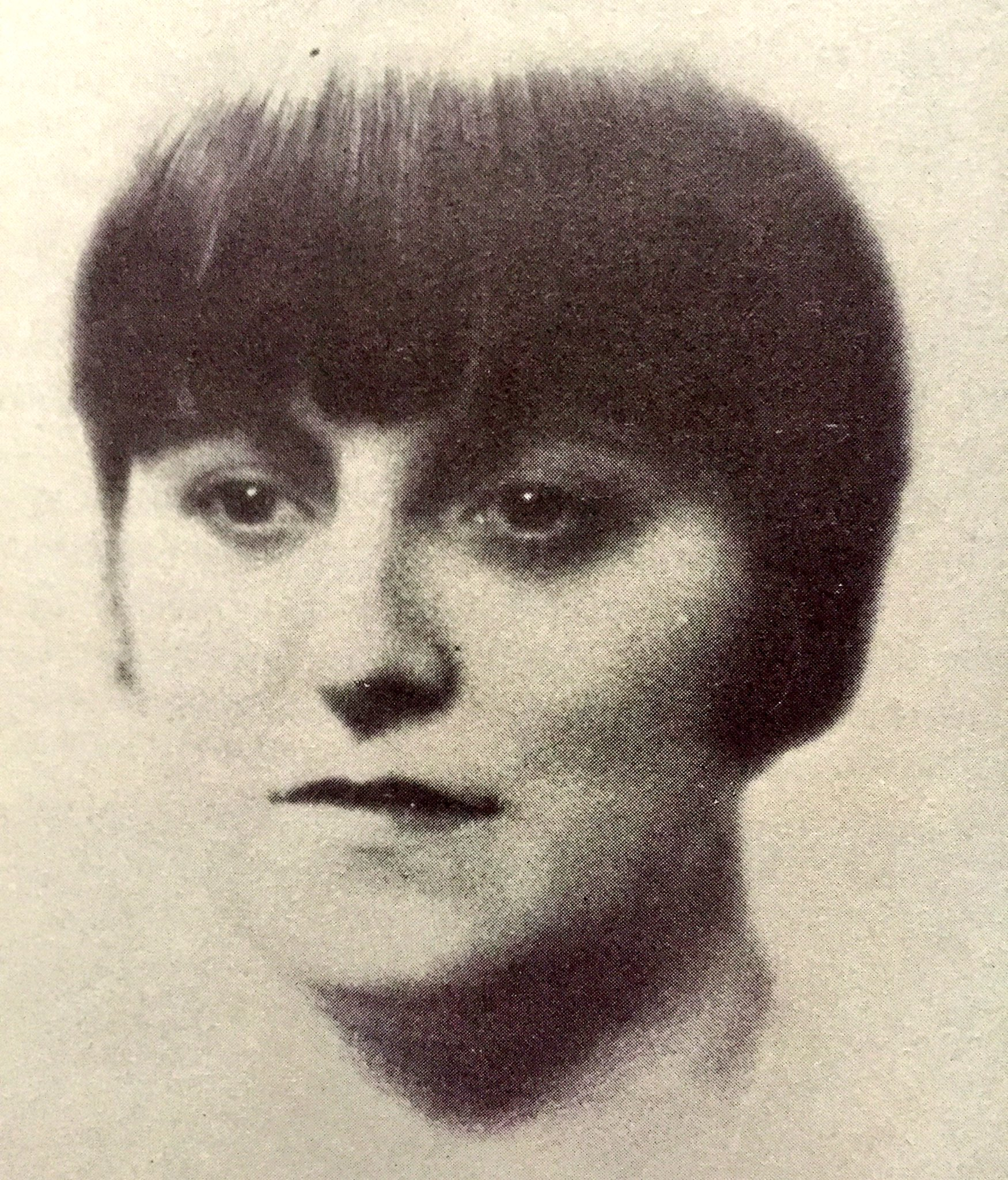
- Occupation: poet

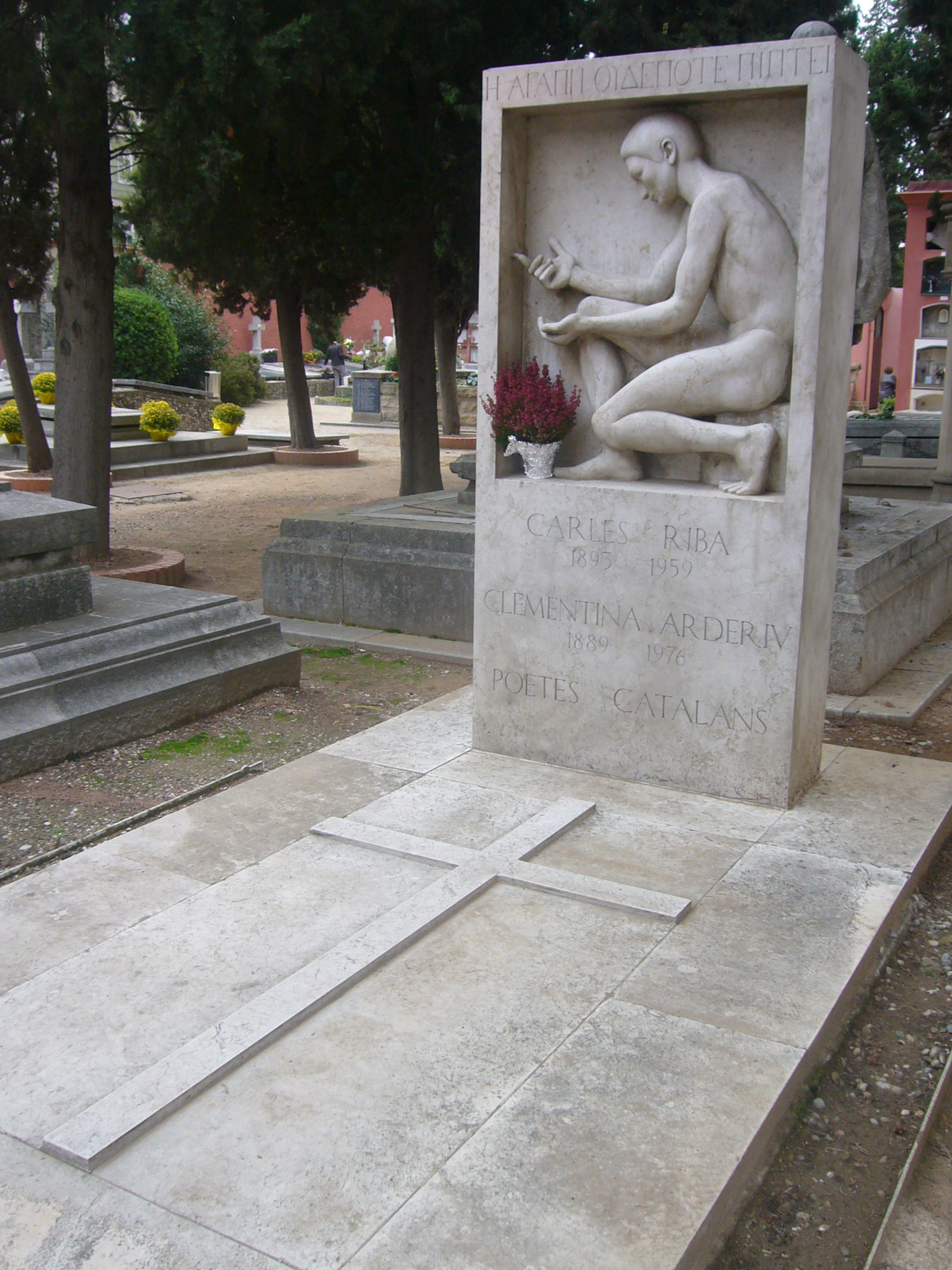
Grave of Arderiu and Riba in Barcelona

Clementina Arderiu (1889 in Barcelona – 1976) was a Catalan poet who wrote in the Catalan language.

Influences on her work included popular poetry, the Catalan language writer Josep Carner, and her husband, the poet Carles Riba.

Her poems tend to idealize daily life.

== Works ==
- Cançons i elegies, 1916
- L'alta llibertat, 1920
- Poemes, 1936
- Sempre i ara, 1946, Joaquim Folguera prize
- Poesies completes, 1952
- És a dir, 1968, Óssa Menor prize and Lletra d'Or prize
- L’esperança encara, 1968

== Recording from the Library of Congress ==
Clementina Arderíu reading twelve poems from her collected volumes, Poesia completas,1952.
