= David H. Rosenthal =

American author, poet, editor, and translator

David H. Rosenthal (1945–1992) was an American author, poet, editor, and translator. He wrote mostly on the history of jazz music and was also an important translator of Catalan literature. Among his translations was the abridged English rendering of the Catalan epic Tirant Lo Blanch, of which Cervantes said, "I swear to you, my friend, it's the best book of its kind in the world." In 1986, he translated popular Mercè Rodoreda's novel The Time of the Doves.

He died of pancreatic cancer at the age of 47. In 2008, his posthumous work in Catalan Banderes al vent!, a tribute to interwar Barcelona, was published, with a foreword by Joan Rendé and an epilogue by María Luisa García Bermejo.

== Selected books ==
- Eyes on the Street (1974)
- Modern Catalan Poetry (editor, 1979)
- Loves of the Poets: Poems (1989)
- Hard Bop: Jazz and Black Music 1955–1965 (1992)
- The Journey: Poems (1992)
- Four Postwar Catalan Poets (editor, 1994)

== Personal archive ==
David Rosenthal’s personal archive was added to the Humanities Library at the Universitat Autònoma de Barcelona in 2008. The collection comprises a selection of his handwritten and typescript translations, alongside various proof copies of the key works he translated, such as Tirant lo Blanch, The Book of Beasts, Uncertain glory, The Time of the Doves, Camellia Street, among others.

His notebooks contain a rich variety of unpublished writings, including drafts of poems, essays, jazz critiques, translations, and other materials. In addition, the archive holds copies of the works he published, both his own and the translations he produced throughout his career.
