= Aloma =

Aloma is a feminine given name (and occasionally a surname) of Catalan origin. Aloma is an extremely uncommon name, including in Catalonia.

The first appearance of the name Aloma is in a novel named Blanquerna written in 1283 by Ramon Llull. The name has a second literary appearance in 1937, when Catalan writer Mercè Rodoreda wrote her novel Aloma. In it, the main character is baptized Àngela Rosa Maria, but an uncle of the mother, reader of Ramon Llull, tells that "I will always call her Aloma. It is a beautiful name and the first thing a girl needs is a beautiful name."

== Notable people ==
Notable people with the name include:

=== As a given name ===
- Aloma Mariam Mukhtar (born 1944), Nigerian jurist and former Chief Justice of Nigeria
- Aloma Wright (born 1950), American actress

=== As a surname ===
- Hal Aloma (1908–1980), Hawaiian musician
