= Bierville Elegies =

The Bierville Elegies (Catalan: Les elegies de Bierville) is the most outstanding work by the Catalan poet Carles Riba (1893-1959). Once Riba and his family embarked on the path of exile in France towards the end of the Spanish Civil War of 1936 to 1939, they settled first in the castle of Bierville (Boissy-la-Rivière, present-day department of Essonne) and there, between March and July 1939, what would later become the Elegies began to take shape. Riba continued the work between July 1939 and June 1940 in L'Isle-Adam, then for eight months in Bordeaux. The Elegies reached their final form in Montpellier, where Riba settled. Along with Nabí (1941) by Josep Carner and Antigone (Catalan: Antígona, 1955) by Salvador Espriu, the Elegies of Bierville constitute one of the great works of modern Catalan literature and the prime post-civil-war pieces marked by the political situation.

Written between 1939 and 1942, the Elegies were published in Barcelona after a year in an edition that bore the imprint of Buenos Aires and the date 1942; this edition was shortened, however. In 1949 in Santiago, Chile, the first complete edition of the work appeared, but the distance between Chile and Catalonia meant that this work remained unknown to the Catalan public. Finally, the complete edition came out in 1951 in Barcelona and quickly made a big impact.

In the Elegies the poet melds three very different realities, which are fostered by loneliness and lack of history of the landscape of Bierville and become almost legendary:

- the poet's self,
- that of his people, and
- a common homeland of Greece, to which the poet is now traveling, now that he is not in his own homeland

The work portrays a spiritual adventure, represented through a journey into the past powered by the memory, preferably with an image of the sea, which ends in the penultimate elegy in the collection, which has been considered a kind of a spiritual song, with the rediscovery of one's own identity and personal divinity of God and of collectivity. The religious dimension, which until then was not present in Riba's poetry, penetrated deeply throughout his thinking, including the conception of literature. That dimension appeared again in the later poetic works such as Savage Heart (Salvatge cor, 1952) and Sketch of Three Oratorios (Esbós de tres oratoris, 1957).
