= Death in Spring =

Novel of Mercè Rodoreda

- Cover of Open Letter Books edition, 2009
- Author: Mercè Rodoreda
- Original title: La mort i la primavera
- Translator: Martha Tennent
- Publisher: Open Letter Books
- Publication date: 1986
- English publication date: 2009
- ISBN: 9781934824115 (Open Letter Books edition, 2009)

Death in Spring is an unfinished novel by Catalan author Mercè Rodoreda. It was first published in Catalan as La mort i la primavera in 1986. It was released in English in 2009 by Open Letter Books, translated by Martha Tennent. It was rereleased by Penguin European Writers in 2018. Rodoreda wrote the work in the early 1960s when she was in exile, and it is thought to be a condemnation of totalitarianism and Rodoreda's experience with Nazism during WWII.

== Premise ==
The novel focuses on a small town shadowed by a mysterious river and forest. The narrator, a teenaged boy, sees both his father and mother die grotesquely. The villagers have several violent customs, like forcing a young man to swim in the underground aquifer of the town every year, and burying villagers in trees. The townspeople also suffer from fear of the caramens, a mysterious shadow people. The narrator, and by extension her audience, must struggle with the senselessness of violence when it is integral to the fabric of a society. As the book progresses, the narrator becomes more and more invested in the forest of death, where townspeople are buried. He fathers a child with his widowed stepmother, who is not much older than he is. The book progresses through the seasons, and Rodoreda uses this repetition, and other forms, frequently as literary devices.

== Ending ==
Death in Spring is thought to be unfinished. It ends with the narrator in the forest of the dead, making a cross out of nails, and beginning the suicide ritual. It is possible that this ending was a purposeful choice by Rodoreda; allowing both the tangibility of nihilism and the reality of hope to collide just beyond the final pages of the novel.
