= Open Letter Books =

American nonprofit literary publisher

- Founded: 2008
- Founder: Chad W. Post
- Country of origin: United States
- Headquarters location: Rochester, New York
- Distribution: Ingram Content Group, Consortium Book Sales & Distribution
- Publication types: Books
- Official website: www.openletterbooks.org

Open Letter Books is an American publishing house based at the University of Rochester in Rochester, New York. It was founded in 2008 by Chad W. Post, the Editor-in-Chief of Dalkey Archive Press. It specializes in translation, a less-populated field in American publishing.

== Publications ==
Open Letter is a literary press that publishes ten books annually—mostly novels and short stories, and one book of poetry. The press also runs Three Percent, an extensive online resource for literature in translation, which presents the yearly Best Translated Book Award. The press has received funding perennially from the National Endowment for the Arts, as well as from the University of Rochester, New York State Council on the Arts, Amazon.com, and a variety of international foundations and individuals. At present, they have published around a hundred books from over twenty different languages.

Past publications include the works of Marguerite Duras, Can Xue, Rodrigo Fresán, Sara Mesa, Bae Suah, Kristín Ómarsdóttir, Mercè Rodoreda, and Bragi Ólafsson.

== Premises and personnel ==
The Press is affiliated with the Literary Translation Studies program at the University of Rochester. Its current editors are Chad W. Post, Kaija Straumanis, and Anastasia Nikolis (poetry). Decisions on publication are made jointly by Open Letter's editorial board and executive committee and manuscripts are acquired both through open submission and solicitation.
