= Jaume Subirana i Ortín =

Catalan writer, scholar, and blogger

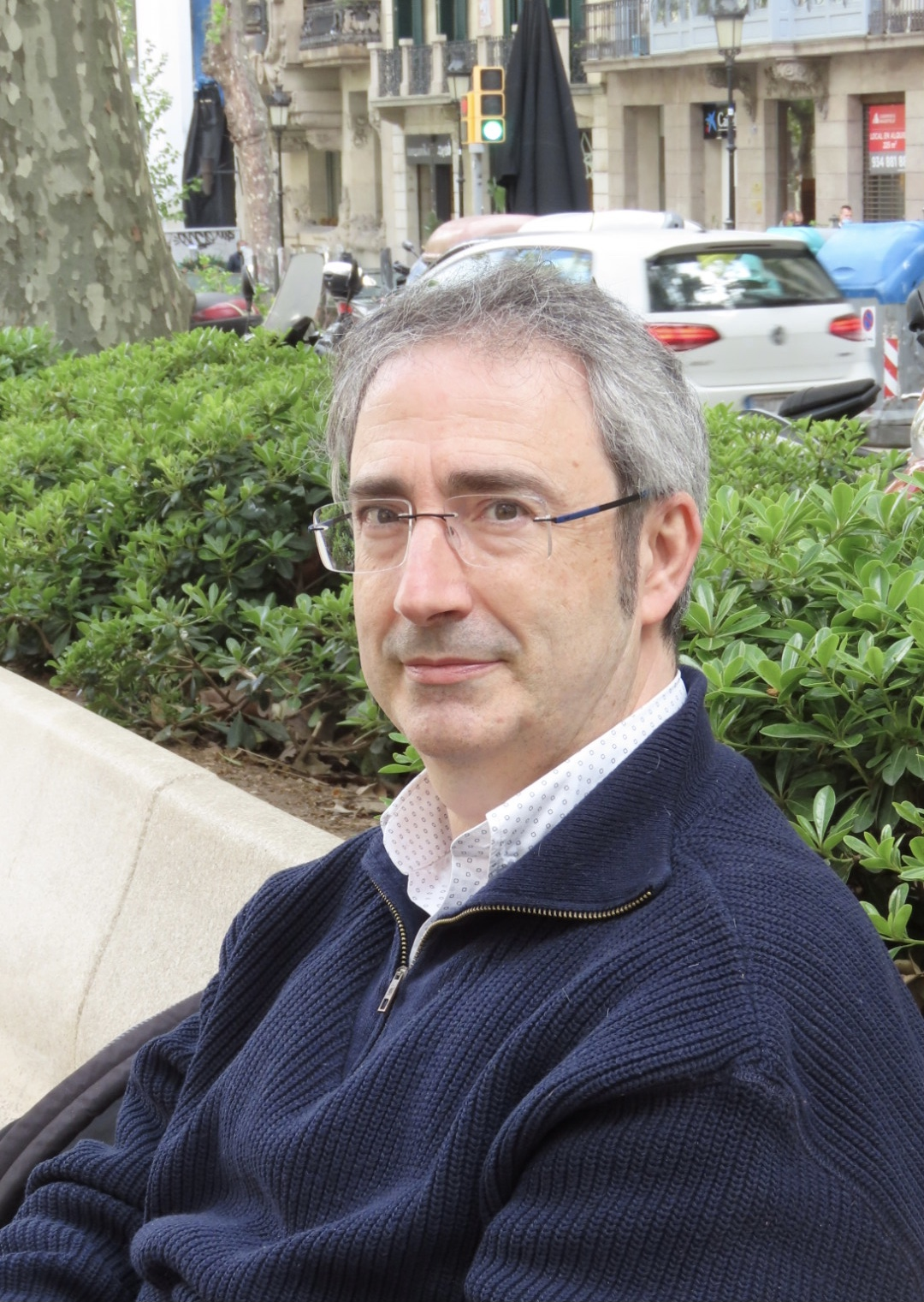
Jaume Subirana i Ortín in 2021.

Jaume Subirana (Catalan pronunciation: [ˈʒawmə suβiˈɾanə]; born 15 March 1963 in Barcelona) is a Catalan writer, scholar, and blogger. Associate Professor of literature at Pompeu Fabra University (Barcelona). He holds a PhD in Catalan Language and Literature from the Universitat Autònoma de Barcelona (1999), and a degree in Arts from the same university.

He has translated into Catalan Ray Bradbury, Billy Collins, Seamus Heaney (with Pauline Ernest), Ted Kooser (with Miquel Àngel Llauger), Gary Snyder (with José Luis Regojo) and R.L. Stevenson. His poems have been published in German, Castilian, French, Italian, Russian and Chinese anthologies.

Visiting scholar at Duke University (1996) and visiting professor at the University of British Columbia (2007), Brown University (2011), Università Ca’ Foscari Venezia (2012), and Trinity College, Hartford (2018). He has also stayed as a Fulbright Scholar researcher at the Department of Romance Languages and Literatures of the University of Chicago (2017).

He served as dean of Institució de les Lletres Catalanes (2004–06).

== Publications ==
=== Poetry ===
- Final de festa (1989). Carles Riba Prize
- El rastre de l'animal més lliure (1994)
- Rapala (2007)
- Una pedra sura (2011). Gabriel Ferrater Prize
- La hac (2020)

=== Diaries ===
- Suomenlinna (2000)
- Adrada (2005)
- Cafarnaüm (2017). Mancomunitat de la Ribera Alta Prize

=== Essay ===
- Josep Carner, l'exili del mite (1945–1970)’‘ (2000). Ferran Soldevila Biographies Prize
- Tota la veritat sobre els catalans (2001)
- BarcelonABC. Alfabet d'una ciutat (2013)
- Construir con palabras. Escritores, literatura e identidad en Cataluña. 1859-2019 (2018)

=== In English ===
- “New Catalan Fiction”, The Review of Contemporary Fiction’‘ (2008), vol. XXVIII, #1 (Dalkey Archives)
- BarcelonABC. A City Alphabet (2013)
- E. Bou, J. Subirana (eds.), The Barcelona Reader. Cultural Readings of a City (2017)
- The Silent Letter (2020, translated by Christopher Whyte)

=== In Spanish ===
- El rastro del animal más libre (2001)
- Construir con palabras. Escritores, literatura e identidad en Cataluña. 1859-2019 (2018)
- Rama de agua (2020, translated by Jordi Virallonga)

=== In German ===
- Willkommen in Katalonien. Eine literarische Entdeckungsreise (2007)
