= The Time of the Doves =

Novel by Mercè Rodoreda

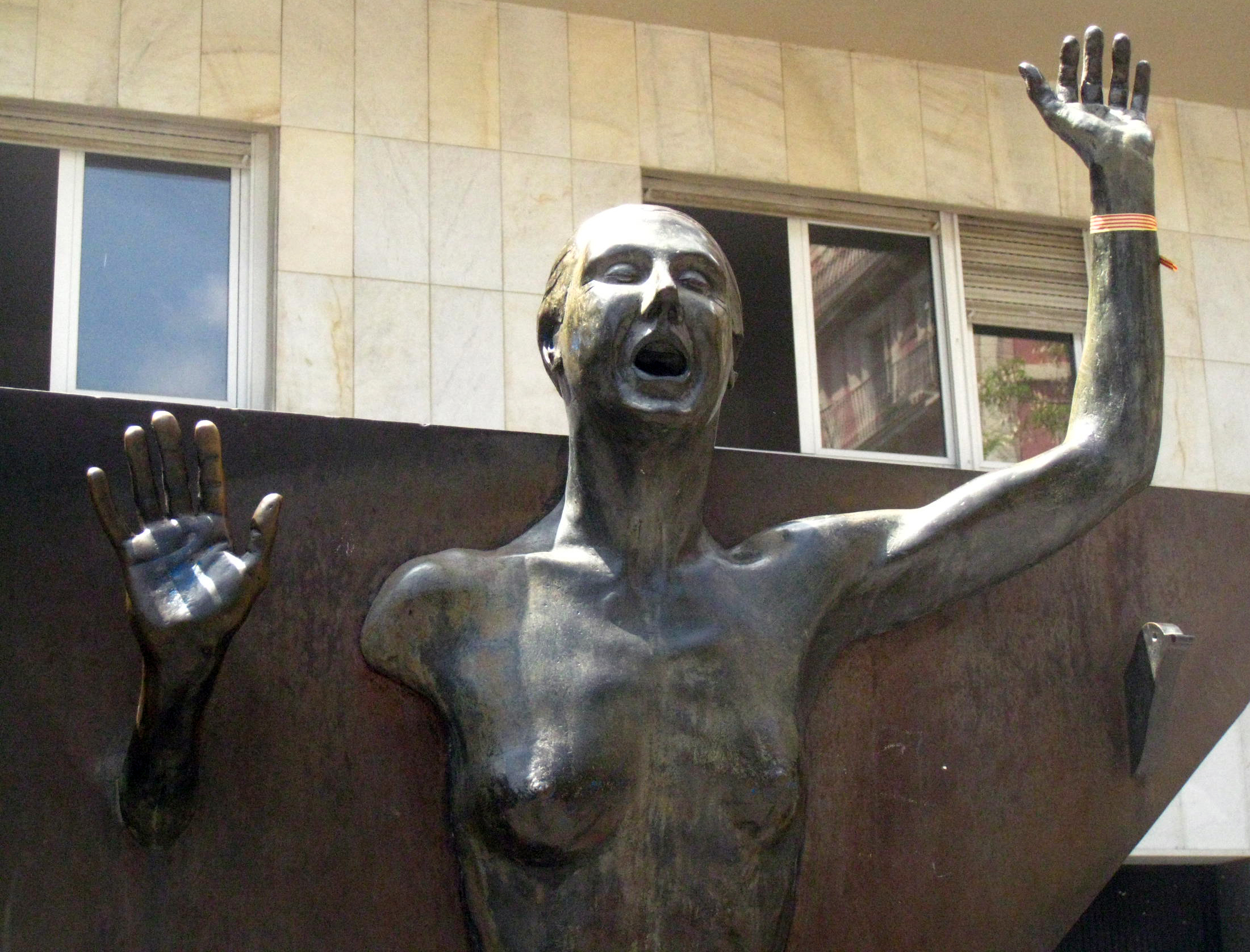
The Time of the Doves

The Time Of The Doves (also translated as The Pigeon Girl or In Diamond Square; original Catalan-language: La plaça del Diamant, that is Diamond Square) is a 1962 novel written by exiled Catalan writer Mercè Rodoreda.

The book is named after a square in Barcelona's Gràcia district. It is featured in Harold Bloom's The Western Canon as part of a list of canonical books of the "Chaotic Age". Arguably the author's most accomplished work, the novel has been translated into more than thirty languages and is regarded as one of the most important pieces of fiction in contemporary Catalan literature. It is also a staple of the curriculum in secondary school programs across Catalonia.

Set in Barcelona during the Second Spanish Republic and the Spanish Civil War, the novel pictures a young woman, Natalia (nicknamed Colometa, the Pigeon Girl), and her struggles in life as well as her relationships with two men: Quimet, her first husband, who dies in the war; and Antoni, her second husband. It is also a chronicle of life in the city at the time, in a balanced mixture of psychologism and naturalism.

== Adaptations ==
It was made into a film in 1982 directed by Francesc Betriu, and has spawned several theatrical adaptations, including a play directed by Joan Ollé in 2004, and another in 2007 adapted by Josep M. Benet i Jornet.

== English translations ==
- The Pigeon Girl. Translated by Eda O'Shiel. London: André Deutsch, 1967.
- The Time Of The Doves. Translated by David H. Rosenthal. New York: Taplinger Publishing Company, 1980.
- In Diamond Square. Translated by Peter Bush. London: Virago Press Ltd, 2013.

== See also ==
- Catalan literature
