= War, So Much War =

Novel by Mercè Rodoreda

War, So Much War (Catalan: Quanta, quanta guerra...) is a Catalan novel that was written by the author Mercè Rodoreda, first published in 1980. The novel was written during the author's stay in the house of her friend Carme Manrubia, in Romanyà de la Selva. This book together with Viatges a uns quants pobles, a part of the series Viatges i flors, Made Rodoreda win the Barcelona prize. The book also received the Crítica Serra d'Or prize in 1980.

Ana María Moix was the writer who translated the book from Catalan to Spanish; the translated book was published in 1982.

According to the explanation of the author in the prologue to the book, the original title of the book was supposed to be: El soldat i les roses (The soldier and the roses) and the name of the protagonist of the novel was to be Manuel. Nevertheless, this idea was changed and "Manuel" became Adrià Guinart. Rodoreda also confessed that in "War so much war" is not a show of battles because her intention was to do the same as Jan Potocki in the novel, The Manuscript Found in Saragossa where Zaragoza is also not shown.

== Plot ==
During the Spanish civil war, Adrià Guinart, a fifteen-year-old boy, tired of his lack of life experience and his yearning for freedom, decides to go to the front with his childhood friend. During the war, Adrià's personality is in a real process of learning about human nature.

"I left home so that I could encounter new villages, meet people, and because I was tired of my mother. . and nothing could have stopped me. And also so I could go off to war. Although I've had the war close-at-hand, I can't say I have experienced it, because I fled from it as often as I could"
