= Hôtel de Ville, Roissy-en-Brie =

Town hall in Roissy-en-Brie, France

Hôtel de Ville
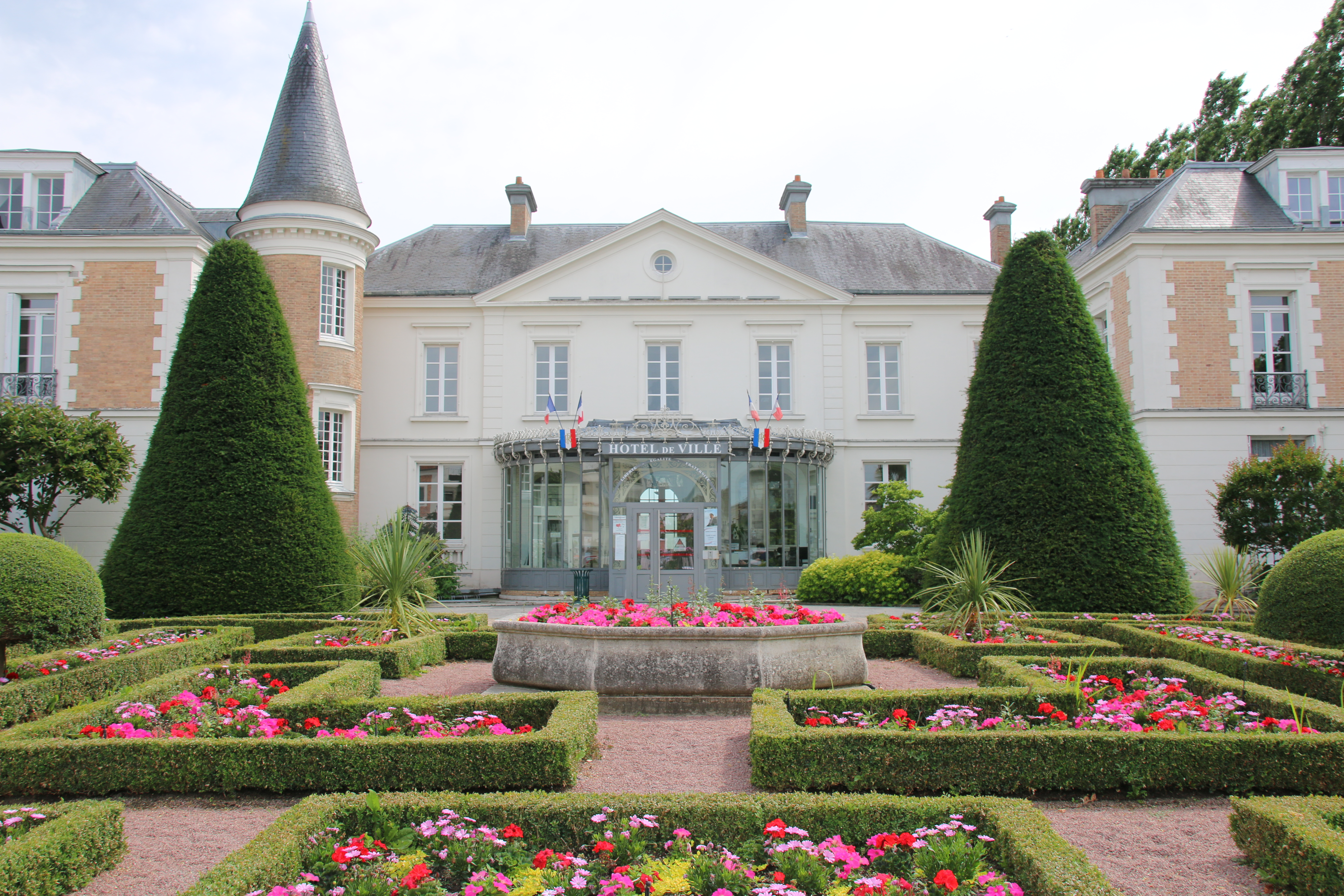
- The main frontage of the Hôtel de Ville in May 2020
- Interactive map of the Hôtel de Ville area

General information
- Type: City hall
- Architectural style: Louis XIII style
- Location: Roissy-en-Brie, France
- Coordinates: 48.7907°N 2.6545°E
- Completed: 1665

The Hôtel de Ville (French pronunciation: [otɛl də vil], City Hall) is a municipal building in Roissy-en-Brie, Seine-et-Marne, in the southeastern suburbs of Paris, standing on Rue Pasteur.

== History ==
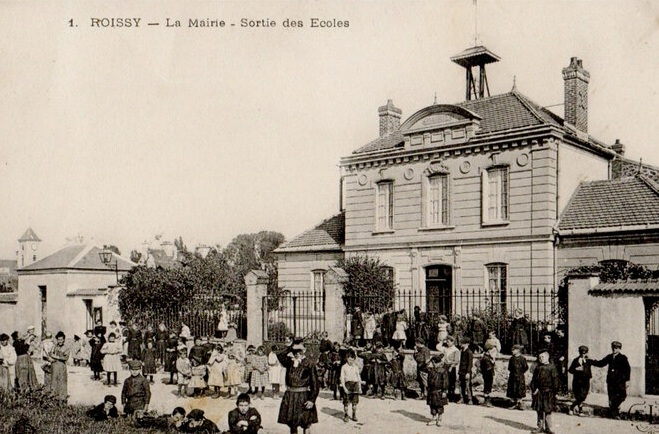
The old town hall

=== The old town hall ===
Following the French Revolution, the town council initially met in the house of the mayor at the time. This arrangement continued until the mid-19th century, when the council decided to commission a combined town hall and school. The site they selected was on the east side of the junction of Chemin de Pontault (now Rue de Pontault), the Grande Rue (now Rue Pasteur) and Premiere Avenue. The building was designed in the neoclassical style, built in ashlar stone and was completed in around 1857.

The complex was laid out as a two-storey main building with a pair of single-storey wings. The design of the main building involved a symmetrical main frontage of three bays facing onto the street. The central bay featured a segmental headed doorway flanked by pilasters on the ground floor, a segmental headed window on the first floor, and a parapet surmounted by a segmental pediment at roof level. Behind the pediment, there was a small lantern. The outer bays were fenestrated by segmental headed windows with voussoirs on the ground floor and by segmental headed windows with keystones on the first floor. Internally, the principal room was the Salle du Conseil (council chamber) on the first floor. After the building was no longer required for municipal purposes, it served as a youth club, then as a police station and finally as a food bank known as Restos du Cœur. However, it was subsequently abandoned and became dilapidated. In 2018, the council proposed selling the site to a developer so that the building could be demolished and replaced by housing units.

=== The château ===
In 1960, following significant population growth, the council led by the mayor, Henri-Auguste Sassinot, decided to acquire a more substantial building. The building they selected was the Château de Roissy, on the south side of Rue Pasteur, approximately 450 metres (1,480 ft) east of the old town hall. The château had been designed in the Louis XIII style, built in brick with a cement render finish and, according to the memoirist, Roger de Rabutin, comte de Bussy, it dated back to at least 1665.

The château was the property of Jean-Baptiste de Raincourt, Marquis de Raincourt, in the 18th century. It was acquired by a Parisian businessman, Simon Gibé, in 1817, by the violinist, Charles Auguste de Bériot, in 1835 and by the ophthalmologist, Photinos Panas, in 1881. It then served as the home of the filmmaker, Charles Pathé, from 1913. In 1939, the château briefly became the home of Catalan intellectuals fleeing from the Spanish Civil War: these included Agustí Bartra, Anna Murià, Carles Riba, Mercè Rodoreda and Francesc Trabal. After being occupied by German troops during the Second World War, it was in a dilapidated state when it was acquired by the council some 15 years later.

The design involved an asymmetrical main frontage of nine bays facing onto the street, with the end bays projected forward as pavilions. The central section featured a round-headed opening fronted by a single storey curved glass porch, while the first floor was fenestrated by casement windows with cornices. The central three bays were flanked by banded pilasters supporting a pediment with an oculus in the tympanum. The other bays were fenestrated in a similar style and, to the left of the central section, there was a round tower with a conical roof. Internally, the principal room was a large reception room, now used as the Salle du Conseil (council chamber).
