= Hal Aloma =

Hawaiian musician (1908–1980)

- Born: Harold David Alama; January 8, 1908
- Died: June 26, 1980 (aged 72)
- Occupation: Musician

Hal Aloma (January 8, 1908 – June 26, 1980) was a Hawaiian steel guitarist, singer and bandleader.

== Biography ==
Aloma was born on January 8, 1908 in Honolulu as Harold David Alama. He changed his name in the 1930s in response to the movies Bird of Paradise and Aloma of the South Seas. Aloma joined Lani McIntyre's band as steel guitarist. He began his musical career with his brother, Sam Alama, at the Alexander Young Hotel and the Moana Hotel. Under his own name, he recorded three sessions for Decca Records between February and April 1944. In 1944, when McIntyre left a four-year booking at the Hawaiian Room in New York's Hotel Lexington, Aloma formed his own band and took over the engagement. MGM booked him for two sessions in 1952, resulting in eight sides which were later compiled into an LP album. He first recorded for Columbia Records in August and September 1953, resulting in the song appearing not only on U.S. Columbia, but on Japanese Columbia and Philips in the Netherlands. He was featured on the Ed Sullivan Show on June 19, 1960, in a segment in tribute to Hawaii's statehood. When Disney's Polynesian Village Resort opened, Aloma was the bandleader. Aloma died on June 26, 1980.

== Style ==
Aloma was accounted as a "typical" traditional Hawaiian singer, although he recorded tracks intended to appeal to currently popular tastes. His original band's instrumentation had more in common with the big band of the day than with traditional Hawaiian music. Nevertheless, it was accounted to be smooth "island music" even though it also performed current American pop music. In addition to musicians, his touring band also employed young women as hula dancers. Billboard stated that "Hawaiian music at its best is expected" of Aloma, describing his music as authentic and charming. He composed more than 65 songs.

== Partial discography ==
=== Albums ===
- King's Serenade - Decca A-429. (1946)
- King's Serenade Volume 2 - Decca A-506 (1946)
- A Musical Portrait of Hawaii - Columbia CL 538. (1950s)
- The Lure Of The Islands Dot Records 3507/25957 (1957)
- Hal Aloma Sings Hawaiian Songs - Dot 3451/25451 (1962)
- Hawaiian Dreams - Dot 3758/25758 (1966)
