= Roissy-en-Brie =

- Commune
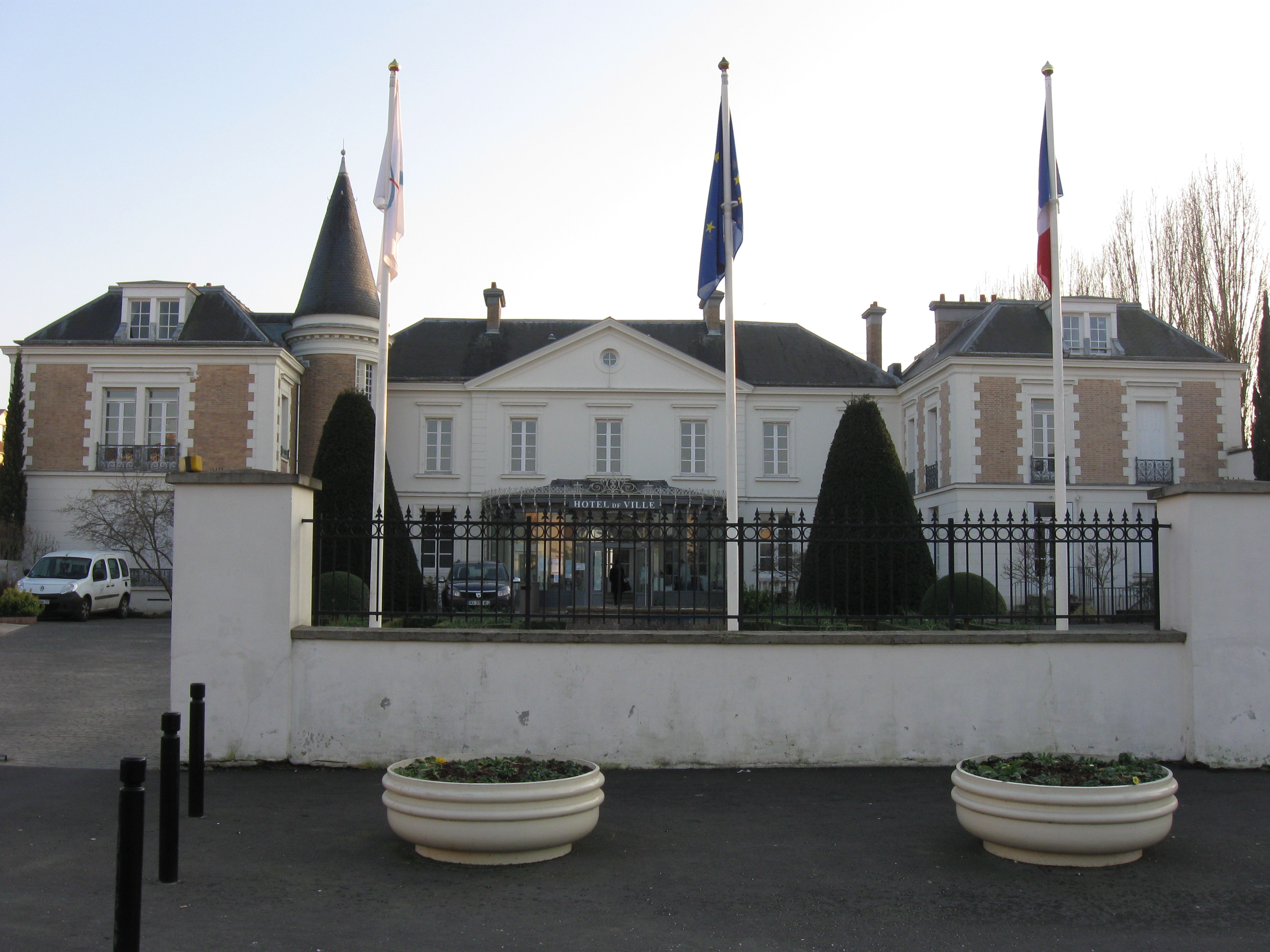
- The Hôtel de Ville

- Coat of arms

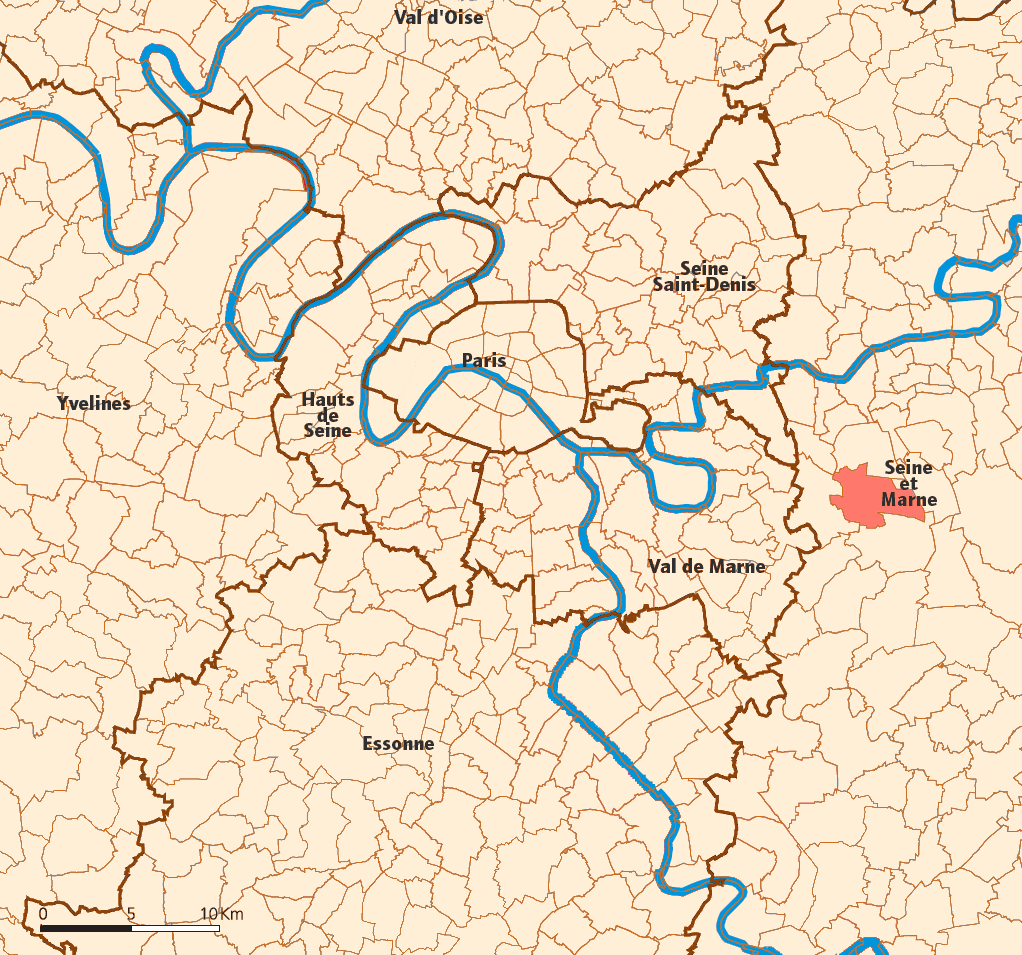
- Location (in red) within Paris inner and outer suburbs
- Location of Roissy-en-Brie
- Location within France Location within Île-de-France (region)
- Coordinates: 48°47′26″N 2°39′07″E
- Country: France
- Region: Île-de-France
- Department: Seine-et-Marne
- Arrondissement: Torcy
- Canton: Pontault-Combault
- Intercommunality: CA Paris - Vallée de la Marne

Government
  - Mayor (2020–2026): François Bouchart
- Area^{1}: 13.65 km^{2} (5.27 sq mi)
- Highest elevation: 115 m (377 ft)
- Lowest elevation: 95 m (312 ft)
- Population (2023): 23,229
  - Density: 1,702/km^{2} (4,408/sq mi)
- Time zone: UTC+01:00 (CET)
  - Summer (DST): UTC+02:00 (CEST)
- INSEE/Postal code: 77390 /77680
- ^{1} French Land Register data, which excludes lakes, ponds, glaciers > 1 km^{2} (0.386 sq mi or 247 acres) and river estuaries.

Roissy-en-Brie (French pronunciation: [ʁwasi ɑ̃ bʁi], literally Roissy in Brie, before 1988: Roissy) is a commune in the Seine-et-Marne department in the Île-de-France region in north-central France and is located in the eastern suburbs of Paris, 23.4 km (14.5 mi) from the center.

== History ==
The Hôtel de Ville dates back at least to 1665.

In 1810, Roissy-en-Brie annexed the neighboring commune of Pontcarré. In 1829 Pontcarré seceded and was restored as a separate commune.

== Population ==
Historical population

Year	Pop.	±% p.a.
1793	324	—
1821	761	+3.10%
1846	471	−1.90%
1872	409	−0.54%
1901	476	+0.52%
1921	424	−0.58%
1946	778	+2.46%
1954	917	+2.08%
1962	1,900	+9.53%

Year	Pop.	±% p.a.
1968	2,561	+5.10%
1975	10,881	+22.96%
1982	15,274	+4.96%
1990	18,688	+2.55%
1999	19,693	+0.58%
2007	21,971	+1.38%
2012	22,518	+0.49%
2017	22,994	+0.42%
2023	23,229	+0.17%

Source: EHESS and INSEE (1968-2023)

== Transportation ==
Roissy-en-Brie is served by Roissy-en-Brie station on Paris RER line.

== Demographics ==
The inhabitants are called Roisséens.

== See also ==
- Communes of the Seine-et-Marne department
