= Francesc Trabal =

Catalan novelist, journalist and humorist

- Born: Francesc Trabal i Benessat; 5 May 1899; Sabadell, Spain
- Died: 8 November 1957 (aged 58); Santiago, Chile
- Other name: Senyor Banyeta
- Occupation: novelist
- Years active: 20th century
- Notable work: Waltz

Francesc Trabal (5 May 1899 – 8 November 1957) was a Catalan novelist, journalist and humorist.

He was one of the founders of the Colla de Sabadell (the Sabadell Gang), where they started La Mirada publishing house. They promoted Catalan culture, literature and humour using the newspaper El Diari de Sabadell (Sabadell Newspaper) as a platform. He was one of the founders of the El Club dels Novel·listes (Novelists Club), predecessor of today's Institució de les Lletres Catalanes.

After the Spanish Civil War, he settled in the Château de Roissy, a 17th-century building, which was offered as a refuge for writers.

He then went into exile in Chile, where he continued promoting Catalan culture. He started a Chilean-Catalan Institute for Culture, along with different publishing initiatives.

== Works ==
(All originally written in Catalan)

- L'any que ve (1925).
- L'home que es va perdre (1929).
  - Translated to Spanish by Javier Cercas (1992), to French by Marie-José Castaing (2011), and to Italian by Simone Cattaneo (2019).
- Judita (1930).
  - Translated to Spanish by Manuel Salvat (1941) and by Montserrat Planas and Marta Pessarrodona (1972), and to French by Montserrat Prudon (1994).
- Quo vadis, Sànchez? with drawings by Valentí Castanys (1931).
- Era una dona com les altres (1932).
- Hi ha homes que ploren perquè el sol es pon (1933).
- Vals (1935).
  - Translated to Spanish by Joan Oliver (1945), to English by Martha Tennent (2013), and to Dutch by Frans Oosterholt (2015).
- Temperatura (1947).
  - Translated to Spanish by himself (1947).
