= Joan Oliver i Sallarès =

Catalan poet, playwright, literary manager, translator, narrator, and journalist

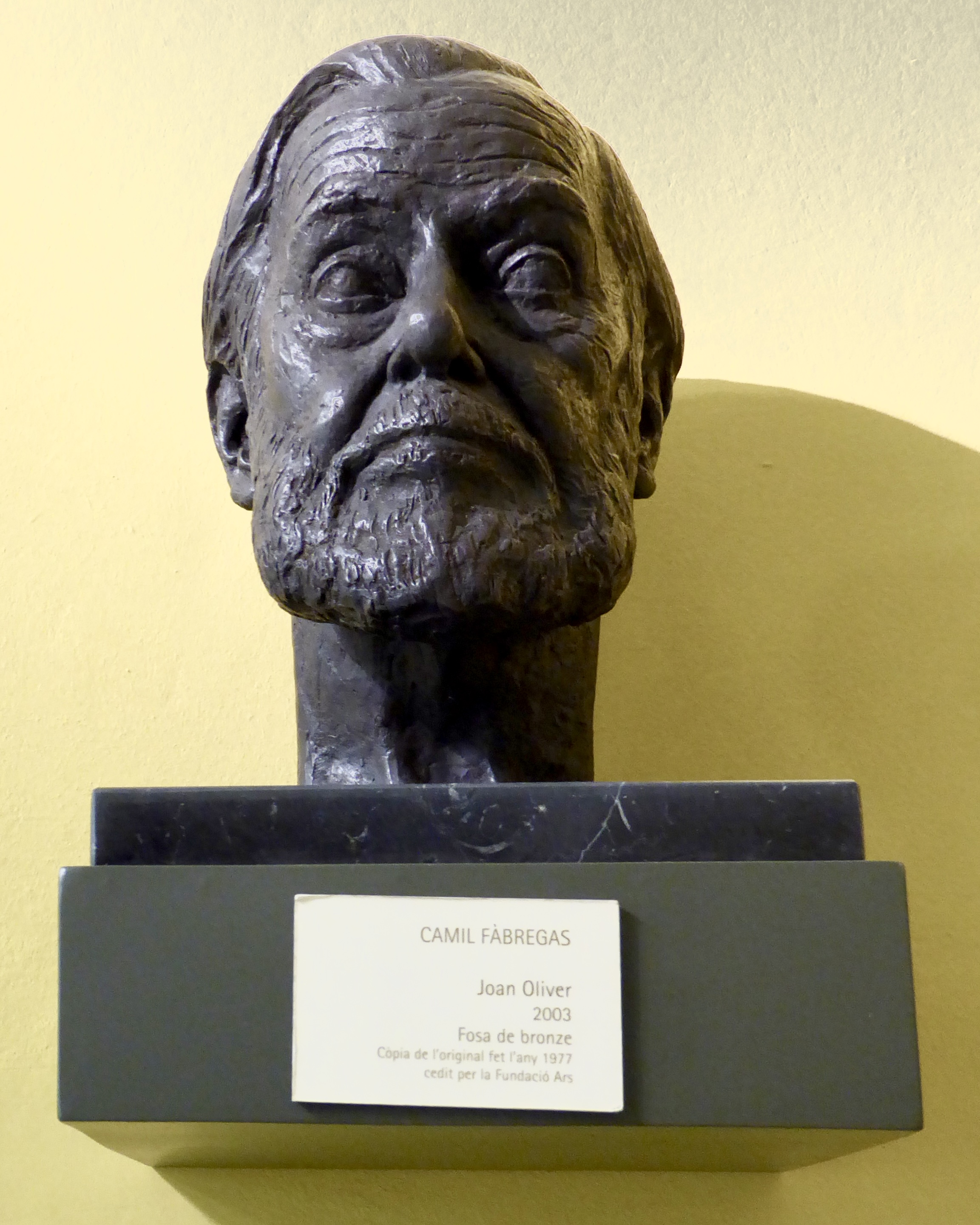

Joan Oliver i Sallarès (Catalan pronunciation: [ʒuˈan uliˈβej səʎəˈɾɛs]), also known by his pseudonym Pere Quart, (1899 in Sabadell – 1986 in Barcelona) was a Catalan poet, playwright, literary manager, translator, narrator, and journalist. He is considered one of the most important twentieth-century writers of Catalonia.

== Biography ==
=== Towards the political commitment ===
He was born in 1899, the member of an outstanding family of the industrial bourgeoisie of Sabadell. He was the fourth of eleven brothers; he was the only survivor. He took the pseudonym with which he would sign his poetic work: Pere Quart. He studied law. In year 1919, he formed the Group of Sabadell with the novelist Francesc Trabal and the poet Armand Obiols. In this group the influence of vanguardism was combined with local humor.

=== The Civil War and the exile ===
During the Civil War he engaged politically with the republican side. He was nominated president of the Association of Catalan Writers and leader of Generalitat's Ministry of Culture publications. Moreover, he was co-founder and headleader of Institution of the Catalan Letters publications, and author of the Catalan popular army hymn's letter. All this means a definite break with his bourgeois past and the birth of a strong political, ethical and social commitment. In this context he created "Ode to Barcelona" (of clear nationalistic and revolutionary trend) and the play "The Hunger" (La Fam, where the problems of the revolution are brought up). At the end of the war, the Republican Generalitat will order him the task of evacuating all the intellectuals. Finished the war will exile first in France, embark towards Buenos Aires and establish definitively in Santiago of Chile, where he will live for eight years. During the exile, he continued his task of intellectual compromised with his time and his country. He collaborated with "Catalonia" (edited in Buenos Aires) and directed "Germanor" (Brothehood) (edited in Chile). He set up the collection "The pine of the three branches" along Xavier Benguerel.

=== Resistance and transition ===
In 1948 Joan Oliver came back to Barcelona, where Franco's regime was characterized by authoritarianism and repression. He was imprisoned for three months in the Model prison of Barcelona. Three years later he received the Prize of the French Republic President in the floral games of Paris, for the translation into Catalan of The Misanthrope by Molière. He translated and adapted works of several authors - for example Anton Chekhov. In 1960 his more emblematic work appeared: Vacances Pagades (Paid Holidays). It is a skeptical work, sarcastic too, where a great appointment with the social and political reality of the country is shown. Oliver makes an acid crictisim to the capitalism, the consumer society and the Franco dictatorship. With the death of the dictator and democracy entry, he was especially displeased with the dominant politicians, denouncing the betrayal that meant the transition. In year 1982 he rejected the Creu de Sant Jordi award. He became an uncomfortable character for the politicians, who was necessary to corner. Nothing of all this, however, prevented him from being considered one of the five best Catalan poets of the 20th century. In 1986 he died in Barcelona and was buried in his natal city, Sabadell.

== Works ==
Creator of various works, his poetry is influenced by realism, with a skeptical tone, and influenced by the effects of the Spanish Civil War and the subsequent family's exile. His narrative style is often marked by irony against established conventions.

=== Plays ===
As a playwright, Oliver helped to make cracks on the Franco's regime to recover the Catalan theater. His most outstanding works in this area were Primera representació [First representation] and Ball robat [Stolen Ball], and D'una drecera [a shortcut] was his attempt to approach to public.

- Gairebé un acte o Joan, Joana i Joanet, 1929 [Almost an Act: or, Joan, Joana, and Joanet]
- Una mena d'orgull, 1931 [A Kind of Pride]
- Cataclisme [Cataclismus], 1935 Barcelona. El Nostre Teatre, 1935 / Barcelona: Randez, 1935.
- El 30 d'abril [April 30], 1935
- Allò que tal vegada s'esdevingué [What Perhaps Has Happened], Barcelona: La Rosa dels Vents, 1936 / Barcelona: Aymà, 1970 / Barcelona: Edicions 62, 1987 / Terrassa: Centre d'Art Dramàtic del Vallès, 1996 / Barcelona: Educaula, 2010.
- Cambrera nova [New Waitress], 1937
- La fam [Hunger], Barcelona: Institució de les Lletres Catalanes, 1938 / Barcelona: Aymà, 1975 / Barcelona: Proa, 2003. released in Barcelona's Teatre Poliorama)
- L'amor deixa el camí ral [Love Leaves the Highroad], 1947
- Quasi un paradís [Almost a Paradise], 1951
- La barca d'Amílcar [Amílcar's Boat], 1958
- Ball robat [Stolen Dance], 1958
- Primera representació [First Representation], 1959
- Tercet en Re [Terzetto in D], El Pont, núm. 13, 1959.
- Tres comèdies [Three Comedies]. Barcelona: Selecta, 1960.
- Noè al port d'Hamburg [Noé in Hamburg's Harbour], 1966.
- Quatre comèdies en un acte [Four Comedies in One Act]. Barcelona: Aymà, 1970.
- Vivalda i l'Àfrica tenebrosa i Cambrera nova [Vivalda, Dark Africa, and New Waitress], 1970.
- El roig i el blau [The Red and the Blue], 1985.
- Trenta d'abril [April Thirtieth], 1987.
- Ball robat de Joan Oliver (i altres) [Stolen Dance by Joan Oliver (and others)]. Barcelona: Edicions 62 / La Caixa, 1995.
- Ball robat [intr. Helena Mesalles]. Barcelona: Proa, 1995 / [intr. Francesc Foguet i Boreu]. Barcelona: Proa, 2005.
- Ball robat seguit d'Escena d'alcova [cur. Lluís Busquets i Garabulosa]. Barcelona: La Magrana, 1996.
- Això guixa, 1999.
- Ària del Diumenge, 1999.

=== Poetry ===
- Les decapitacions [Beheadings]. Sabadell: Contraban, 1934 / Barcelona: Proa, 1978 / Madrid: Bruño, 1993.
- Oda a Barcelona [Ode to Barcelona]. Barcelona: Comissariat de Propaganda, 1936.
- Bestiari [Bestiary]. Barcelona: Departament de Cultura, 1937 / Barcelona: Proa, 1969 (4a ed.) / Barcelona: Edicions 62, 1989.
- Saló de tardor [Autum's exhibition]. Santiago de Chile: El Pi de les Tres Branques, 1947 / Barcelona: Proa, 1983.
- Poesia de Pere Quart [Pere Quart's poetry]. Barcelona: Aymà, 1949.
- Terra de naufragis [Land of shipwrecks]. Barcelona: Proa, 1956.
- Vacances pagades [Paid holidays]. València: Diputació de València, 1961 / Barcelona: Proa, 1972.
- Dotze aiguaforts i un autoretrat de Josep Granyer [Twelve etchings and a portrait of Joseph Granyer]. Barcelona: Monografies de la Rosa Vera, 1962.
- Obra de Pere Quart [Pere Quart's work]. Barcelona: Fontanella, 1963.
- Circumstàncies [Circumstances]. Barcelona: Proa, 1968.
- Quatre mil mots [Four thousand words]. Barcelona: Proa, 1977.
- Poesia empírica. Barcelona: Proa, 1981.
- Poemes escollits. Barcelona: Edicions 62 / La Caixa, 1983.
- Refugi de versos [Empirical poetry]. Barcelona: Proa, 1987.
- Antologia [Anthology]. Barcelona: Proa, 1982 / Barcelona: Barcanova, 1993 / Barcelona: Diputació de Barcelona, 1996.
- Els millors poemes [The best poems]. Barcelona: Columna, 1998
- Pingüí [Penguin] (poesia infantil i juvenil). Barcelona: Cruïlla, 2004.

=== Short stories ===
- Una tragèdia a Lil·liput [A tragedy in Lilliput]. Sabadell: Fundació La Mirada, 1928.
- Contraban [Smuggling]. Barcelona: La Rosa dels Vents, 1937.
- Biografia de Lot i altres proses [Lot's biography and other stories]. Barcelona: Fontanella, 1963 / Barcelona: La Magrana, 1983.
- Dos textos [Two texts]. Barcelona: Cafè Central, 1999.
- Tres contes [Three tales]. Sabadell: Fundació La Mirada, 2002.

=== Translations ===
- Pigmalió, original by Bernard Shaw
- Tot esperant Godot. Original by Samuel Beckett
- El criat de dos amos. Original by Carlo Goldoni
- L'òpera de tres rals. Original by Bertolt Brecht
- Un barret de palla d'Itàlia. Original by Eugène Labiche
- Anònim venecià. Original by Giuseppe Berto
- Ubú, rei. Original by Alfred Jarry
- El misantrop. Original by Molière
- El tartuf. Original by Molière
- El banyut imaginari. Original by Molière
- L'hort dels cirerers. Original by Anton Chekhov

=== Literary criticism and essays ===
- El mestre Fabra [Master Fabra], recordat. Barcelona: [s.n.], 1969.
- Francesc Trabal, recordat. Sabadell: Fundació La Mirada, 1999.
- Notícia biogràfica d'Armand Obiols [Armand Obiols biographical review]. Sabadell: Fundació La Mirada, 1999.
- Pròlegs [Prologues]

=== Discography ===
- L'oriol (Remei Margarit). Barcelona: Edigsa, 1963.
- Romanço del fill de vídua (Els tres tambors). Belter, 1966.
- La croada (Núria Espert). Dins: Poetes Catalans contemporanis. Madrid: Discos Aguilar GDE 10-112, 1966.
- El burgès (Francesc Pi de la Serra). Barcelona: Edigsa, 1967.
- Oda a Barcelona (Núria Espert). Barcelona: Edigsa, 1967.
- Poesia de Pere Quart: dotze poemes dits per l'autor. Barcelona: Edigsa, 1968.
- Cançó lirona / Vaca suïssa (Tricicle). Concèntric, 1970.
- Bestiari (La Trinca). Barcelona: Edigsa, 1972.
- Una vaca amb un vedellet en braços (Raimon). Dins: T'adones, amic?. París: Le Chant du Monde CDX 74523, 1974.
- Corrandes d'exili (Ovidi Montllor). Dins: A Alcoi, 1974.
- Decapitació XII (Ramon Muntaner). Dins: Cròniques, 1977.
- Un ase considera el globus terraqüi (Celdoni Fonoll). Dins: He heretat l'esperança, 1978.
- Assaig de plagi a la taverna (Celdoni Fonoll). Dins: Traginer de cançons, 1981.
- Diversos poemes (Celdoni Fonoll). Dins: Recital 1000, 1984.
- Infants (Joan Manuel Serrat). Dins: Fa 20 anys que tinc 20 anys, 1984.
- Corrandes d'exili (Lluís Llach). Dins: T'estimo. Barcelona: Ariola, 1984.
- Utopia (Miquel Pujadó). Dins: Ambaixador d'enllà, 1990.
- Joan Oliver recita Pere Quart. Barcelona: Audiovisuals de Sarrià, D-133.

=== Complete works ===
- Obres completes de Joan Oliver. Obra poètica [Complete works by Joan Oliver. Poetry's works] Barcelona: Proa, vol. I, 1975. (2a ed. 1999)
- Obres completes de Joan Oliver. Teatre original [Complete works by Joan Oliver. Original plays]. Barcelona: Proa, vol. II, 1977. (2a ed. 1999)
- Obres completes. Versions de teatre [Complete works by Joan Oliver. Plays versions]. Barcelona: Proa, vol. III, 1989.
- Obres completes de Joan Oliver. Narrative works. Barcelona: Proa, vol. IV, 1999.
