= Carles Riba =

Catalan writer and poet

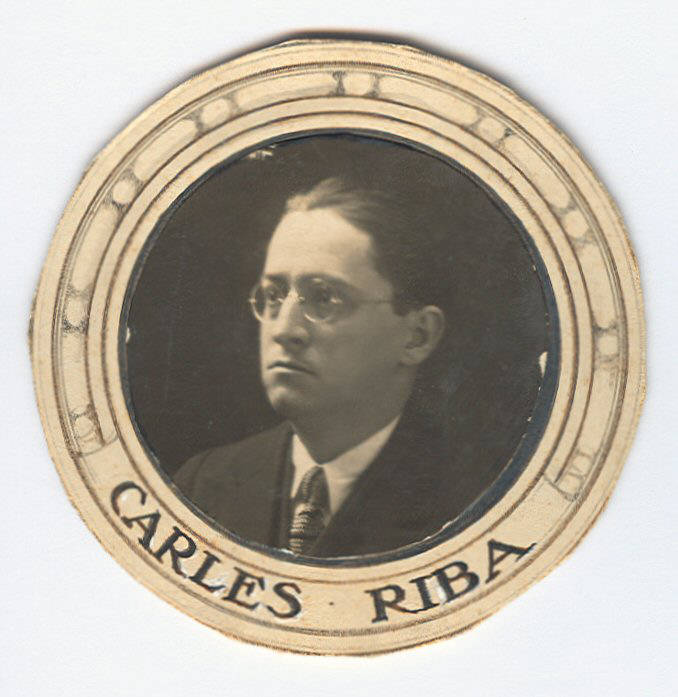
- Carles Riba
- Born: Carles Riba i Bracons; 23 September 1893; Barcelona, Spain
- Died: 12 July 1959 (aged 65); Barcelona, Spain
- Occupation: writer
- Notable work: Bierville Elegies

Carles Riba i Bracons (Catalan pronunciation: [ˈkaɾləz ˈriβə]; 23 September 1893 – 12 July 1959) was a Catalan poet, writer and translator.

He was born in Barcelona and studied Law and Philosophy at the Universitat de Barcelona. In 1916 he married the poet Clementina Arderiu. He worked for a time in the School of Librarianship.

In 1922 he travelled to Munich to study under Karl Vossler. He completed his classical education by travelling to Italy and Greece in the 1920s. Around this time he collaborated with Pompeu Fabra on the General Dictionary of the Catalan Language (Diccionari General de la Llengua Catalana).

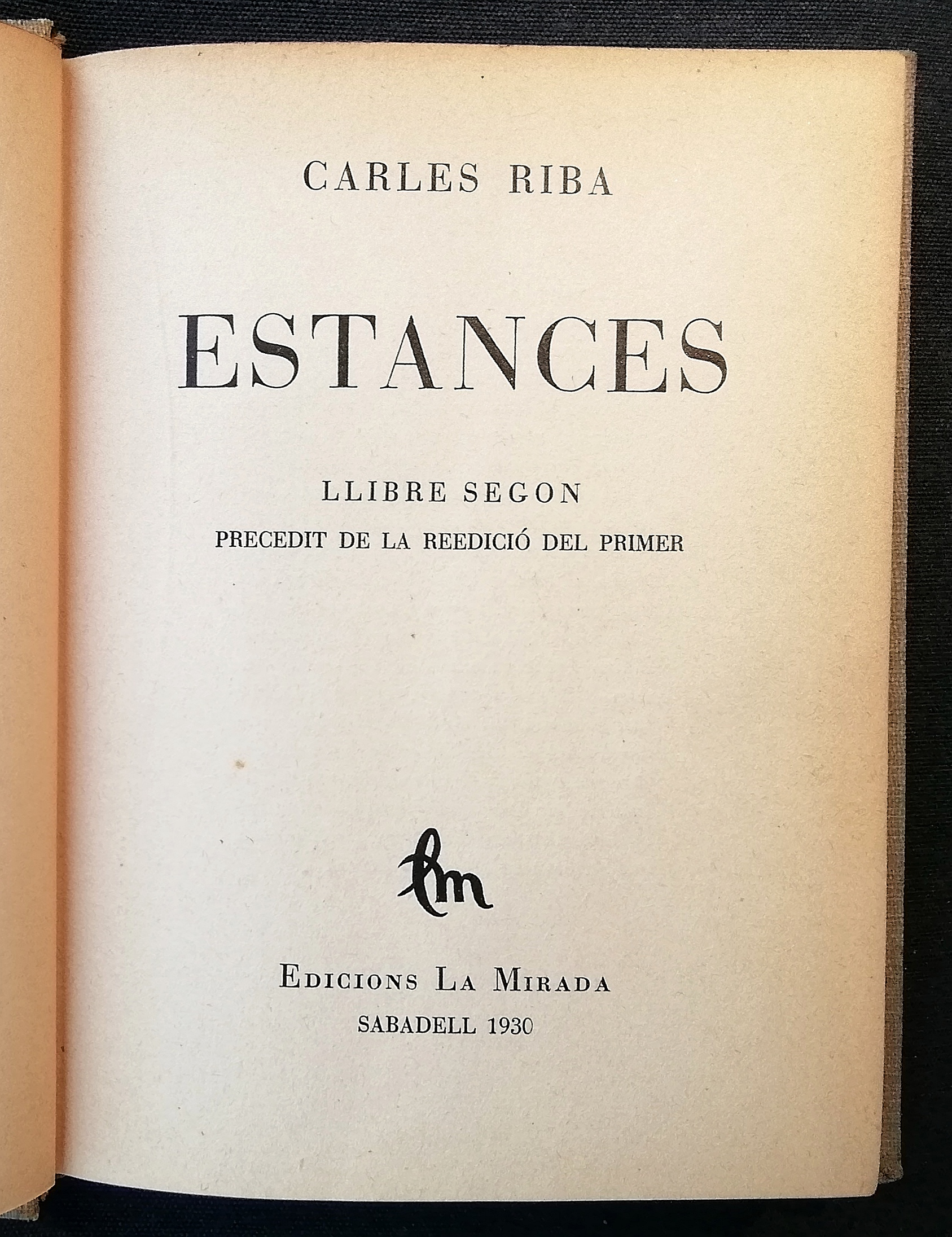
Estances (Rooms), first edition 1930, poemary by Carles Riba

Later he worked in the Bernat Metge Foundation (Fundació Bernat Metge), specializing in classical studies, and became lecturer in Greek at the Universitat Autònoma de Barcelona in 1934.

Because of his association with Republicanism and Catalan nationalism, he was compelled to flee to France, after the victory of Francoist forces at the end of the Spanish Civil War in 1939. He settled in the Château de Roissy, a 17th-century building, which was offered as a refuge for writers.

In 1943 he returned to Barcelona, working on translations from classical authors for the Fundació Bernat Metge, of which he eventually became director.

He wrote poetic works including Estances (1919 and 1930), Bierville Elegies (Les Elegies de Bierville) (1943), Salvatge Cor (1952), Del joc i del foc (1947), and Esbós per a tres oratoris (1957), as well as translations of Constantine Cavafy, Friedrich Hölderlin, Edgar Allan Poe, Rainer Maria Rilke and Franz Kafka, and classical works including Homer's Odyssey, Plutarch's Parallel Lives, and dramas by Sophocles and Euripides into Catalan.

Riba's work has been translated into English by Joan Gili and Pearse Hutchinson.

The famous American critic Harold Bloom included Riba's poetry in his selection of the Western canon.
