= Josep Carner =

Spanish poet, journalist, playwright and translator

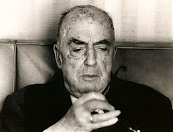
- Born: 9 February 1884
- Died: 4 June 1970 (aged 86)
- Writing career
- Genres: poetry and journalism

Josep Carner i Puigoriol (Catalan pronunciation: [ʒuˈzɛp kəɾˈne]; Barcelona 9 February 1884 – Brussels 4 June 1970), was a Catalan poet, journalist, playwright and translator. He was also known as the Prince of Catalan Poets. He was nominated for the Nobel Prize in Literature seven times.

== Biography ==
In 1897, Carner entered the University of Barcelona, where he studied law and philosophy, and developed an interest in Catalan nationalism. He likewise worked on a number of literary journals, including Montserrat and L'Atlàntida, among others. Carner went on to direct Catalunya2 (from 1903 to 1905), Empori (from 1907 to 1908) and Catalunya (from 1913 to 1914). In 1911, he became a member of the Philological Section of the Institut d'Estudis Catalans (the "Institute of Catalan Studies," akin to a "Royal Academy" for the Catalan language). There he collaborated with another well-known Catalan linguist, Pompeu Fabra, in standardizing and enriching Catalan.

At the beginning of the 20th century, he joined La Veu de Catalunya (The Voice of Catalonia), where he wrote until 1928. In 1915 he married a Chilean, Carmen de Ossa, who died in Lebanon in 1935. They had two children together, Anna Maria and Josep.

Carner was quite innovative in his use of language, in both poetry and prose. He created a new style of political journalism. Along with Prat de la Riba, then president of the Commonwealth of Catalonia, he fought for the professionalization of the Catalan literature, which he considered to be in an "adolescent" stage. After Prat de la Riba's death in 1920, Carner took the civil service examination for the Consular Corps. In March 1921, he began a diplomatic career, and left Catalonia to go to Genoa. Carner settled there with his family as Vice-Consul of Spain. Thereafter he held positions in Genoa, San José, Le Havre, Hendaye, Beirut, Brussels and Paris. During the Spanish Civil War, Carner was one of the few diplomats who remained loyal to the Republic and, therefore, could never return to Spain.

He married a Belgian teacher and literary critic Émilie Noulet; together they set out for a new life in Mexico. Carner lived there from 1939 to 1945, teaching at the Colegio de México. He later moved to Belgium.

A collection of thirty of Carner's poems translated into English by the Irish poet Pearse Hutchinson was published in Oxford by Joan Gili in 1962.

Josep Carner's personal library and archive are held by the Biblioteca de Catalunya.

== Poetry ==
- Llibre dels poetes (1904)
- Primer llibre de sonets (1905)
- Els fruits saborosos (1906)
- Segon llibre de sonets (1907)
- Verger de les galanies (1911)
- Auques i ventalls (1914)
- El cor quiet (1925)
- Nabí (1941)
- Poesia (1957) (compilation). In Poesia there is a section that could be considered a separate book, Absència, with recurrent themes of exile and homeland.

== Plays ==
- El giravolt de maig (1928)
- El Ben Cofat i l'Altre (1951)
- Cop de vent (1966)

== Prose ==
- L'idil·li dels nyanyos (1903)
- La malvestat d'Oriana (1910)

== Articles, stories, word games ==
- Les planetes del verdum (1918)
- Les bonhomies (1925)
- Tres estels i un ròssec (1927)
- The novel Retorn (2017) by Catalan author Carles Casajuana is a fictionalised account of his return to Barcelona the year of his death.
