= Picap =

Spanish record label

PICAP
- Founded: 1984
- Founder: Joan Carles Doval
- Distributor: Actual Records Distribució
- Genre: Various
- Country of origin: Spain
- Location: Castellar del Vallès
- Official website: www.picap.cat

PICAP is a Catalan record label headquartered in Castellar del Vallès, Spain. It was founded in 1984.

== History ==
PICAP supports Catalan authors and performers. While respecting the performer's linguistic expression, it gives preferential support to the Catalan language.

Its debuted as a record label in 1984 with four maxi-singles that appeared simultaneously: the synthpop band Programa, Javier Asensi, pop group Oslo, and hard-rock artist Rockson.

Héctor Vila, Maria-Josep Villarroya, Josep Tero, Gato Pérez, and Joan Soler Boronat were among PICAP's first artists. The first commercial success of the new record label was Catalan humorist Eugenio Jofra Bafalluy.

In the last years of the 1980s, the band Grec, a PICAP artist, joined in a wave of funk music similar to that of other new bands that were starting their careers in those days (such as Duble Buble and N'Gai N'Gai).

The band Sau, after the success achieved on PICAP with Quina nit, signed for a multinational record label. The band Sangtraït, however, stayed with PICAP and prepared its fourth album Contes i llegendes at a time when Catalan rock had reached its peak. Rock and "Cançó" became PICAP's main genres with notable artists in both genres.

In 1991, Lluís Llach joined the record label because of its prestige and trustworthiness, then established ties with Companyia Elèctrica Dharma, Tomeu Penya, Raimon, Maria del Mar Bonet, and Marina Rossell. In 1993, the record company received National Music Awards in Catalonia for their releases. In the late 1990s, the Valencian band Al Tall published with PICAP.

The record company began reissuing CDs of historic Catalan music recordings, including the catalog of EDIGSA. Also included were LPs of artists like Iceberg, Pegasus, Xesco Boix, Grup de Folk, Ara Va de Bo, Jaume Sisa, and Música Dispersa. The recordings came from labels like Als 4 Vents or from the artists themselves, such as Max Sunyer or Santi Arisa.

== Artist roster ==
=== From the catalogues of Edigsa, PDI, and Als 4 vents ===
- Josep Vicenç Foix
- Grau Carol
- Remei Margarit
- Josep Maria Espinàs
- Delfí Abella
- Salvador Escamilla
- Josep Carner
- Salvador Espriu
- Els 4 gats
- Orfeó Lleidatà
- Dodó Escolà
- Francesc Heredero
- Clementina Arderiu
- Marià Manent
- Antoni Ros Marbà
- Coral Sant Jordi
- Carles Riba
- Queta & Teo
- Francesc Pi de la Serra
- Els 4 Z
- Cobla Barcelona
- Catalonia Jazz Quartet
- Duo Ausona
- Maria Cinta
- Germanes Ros
- Picapedrers
- Els Xerracs
- Els Corbs
- Gil Vidal
- Mauné i els seus dinàmics
- Quartet vocal Clara Schumann
- L’esquitx
- Jovelyne Jocya
- Jacinta
- Jeannette Ramsay
- Joe Martin
- Orfeó Enric Morera
- Brenner's folk
- Dos + un
- Núria Espert
- Miquelina Lladó
- Salomé
- Cor Madrigal
- Marian Albero
- Núria Feliu
- Pere Quart
- Joan Manuel Serrat
- Albert Vidal
- Isidor
- Eddie Lee Mattison
- Pere i Joan Francesc
- Maria Pilar
- Jordi Fàbregas
- Miró Casabella
- El grup de 3
- Elisa Serna
- Maria e Xavier
- Xoan Rubia
- Els Consellers
- Jaume Arnella
- Teresa Rebull
- Agustí Bartra
- Falsterbo 3
- Gualberto
- Quilapayún
- Guillermina Motta
- Maquina (person)
- Tapi
- Ara va de bo
- Enric Barbat
- Orquestra Simfònica de Barcelona
- Grup de folk
- Jei Noguerol
- Tapiman
- OM
- Jarka
- Vicent Torrent
- Jordi Soler
- Hamster
- Miquel Cors
- Guima & Shabbath
- Enric Barbat
- Peter Roar
- Esquirols
- Daniel Viglietti
- Dolors Laffitte
- Maria Laffitte
- Toti Soler
- Joan Baptista Humet
- Els Sapastres
- Orquestra Mirasol
- Jordi Sabatés
- Iceberg
- Barcelona Traction
- Ovidi Montllor
- Al Tall
- Quintín Cabrera
- Ramon Muntaner
- Blay Tritono
- Música Urbana
- Secta Sònica
- Companyia Elèctrica Dharma
- Francisco Curto
- Oriol Tramvia
- Mirasol Colores
- Rafael Subirachs
- Badabadoc
- Xesco Boix
- Colla Jacomet
- Josep Tarradellas
- Josiana
- Cobla Selvatana
- Jordi Farràs
- Aguaviva
- Jazzom
- La Alegre Banda
- Melodrama
- Doberman
- Los Auténticos
- Liquid Car
- Cathy
- Víctor Manuel Muñoz
- Canela
- Orquestra Català
- Lluís el Sifoner
- Alejandro Jean
- Lluciana Sari
- Sausalito
- Orquestra Pasapoga
- Huapacha Combo
- Pernil Latino
- Curroplastic
- Pegasus
- Teverano
- Suck Electrònic
- Carraixet
- Programa
- Julio Alberto y Carmen
- Tet i Àlex
- Tango?
- Santi Vendrell
- Cobla Mediterrània
- Burning
- Cobla Miramar
- Deneb
- Gato Pérez
- Astrolabio
- Orquestrina Galana
- Grup Gavina
- Orquestra Plateria
- Xavier Cugat
- El sac de danses
- Albert Pla
- Peret
- Ia Clua
- Jordi Batiste
- Los Sírex
- Lluís Llach
- Tete Montoliu
- Pere Tapias
- Esqueixada Sniff

=== From the catalogue of Picap ===
- Rockson
- Oslo
- Hèctor Vila
- Programa
- Maria del Mar Bonet
- Grec
- La Madam
- La Murga
- Han
- Grup Terra Endins
- Maria-Josep Villarroya
- Quilapayún
- Manel Camp
- Tradivàrius
- Ambtainer
- Fuck off
- Disseny
- Max Sunyer
- Sangtraït
- Paco Muñoz
- Eugenio
- Sau
- Pixamandurries
- Tancat per defunció
- Josep Tero
- Manzano
- Parking
- Jaque al rey
- Ja t'ho diré
- Companyia Elèctrica Dharma
- Santi Arisa
- i-6
- Nakki
- Terratrèmol
- Tots sants
- Zoo il·lògics
- Orquestra Maravella
- Salzburg
- Fora des sembrat
- La Fosca
- Bitayna
- Marc Durandeau
- Quercus Suber
- Miquel del Roig
- Modest Moreno
- Gema 4
- Jose Angel Navarro
- Nats
- Rovell d’ou
- Arizona Baby
- Sui Generis
- Santi Arisa
- Port Bo
- Empordà Fusió
- Tomeu Penya
- Alius
- Tela Marinera
- Lliris
- Tralla
- Carles Cases
- El Cimarrón
- Marina Rossell
- Quars
- Pep Sala & La banda del bar
- Roger Mas
- La Rural Company
- Sílvia Comes
- Lídia Pujol
- Dyango
- Adirà Puntí
- Ramoncín
- Loquillo
- Pastora
- Mariona Comellas
- Mar Endins
- Bluestereo
- Los Amaya
- Cobla De Cambra de Catalunya
- Pa d’angel
- Xató
- The Companys
- Túrnez & Sesé
- Keympa
- Ginesa Ortega
- Rockness
- Inèdits
- Entregirats
- Muhel
- Victor Gioconda
- Naltrus
- Narcís Perich
- Outsider
- Inti Illimani
- Rafa Xambó
- Aljub
- Ramon Sauló
