= Borja Penalba =

Spanish composer and record producer

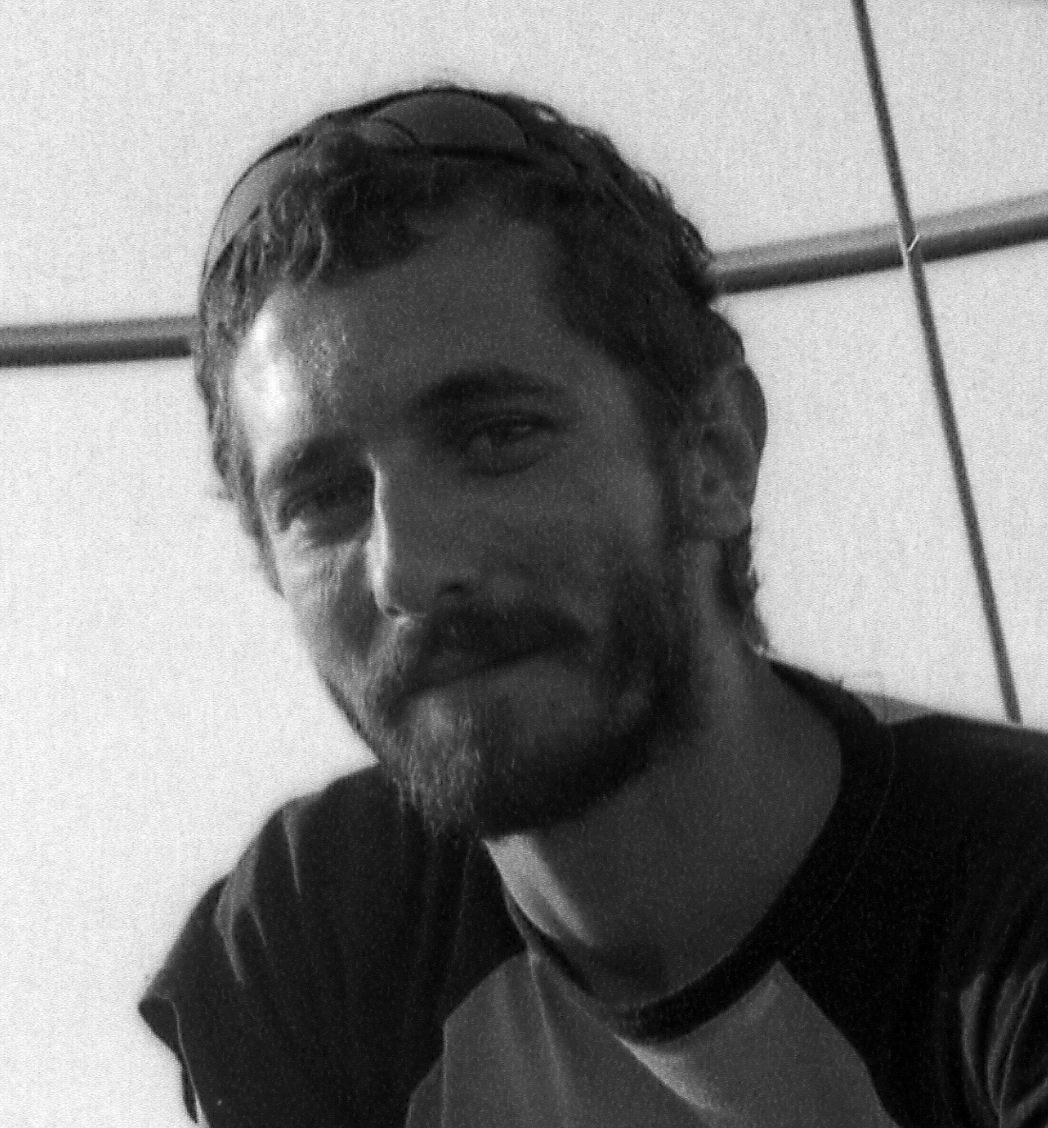
Borja Penalba in 2006

Borja Penalba Catalá (born 1975 in Valencia, Spain) is a composer, record producer, arranger and musician. He has worked with and for, among others, Feliu Ventura, Lluís Llach, Maria del Mar Bonet, Lluís Danés, Obrint Pas, Miquel Gil, Joan Amèric, Marc Parrot, Sílvia Pérez Cruz, Bruno Oro, Albert Pla, Lídia Pujol, Elena Gadel, VerdCel, Aspencat and Andreu Valor. He also was a member of the Valencian rock band Dropo.

== Main works ==
- Original soundtrack for "3D Flames", the first 3D documentary about the Falles of Valencia, directed by Paulí Subirà, released at l'Hemisfèric (Ciutat de les Arts i les Ciències) of València on 27 February 2013.
- Original soundtrack for the documentary film "Interior de Paisatge", directed by Elisenda Trilla. A production by Setmàgic Audiovisual and Televisió de Catalunya.
- Original soundtrack for the documentary film "Enxaneta", directed by Paulí Subirà. A 3D production by TV3. (review:)
- Original soundtrack, together with Lluís Llach, musical director, arranger and live musician for the Lluís Danés' show Llits (Beds)
- Original soundtrack and sound effects for some flashes or visual poems created by Lluís Danés for the cultural TV show Ànima broadcast by the Catalan channel Canal 33
- Original soundtrack and sound effects for the TV Show "Enderrock TV" (by the music magazine Enderrock), under the direction of Lluís Danés
- Original soundtrack and sound effects for the film "El Sueño de Eleanor" (Eleanor's Dream), directed by Lluís Danés. Film especially made for the commemoration of the 60th anniversary of the Universal Declaration of Human Rights. Film premiered at the Museo Nacional Centro de Arte Reina Sofía on 12 December 2008.
- Original soundtrack and sound effects for the exhibition "Immigration, here and now", placed at the Palau Robert in Barcelona, under the art direction of Lluís Danés. November 2008 – June 2009
- Original soundtrack for the documentary film "Homo Baby Boom", directed by Anna Boluda
- Original soundtrack for the promotional Spot directed by Anna Boluda for the IYA2009 (International Year of Astronomy 2009)
- Musical director, arranger and musician for the "Sopar dels XXXVI Premis Octubre", under the direction of Lluís Danés, and performed in Valencia on 27 October 2007 (Review: )
- Music Producer and live musician (producer, guitar and accordion) for the show "Tranuites Circus", directed by Lluís Danés, and performed at the Teatre Nacional de Catalunya in January 2007.
- Co-director/music producer, arranger, musician and co-author of the Original Soundtrack composed by Lluís Llach for the film "Salvador", directed by Manuel Huerga.
- Usual Guitar and Accordion live player for Feliu Ventura.
- Since May 2011, member of the band for Bruno Oro as a multi-instrumentalist
- During 2010, Plays at the 50NC show by Marc Parrot as a multi-instrumentalist

== Discography ==
'CDs/DVDs like composer (C), producer (P), arranger (A) and/or musician (M)':

- Giròvag: Suite de Parlavà (Bureo Músiques - Sota la palmera records, 2026) (C-P-A-M)
- Giròvag (Blau-Discmedi, 2024) (C-P-A-M)
- Pell (Acció Cultural del País Valencià / Primavera d'Hivern / Bureo Músiques, 2021) (P-A-M)
- L'Ovidi se'n va a la Beckett (Sembra Llibres i Propaganda pel fet!, 2021)[4] (C-P-A-M)
- Maria del Mar Bonet amb Borja Penalba, de Maria del Mar Bonet i Borja Penalba - Discmedi/Blau, 2020 (C-P-A-M)[5]
- Cançons de fer camí, de Mireia Vives i Borja Penalba - Bureo, 2019 (C-P-A-M)[6]
- Convocatòria, de Feliu Ventura - Propaganda pel fet!, 2019 (P-A-M)
- Geometries, de Miquel Gil - Temps Record, 2019 (C-P-A-M)
- Cuidados violentos, de Fran Yera - Autoedició, 2019 (P-A-M)
- Línies en el cel elèctric, de Mireia Vives i Borja Penalba - Mésdemil, 2017 (C-P-A-M)
- L'amor fora de mapa, de Mireia Vives i Borja Penalba - Mésdemil, 2016 (C-P-A-M)
- Cançó "Senso", lletra de Manel Alonso, música de Borja Penalba, interpretada per Andreu Valor i Borja Penalba. (C-P-A-M). Àlbum: Després vingué la música - Bureo Músiques, 2015
- Estellés, de mà en mà, llibre-disc antologia de Francesc Anyó i Borja Penalba - Onada Edicions i De mà en mà Produccions, 2014 (C-P-A-M)
- Dones i Dons de Tomàs de los Santos + Borja Penalba - Autoedició, 2014 (C-P-A-M)
- Vers l'infinit de Feliu Ventura - Propaganda pel fet!, 2013 (C-A-M)
- "A l'ombra de l'obscuritat" d'Andreu Valor – Autoedition, 2012 (M)
- "Directament" de Joan Amèric – Temps Record, 2012 (P-A-M)
- "Música i Lletra" by Feliu Ventura – Propaganda pel Fet, 2011 (C-P-A-M)
- "Homo Baby Boom" – DVD of the documentary directed by Anna Boluda – Associació de Famílies Lesbianes i Gais, 2008 (C-P-A-M)
- "Sàmara" by Verdcel – Propaganda pel Fet, 2008 (P-A-M)
- "Eixos" by Miquel Gil – Temps Record, 2007 (P-A-M)
- "Tranuites Circus" – DVD of the show directed by Lluís Danés, with original music by Lluís Llach – Mediapro, 2007 (P-A-M)
- "BSO Salvador(Puig Antich)" by Lluís Llach – BMG, 2006 (C-P-A-M)
- "Alfabets de Futur" by Feliu Ventura – Propaganda pel Fet, 2006 (C-P-A-M)
- "Que no s'apague la llum" by Lluís Llach & Feliu Ventura – Propaganda pel Fet, 2005 (C-P-A-M)
- "En moviment" by Obrint Pas – Propaganda pel Fet, 2005 (A-M)
- "La Flama" by Obrint Pas – Propaganda pel Fet, 2004 (A-M)
- "Novi-novi" by Kuami Mensah Autoedició, 2004 (P)
- "25 años haciendo el imbécil" by Los Inhumanos – Filmax Music, 2004 (M)
- "Las Canciones de la afición del Levante U.D." Various artists – Sold with the newspaper Levante of Valencia, 2004 (C-A-M)
- "Barricades de paper" by Feliu Ventura – Propaganda pel Fet, 2003 (C-P-A-M)
- "Terra" by Obrint Pas – Propaganda pel Fet, 2003 (A-M)
- "Sentit" by Néstor Mont – - Cambra Records, 2003 (M)
- "Capítulo II" by La Banda del Capitán Canalla – Vale Music, 2003 (A-M)
- "Capítulo I" by La Banda del Capitán Canalla – Vale Music, 2001 (A-M)
- "La velleta centenària" by Dropo – Cambra Records, 1997 (C-P-A-M)

'Collaborations/Included songs in CDs/DVDs like a producer (P), arranger (A) and/or musician (M)':

- Song: "Cap motiu" d'Atzembla, performed by Atzembla (A-M)

Album: "El teu viatge" – CC By-Nc-Sa 3.0 2012

- Song: "Està plovent" d'Els Pets, performed by Feliu Ventura (P-A-M)

Album: "Perversions" – RGB Supports, 2012

- Song: "De Burjassot a tu" d'Atupa, performed by Atupa (P-A-M)

Album: "QuatribaRap" – Mésdemil, 2012

- Song: "Fahrenheit 451" de Malnom, performed by Malnom (M)

Album: "Voltors" – Bureo Músiques, 2012

- Song: "L'Herència" d'Aspencat, performed by Feliu Ventura & Xavi Sarrià (P-A-M)

Album: "Inèdit" – CC By-Nc-Sa 2012

- Song: "Prop dels estels" by Steve Miller Band, performed by Beth (A-M)

Album: Disc de la Marató 2010

- Song: "Begging the waves" by Lidia Pujol, performed by Lidia Pujol (M)

Album: Single "Begging the waves"

- Song: "Quina calitja" by La Gossa Sorda, performed by La Gossa Sorda (M)

Album: Saó – Producciones Malditas, 2008

- Songs: "La samarreta" and "Tot explota bé pel cap o per la pota" by Ovidi Montllor, performed by Feliu Ventura (A-M)

Album: L'Ovidi se'n va a Palau – Propaganda pel Fet, 2008

- Song: "Balada d'En Jordi Roca" by Guillem d'Efak, performed by Biel Mesquida (M)

Album: L'Ovidi se'n va a Palau – Propaganda pel Fet, 2008

- Song: "Perquè vull" by Ovidi Montllor, performed by Al Tall (M)

Album: L'Ovidi se'n va a Palau – Propaganda pel Fet, 2008

- Song: "La Muixeranga" (popular), performed by Miquel Gironés (Obrint Pas), Tòbal Rentero (Miquel Gil and other) (A-M)

Album: L'Ovidi se'n va a Palau – Propaganda pel Fet, 2008

- Songs: Fragmento de "Corrandes d'exili" and "Serà un dia que durarà anys" by Ovidi Montllor, performed by Obrint Pas (M)

Album: L'Ovidi se'n va a Palau – Propaganda pel Fet, 2008

- Song: "La casa que vull" by Lluís Llach, performed by Miquel Gil (P-A-M)

Album: Homenatge a Lluís Llach. Si véns amb mi – Picap, 2007

- Song: "He vist un estel" by Feliu Ventura, performed by Miriam Gimeno and Claudi Penalba (P-A-M)

Album: Altres cançons de Nadal 4 – Música Global, 2007

- Song: "Rumba del Nord" by La Carrau, performed by La Carrau (M)

Album: Dins La Taifa – Propaganda pel Fet, 2007

- Song: "I si canto trist" by Lluís Llach, performed by Lluís Llach and Miquel Gil, (this song appears at the final credits form the film Salvador) (P-A-M)

Album: "BSO Salvador(Puig Antich)" – BMG, 2006

- Song: "El Drapaire" by Joan Manuel Serrat, performed by Miquel Gil (P-A-M)

Album: Per al meu amic... Serrat – Discmedi, 2006

- Song: "La diplomàcia de la rebel·lia" by Brams, performed by Feliu Ventura (A-M)

Album: Sempre més – Discmedi, 2005

- Song: "L'última fada" by Cesc Freixas performed by Cesc Freixas amb Els Altres Bandais, with the collaboration of Feliu Ventura (M)

Album: Set voltes rebel, Bullanga Records, 2005

== Awards ==
(Awards and nominations given, either directly to Borja Penalba, or to works in which he has been specially involved in

- Award "Joan Trayter" for the Best Music Producer of year 2006, given by the specialized magazine Enderrock. (Review: https://web.archive.org/web/20110707152103/http://www.apecat.com/v1/news.php?nID=347&language=es&osCsid=c539212c7cf45e4831a8c29627fd9d71])
- V Premis Barcelona de Cinema – Award for the "Best Music", given to the soundtrack of the film Salvador(Puig Antich).
- World Music Charts Europe – 16th place for the record "Eixos" by Miquel Gil at the best Worldmusic albums chart edited in Europe in 2007.
- "XXI Premios Goya" – Nomination for "Best Original Music" for the soundtrack of the film Salvador(Puig Antich).
- "XI Premios de la Música" – Nomination for the "Best Album of Film Soundtrack" for the soundtrack album of the film Salvador(Puig Antich).
- "XVI Premis Butaca" 2010 – Nomination for the "Butaca a la millor composició musical" for the show Beds
- "IV Certamen Terra i Cultura" – "Miquel Martí i Pol" Award to the best music for a poetry wrote in Catalan, granted to Tomàs de los Santos (Review: )
- Awards "Barnasants" to the best live performance (Joan Amèric). 17th edition BarnaSants – 2012

Awards Ovidi Montllor of Valencian Music:

- 2007 Edition: Best song – “Alacant –per interior-” (Feliu Ventura)
- 2008 Edition: Best Folk Album – "Eixos" (Miquel Gil)
- 2012 Edition: Best Songwriter Album – "Música i lletra" (Feliu Ventura)

Enderrock Awards (People's Choice Award):

2005

- Best band of Singer-Songwriter' Songs of the Year Lluís Llach & Feliu Ventura
- Best Album of Singer-Songwriter' Songs of the Year "Que no s'apague la llum" (Lluís Llach & Feliu Ventura)
- Best Song of Singer-Songwriter' Songs of the Year "Que no s'apague la llum" (Feliu Ventura & Borja Penalba)
- Best Live Performance of Singer-Songwriter' Songs of the Year Lluís Llach & Feliu Ventura

2006

- Best Album of Singer-Songwriter' Songs of the Year "Alfabets de futur" (Feliu Ventura) (Propaganda pel Fet)
- Best Live Performance of Singer-Songwriter' Songs of the Year Feliu Ventura (L’Auditori )
- Best Song of Singer-Songwriter' Songs of the Year "Alacant –per interior" (Feliu Ventura)
