= Ramon Sauló =

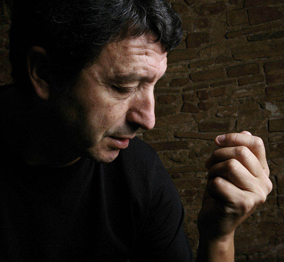
Ramon Sauló.

Jordi Sauló (born 12 February 1954) is a singer and graphic designer from Catalonia.

== Biography ==
Sauló was born in Cerdanyola del Vallès. His first public performance was in 1971 in the theater of Sabadell La Faràndula, during a festival of "Cançó" presented by Salvador Escamilla. Sauló shared the list of acts with Guillem d'Efak, Pere Tàpies, Ramon Muntaner, Joan Isaac and Victorí.

In 1973, Sauló won second prize in a singing competition in Sabadell, and first prize in the “Promoció de Noves Veus” (Promotion of New Voices) competition in La Cova del Drac. This victory led to the publishing of his first record with CBS in 1976. The record was a single, containing his songs "Bona nit" (Good Night) and "En un racó del meu cos" (Somewhere in my body).

Sauló has also acted in Sis Hores de Cançó (Six hours of song) in Perpignan, the preface of Sis Hores in Canet, at the Palau dels Esports de Barcelona and appeared in television programs on Circuit Català TVE (Catalan Circuit of Spanish TV). He was regularly accompanied by pianist Joan Bertran and guitarist Feliu Gasull.

Sauló ceased performing in the late 1970s and became a graphic designer. He resumed his music career three decades later, releasing an album of six of his old repertoire songs and five new pieces. Sauló was accompanied by guitarist and composer Toni Xuclà. The album, Som així.... was released through Picap in 2008. He released his follow up album Descobrint camins in 2011.

== Discography ==
- Bona nit (1976)
- Som així... (2008)
- Descobrint camins (2011)
