= Dying Beyond Their Means =

- Theatrical release poster
- Spanish: Murieron por encima de sus posibilidades
- Directed by: Isaki Lacuesta
- Screenplay by: Isaki Lacuesta
- Starring: Raúl Arévalo; Imanol Arias; Bruno Bergonzini; Àlex Brendemühl; Jose Coronado; Eduard Fernández; Ariadna Gil; Bárbara Lennie; Sergi López; Carmen Machi; Ángela Molina; Àlex Monner; Albert Pla; José María Pou; José Sacristán; Emma Suárez; Luis Tosar; Ivan Telefunken; Jordi Vilches; Julián Villagrán
- Cinematography: Diego Dussuel; Marc Gómez del Moral
- Edited by: Domi Parra
- Music by: Judit Farrés; Albert Pla
- Production companies: La Panda de Morosos; Alicorn Films; La Termita Films; Sentido Films; Versus Entertainment
- Distributed by: Versus Entertainment
- Release dates: 25 September 2014 (Zinemaldia); 24 April 2015 (Spain)
- Country: Spain
- Language: Spanish

Dying Beyond Their Means (Spanish: Murieron por encima de sus posibilidades) is a 2014 Spanish satirical comedy film written and directed by Isaki Lacuesta. It features an ensemble cast.

== Plot ==
Upon being interned in a psychiatric hospital, five citizens whose lives were thwarted by economic crisis concoct a plan to kidnap the president of the Central Bank to get things back to the way they used to be.

== Cast ==
- Raúl Arévalo as Miguel
- Julián Villagrán as Julio
- Iván Telefunken as Iván
- José Coronado as José Javier
- Albert Pla as Albert
- Josep Maria Pou as Faustino Lorenzo
- Jordi Vilches as Jordi
- Ariadna Gil as directora
- Carmen Machi
- Bárbara Lennie
- José Sacristán
- Ángela Molina as camarera
- Eduard Fernández as locutor de televisión
- Sergi López
- Emma Suárez as Ana
- Imanol Arias
- Bruno Bergonzini
- Àlex Monner
- Pau Riba
- Jaume Sisa
- Luis Tosar

== Production ==
The film is an Alicorn Films, La Termita Films, Sentido Films, Versus Entertainment and La Panda de Morosos production.

== Release ==
The film premiered at the 62nd San Sebastián International Film Festival on 25 September 2014 in a non-competitive slot. Distributed by Versus Entertainment, it was released theatrically in Spain on 24 April 2015.

== Reception ==
Neil Young of The Hollywood Reporter welcomed the "commendably brave and wildly unexpected career curveball" by Lacuesta with the "cockeyed" comedy film, underscoring as a bottomline that the "tartly topical satire takes wobbly aim at easy targets".

Pere Vall of Fotogramas rated the film 4 out of 5 stars, singling out its "central quintet, its tone swifts, and its mix of humor and pamphlet" as the best things about the film.

Carlos Boyero of El País lamented that, with the film, he felt "directly assaulted by embarrassment, that ungrateful feeling of cringe".

Sergio F. Pinilla of Cinemanía rated the film 4 out of 5 stars, writing that despite the astonished reaction of a part of the critics, "the experiment works" with Lacuesta's irreverent humor managing to [both] surprise and offend.

== See also ==
- List of Spanish films of 2015
