= Feliu Ventura =

Spanish singer-songwriter

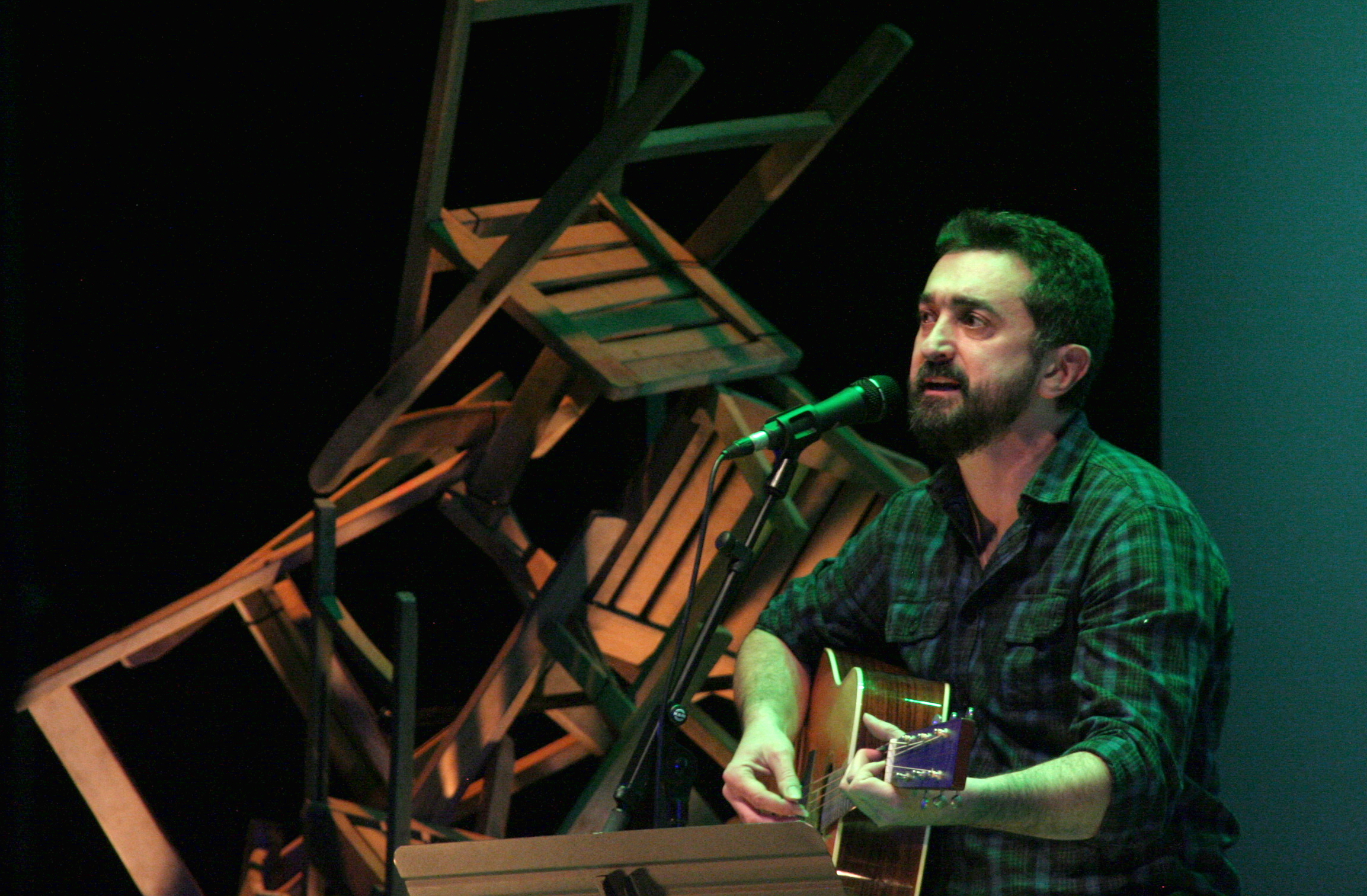
Feliu Ventura in 2016

Feliu Ventura (Xàtiva, 1976) is a Spanish singer-songwriter.

Ventura's music is on the boundary between modern music styles and folk, with lyrics addressing political and youth issues. He has collaborated with guitar player and record producer Borja Penalba, the band Obrint Pas and the Catalan singer-songwriter Lluís Llach.

In voting by the readers of the specialized magazine Enderrock, Ventura won the award for best singer-songwriter of 2006.

== Discography ==
- 1996 – L'única diferència (tape)
- 2000 – Estels de tela (CD)
- 2003 – Barricades de paper (CD)
- 2005 – Que no s'apague la llum (CD/DVD) (Live Recording together with Lluís Llach)
- 2006 – Alfabets de futur (CD)
- 2011 – Musica i Lletra (CD)
