= Maquina =

Maquina may refer to:

- Màquina!, Spanish prog rock band
- La Máquina, the River Plate football team of the early 1940s
- Yank tank
