= Obrint Pas =

Spanish band

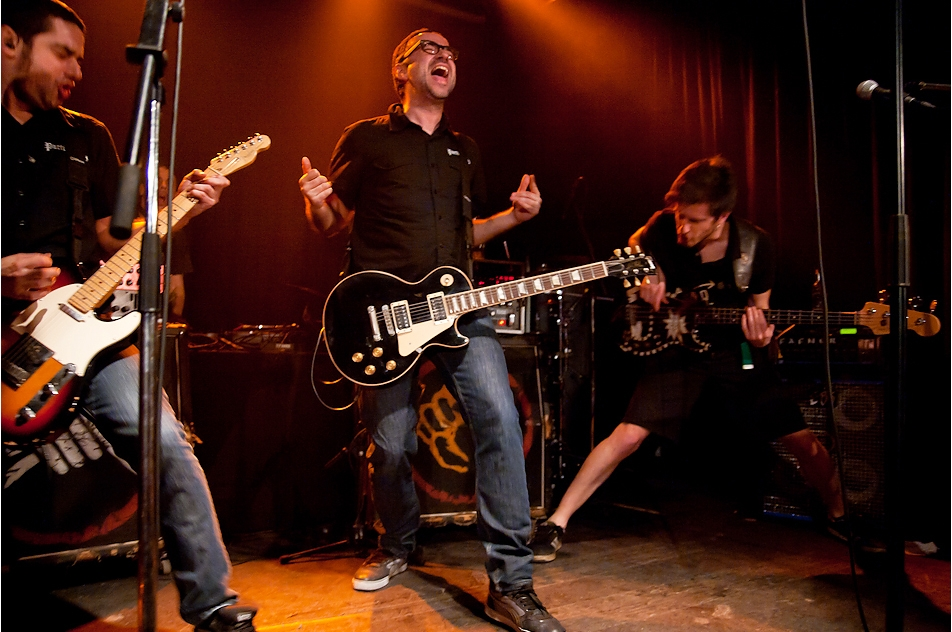
- Obrint Pas at Festsaal Kreuzberg, 2012.

Background information
- Origin: Valencia, Valencian Country, Spain
- Genres: Rock, ska, reggae
- Years active: 1993–2014
- Labels: Propaganda pel Fet
- Members: Xavi Sarrià; Josep Pitarch; Miquel Gironès; Marc Guardiola; Robert Fernández; Miquel Ramos

Obrint Pas (Catalan pronunciation: [oˈbɾim ˈpas], "Breaking Through") was a band from Valencia, Valencian Community. Their music is a mixture of rock, ska, reggae, hardcore punk, and folk. Their songs include traditional instruments—including the Valencian dolçaina—and melodies. Their lyrics often contain themes of protest, solidarity, the territorial unity and independence of the Catalan Countries, promotion of the Catalan language, and the revindication of Valencian culture and traditions. They also consider antifascism and antiracism. Their lyrics, melodies, and political coherence influenced the first generation born after the death of Francisco Franco: the first generation with access to education in the Valencian language.

== History ==
Obrint Pas was formed in 1993. One year later, in 1994 they recorded their first tape which took them to the III Tirant de Rock. During the following years, the band also took part in several festivals that helped them to consolidate their music.

Their first album came in 1997 with the title La revolta de l'ànima. 3 years later, came Obrint Pas (2000), their first album with the record label Propaganda pel Fet. The consolidation of the group came with Terra in 2003, trying new styles. Just a year later, they recorded La Flama (2004) which launched them onto the international scene with gigs in Germany, Switzerland, the Netherlands, Morocco and the Western Sahara.

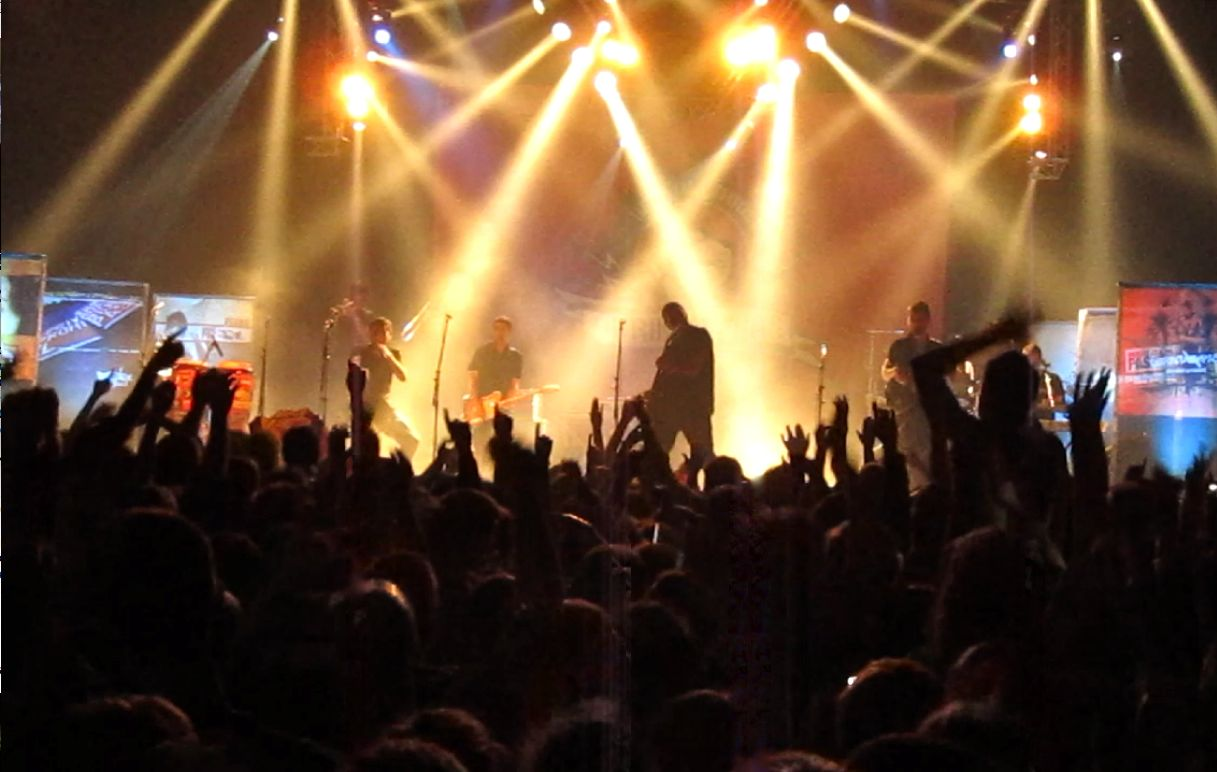
Obrint Pas performing live at a gig for Darréu in Asturias

Their last work En Moviment (2005) is a Live album with many collaborations such as the likes of Alex from Inadaptats, Fermin Muguruza, Al Tall and many more. It was recorded in a tributing gig to Ovidi Montllor in Valencia ten years after his death. This work reached the charts in Spain (The only group singing in Catalan).

=== 2006 Internacionalista Tour onwards ===
In 2006, the band undertook an international tour that was called 2006 Internacionalista Tour and included England, Norway, Czech Republic, and Argentina.

In 2007, the band released their 5th studio album Benvingut al Paradís (Catalan for Welcome to Paradise). The artwork features Muhammad Ali. In the same year, two valencian journalists Antoni Rubio and Hèctor Sanjuan published Del Sud. El País Valencià al ritme dels Obrint Pas. The book is based on the story of the band and the 15 last years of the Valencian region.

=== World record Lipdubbing ===
On 24 October 2010, in the city of Vic, the music of Obrint Pas was used in a world record attempt to get the largest lipdub ever. It succeeded with 5771 participants. The background music used was La flama, a song from 2004.

== Members ==
- Xavi Sarrià - Guitar & vocals
- Jaume Guerra - Bass
- Miquel Gironès - Dolçaina, vocals, drum
- Marc Guardiola - Drum
- Robert Fernández - Guitar
- Miquel Ramos - Vocals & Keyboards

== Discography ==
- La revolta de l'ànima - 1997
- Obrint Pas - 2000
- Terra - 2002
- La flama - 2004
- En Moviment! (Live album) + Un Poble en Moviment! (Live DVD) - 2005
- Benvingut al Paradís (CD) + Assaltant el Paradís (DVD) - 2007
- Coratge (CD and book) - 2011
