= Roger Mas =

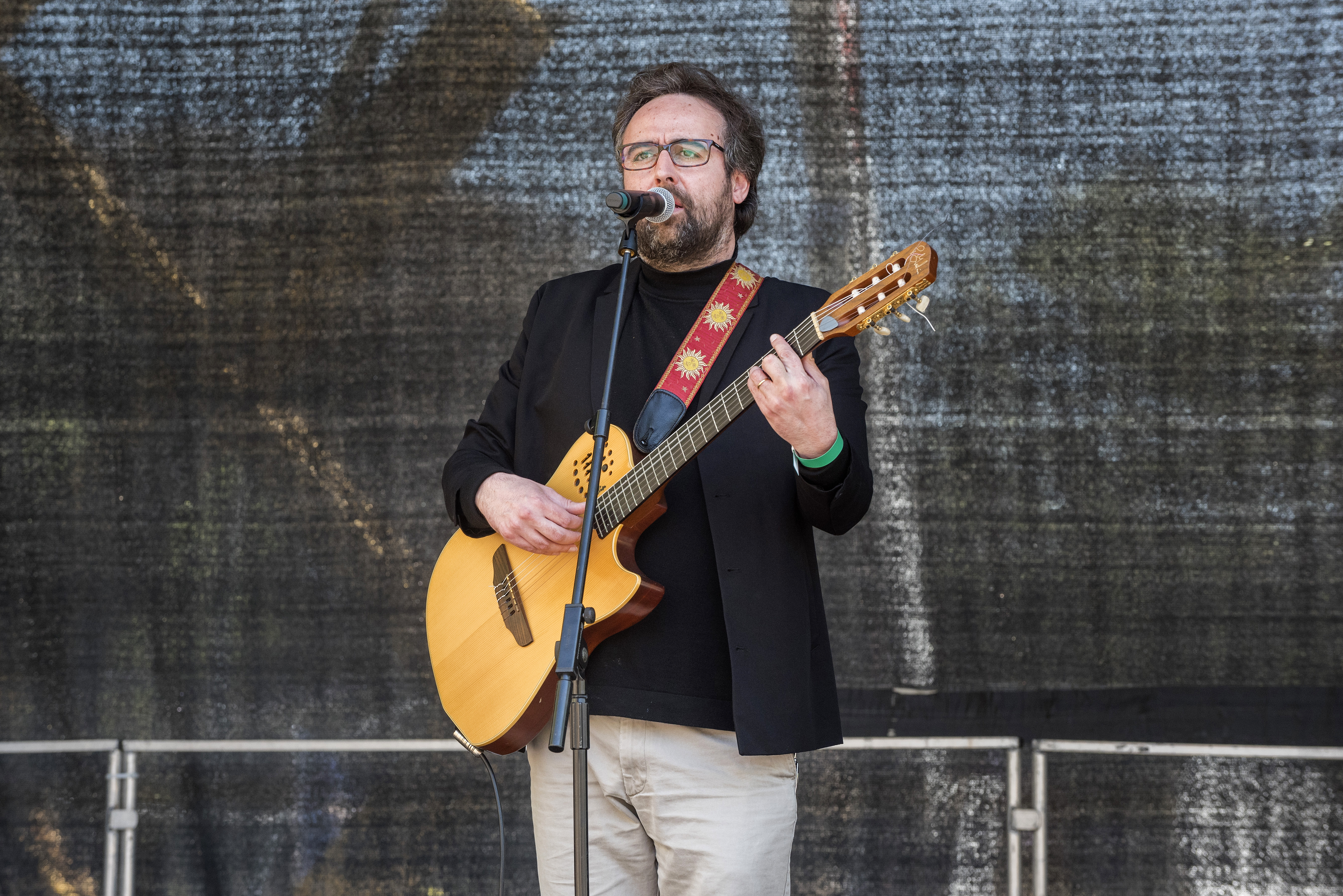
- Roger Mas i Solé

Background information
- Born: Roger Mas i Solé; December 9, 1975 (age 50); Solsona, Lleida, Spain
- Genres: Folk, folk rock, rock, world music
- Occupations: Singer, songwriter, musician, poet
- Instruments: Vocals, guitar, piano
- Years active: 1996 - Present
- Labels: K Industria Cultural, Picap

Roger Mas i Solé (born 1975 in Solsona) is a Catalan singer-songwriter.

== Biography ==
He began studying music and instruments at the age of five under the guidance of his grandfather, Joan Solé i Costa. At the age of twelve, he started his artistic career as a clarinetist and saxophonist. From 1994 onwards, he explored various musical expressions of the world under the mentorship of Luis Paniagua.

In 1996, the Èxit Award from Catalunya Ràdio marked the start of his career as a singer-songwriter. Since then, eleven albums, numerous awards for each new work, and critical acclaim have established him as a prominent figure in Catalan music.

His music is inspired by three pillars: modern sounds, traditional roots, and ancient world music. His lyrics mix street language, literary language, and disappearing dialects. He has been described as “the most beautiful voice ever to emerge from Catalan song” (Mingus B. Formentor, La Vanguardia). In recent years, he has performed in countries such as France, Cuba, Italy, Uruguay, Serbia, the United States, Hungary, and Brazil.

He has received more than twenty awards, and his discography includes Les flors del somni (1997), Casafont (1999), En el camí de les serps i els llangardaixos blaus fluorescents cap a la casa de vidre de la Senyora dels Guants Vermells (2001), dp (2003), Mística domèstica (2005), Les cançons tel·lúriques (2008), A la casa d'enlloc (2010), and Roger Mas i la Cobla Sant Jordi – Ciutat de Barcelona (2012).

In 2013, he won the Rotllana Sardana Award (granted by the Sardana Federation of the Counties of Lleida) for combining modern music with traditional and ancient sounds from around the world, with lyrics blending street language, literary expression, and ancestral forms.

== Discography ==
Year	Title	Label	Awards and recognition
1997	Les flors del somni	Picap	Altaveu Award for Best Song Lyrics (“Llums de colors”)
1999	Casafont	Picap	Cerverí de Girona Award for Best Song Lyrics (“Cor pur”); Enderrock Critics’ Award for Best Singer-songwriter Album (1999); Enderrock Popular Vote Award for Best Singer-songwriter Album (1999)
2001	Roger Mas & Les Flors en el camí de les serps i els llangardaixos blaus cap a la casa de vidre de la Senyora dels Guants Vermells	Picap	Enderrock Critics’ Award for Best Singer-songwriter Album (2001)
2003	dp	K Indústria Cultural	Named Best Album of the Year by AVUI newspaper; Finalist for the VI Puig-Porret Award for Music Journalism of Catalonia (Winner in Singer-songwriter category); Enderrock Critics’ Award for Best Singer-songwriter Album (2003)
2005	Mística domèstica	K Indústria Cultural	ARC Award for Singer-songwriter Category; Altaveu Award for the album Mística domèstica; Enderrock Critics’ Award for Best Catalan Album (2005); Enderrock Critics’ Award for Best Singer-songwriter Album (2005)
2008	Les cançons tel·lúriques	K Indústria Cultural	XI Puig-Porret Award for Music Journalism of Catalonia; Enderrock Critics’ Award for Best Catalan Album (2008); Enderrock Critics’ Award for Best Folk Album (2008); Enderrock Popular Vote Award for Best Folk Live Performance (2008); ARC Award (2009)
2010	A la casa d'enlloc	Satélite K	ARC Award (2010)
2012	Roger Mas i la Cobla Sant Jordi - Ciutat de Barcelona	Sant Jordi Produccions	Martí i Pol Award (2012); Enderrock Critics’ Award for Best Catalan Album (2012); Enderrock Popular Vote Award for Best Folk Album (2012); Enderrock Popular Vote Award for Best Folk Live Performance (2012); Enderrock Popular Vote Award for Best Folk Song (2012) for El dolor de la bellesa; Rotllana Sardana Award (2013)
2015	Irredempt	Satélite K	Enderrock Popular Vote Award for Best Singer-songwriter Song (2015)
2018	Parnàs	Satélite K	
2021	Totes les flors	Satélite K	
2024	Roger Mas i la Cobla Sant Jordi Ciutat de Barcelona · Vol 2	Satélite K	

== Books ==
- Flors, somnis, camins i serps (poems and songs), 1998
- La teulada és oberta i no sé on són les parets (short stories and poetic prose), 2000 — ISBN 8495304104
- Silvae Cataloniae Interioris (photographs by Carles Santana with excerpts from Roger Mas’s songs), CTFC, 2010
- La pell i l'os (biography) by Francesc Bombí-Vilaseca, Satélite K, 2011
- El dolor de la bellesa (songs and autobiographical texts), Empúries, 2017 — ISBN 978-84-16367-93-1
