= Màquina! =

Spanish rock group

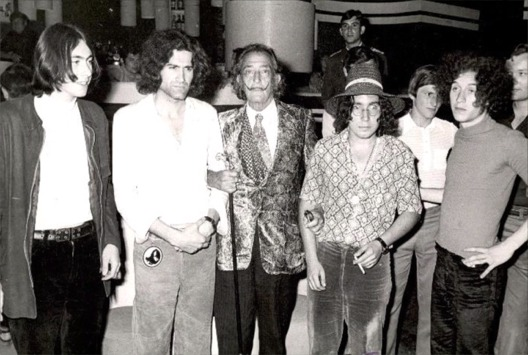
- The band with Salvador Dalí in 1970

Background information
- Also known as: Maquina, Máquina!
- Origin: Barcelona, Catalonia, Spain
- Genres: Progressive rock, psychedelic rock
- Years active: 1969-1972
- Labels: Diabolo, Ariola, Apolo Records, PDI
- Past members: Carles Benavent, Emili Baleriola, Enric Herrera, J. M. Vilaseca, Jordi Batiste, Josep Maria Paris, Lluis Cabanach, Salvador Font

Màquina! (also Máquina!) was a Spanish prog rock and psychedelic rock group from Barcelona. It was formed in 1969 and disbanded in 1972. They were pioneers of progressive rock in Catalonia and Spain and their first album Why? is widely considered one of the most memorable Spanish prog rock albums from the 70s.

== Overview ==
Máquina has its origins as a backing band called La Companyia, SL for singers and groups of the musical folk association Grup de Folk in 1968, collaborating with Jaume Sisa, Pau Riba, Miniatura and others. Grup de Folk disappeared as an association in 1968. After that, two of its members, Jordi Batiste and Enric Herrera, decided to electrify themselves and swap into rock music in 1969.

This group of Catalan youth led by the Batiste-Herrera duo soon became the most prominent and visible heads of the grassroots movement which shook the foundations of the city's musical world at the beginning of the seventies, and which can be considered as the parting shot for progressive rock in Spain.

Their first EP Lands of Perfection was released in August 1969 with Jordi Batiste (bass, lead vocals), Enric Herrera (hammond, piano, back vocals), Luigi Cabanach (guitar, back vocals) and Jackie García (drums). Their second EP, Earth's Daughter, was released at the end of the same year with a new drummer, Tapi Vilaseca.

Why?, their debut album (1970, also known as the "Croissant" LP), is widely regarded in and out of Spain as one of the best records ever to come out of the country. The album is characterized by the use of effects widely popular at the time, such as wah-wah, fuzz, and Hammond organ. Jordi Batiste had to leave the band before finishing the album to join the army in compulsory military service, which in those years lasted around 15 months. Josep Maria París came as his replacement, but it was Luigi Cabanach who got Batiste's role singing and playing bass, while París became the lead guitarist. The only song in which the five musicians play together is the title track; Maquina! was never officially a five-piece band. In September of the same year, Enric Herrera also had to leave the band for military service and Maquina! performed for a period as a trio. Keyboardist Álvaro Is, a friend of París, joined the band to play Herrera's part. In January 1971, Cabanach left the band to do his own military service, leaving them without any of their original members in the line-up. Soon after, Álvaro Is left the band to play in Sweden. Being reduced to two members, París decided to give up the band and return to Sweden as well, where he used to live before joining Maquina! Tapi would then make a new band (Tapiman) to play the gigs previously booked to Maquina.

In early 1971, Enric Herrera, while performing military service, decide to reform the band and try some different styles. The Herrera's new line-up included three teenagers from the band Crac, then abandoning a contract for their own project's debut album. The other members were constantly changing, except the German saxophonist Peter Rohr. Jordi Batiste declined to join the new line-up. They added the new influences of jazz-rock, blues, soul and funk to their style and the four-piece band became an eight-piece with brass players. One of the new members was a 16 years old Carles Benavent. This change was inspired by the success of bands such as Blood, Sweat and Tears and Chicago. Maquina! might also be considered the first jazz-rock band from Catalonia and all of Spain. Their second and final LP, En directo, was recorded as a live concert in July 1972 with the collaboration of founder member Jordi Batiste on vocals.

== Discography ==
- Why? (1970)
- En directo (Live, 1972)
- Funciona (Archival, 1982)
