= Toni Xuclà =

Catalan musician

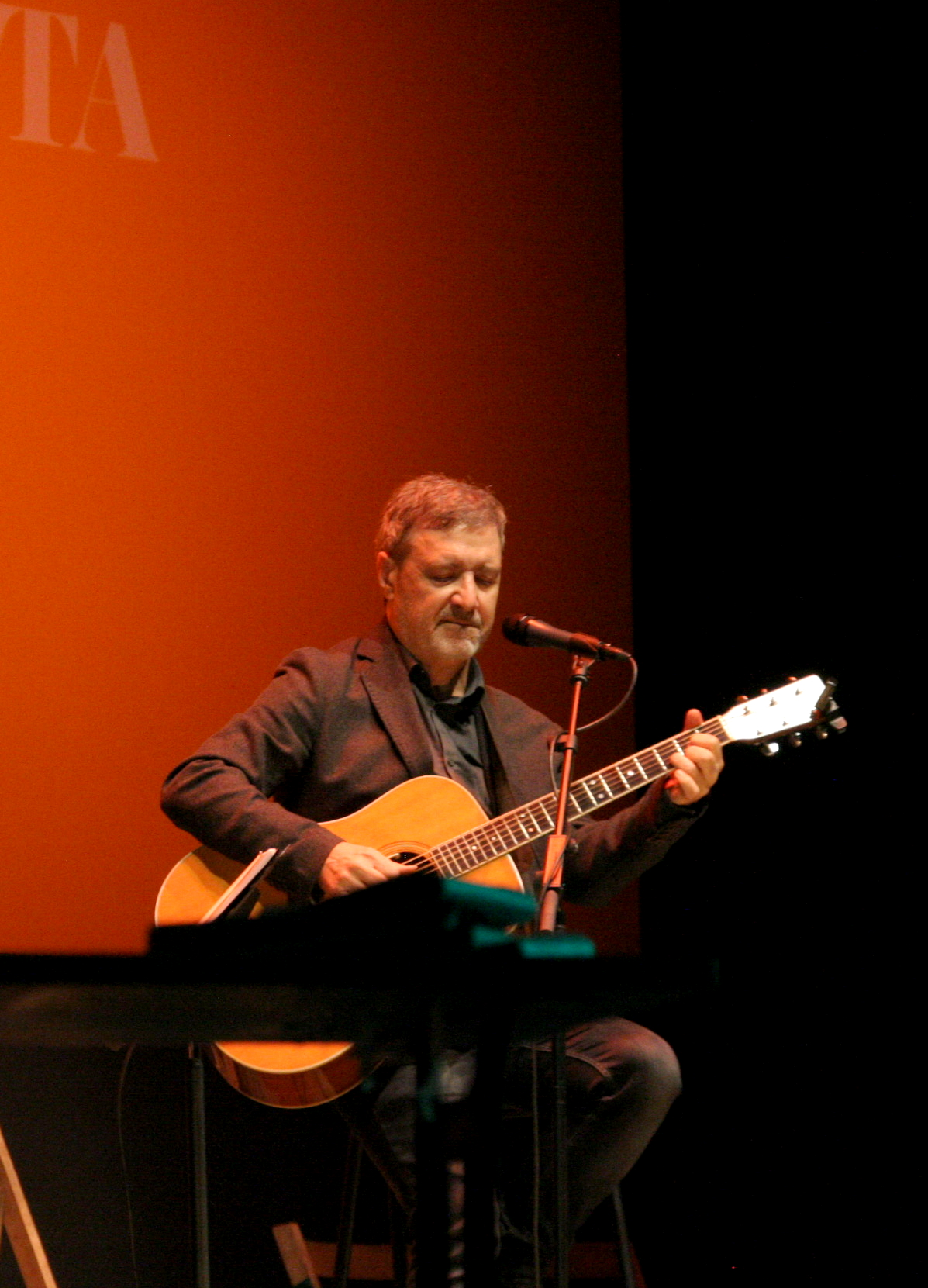
Image of Toni Xuclà

Antoni Xuclà Galindo (born 16 February 1955 in Barcelona) is a Spanish musician. His style has been described as a fusion of contemporary jazz and folk with funk and pop.

== Biography ==
A self-taught musician, by age fifteen Xuclà had composed music for the theater. Early in his career he collaborated with Carles Benavent, Joan Albert Amargós, Toti Soler, and Ovidi Montllor. In 1976 he formed his own band with Santi Arisa and Xavier Batllés, with whom he released his first album, Conte del Mediterràni. During the 1980s and early 1990s he worked primarily as a composer of film, television, and theatrical music. As a conductor he has led the orchestra of the Centre Dramàtic de la Generalitat de Catalunya, conducted a string ensemble during the reception of the Olympic torch in Barcelona, and conducted the orchestra of the Eurovision Song Contest 1997.

Currently, Xuclà is a member of the trio Menaix a Truà, along with Cris Juanico and Juanjo Muñoz.

== Awards ==
- InfArt Prize (1990) for his composition "Tomi i l’estrella blava" ("Tommy and the blue star")
- ALTAVEU Prize (1999)
