= Orquestra Plateria =

Spanish orchestra

- Origin: Barcelona, Spain
- Genres: Popular music, salsa
- Years active: 1974–2014
- Labels: Ariola
- Past members: Manel Joseph and Esther Ambros (vocals and backing vocals); Emilio "Dos manos" Ruíz on piano; Yonder de Jesús Peña on drums and percussion; Carlos Reyes "Compota" on congas and percussion; Ángel Blázquez on bass and backing vocals; Emili Baleriola on guitar; Pep Torres on sax and flute; Sergi Vergés on trombone; David Pastor and Roqui Albero on trumpets; Tchika Fernando on guitar and vocals.

Orquestra Plateria (Spanish: Orquesta Platería) was a Spanish orchestra of popular dance music created in 1974 and active until 2014.

It was formed in the Zeleste club in Barcelona in 1974, in a festive way and with the idea of doing just one performance with dance music from the 40s, 50s and 60s. The idea was to liven up New Year's Eve 1974. Inspired by Jaume Sisa and Manel Joseph, it was played by outstanding musicians such as Gato Pérez, Albert Batiste (ex Tres Tambors, Grup de Folk,...) and Pere Riera, among others.

The success of the "performance" generated a great demand for shows. It participated in the second Canet Rock festival in 1975. The orchestra's first album was recorded in 1978. With the release of the second LP, which includes a version of the song "Pedro Navaja", by Rubén Blades, and versions of Elvis Presley, the Rolling Stones and Pérez Prado, they obtained a Golden Record and a great diffusion throughout Spain. With this album they were the main disseminators of Rubén Blades' song, then hardly known in Spain.

Since then, the Plateria has been a reference of salsa and dance music in Spain, far from the pachanguera verbena prototype. According to the statements of Manel Joseph, its leader:

"When we came out in '74, our thing seemed like a new thing, even though it was old. We were doing a rereading of the music we had lived since we were born, the music our parents had danced to and the music we had danced to at nightclubs. The public identified with us because we dressed the same way, we smoked and drank on stage, politically incorrect things".

Their distinctive feature was that everything they played was their own, it sounded like La Platería, and their ranks included musicians who were experienced in jazz and with a lot of previous experience.

Manel Joseph (1948) (ex Dos+Un) was the singing voice, the director of the orchestra and the only survivor, since its birth, of this veteran orchestra. After the dissolution of the orchestra he followed his path as a singer-songwriter recording some albums. In 2014 the orchestra announced the end as an ensemble with a farewell tour and a traveling exhibition of its forty years of performances.

== Discography ==
- "Orquesta Plateria". Edigsa. 1978.
- "Orquestra Plateria (Pedro Navaja)". BMG Ariola. 1979.
- "Una historia" (directo). Ariola. 1982.
- "Fuego". Ariola. 1982.
- "Cosmopolita". Ariola. 1984.
- "Agárrate". PDI. 1987.
- "Año 13". PDI. 1988.
- "Ballautors". PDI. 1990.
- "Plateria 1975 – 1990" (recopilatorio). PDI. 1990.
- "Ábrete sésamo". PDI. 1990.
- "Veinte años de baile, veinte años de salsa". PDI. 1995.
- "Conga". AZ. 1993.
- "Restos de serie". AZ. 1998.
- "Cobertura total". Gemecs. 1999.
- "Gatísimo". Blanco & Negro. 2002. El título es en homenaje a Gato Pérez.
- "35 Tacos". 2011.
