= Grup de Folk =

Grup de Folk was a Catalan folk music musical association formed in 1967 and disbanded in 1968. Formed as an alternative to Els Setze Jutges, it took its inspiration from the American folk music scene at the time and introduced its styles to local audiences to revive the musical tradition of Catalonia. Among its releases were a pair of albums in 1967 and 1968 that served as the basis for many other groups in the Catalan-speaking areas. It was composed of 26 members, but many were only involved in some of its musical projects. Its many different styles and projects inside the association resulted in an early split-up that later led to the birth of progressive rock and psychedelic rock in Spain with bands such as Màquina!, in which their two co-founders, Jordi Batiste and Enric Herrera, were part of the backing band of Grup de Folk under the name of La Companyia, SL; and Música Dispersa, and singers such as Pau Riba and Jaume Sisa.
