= Marc Parrot =

Parrot

General information
- Type: Two-seat ultralight aircraft
- National origin: Italy
- Manufacturer: Marc-Ingegno di Alberto Marchini Sas

History
- First flight: 4 April 2013

The Marc Parrot, named after the Punta Parrot peak in the Monte Rosa Massif, was specifically designed to fly into unprepared fields and mountain landing strips. The prototype first flew in 2013 but no more had been completed by about 2015.

== Design ==
The Parrot is Marc-Ingegno's first aircraft. Before it they specialized in designing and building aircraft brakes for five or more major aircraft companies. To access the targeted rough and mountain fields, the Parrot needed to provide the pilot with excellent all-round vision, to be able to climb quickly, fly slowly and have an energy absorbing undercarriage with strong brakes.

The Parrot has a high, all-metal, rectangular plan wing fitted with Junkers style flaperons in two sections, the inner ones set slightly down. It is braced to the lower fuselage by a V-form strut on each side. Steel tube extensions of the fuselage frame support the wing centre section which is completely transparent, the spars continuing through it.

The standard engine in the nose of the Parrot is a Rotax 912 UL, uprated from 59.6 kW (79.9 hp) to 89.5 kW (120.0 hp) by the addition of a Marc-Ingegno 0.8 bar (80 kPa; 12 lb/sq in) compressor. The unmodified Rotax is an option. These engines drive propellers with three, scimitar shaped curved blades. There are two 60 L (13 imp gal; 16 US gal) fuel tanks in the wings and a 8 L (1.8 imp gal; 2.1 US gal) reserve tank.

The fuselage has a welded tube steel structure which, aft of the curved, composite surfaces of the cowling and the upper fuselage between engine and cockpit, defines a flat sided form. Between the cockpit and the tail the cross-section is an irregular hexagon. The cockpit seats two in close tandem. It is extensively glazed, with only frame tubes to block the view, and is entered via a starboard side, upward hinged door. On the port side the window is upward hinged; both door and window can be opened in flight. There is a baggage space behind the rear seat and a pannier can be attached to the fuselage underside below the cockpit to increase storage space.

The Parrot's wire-braced empennage is conventional. The vertical surfaces are large, angular and slightly swept. Its horizontal surfaces are rectangular in plan, with a small tailplane carrying a much larger, one-piece elevator hinged well behind the rudder trailing edge. Both rudder and elevator are horn balanced.

The Parrot has conventional landing gear. One each side a sturdy, fixed, forward-raked leg from the fuselage lower longeron has a hinged lower section, normally at about 90° to the upper part, with an axle at its end. A nitrogen/oil shock absorber links the axle to a joint on the lower part of the upper leg. The wheels have large 29 in (740 mm) tyres and caliper hydraulic brakes. The tailwheel is also large, mounted well behind the extreme fuselage in an inverted U frame on a long spring. Skis can be fitted in place of wheels. A Galaxy ballistic recovery parachute is an option.

== Development ==
The Parrot first flew on 4 April 2013 and was first seen in public at the Friedrichshafen airshow at the end of April. It was registered in June 2013 and was active at airshows and fly-ins as recently as June 2015 but remains the only example.

== Specifications ==
Data from Jane's All the World's Aircraft 2016/7

General characteristics

- Crew: One
- Capacity: One passenger
- Length: 6.96 m (22 ft 10 in)
- Wingspan: 9.13 m (29 ft 11 in)
- Height: 2.58 m (8 ft 6 in)
- Wing area: 12.43 m^{2} (133.8 sq ft)
- Empty weight: 312 kg (688 lb)
- Max takeoff weight: 475 kg (1,047 lb) maximum MTOW 560 kg (1,230 lb)
- Fuel capacity: total including reserve 128 L (28 imp gal; 34 US gal)
- Powerplant: 1 × Rotax 912UL supercharged liquid-cooled flat-four, 89.5 kW (120.0 hp)
- Propellers: 3, carbon fibre 'scimitar' form blades-bladed

Performance

- Maximum speed: 198 km/h (123 mph, 107 kn)
- Cruise speed: 165 km/h (103 mph, 89 kn) 75% power
- Stall speed: 50 km/h (31 mph, 27 kn) flaps up, power off. With flaps down 40 km/h (25 mph; 22 kn)
- Never exceed speed: 220 km/h (140 mph, 120 kn)
- Endurance: 7 hr
- Service ceiling: 5,000 m (16,000 ft) service
- g limits: +6/-3
- Rate of climb: 9.15 m/s (1,801 ft/min) at sea level
- Take-off and landing distances: 50 m (160 ft)
