= Tomeu Penya =

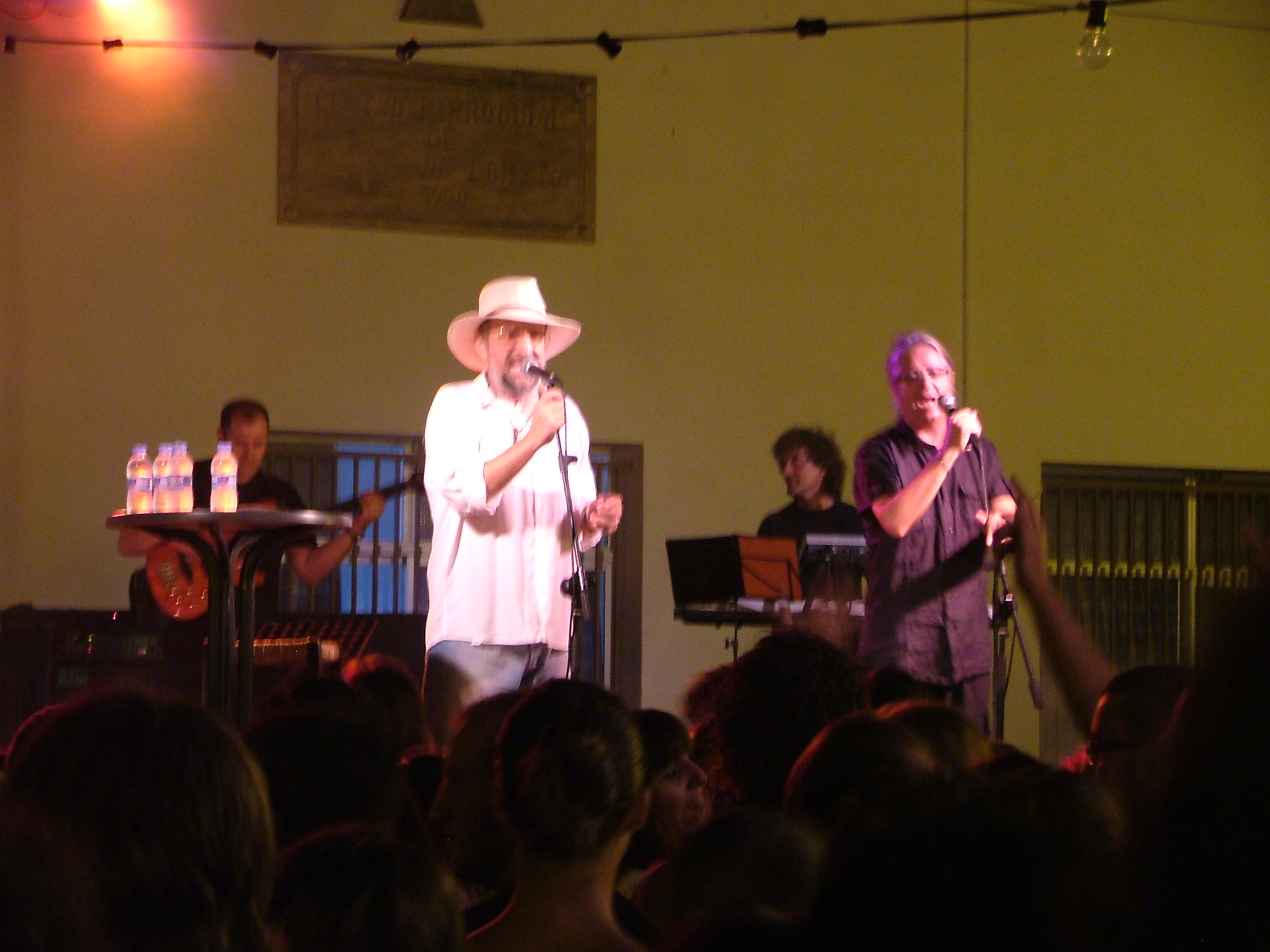
- Tomeu Penya at a concert in Lloret de Vistalegre

Background information
- Born: Bartomeu Nicolau Morlà; 1949 (age 75–76)
- Origin: Majorcan
- Genres: Folk music, rock & roll, country
- Website: https://tomeupenya.wixsite.com/my-site

Bartomeu Nicolau Morlà, known as Tomeu Penya (Balearic Catalan: [toˈmew ˈpəɲə]; born 1949 in Vilafranca de Bonany, Majorca) is a Mallorcan singer-songwriter whose musical work combines Mallorcan folk music, classical rock and roll and country music.

In 1992, he earned the National Prize awarded by the Catalan government for the Sirena album.

== Discography ==
- Tomeu Penya canta a la vila (1980) (descatalogado)
- Càrritx i roses (Blau 1982)
- Coverbos (Blau 1984)
- Illamor (Blau 1985)
- D'amor i Festa (Recopilatorio en cassette, no se editó en LP, descatalogado)
- Mallorquins i catalans (Blau 1986)
- Tomeu (Blau 1987)
- Arrels (Blau 1988)
- Arrels'89 (Blau 1989)
- Els cors ferits (Blau, 1990)
- Sirena (álbum) (Blau, 1992)
- 10 anys d'èxits (Recopilatorio) (Blau, 1992)
- Una aclucada d'ull (Blau, 1994)
- Anuats (Picap, 1995)
- Balades (Recopilatorio) (Blau, 1996)
- De tot cor (Picap, 1997)
- Penya al descobert (Picap, 1998)
- (Recopilatorio) (1999)
- Això és Pecat (Picap 2001)
- Concert al Palau d'Esports de Barcelona (CD+DVD)
- Fàcil (DiscMedi-Blau (2003)
- Sa força d'una mirada (2004)
- Bàsic (Recopilatorio) (2007)
- Paraules que s'endú es vent (2007)
- Tomeu Penya, 30 anys després (acústico en directo, CD+DVD) (2010)
- És per tu (2012)
- Arruix (2013)
- Enamorant-nos (2014) (Recopilatorio con 1 tema nuevo)
- Optimista (2015)
