= Xató =

Sauce in Catalan cooking

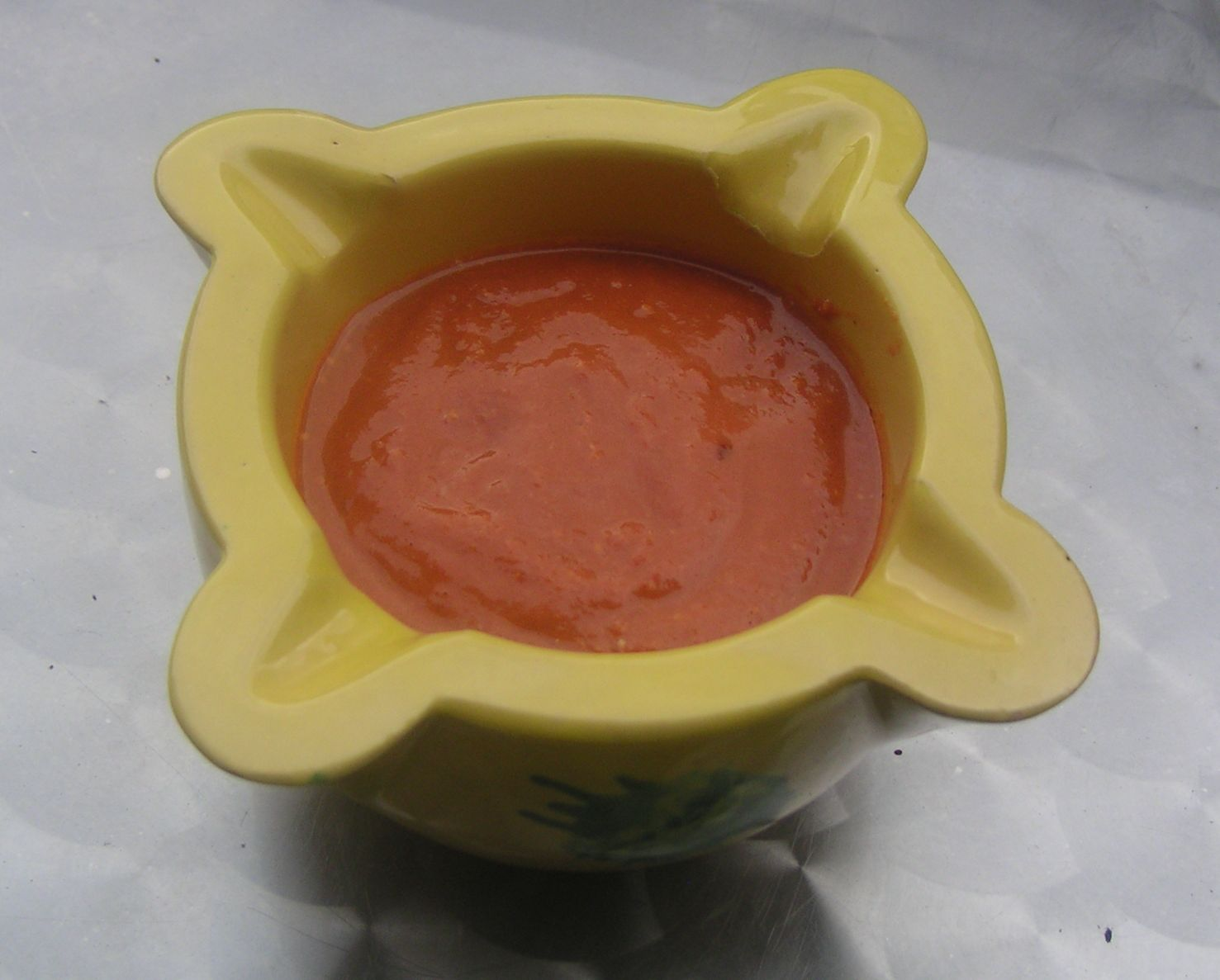
Xató sauce

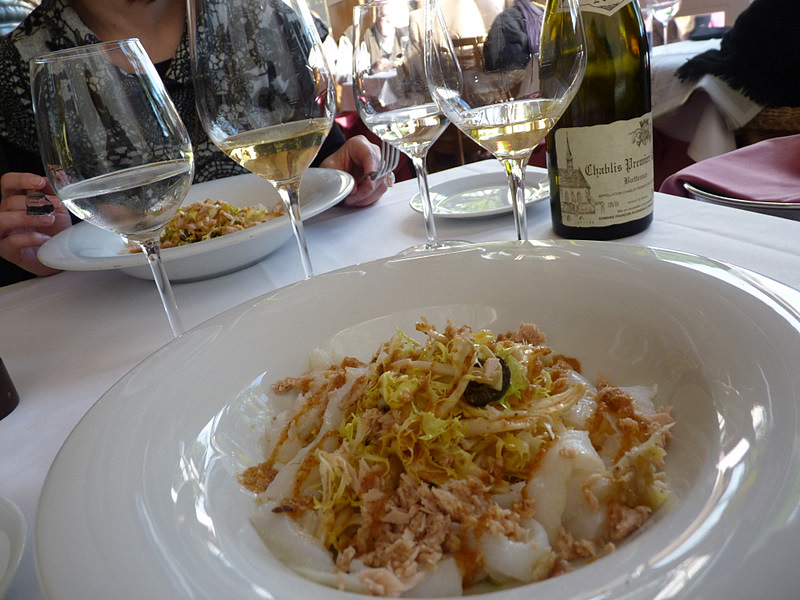
Xató plate

Xató (Catalan pronunciation: [ʃəˈto]) is a typical Catalan dish. It is a sauce made with almonds, hazelnuts, breadcrumbs, vinegar, garlic, olive oil, salt, and the nyora pepper. The sauce is often served with an endive salad prepared with anchovy, tuna and dried and salted cod (bacallà).

The "Xató Route" is formed by the following Catalan towns: Canyelles, Calafell, Cubelles, Cunit, El Vendrell, Sant Pere de Ribes, Sitges and Vilanova i la Geltrú. There is a recipe for each town on the 'Xató route'.

== Catalonia ==
The origin of xató lies in the world of wine. Once the wine was about to be tasted, a fundamental ceremony took place in the whole process that consisted of placing a small tap (l'aixetó) that allowed the wine to come out of the container. This moment marked the beginning of the new wine festival, a celebration that was accompanied by a meal made up of salty ingredients such as fish, which were found in the houses of local farmers and fishermen, served with leaves of the vegetable corresponding to the winter season and salad with a special sauce. This ritual meal that accompanied the ceremony of shaking the wine boot is the origin of the current xató.

In spite of everything, the paternity of this traditional dish in the Penedès and Garraf regions continues to be disputed. Currently, practically all the towns of Gran Panadés have their own variant of the recipe for this dish and the traditional xatonades have become popular in the region, which are popular gatherings in which the participants taste this dish.

== Ambassador of Xató ==
- 1998-1999 : Ferran Adrià
- 1999-2000 : Xavier Mestres
- 2000-2001 : Carles Gaig
- 2001-2002 : Jordi LP
- 2002-2003 : La Cubana
- 2003-2004 : Toni Albà
- 2004-2005 : Rosa Andreu
- 2005-2006 : Pere Tàpies
- 2006-2007 : Lax'n'busto
- 2007-2008 : Anna Barrachina
- 2008-2009 : Montserrat Estruch
- 2009-2010 : Oriol Llavina

== See also ==
- Salsa Romesco, a Catalan nut and red pepper-based sauce
- List of almond dishes
