= Gato Pérez =

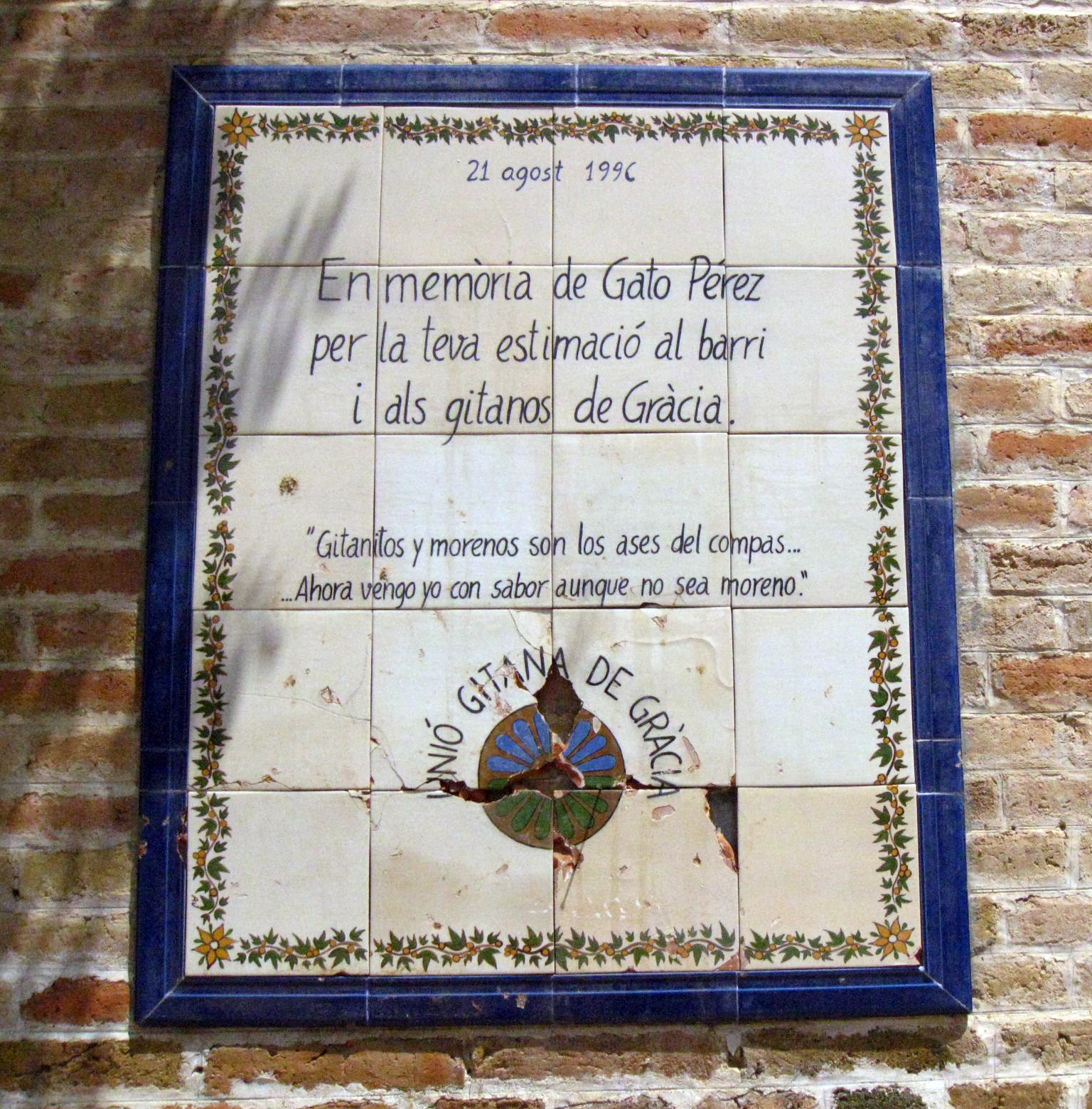
- Memorial plaque

Background information
- Birth name: Xavier Patricio Pérez Álvarez
- Born: April 11, 1951; Buenos Aires
- Died: October 18, 1990 (aged 39); Caldes de Montbui
- Genres: Catalan rumba
- Occupation(s): Composer, singer
- Instrument(s): Bass, guitar
- Website: http://www.gatoperez.cat

Xavier Patricio Pérez Álvarez (April 11, 1951 – October 18, 1990), known as Gato Pérez, was a musician of Argentine origin who settled in Catalonia. He stood out in the Catalan rumba musical genre, which he merged with salsa and an original style. He was a singer, composer, and bass guitarist.

== Biography ==
Although he was born in Buenos Aires, Pérez came from Spanish families that had emigrated after the civil war. His paternal grandparents were from Asturias and La Rioja; and his maternal grandparents were from León and Burgos. In Madrid, his paternal grandfather owned a fleet of cabs for the diplomatic corps. At the beginning of the war, he fled to Barcelona, where he worked in a Russian aeronautical factory and then went to the refugee camps in the south of France. After falling ill with tuberculosis, Pérez's grandfather returned to his right-wing family in Barcelona. In 1948, his father emigrated to Buenos Aires, where he met Pérez's mother, who was a pianist.

Gato Pérez was born in Buenos Aires. He grew up in an upper-middle-class neighborhood and was educated in a bilingual school attended by the children of the industrial and financial bourgeoisie of Buenos Aires, whom he detested. His first introduction to music was through his grandfather, listening to the radio together. It was the radio that introduced him to the rock and roll of Bill Haley and His Comets, which was a complete epiphany for Pérez. His first performance was at the English school prom playing "Claudette" and "Wake Up Little Susie" by the Everly Brothers. Rock and roll had arrived much earlier in Argentina than in Spain, and the Argentine musicians learned to rock much earlier than the Spaniards did, which would be decisive for the fact that it was the same Argentines who introduced fresh, Hispanic rock during the Transition. Before arriving in Spain, Pérez was part of a pampera music group, Los Baguales ("The Rude Boys") and, upon arriving in Barcelona, he continued with the rock group Los Salvajes ("The Savages") and Los Cheyennes.

== Artistic background ==
In 1966, Pérez arrived in Barcelona with his mother to join his father, who had made the trip earlier. After finishing high school, he settled for a while in London, with the aim of getting a job in a record company, but he had no luck and returned to Barcelona, where he worked as a butler because of his perfect English. His nickname, "Gato," came from his round face.

The first group he was part of in Barcelona was Revelación Mesmérica, with Rafael Zaragoza, which was later called Nosaltres, and finally, Pérez y Zaragoza, a Simon & Garfunkel type of act.

From the beginning of the 1970s, his musical restlessness led him to work with other musicians to form different bands such as Slo-Blo (country rock, and an attempt to emulate the Flying Burrito Brothers, which was the first group to perform in the Zeleste hall in Barcelona) and Secta Sónica ("Sonic Set") (jazz rock, partly derived from the previous group). He was one of the driving forces behind the Orquestra Platería, a salsa music and dance band created for street parties in Barcelona in 1974.

In 1977, he began experimenting with Catalan rumba and later released his first two albums (Carabruta and Romesco), followed by the more commercial Atalaya ("Watchtower"). According to Carlos Flaviá, "An Argentine prophet had to come to unite the gypsies here."

In 1981, Pérez suffered a heart attack and began to have serious health problems. The fatigue caused by his heart problems forced him to give up alcohol. His following albums were composed, in his own words, "under the effects of mineral water."

Pérez has been recognized as the a rejuvenating force of Catalan rumba, exactly at the time when it was going through its lowest period due to the strength of La Movida Madrileña. Pérez stands out in lyrical quality the fusion he achieved between rumba and other contemporary popular music styles, such as rock, salsa, or even bolero.

According to the artist himself:

The Catalan rumba is the characteristic and original music of urban Barcelona. It was born from a marginalized but deeply-rooted and distinctly Barcelona community and has a very attractive signature, somewhere between gypsy, flamenco and Central American, which cannot be compared to any known genre.

In addition, as a composer and lyricist, he introduced the first criticisms of the then incipient symptoms of discrimination against African workers and romani communities, as well as criticism of the pollution problems of an idyllic Mediterranean city.

His health problems would stay with him until his death, which was caused by a heart attack, in 1990. Subsequently, he has been the subject of numerous tributes from the music profession. Ventura Pons, who already counted on Gato Pérez for the soundtrack of his film La rubia del bar, has directed a documentary about his life, titled El gran Gato ("The Great Gato").

Marcos Ordóñez wrote a biography called Gato Pérez, la rumba como ética ("Gato Pérez, rumba as ethics," Júcar, 1987).

Ten years after his death, his friends and admirers gathered for a concert in his honor, with performances by: Carme Canela, Miqui Puig, Jaume Sisa, Ia Clua, Manel Joseph, Quintín Cabrera, Sergio Makaroff, the Som La Rumba troupe, the Manolos 2000, Marina Rosell, Yumitus, Rafaelito Salazar, and Son Com Son. The concert was held at the Sala Luz de Gas in Barcelona and was hosted by Ángel Casas, Pepe Rubianes and Carles Flaviá.

In 2010, in Barcelona's Gracia neighborhood held a new tribute, Gatos que bailan Pérez por los tejados, during the neighborhood's main festivities.

== Discography ==
=== With Secta Sónica ===
- Fred Pedralbes (1976) (Reissued in CD and digital format by Picap 2010)
- Astroferia (1977) (Reissued in CD and digital format by Picap 2010)

Guitars: Jordi Bonell, Rafael Zaragoza ("Zarita") and Víctor Cortina. Bass: Javier Patricio "Gato" Pérez. Drums: Toni Arasil and Jordi Vilella.

=== As Gato Perez ===
- Carabruta (1978)
- Romesco (1979; re-released in CD and digital format by Picap, 2007)
- Atalaya (1981)
- Prohibido maltratar a los gatos (1982)
- Flaires de Barcelunya (1982)
- Música (1983)
- Ke imbenten ellos (1984)
- Gato x Gato (1986; reissued in CD and digital format by Picap, 2003)
- La rubia del bar (1986; reissued in digital format by Picap, 2003)
- Ten (1987; reissued in CD and digital format by Picap, 2003)
- Fenicia (1990)
- Sabor de barrio (compilation, 1991)

=== Collaborations ===
- Tocats de Nadal - collective album (1988)

=== Tributes to Gato Pérez ===
- Orquesta Platería: Gatísimo (2002)
- Miscellaneous: El gran Gato, soundtrack of the film El gran Gato, directed by Ventura Pons (2003).
- Derrumband: & Los Amigos de Siempre (2011)
- Derrumband: A Barcelunya (2017). Tribute album to the LP Flaires de Barcelunya

=== Notable songs ===
- "Ja soc aquí"
- "Viejos automóviles"
- "La rumba de Barcelona"
- "El ventilador"
- "Rumba del's 60"
- "Todos los gatos son Pardos"
- "La curva del Morrot"
- "Gitanitos y morenos"
- "Se fuerza la máquina"
- "La rumba de aquí"
- "Luna brava"
- "Quise ser tu amigo"
- "El mismo de antes"
