= Pau Riba i Romeva =

Spanish songwriter (1948–2022)

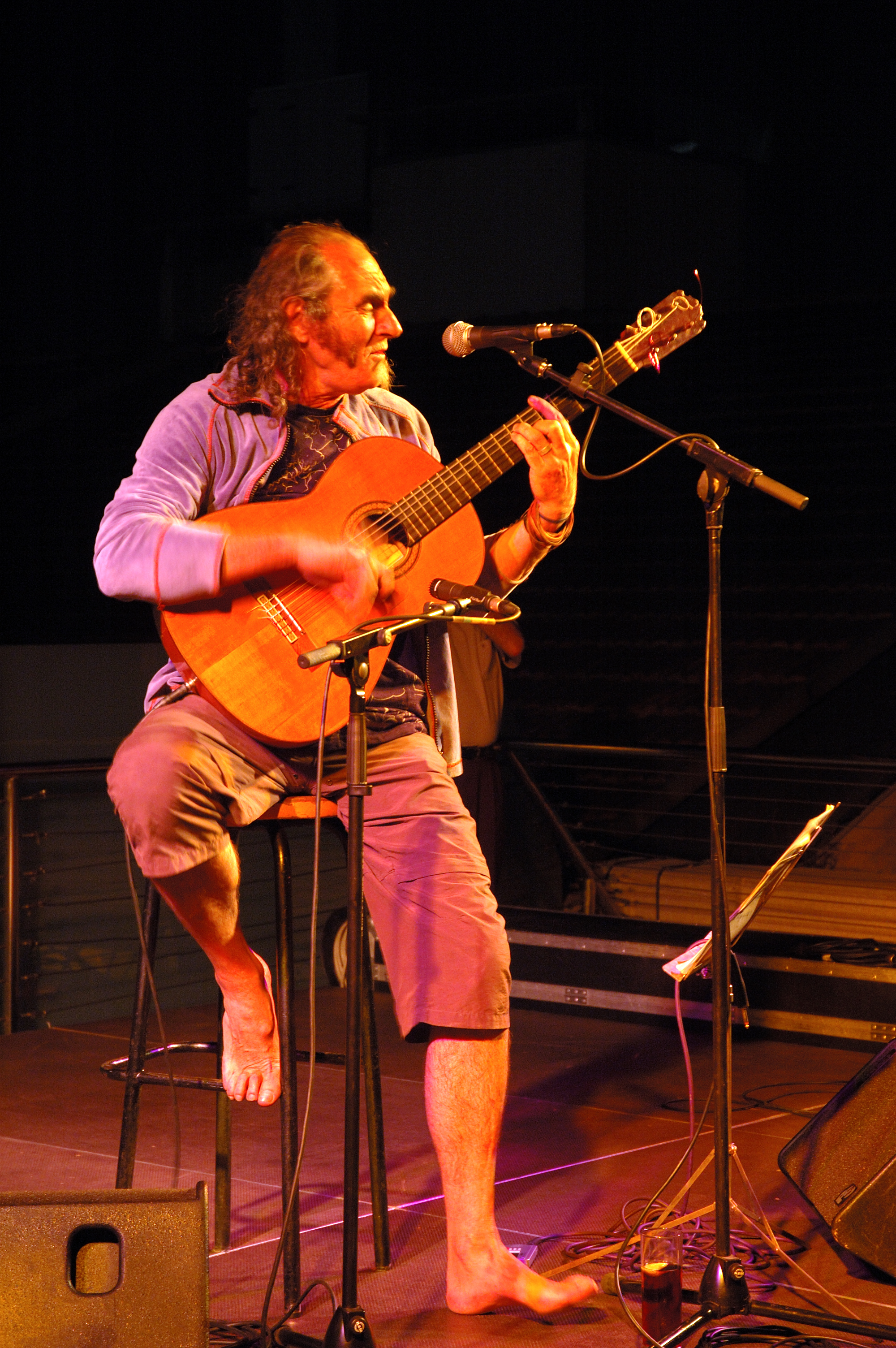
- Riba in 2005

Background information
- Born: 7 August 1948; Palma de Mallorca, Spain
- Died: 6 March 2022 (aged 73) Tiana, Catalonia, Spain
- Genres: Rock, contemporary folk, psychedelia, Nova Cançó
- Instrument: Guitar
- Years active: 1967–2022

Pau Riba (7 August 1948 – 6 March 2022) was a Spanish author and Mallorquín versatile artist. Riba was born in Palma de Mallorca, Spain on 7 August 1948. He started working during the 60s in the context of the counterculture. Riba died from pancreatic cancer on 6 March 2022, at the age of 73.

== Records ==
- 1967: Taxista (EP, Concèntric)
- 1967: El Nadal no té 20 anys, Maria del Mar Bonet, Maria Amèlia Pedrerol, Lluís Llach and Pau i Jordi (EP, Concèntric)
- 1968 En Pere Gallerí (Pau i Jordi) (EP, Concèntric)
- 1968: Noia de porcellana (EP, Concèntric)
- 1968: Folk-2 (Pau i Jordi and other members of the Grup de Folk) (LP, Als 4 Vents)
- 1972: El rei de Xauxa (Single, Concèntric)
- 1972 L'home estàtic (Single, Concèntric)
- 1969 Miniatures (with Jaume Sisa, Cachas and Albert Batiste) (EP, Concèntric)
- 1970: Dioptria I (LP, Concèntric)
- 1970 Ars eròtica (promotional single)
- 1970: Mareta Bufona (promotional single)
- 1971: Dioptria II (LP, Concèntric)
- 1971: Jo, la donya i el gripau (LP, Edigsa)
- 1975: Electròccid àccid alquimístic xoc (LP, Movieplay-Série Gong)
- 1977: Licors (LP, Movieplay-Série Gong)
- 1979: Rollo roc (Single, Edigsa)
- 1981: Amarga Crisi (LP, Edigsa)
- 1986: Transnarcís (double LP −3 sides-, with book, little books and perfumes. Edicions de l'Eixample)
- 1987: Nadal (Single, Ed. de l'Eixample)
- 1993: Disc Dur (LP, On the Rocks 2001/CD)
- 1994: De riba a riba La Col·lecció del Taller 7 (CD, Taller de Músics)
- 1997: Cosmossoma (CD, Nuevos Medios 15 731 CD-Matriu/Matràs)
- 1998: Astarot Universdherba with the experimental concert of the Canet Roc 77 festival with Perucho's (CD in a tin can, edited by G3G Records and Matriu/Matràs)
- 1999: Joguines d'època i capses de mistos all early singles and EPs (Matriu/Matràs)
- 2001: Nadadales (in the CD book “Jisàs de Netzerit o capitol zero de la Guerra de les galaxies” —Jisàs of Netzerit or star wars chapter zero —. Columna + Matriu/Matràs)
- 2003: “Electròccid àccid alquimistic xoc/Licors”. Reissue 2 CDs in 1 with the covers superimposed. (CD, Time-Warner/Dro)
- 2003: “Licors”. Special remastered digipack reissue. (CD, Time-Warner/Dro 5046703282-LC 4720)
- 2005: “Electròccid àccid alquimistic xoc”. Special remastered digipack reissue. (CD, Time-Warner/Dro 5046771812-LC 00002)
- 2011: “40 Gripaus” (deluxe reissue of “Jo, la donya I el gripau” with a new cover by Miquel Barceló. Matriu/matràs)
- 2013: “mosques de colors” with Pascal Comelade (Discmedi Blau DM5088-02)

== Books ==
- 1968: Cançons i poemes (Prologue by Raimon. Col·lecció “Les Hores Extres”, 268 pgs. Barcelona).
- 1976: Graficolorància (Prologue by Oriol Tramvia. Pastanaga Editors. Col·lecció “Els Tebeollibres”, 164 pgs. Barcelona).
- 1981: Euro Rock (Schlemmer, Vielfraß, Abstinenzter und Rock'n'Roll-Kekse”. Ed. Rowoht. Hamburg).
- 1985: Trànsit —Prosopopeia de la infància— Poems. With illustrations and gravures by Mercè Riba. (Taller d'Aixa. Llampaies).
- 1987: Ena Novel: a group of old persons decide to come back to childhood. (Quaderns Crema. 30 pgs. Barcelona).
- 1988: La gran corrida Journalistic essay. From May of '68 to the elections of '88. An analysis of two decades. Interviews with the principal candidates for the presidency of the Generalitat de Catalunya. (Quaderns Crema. 112 pgs. Barcelona).
- 1997: Lletrarada (all the songs). Prologue by Julià Guillamon. Epílogue by Enric Casasses. (Edicions Proa- “Els llibres de l'Óssa Menor”, Barcelona).
- 1998: Actors gramàtics (With Jaume Sisa). Poetry. (Edicions matriu/matràs. Barcelona).
- 1999: Al·lolàlia (Compilation of periodical articles with prologue by Màrius Serra). (Edicions Proa. Col·lecció “Perfils”. Barcelona).
- 2001: Jisàs de Netzerit o capítol zero de la guerra de les galàxies (CD-Book) illustrated by Max, Pau, Pere Joan, Alex Fito, Gabi i Linhart. Includes the CD “Nadadales”. (Editorial Columna. Barcelona).
- 2006: Nosaltres els terrorists. Essay. According to Enric Casasses, a political discourse similar to Noam Chomsky’s one but shorter, clearer, better argued and more revolutionary. (Edicions matriu/matràs. Tiana).
- 2006: Màximes maximalistes Poems. Images by Francesc Vidal. (Arola Editors. Tarragona).
- 2013: “Sa meu mare”. A portrait of his mother. (Ara Llibres. Barcelona).
