= Al Tall (band) =

Spanish folk music group

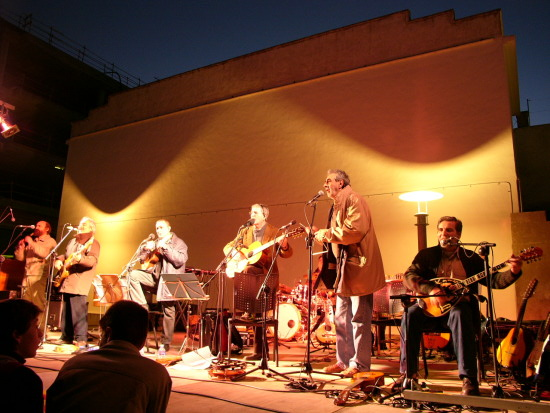
- Al Tall performing 2007

Background information
- Origin: Valencia, Spain
- Genre: Folk
- Years active: 1975–2012
- Labels: Edigsa, PDI, PICAP
- Past members: Vicent Torrent; Jordi Reig; Miguel Blanco; Enric Banyuls; Xavier Ahuir; Robert Moreno; Miquel Gil; Enric Esteve; Enric Ortega; Pep Gómez; Empar Torres; Vicent Cortina; Ximo Caffarena; Eliseo Parra; Ferran S. Manzaneque; Vicent Alonso; Vicent Hervàs; Eladio Reinón; Joseph Rodilla; Ángel Estellés; Xema Senabre; Vicent-Lluis Fontelles; Ramon Garcia; Montse Anfruns; Maribel Crespo; Josemi Sánchez; José V. Morillo; Manuel Miralles
- Website: www.altall.cat (ca., es., en.)

Al Tall was a Valencian folk music group from Valencia in Spain. It was formed in 1975 by Vicent Torrent, Manuel Miralles, and Miquel Gil. and was dissolved in October 2012.

Al Tall created and interpreted the folk trend "riproposta", Italian term that means the recovery not only of ancient melodies and romances, but modern creation based on the basic sounds and traditional forms of music.

Al Tall is a part -together Milladoiro (Galicia) Oskorri (Basque Country) and "Nuevo Mester de Juglaría" (Castile) – the set of bands which consolidated the folk music from different Iberian traditions as a new folk genre from which have developed hundreds of groups.

Singer Manuel Miralles died on 29 July 2023, at the age of 71.

== Discography ==
| Year | Title | Label |
|---|---|---|
| 1975 | Cançó popular, País Valencià | Edigsa |
| 1976 | Deixeu que rode la roda | Edigsa |
| 1978 | Posa vi, posa vi, posa vi... | Edigsa |
| 1978 | A Miquel assassinaren (dedicated to Gomez Miguel Grau) | Edigsa |
| 1979 | Quan el mal ve d'Almansa... | PDI |
| 1979 | Nadal valencià I i II | Ànec |
| 1980 | Som de la pelitrúmpeli | Ànec |
| 1982 | Cançons de la nostra Mediterrània (with Maria del Mar Bonet) | Ariola |
| 1983 | Tocs i vares | Edigsa |
| 1984 | 10 anys | PDI |
| 1985 | Xarq al-Andalus (with Muluk el-Hwa) | RTVE-Música |
| 1979 | Xavier "el Coixo" | Difusió Mediterrània |
| 1991 | Quart creixent | |
| 1994 | Europ eu! (dedicated to Guillem Agulló i Salvador) | PDI |
| 1995 | Antologia: vint anys d'Al Tall | La Màscara |
| 1999 | La nit | PICAP |
| 2001 | 25 anys en directe | PICAP |
| 2004 | Vares velles | PICAP |
| 2006 | Envit a vares | PICAP |
| 2009 | Vergonya, cavallers, vergonya | PICAP |
| 2012 | Cant de l'Aplec dels Ports (single) | |

== Bibliography ==
- Cosmos, Àngel (1981). Al Tall canta amb el poble (in Catalan). Pamplona, Spain: Euskal Bidea. ISBN 978-84-85490-15-8. OCLC 17027726.
- Torrent, Vicent (1990). Música popular (in Spanish). Valencia, Spain: Edicions Alfons el Magnànim. ISBN 978-84-7822-987-1. OCLC 23139085.
- Mansanet i Boïgues, Víctor (1995). Al Tall: vint anys (in Catalan). Valencia, Spain: Editorial La Màscara. ISBN 978-84-7974-113-6. OCLC 35829033.
