= Pere Tàpias =

Catalan singer and writer

- Joan Collell i Xirau
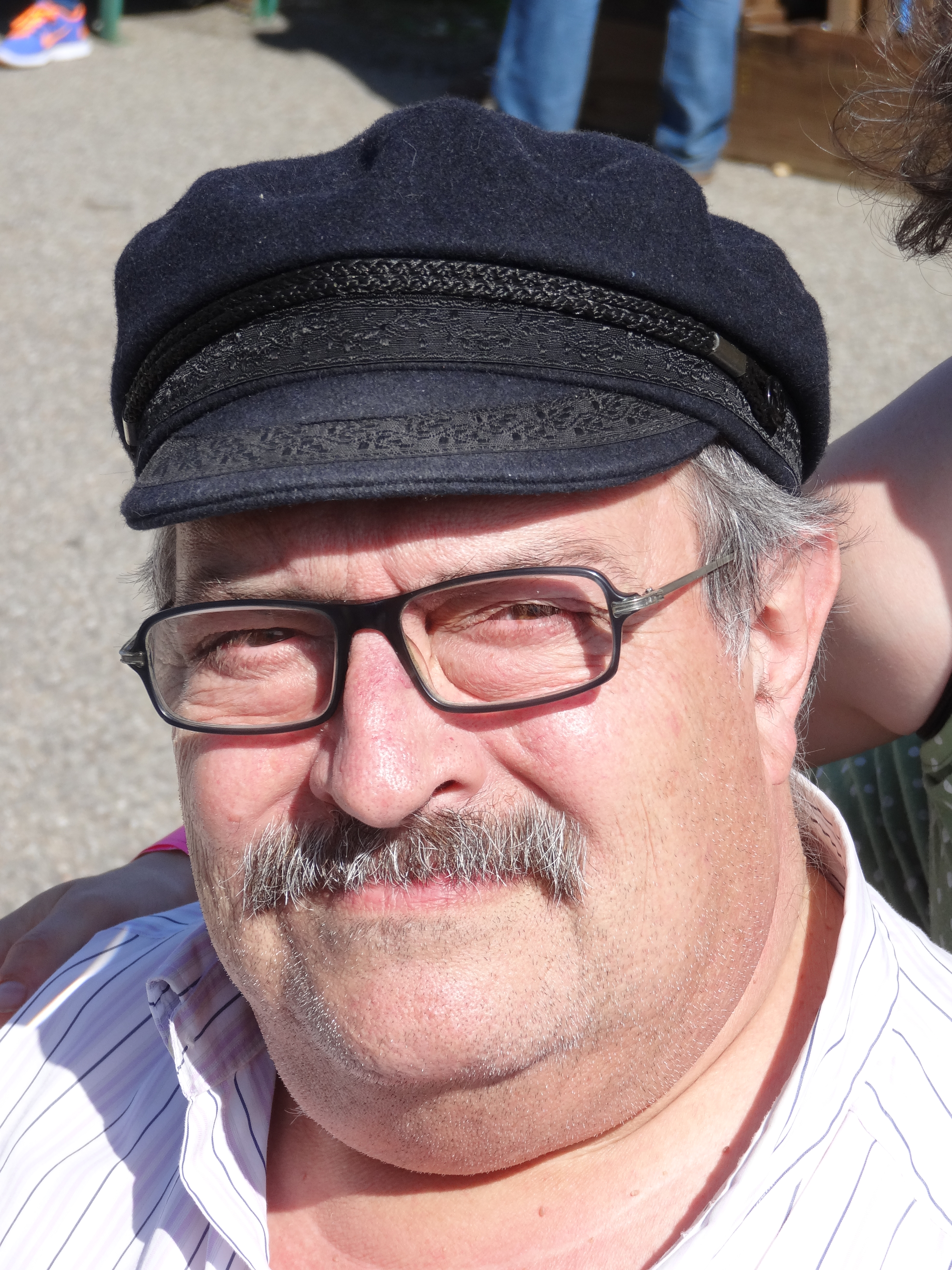
- Born: 19 May 1946; Vilanova i la Geltrú
- Died: 22 April 2017 (aged 70); Sant Pere de Ribes
- Known for: Singer and food writer

Pere Tàpias (Catalan pronunciation: [ˈpeɾə ˈtapiəs]; 19 May 1946 – 22 April 2017) was a singer and a food writer in Catalonia, Spain. He resided in Vilanova i la Geltrú at the time of his death in April 2017. He was the host of the Catalunya Ràdio program, Tàpies Variades. He was the 2005–2006 Ambassor of Xató.

== Publications ==
- Cuines de Vilanova: Xató, all cremat, ranxo, sípia a la bruta, arrossos. Col·lecció El Cullerot
