= Albert Pla =

Catalan singer-songwriter and actor

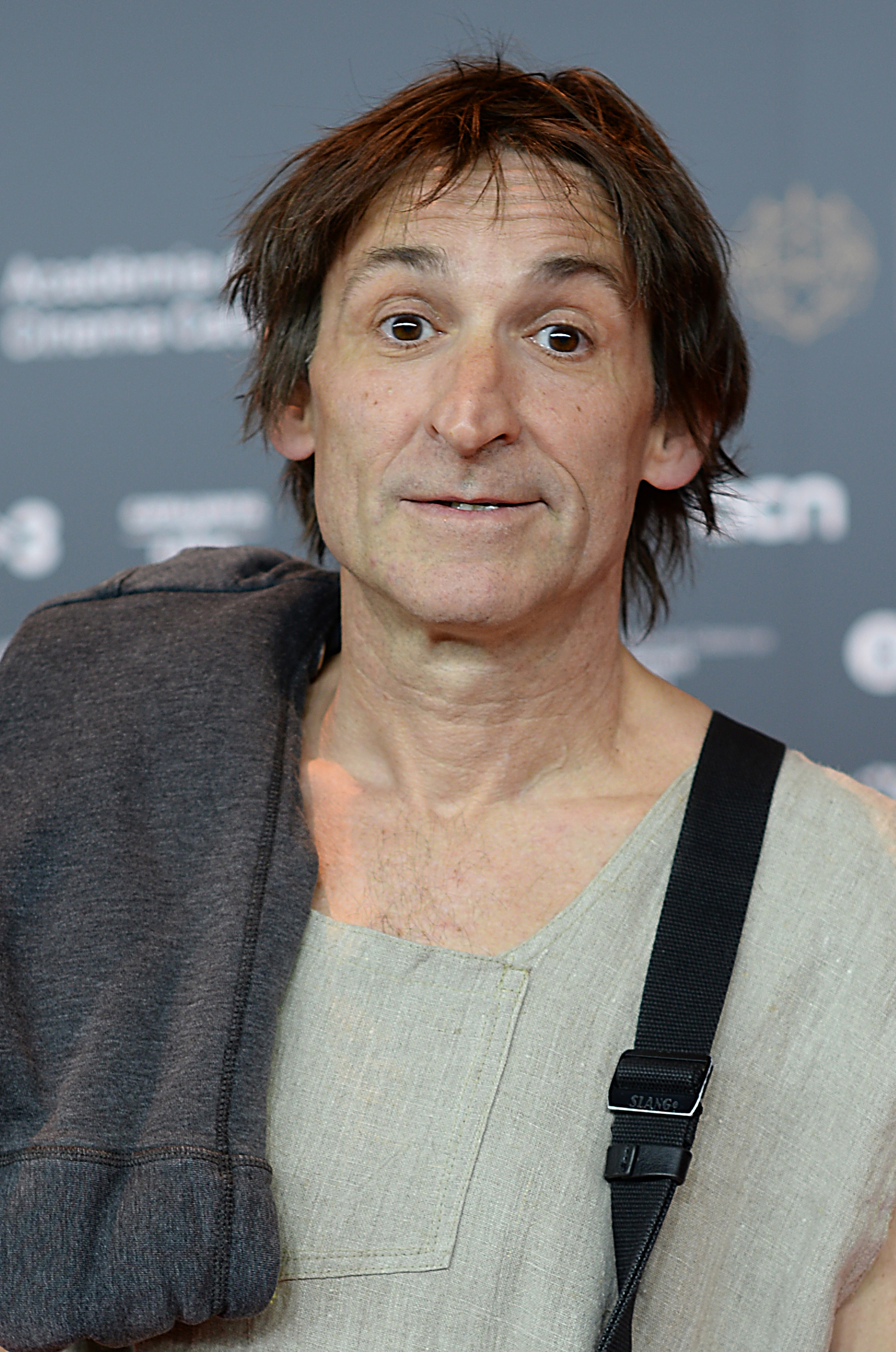
- Pla in 2020
- Born: Albert Pla i Álvarez; 22 September 1966 (age 59); Sabadell, Spain
- Occupations: Singer; songwriter; actor

Albert Pla i Álvarez (born 22 September 1966) is a Catalan singer-songwriter and actor. Noted for his irreverent lyrics and transgressive persona, he performs both in Catalan and Spanish.

== Life and career ==
Albert Pla i Álvarez was born in Sabadell on 22 September 1966.

In 1988, Pla won the National Singer-Songwriters Contest held in Jaén. With a professional background as a textile patternmaker, he released his debut musical album, the Catalan-language Ho sento molt, in 1989. It was followed by Aquí s'acaba el que es donava (1990). His first album fully in Spanish was No sólo de rumba vive el hombre.

He made his film debut as an actor in Juanma Bajo Ulloa's box-office hit Airbag (1997). In the film, he portrays a priest who performs "Soy rebelde" in a brothel. He has since worked as an actor in film and television titles, such as A los que aman (1998), Honor of the Knights (2006), Murieron por encima de sus posibilidades (2014), The Barcelona Vampiress (2020), La mesías (2023), Escape and The Platform 2. In addition to his acting career, his songs have been featured in The Day of the Beast and Live Flesh. His portrayal of ultra-Catholic Pep in La mesías earned him a Feroz Award for Best Supporting Actor in a Series.

After meeting in 2003 during the staging of theatre play Canciones de amor y droga, he has been in a relationship with actress Judit Farrés.
