= Ovidi Montllor =

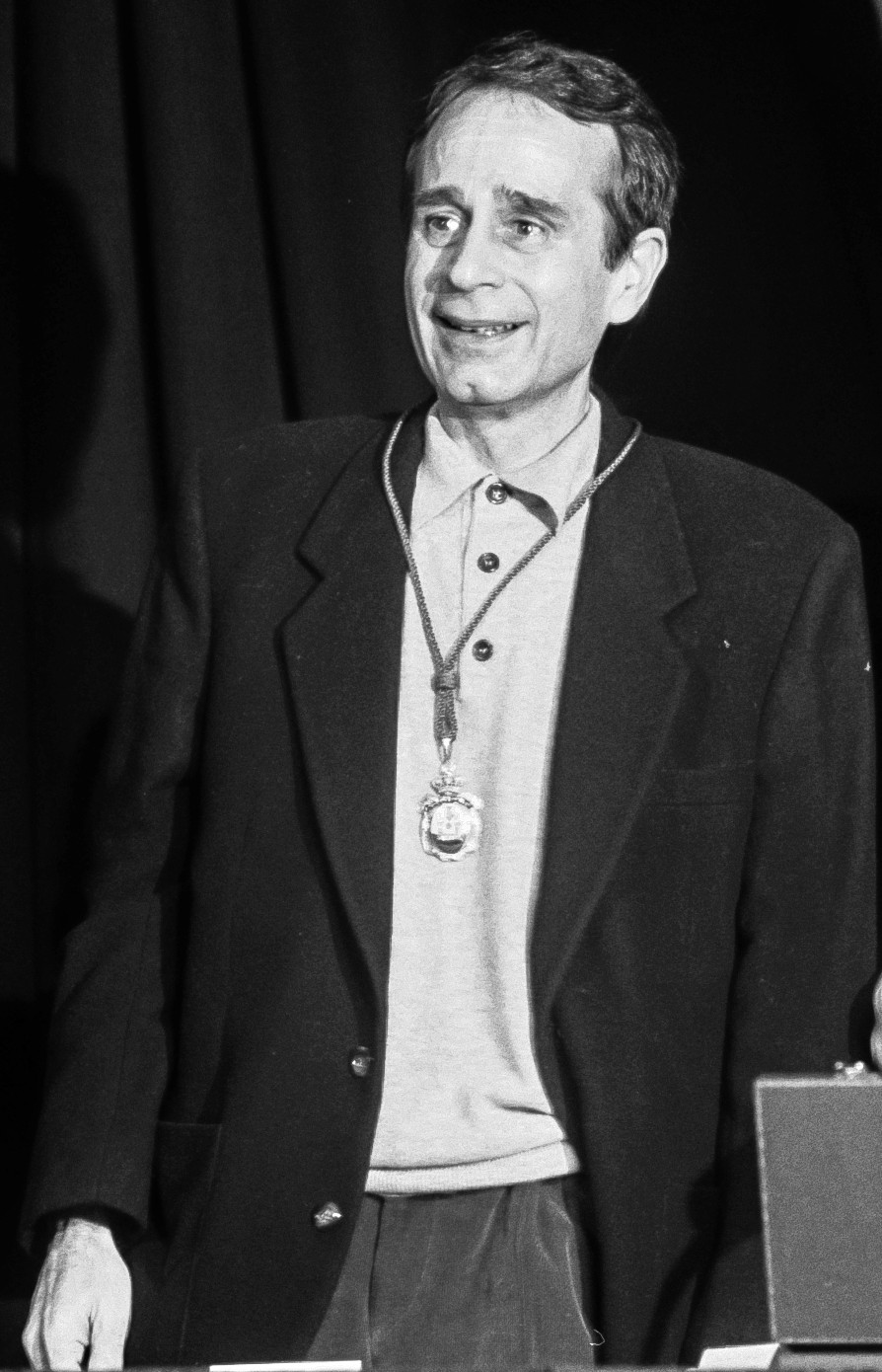
- Montllor, receiving a medal from his hometown.

Background information
- Born: Ovidi Montllor Mengual; 4 February 1942; Alcoi, Valencian Community
- Died: 10 March 1995 (aged 53) Barcelona, Catalonia
- Genres: Nova Cançó
- Occupations: Singer-songwriter actor
- Instruments: Vocals guitar
- Years active: 1968–1995
- Labels: Discophon, Edigsa, Ariola

Ovidi Montllor (Catalan pronunciation: [oˈviði moɲˈʎoɾ]; 4 February 1942 in Alcoi, Spain – 10 March 1995 in Barcelona, Spain) was a Valencian singer-songwriter and actor.

== Career ==
A native of Alcoi, at the age of 24 Montllor moved to Barcelona, where he was a member of various independent theater groups, including the CICF, and later with Núria Espert and Adrià Gual. In 1968, he began to sing songs with lyrics by songwriters such as Vincent Andrés Estellés, Pere Quart, as well as writing several songs by himself.

Montllor was known for his deep voice and his histrionic on-stage manners, and went on to become one of the most talented members of the Nova Cançó movement, albeit one of the least popular. As a result of the tributes paid to him by internationally renowned artists such as Miquel Gil and Pascal Comelade, his work has received increased attention from music lovers in the last few years.

Montllor's gift for acting led to him being cast alongside Lola Gaos in José Luis Borau's Furtivos, one of the most important films in the history of Spanish cinema.

== Illness and death ==
Montllor died of esophageal cancer in Barcelona on 10 March 1995, at the age of 53. Five months earlier, his hometown of Alcoi had paid him an emotional tribute in recognition of his success.

== Tributes ==
In 2005, on the tenth anniversary of his death, a series of tributes and celebrations in honour of Montllor took place throughout the Catalan countries.

Also in 2005, Inadaptats, a Catalan independentist music band, recorded a CD entitled "Homenatge a Ovidi" ("A Tribute to Ovidi") with covers of 14 of Montllor's most famous songs.

Valencian pro-independence band Obrint Pas dedicated their 2006 track "No Hem Oblidat" (We Have Not Forgotten) to Montllor.

== Discography ==
=== Studio releases ===
==== EPs ====
- "La Fera Ferotge" / "Llicó De Sumes i Verbs" / "Cançó De Les Balances" / "Cançó De Llaurador" (1968)
- "Gola Seca" / "La Fàbrica Paulac" / "Cançó d'Amor" / "Història d'Un Amic" (1969)

==== Singles ====
- Sol d'estiu / Ell (1971)

==== Albums ====
- Un entre tants... (1972)
- Crònica d'un temps (1973)
- A Alcoi (1974) (Reissued by Picap 2008)
- Salvat-Papasseit per Ovidi Montllor (1975) (Reissued by Picap 2007)
- Ovidi Montllor diu 'Coral romput' (1979)
- Bon vent... i barca nova! (1979)
- 4.02.42 (1980)
- Verí Good (posthumous, 2000; only one of its songs was finished, El Meu Poble Alcoi)

=== Live albums ===
- Ovidi Montllor a l'Olympia (1975) (Reissued by Picap 2008)
- De manars i garrotades (1977) (Reissued by Picap 2008)

=== Other releases ===
- Ovidi Montllor... per sempre (anthology, 1995)
- Antologia (exhaustive anthology, 2000)

== Partial filmography ==
- Furia Española (1975) - Ricardo
- Furtivos (1975) - Ángel
- La ciutat cremada (1976) - Emiliano Iglesias
- La siesta (1976) - Calixto
- La nova cançó (1976, Documentary) - Himself
- Lletres catalanes (1976-1979, TV Series) - Ignasi / Gabriel de Beaumont / Josafat / El vigilant
- L'obscura història de la cosina Montse (1977) - Paco / Cousin
- La portentosa vida del padre Vicent (1978) - Miló
- Soldados (1978) - Agustín
- Companys, procés a Catalunya (1979) - Jordi
- La Sabina (1979) - Manolín
- La verdad sobre el caso Savolta (1980) - Miranda
- La campanada (1980) - Ullóa
- Con el culo al aire (1980) - Juan
- El nido (1980) - Manuel
- Viaje al más allá (1980) - Carlos
- Te quiero, te quiero, te quiero (1980)
- Sexo sangriento (1981) - El mudo
- Putapela (1981)
- La fuga de Segovia (1981) - Oriol
- Los embarazados (1982) - Luis
- El fascista, doña Pura y el follón de la escultura (1983) - Ramón Prats
- El pico (1983) - El Cojo
- El invernadero (1983) - Carlos Jiménez
- Héctor, el estigma del miedo (1984) - Héctor
- Un, dos, tres... ensaïmades i res més (1985) - Mike Vidal
- Fuego eterno (1985) - Estebanot
- Escapada final (Scapegoat) (1985) - Arnau Neyras
- Teo el pelirrojo (1986) - Luis
- Bar-Cel-Ona (1987) - Home
- La veritat oculta (1987) - Lladre
- Material urbà (1987) - Cambrer
- Amanece como puedas (1988) - Jenaro
- El aire de un crimen (1988) - Domingo Cuadrado
- Amanece, que no es poco (1988) - Pascual
- Un negro con un saxo (1989) - Director L'Hora
- Gran Sol (1989)
- El río que nos lleva (1989) - Cuatrodedos
- La banyera (1989)
- El acto (1989) - Hombre historia moneda
- Monte bajo (1989)
- La teranyina (1990) - Cordetes
- Perfidia (1991)
- El largo invierno (1992) - Juan
- Blue Gin (1992)
- El beso de la mujer araña (1996, TV Series)
- L'hivernacle
