= Jaume Sisa =

Catalan singer-songwriter

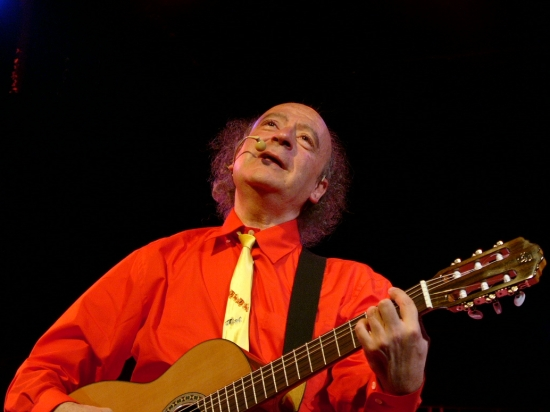
Catalan singer-songwriter Jaume Sisa performing live in Huesca

Jaume Sisa (born 1948 in El Poble-sec, Barcelona) is a Catalan singer-songwriter, who defines himself as 'Galactic', and whose greatest hit was Qualsevol nit pot sortir el sol from his eponymous album, released in 1975. Songs such as Nit de Sant Joan, El setè cel and L'home dibuixat are also well-known and remembered in the Catalan linguistic area.

== Career ==
He is one of the main icons of the Catalan underground culture during the 70s and 80s, along with figures such as Pau Riba, Gato Pérez, or Jordi Batiste. Throughout his career he cultivated many and diverse musical styles such as progressive music, rock, folk, musical, copla and bolero. He influenced several subsequent generations of Catalan musicians.

He was part of Grup de Folk's collective, and also Música Dispersa and Orquestra Plateria groups. He also collaborated closely with Dagoll Dagom's theatre company.

Although he wrote most of his work in Catalan, he settled in Madrid during 10 years, where he adopted the heteronym Ricardo Solfa. During this time he published 4 records in Spanish.

== Discography ==
=== With the group Música Dispersa ===
- 1971 - Música Dispersa

=== Under the name Jaume Sisa ===
- 1968 - L'home dibuixat (single)
- 1969 - Miniatura (EP with Pau Riba, El Cachas and Albert Batiste)
- 1971 – L'orgia
- 1975 – Qualsevol nit pot sortir el sol
- 1976 – Galeta galàctica
- 1977 – La catedral
- 1979 – La màgia de l'estudiant
- 1979 – Antaviana
- 1980 – Sisa i Melodrama
- 1981 – Nit de Sant Joan
- 1981 – Noche de San Juan
- 1982 – Barcelona postal
- 1983 – Roda la música
- 1984 – Transcantautor
- 1985 – Sisa (Compilation)
- 1994 – Sisa: "El més galàctic" (Compilation)
- 1996 – “El Viajante”, with Mestres, Llamado y Solfa (Disc-book)
- 2001 – Visca la llibertat (Drac/Virgin)
- 2002 – Bola voladora (Drac/Virgin)
- 2005 – Sisa al Zeleste 1975
- 2005 – El congrès dels solitaris
- 2006 – Sisa y Suburbano cantan a Vainica Doble
- 2008 – Ni cap ni peus (with Joan Miquel Oliver)

=== Under the name Ricardo Solfa ===
- 1987 – Carta a la novia
- 1989 – Cuando tú seas mayor
- 1992 – Ropa fina en las ruinas
