= Lluís Bonet i Garí =

Spanish architect (1893–1993)

Lluís Bonet Garí
- Born: 5 August 1893; Argentona, Catalonia, Spain
- Died: 30 January 1993 (aged 99); Barcelona, Catalonia, Spain
- Education: Barcelona School of Architecture (1918)
- Occupation: Architect
- Children: Jordi, Narcís Bonet i Armengol, Lluís
- Parent(s): Miquel Bonet Amigó, Doña Garí
- Relatives: Josep Puig i Cadafalch (cousin); Jordi Bonet (nephew)
- Awards: Creu de Sant Jordi (1982)

Lluis Bonet Garí (Catalan: Lluís Bonet i Garí) (5 August 1893 – 30 January 1993) was a Catalan architect of the Noucentisme movement.

== Early life and education ==
Bonet was the son of Miquel Bonet Amigó, Professor of Organic Chemistry at the University of Barcelona. His maternal uncle, Josep Garí, was a second cousin to Josep Puig i Cadafalch, a fellow architect whom Garí commissioned for the renovation of his summer home in Sant Miquel del Cros, Argentona in 1898. Bonet was inspired by the work as a child, and encouraged him to pursue a career in architecture.

He studied at the Barcelona School of Architecture and graduated in 1918. During his years he trained with his Puig, his 2nd cousin 1x removed, and attended the Galí Academy. From 1914 onwards, he worked in the studio of renowned Catalan Modernist Antoni Gaudí, along with many other architecture students of his generation, such as Joan Bergós, Cèsar Martinell, and Isidre Puig. Once he obtained a degree in architecture, he formed a studio with fellow architects Bergós, Antoni Puig, Albert Carbó, and Rafael Solanic. He worked for the Monuments Cataloguing Service of Catalonia, and with connections to his cousin, was appointed municipal architect of Castelltersol.

== Career ==
=== Early career ===
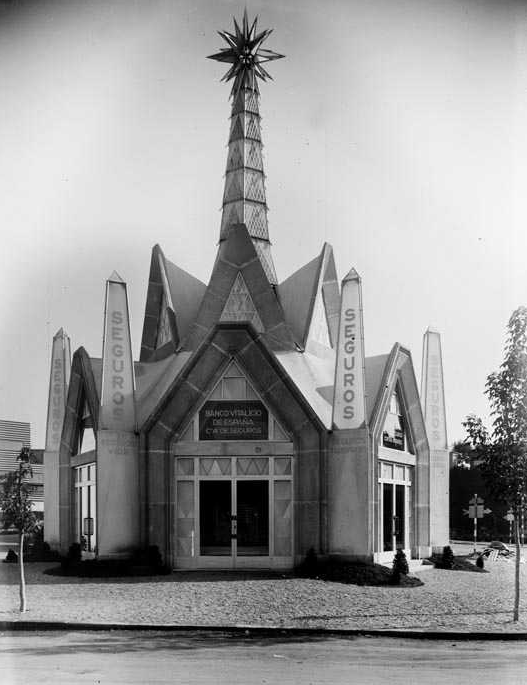
Pavilion of the Banco Vitalicio de España for the 1929 Barcelona International Exposition

His first works, created between 1918 and 1936, were subject to the Noucentisme movement, a Catalan reaction against modernism. His first assignment was a bank office for the Arnús Garí organization on Passeig de Gràcia, which was a job provided to him through his maternal family. In Castelltersol he was in charge of constructing the sanitation network as municipal architect, as well as the urbanization of the Prat de la Riba square. He was tasked with the construction of new schools and a monument dedicated to de la Riba, the president of Catalonia. He also began to work in religious architecture, which became one of his specialties, with work for the church of Castellfollit de Riubregós and the bell tower of Santa Madrona in Barcelona. In Argentona, he replaced his cousin as the head of construction for the Cros summer house, the estate of his maternal family, where he designed the garden and chapel in Gaudí style.

In the 1920s, he build two residential buildings in Barcelona: the Riudor House in 1926 (13 Marià Cubí St) and the Salvat house in 1928 (486 Calle del Consejo de Ciento). He mixed elements of both traditional architecture and Renaissance architecture. For the 1929 International Exhibition in Barcelona, he build the pavilion of the Banco Vitalicio de España with an original design of his highlighting decorations that resembled a tropical environment.

In the early 1930s, he began combining Noucentisme with traditional Catalan architecture in works such as his villa in Vilassar de Mar, the Bonet-Godó in Teyá, the Carreras Patxot and Maria Darna house in Pedralbes, the Hotel Prudenci in Tona, and his building on 407 Avinguda Diagonal in Barcelona. In contrast, his building for Polydor Records in San Adrián de Besós, now the town hall, was built in the rationalist style and was influenced by German architect K. Räger.

During the 1930s, he build a series of buildings for the Banco Vitalicio de España, one of whose directors was his uncle, Josep Garí, his best client. That year, he built the headquarters for its branch in Valencia in a neoclassical style with Valencian ceramics. Later, he built a branch in Madrid on Calle de Alcalá, a combination of both classicism and rationalism. That was followed by a branch in Tarragona in German-style architecture. Lastly, he built a branch in Barcelona (Passeig de Gràcia 11), one of his most notable works, planned before the civil war but delayed until 1942, completing construction in 1950.

In 1930, Bonet worked on the Cavas Codorniu in Sant Sadurní d'Anoia, succeeding the work of his cousin. It is located on a plot of 6 hectares, and he restored the old offices and designed workshops, the entrance courtyard, the estate square, and the gardens. He worked on the building intermittently until 1980. He also worked on the chapel of the Sagrada Familia and new wineries of Arcs and Baix.

By the beginning of the Civil War, he worked on several school projects commissioned by the Union of Architects, but stopped working in June 1937 and moved to Seville, working as a cashier. In 1938, he won second prize in a project competition at the Central de Bomberos of Valladolid, and restored the López de Ayala theater in Badajoz.

=== Return to Barcelona ===
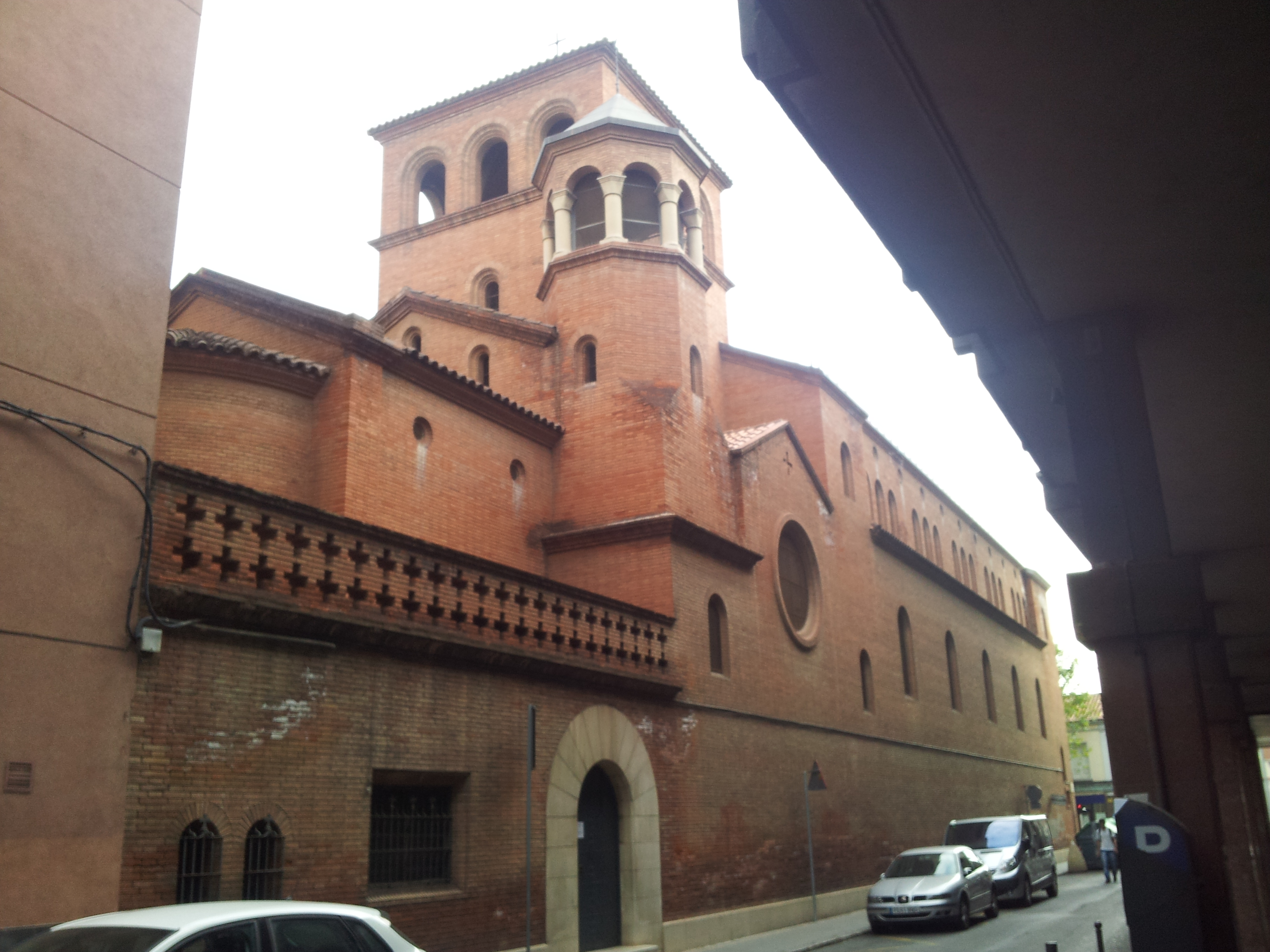
Church of the Holy Trinity in Sabadell

In 1939, Bonet returned to Barcelona, and a year later designed the rationalist Singer building on Carrer de Fontanella. At the same time, he was commissioned by the Seminary of Vic and won a competition for the presbytery of the Terrassa Cathedral with painter Antoni Vila Arrufat and sculptor Enric Monjo. In 1940, he restored the parish church of San Cristóbal in Premià de Mar and constructed the church of the Holy Trinity in Sabadell. He was also the architect behind the tabernacle at the Iglesia de San Vicente in Sarriá.

In 1942, he received the honor of being in charge of construction of the headquarters for the National Institute of Welfare in Barcelona, on Balmes street and Gran Vía. That year, he also built the Millet house in L'Ametlla del Vallès and was commissioned to rebuild a village in Pals. In 1946, he designed the Cross in the square of the Monastery of Pedralbes. He also designed the South American Insurance House, the Banco Vitalicio locations in Gerona, Lleida, Las Palmas, and Seville, as well as many Barcelonés residential buildings.

In the 1950s, he build a bank in Sabadell, as well as the towns' church, the Church of Immaculate Conception. He build the convent of the Poor Clares in Mataró and the Raymat wineries in Cervelló. He built a residence for Pere Sensat in Llinars del Vallès, a sanctuary in Figaró-Montmany. and the Rivière building on Ronda de Sant Pere in Barcelona.

He joined a team of architects in 1962 responsible for the construction of the Sagrada Família, along with Isidre Puig and Francesc Quintana, with whom he built the new facade of the Passion. Between 1974 and 1983 he was the director of temple construction. Bonet's work on the temple continued until 1982, when all work on the building was stopped. Apart from his work during the 1960s on the Sagrada, he designed a house in L'Espluga de Francolí and worked on the restoration of the Poblet Abbey in 1962. He restored several farmhouses in Foixà, Llinars del Vallés and Cabrils. In 1966, he renovated the Torre de la Creu in Sant Joan Despí. During those later years, he collected many information on historical Catalan farmhouses, leading him to publish a work, Las masías del Maresme (1982). That year, he began suffering from cardiovascular issues that caused him to retire, although he continued to follow news and studies in architecture.

During the regime of Francisco Franco, Bonet helped spread a retainance of Catalan culture and hosted many sessions of the Institute of Catalan Studies at his home. He was the father of architect Jordi Bonet i Armengol, who, like him, directed the works of the Sagrada Familia, and Lluís Bonet i Armengol, priest of the Sagrada Familia. He was the paternal uncle of Jordi Bonet i Godó.

== Sources ==
- Ferrer, David; Colegio Oficial de Arquitectos de Cataluña y Baleares, eds. (2002). Los arquitectos de Gaudi: exposición; catálogo. Barcelona: ACTAR. ISBN 978-84-88258-90-8.
- Barral, Xavier (2000). Guia del patrimoni monumental i artístic de Catalunya. Pòrtic guies (in Catalan). Pòrtic. ISBN 978-84-7306-947-2.
- Lecea, Ignasi de; Universidad de Barcelona, eds. (2009). Art public de Barcelona. Barcelona: Àmbit. ISBN 978-84-96645-08-0.
