= Premià =

Premià may refer to two places in the Province of Barcelona, Catalonia, Spain:

- Premià de Dalt, Maresme
- Premià de Mar, Maresme

== See also ==
- Premia, comune in the Province of Verbano-Cusio-Ossola, Piedmont, Italy
