= Jordi Escobar =

Spanish footballer

Personal information
- Full name: Jordi Escobar Fernández
- Date of birth: 10 February 2002 (age 24)
- Place of birth: Sant Cebrià de Vallalta, Spain
- Height: 1.89 m (6 ft 2 in)
- Position: Forward

Team information
- Current team: Ceuta

Youth career
- 2007–2009: Tordera
- 2009–2010: Riudarenes
- 2010–2012: Barcelona
- 2011–2012: → Calella (loan)
- 2012–2015: Espanyol
- 2015–2020: Valencia

Senior career*
| Years | Team | Apps | (Gls) |
| 2018–2020 | Valencia B | 19 | (3) |
| 2020–2023 | Almería | 0 | (0) |
| 2021 | Almería B | 11 | (4) |
| 2021–2022 | → Barcelona B (loan) | 17 | (1) |
| 2022–2023 | → Betis B (loan) | 5 | (0) |
| 2023–2024 | Logroñés | 33 | (11) |
| 2024–2025 | Celta B | 30 | (11) |
| 2025–2026 | AVS | 5 | (0) |
| 2026 | Huesca | 16 | (4) |
| 2026– | Ceuta | 0 | (0) |

International career^{‡}
| 2018 | Spain U16 | 3 | (2) |
| 2018–2019 | Spain U18 | 21 | (5) |
| 2019 | Spain U19 | 3 | (1) |
- * Club domestic league appearances and goals as of 9 June 2026 ‡ National team caps and goals as of 31 January 2020

Jordi Escobar Fernández (born 10 February 2002) is a Spanish professional footballer who plays as a forward for AD Ceuta FC.

== Club career ==
=== Early career ===
Escobar was born in Sant Cebrià de Vallalta, Barcelona, Catalonia, and started his career at CF Tordera at the age of five. In 2009, after scoring 87 goals in one of the two seasons at Tordera, he joined CE Riudarenes, which had their youth squads controlled by FC Barcelona; he moved to La Masia just months after joining Riudarenes.

In 2012, after failing to settle at Barça and a subsequent loan to FE Calella, Escobar joined RCD Espanyol's youth setup. On 18 June 2015, he agreed to a deal with Valencia CF.

=== Valencia ===
On 5 January 2018, aged just 15, Valencia reached an agreement with Escobar to renew his contract until 2022. He was called up to the first team by manager Marcelino García Toral to make the pre-season in July, and made his debut for the club in a friendly against Galatasaray SK on the 21st; at the age of just 16 years, 5 months and 11 days, he became the fourth-youngest to debut for the club.

Escobar made his senior debut with the reserves on 2 September 2018, playing the last 12 minutes of a 0–1 Segunda División B away loss against CD Teruel. He scored his first senior goal on 3 November, but in a 1–3 loss at SD Ejea.

=== Almería ===
On 5 October 2020, Escobar signed a four-year contract with UD Almería in Segunda División, for a rumoured fee of €2.5 million. He made his debut for the club on 16 December, starting in a 4–1 home routing of CE L'Hospitalet, for the season's Copa del Rey.

After another cup appearance, Escobar was demoted to the reserves in Tercera División in late January 2021. On 12 July of that year, he moved to FC Barcelona B on a one-year loan deal, with a buyout clause.

Sparingly used at Barça B in Primera Federación, Escobar joined another reserve team, Betis Deportivo in Segunda Federación, also on loan on 1 September 2022. He only featured in five matches due to an ankle injury, and terminated his link with Almería on 10 July 2023.

=== Logroñés ===
On 13 July 2023, Escobar signed a one-year contract with SD Logroñés in the third division. He scored three times in his first four league matches, and ended the campaign with 11 goals, despite being unable to avoid team relegation.

=== Celta ===
On 29 July 2024, Escobar signed a five-year deal with RC Celta de Vigo, being initially assigned to the B-team also in division three. He also scored 11 goals for the side in the season, despite not being an undisputed starter.

=== AVS ===
On 30 July 2025, Celta announced Escobar's transfer to Portuguese Primeira Liga side AVS Futebol SAD, with the player signing a three-year contract. He made his professional debut on 9 August, starting in a 3–1 away loss to F.C. Arouca.

=== Huesca ===
On 16 January 2026, Escobar returned to his home country and signed a two-and-a-half-year contract with SD Huesca in the second division. He scored his first professional goal in his second match for the club, netting the winner in a 1–0 home success over Cádiz CF.

=== Ceuta ===
On 3 July 2026, after suffering relegation with Huesca, Escobar signed a one-year deal with AD Ceuta FC also in division two.

== Personal life ==
Escobar's younger brother Ismael is also a footballer. A centre-back, he too played for the youth sides of Valencia.
