= Canet de Mar =

- Municipality
- Coat of arms

- Location in Catalonia Canet de Mar (Spain)
- Coordinates: 41°35′N 2°35′E
- Country: Spain
- Community: Catalonia
- Province: Barcelona
- Comarca: Maresme

Government
  - Mayor: Pere Xirau Espàrrech (2023)

Area
  - Total: 5.6 km^{2} (2.2 sq mi)
- Elevation: 15 m (49 ft)

Population (2025-01-01)
  - Total: 15,198
  - Density: 2,700/km^{2} (7,000/sq mi)
- Demonym(s): Canetenc, canetenca
- Postal code: 08360
- Website: canetdemar.cat

Canet de Mar (Catalan pronunciation: [kəˈnɛd də ˈmaɾ]) is a municipality in the comarca of the Maresme in Catalonia, Spain. It is situated on the coast between Arenys de Mar and Sant Pol de Mar. el Corredor and el Montnegre ranges. It is a tourist centre, but is also known for the cultivation of flowers and strawberries and for having several modernist style buildings. It is served by the main N-II road along the coast, the highway C-32 and by a station on the Renfe railway line. Canet de Mar is in the province of Barcelona, 43 kilometers from Barcelona.

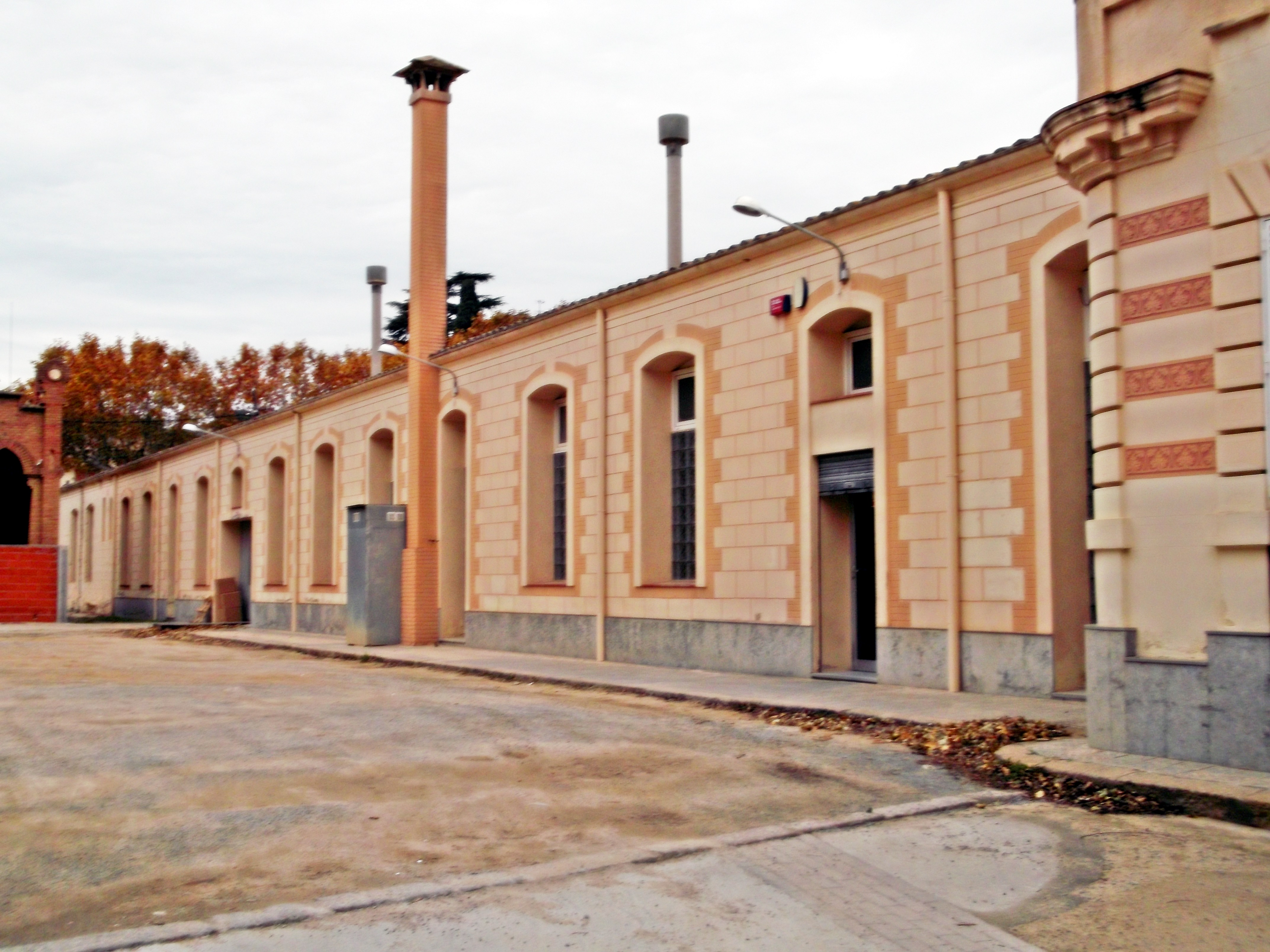
Carbonell i Reverter

== Demography ==
| 1900 | 1930 | 1950 | 1970 | 1986 | 2007 |
|---|---|---|---|---|---|
| 2899 | 4892 | 4831 | 6556 | 8667 | 14.200 |

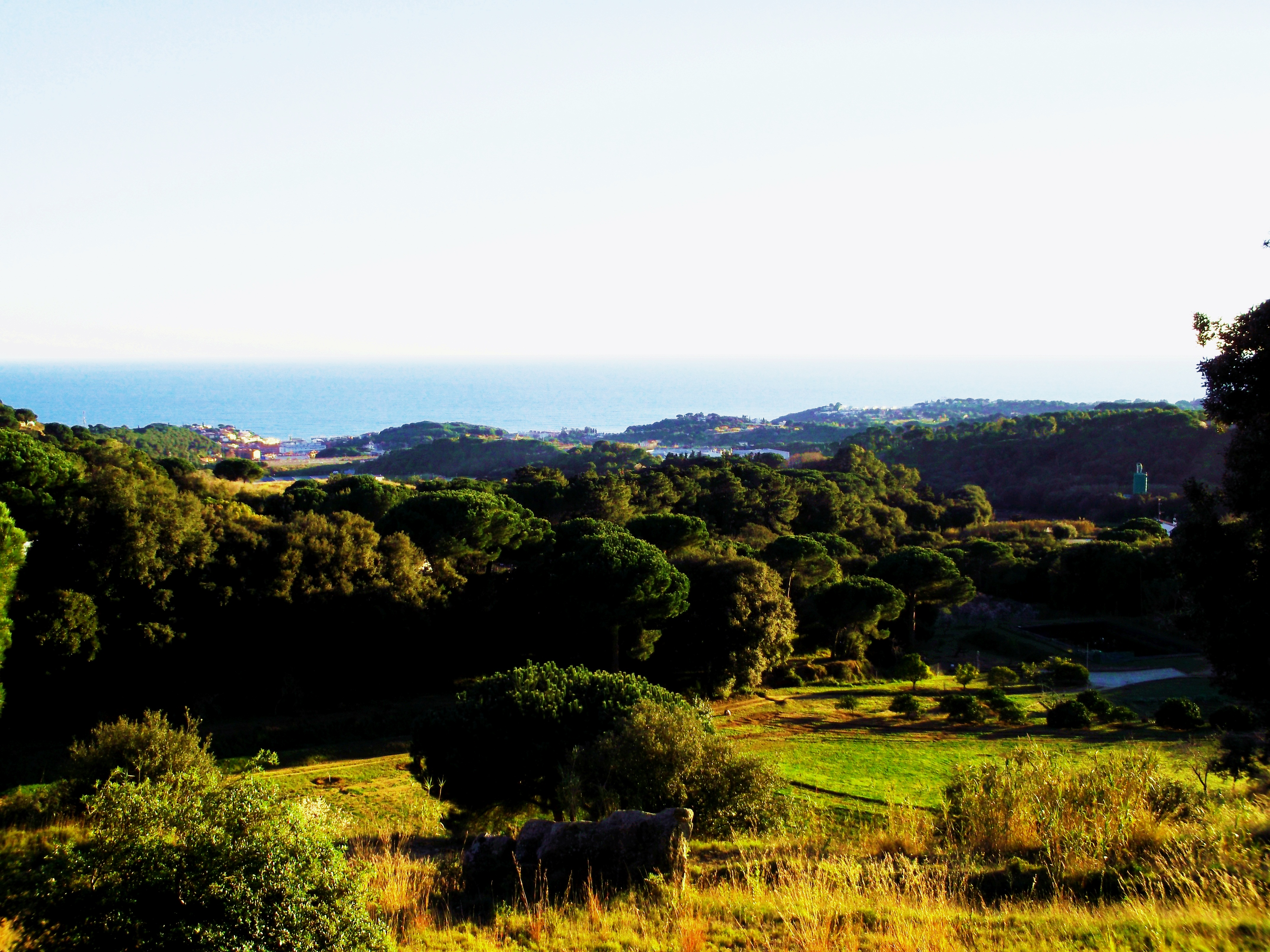
Canet des de els Tarongers

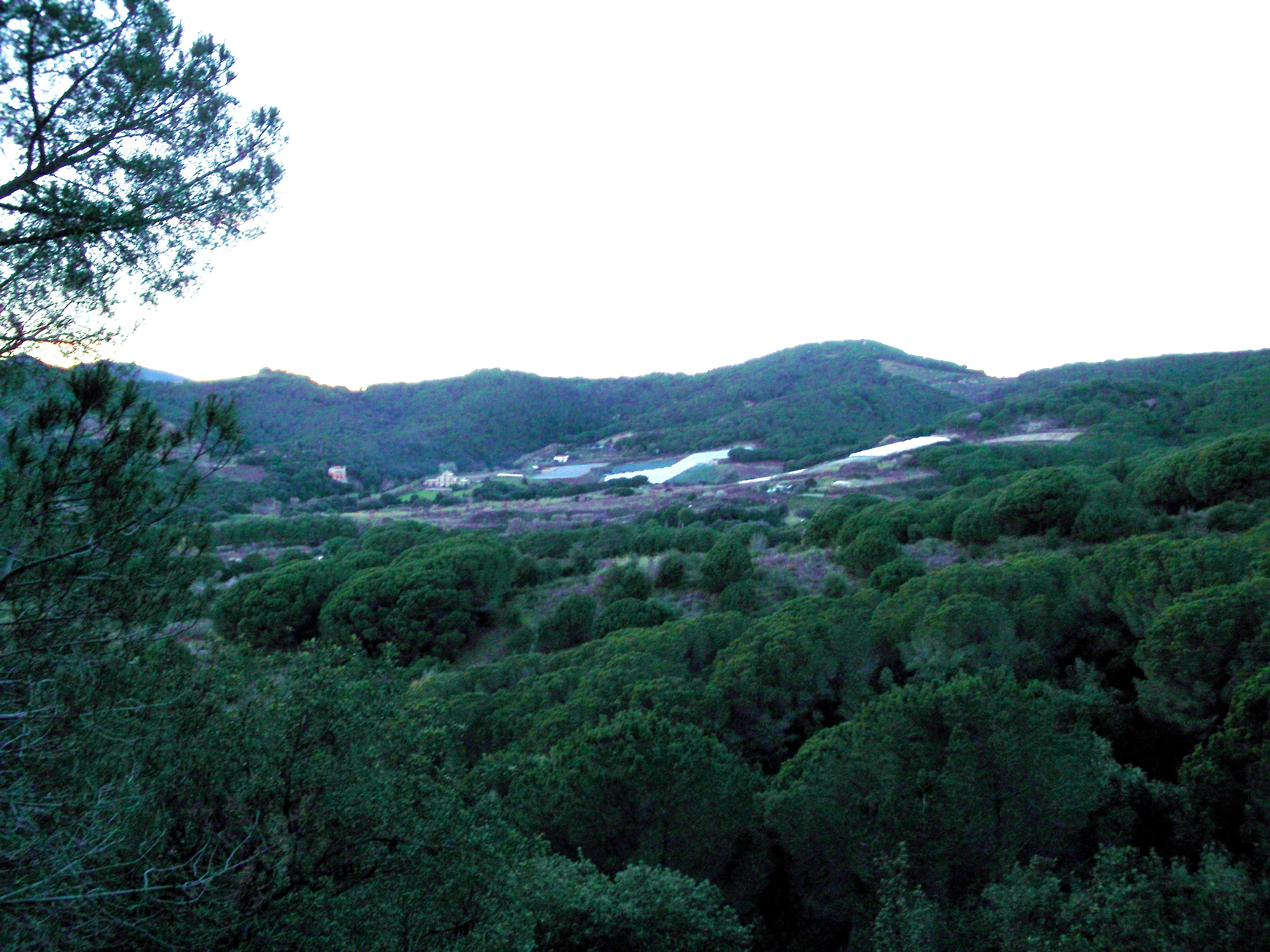
La Vall de Canet

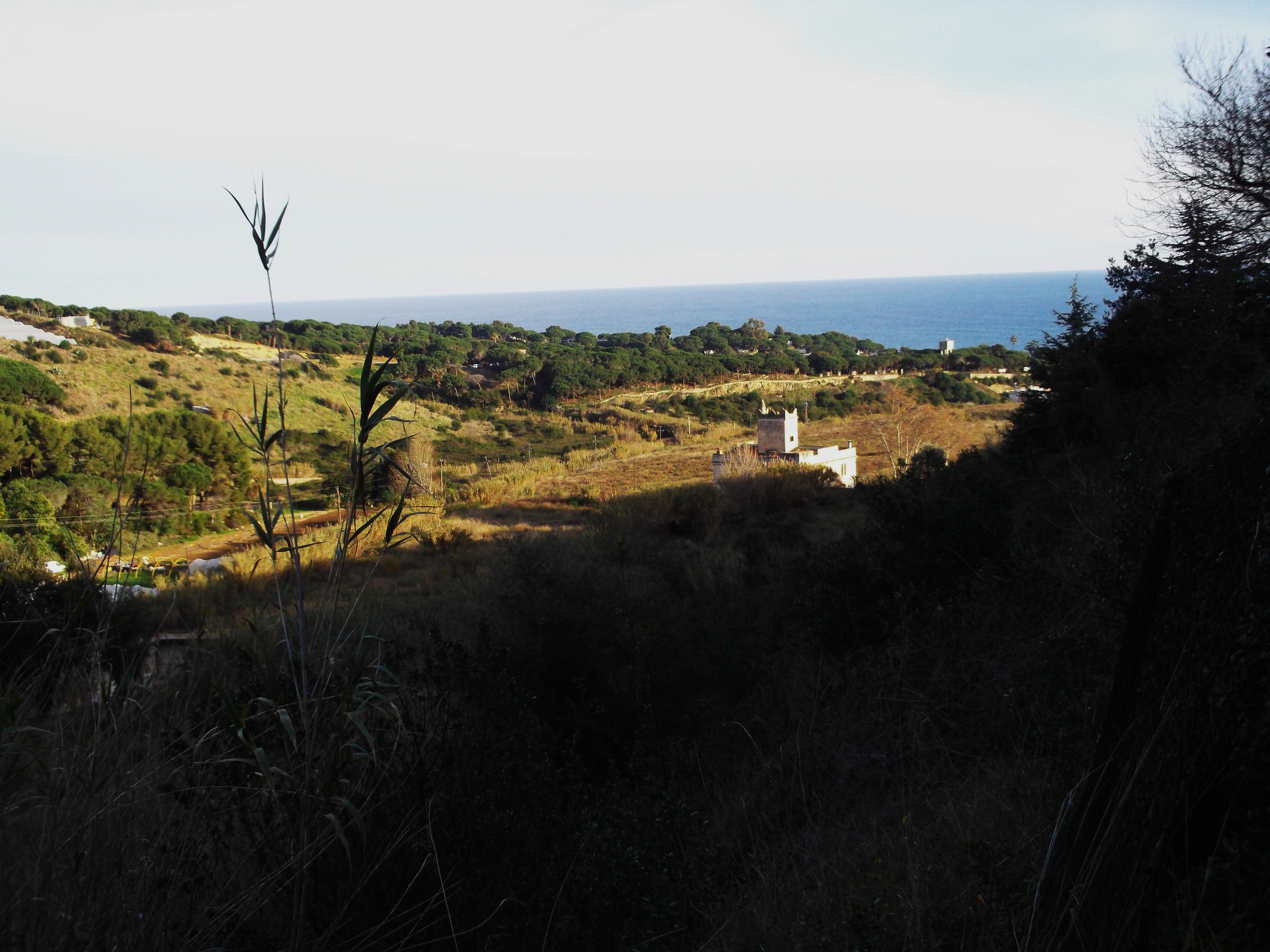
La Riera de l'Oms, Canet de Mar

=== Transport ===
The railway station belongs to en Barcelona-Mataro-Maçanet Massanes (R1) in Neighborhoods. Bus line St. Cyprian of Vallalta - Canet de Mar - Sant Pol de Mar - Calella either way, the company Sagalés. The motorway C-32 of Montgat in Palafolls and the N II on the coast of Barcelona in the Juncal.

=== Beaches ===
Canet is a municipality of Maresme Coast. Its coast consists of a sandy foundation due to the decomposition of granite rocks which form the basement Canetenc; beaches are flat and with an average width of 50m mainly golden sand and thick, and have easy access on foot or cycling. The quality of the beach strip is the protection of coastal vegetation, where there are native plants of coastal Catalonia and Maresme. They are marked with buoys 200 meters, and there are input and output channel for boats.

==== Canet Beach ====
Canet Beach is located between the beach and Cavaió, 1,500 m long and is a city beach. It has several places to eat and drink all along the seafront, and in recent years has been classified as blue flag given by the European Union.

==== Cavaió Beach ====
Cavaió Beach is located between the beach of Canet and the municipality of Arenys de Mar, 1000 m long, and is a semi-urban beach. Its composition is sandy, with granite rocks. There is a project for a promenade that links Arenys de Mar, the remodeled the coast with several breakwaters to protect the beach from storms.

=== Festivals and Cultural Events ===
- Fair Market Modernist (September)
- Twelfth Night (January 5)
- Gathering Pedracastell (May 1)
- Re-Percussion Festival for the Odeon (June)
- Feast of St. Peter (June 29)
- Magic Night, which takes place during the festival, which is an international event for the performing arts on the street
- Classical Music Festival at Castell de Santa Florentina (July–August) Catalonia
- Winter festival, the day of the Our Lady of Mercy (September 8)

== Buildings of interest ==
=== Various churches of the village ===
| Year | Name | Location | Description | Author | Image |
|---|---|---|---|---|---|
| 1579 | Esglèsia Parroquial de Sant Pere i Sant Pau | C/Carrer Esglèsia | Gothic style building, constructed from 1579 and consecrated in 1591 went to Montserrat, Benedict touch. It has a single nave and transept, apse and side chapels, one of which, most notably, is dedicated to the Blessed Sacrament. The front, engraved, rectangular portal has a niche on it. On the right stands the square tower, three-story elevation between 1793 and 1805. The architect was John Garrido, Barcelona. In 1936 the church was burned. Missed the altarpiece (by 1630) and fell the cruise. The reconstruction was made by Danish Josep Torras between 1939/46. | Onofre Enric | Ruins of the Odèon and Church of Sant Pere i Sant Pau |
| 1852 | Santuari de la Mare de Deu de la Misericòrdia | C/Ample, 38 | The devotion to Our Lady of Mercy has been documented since 1520. At that time it took from Trieste (Italy) an image of Mary who chaired the new church that was built in the town in 1591. A century later, in 1703, Mercy was to be named the patron saint of the town. Later, between 1853 and 1857, the current sanctuary was built in a Neo-Gothic building | Francesc Daniel Molina i Casamajó | Santuari de la Mare de Déu de la Misericòrdia |
| 1752 | Església de l'Hospital | C/del Mar | Baroque chapel that was part of the hospital created in the sixteenth century and rebuilt in the eighteenth. It mixtilini crown with a belfry on top. The door is segmental arch. Inside there is a mural of John Commeleran, painted after the war. | Anonymous | Església de l'Hospital |

=== Various architectural works by Lluís Domènech i Montaner ===
The summer residence of modernist architect, Lluis Domenech i Montaner (1849-1923) was situated in Canet de Mar. Montaner married a native of Canet and his family spent time at their Summer residence. Two of Montaner's sons also married girls from Canet. In his later years, Montaner retired to Canet where he worked on many of his research projects and wrote his books from the studio situated at the rear of the Montaner home.

During his time in Canet, Montaner constructed a number of buildings - most of which are still standing and in very good condition. Casa Montaner, the family home, consists of a purpose built home as well as renovations to the 16th century Masia Racosa which would become Montaner's studio. Today this complex houses a museum devoted to Montaner, the so-called "father of Modernism". Other works in the central part of town include: Ateneu de Canet and Casa Roura (now a restaurant). The Pantheon of the Montaner family is further out of town, Montaner's renovations to the Castle of Santa Florentine are examples of his work.

| Year | Name | Location | Description | Condition | Image |
|---|---|---|---|---|---|
| 1883 | Teatre Principal | Ample, 6 | In 1883 Maria Pujadas commissioned Lluís Domènech i Montane to remodel a ballroom in the town as a theater. To inaugurate it, on October 20, Domenech his Renaixença friends and the play Judith de Welp, by Àngel Guimerà, received its premier. | Disappeared | |
| 1884–1885 | Ateneu de Canet de Mar | Riera Sant Domènec, 1A | The building, on the site of an old house, has served as the headquarters of several of the town's political and cultural associations. Building of conservative lines with wrought iron railings, abundant reddish sgraffito and a rose window containing stained glass. A notable feature is the chambered corner with its dome and the lightning conductor in the form of a wrought-iron dragon. It currently houses the Canet public library. | Very good | |
| 1881–1912 | Remodelling of the Castle of Santa Florentina | Riera del Pinar s/n | This castle possibly dates from Roman times, when it would have been a centre of agricultural production. In the 11th century it became a fortified farmhouse, and this was enlarged in the 16th century with the addition of defensive works. In the late 19th century,Ramon Montaner i Vila uncle of Domenech, wanted to adapt the building to the tastes of the time. The architect gave a medieval touch to the castle with the introduction of parts of the monastery of Tallat. He also built a crypt for the tomb of Florentina Malató, wife of Ramon Montaner, who died in 1900. It has been listed as an asset of national cultural importance since 1949. The castle is one of the locations for the sixth season of Game of Thrones. | Very good | |
| 1892 | Casa Roura/Ca la Bianga | Riera Sant Domènec, 1 | Commissioned in 1889 as a residence for Jacint de Capmany and Paquita Roura, cousins of the architect, shortly after the Universal Exposition. The house is notable for being, along with Castell dels Tres Dragons, one of the first buildings to use exposed brickwork and ironwork, finished with ceramics. The materials came from the workshop of craftsmen that Domènech had in the Castell dels Tres Dragons until 1891. Today Casa Roura is a fine dining restaurant specialising in regional dishes. | Very good | |
| 1902 | Creu de Pedracastell | Way of the Cross | In 1901 Pope Leo XIII called on towns and villages to erect crosses to commemorate the new century. In 1902 a cross designed by Lluís Domènech i Montaner and promoted by Marià Serra was erected. It fell in 1926 in a gale and a copy by Pere Domènech was erected in its place, but this was destroyed during the Spanish Civil War. The existing cross dates from 1954. | Disappeared | |
| 1905 | Reform to Masia Rocosa | Chamfer rivers Gavarra and Buscarons | The house is originally of the 16th-and 17th centuries. During his residency, Domènech used this space as his personal study. In the front of the old house, is the Casa Domènech i Montaner, built as the summer residence of the Montaner family, and in a style combining both traditional and modernist elements. Today, it is a museum dedicated to Montaner and welcomes members of the public to visit. | Very good | |
| 1910 | Pantheon Domènech i Montaner | Municipal Cemetery | Commissioned to Domènech by Ricard de Capmany and Júlia Montaner. From 1915 was transferred to Domènech to bury his son there, Ricard Domènech (1892–1915). While Lluís Domènech also said he wanted to be left buried at his death, in 1923 in full dictatorship of Primo de Rivera - the family decided to stand in a niche in the cemetery of Sant Gervasi in Barcelona. Currently in the pantheon of Canet rests there, in addition to his sons Ricard Domènech and Pere Domènech, and his wife Maria Roura. Pantheon of a sobriety virtually rationalist highlighting the sculpture of Josep Llimona although it was damaged during the Spanish Civil War. | Ok | |
| 1912 | Pantheon Font-Montaner family | Municipal Cemetery | While many authors attribute to his son Pere Domènech i Roura, the documentary fund of Lluís Domènech i Montaner listed the project as a work of Lluís Domènech. It is a building flanked by four statues very schematic representing the four evangelists: John, Mark, Luke and Matthew, work by sculptor Pau Gargallo. This central body is crowned by a dome covered in decorative ceramics with predominance of white and yellow. The mosaics draw plant and floral motifs and the dome is supported by an octagonal base, wiath a columns that leave between then each space for interior lighting. | Ok | |
| 1918 | Casa Domènech i Montaner | Chamfer rivers Gavarra and Buscarons | Domènech take an old house to build this building between 1918 and 1920. The outer level is a mixture of styles, as alternate medieval elements with other more moderns. Regarded as the last modernist work of Lluís Domènech i Montaner, is now the House museum Domènech i Montaner. | Very Good | |

=== Various architectural works by Puig i Cadafalch. ===
| Year | Name | Location | Description | Condition | Image |
|---|---|---|---|---|---|
| 1898 | Restaurant of the Hermitage of la Misericòrdia | Parc de la Misericòrdia; 41°35′49.6″N 2°34′55.15″E | Storey building with typical structure of Puig i Cadafalch with neo-Gothic windows similar to Els Quatre Gats and a lookout tower typical in the modernisme towers. The decor of shades in blue tiles. | Ok | |
| 1899 | Fàbrica Carbonell Susagna | Riera Lledoners, 111; 41°35′33.56″N 2°34′57″E | The knitting factory was originally built in 1899. Joan Carbonell Reverter, son of Joan Carbonell continued the business and changed the name to Carbonell Reverter. It was designed in 1897-98 and began production called Carbonell Susagna and was promoted by industrialists Frederic Susagna and Joan Carbonell Paloma. The master builders were Martí Isern and Joan Solà. Remains just the form of entry, of brick. | Degraded | La Fàbrica Carbonell i Reverter |

=== Various architectural works by Pere Domènech i Roura. ===
| Year | Name | Location | Description | Author | Image |
|---|---|---|---|---|---|
| 1905 | Casa Carbonell | C/Ample, 38 | Owned by industrialist John Carbonell Paloma was built and renovated between 1905 and 1909. Noted for large ironwork balconies. | regular | Casa Carbonell |
| 1910 | Fàbrica Jover i Cia | c/ Riera del Pinar, 12 | It seems to be inspired by Romanesque churches through the use of brick vaults cover and blind rose window with the name of the company. | OK | Fàbrica Jover i Cia |
| 1918 | Can Floris | C/Ample, 14 | Responsible for industrial Joaquin Flores and Codina. In the middle of the front you can see the god Mercury, protector of commerce. | Regular | Can Floris |
| 1933 | Plaça del Mercat municipal | Riera Buscarons, 101 | El 1933 es va començar a construir la plaça Mercat, una de les grans reivindicacions dels comerciants dels primers anys del segle XX. | Regular | Mercat municipal |

=== Various architectural works by Eduard Ferrés i Puig ===
| Year | Name | Location | Author | Image |
|---|---|---|---|---|
| 1888 | Casa Alsina Roig | C/Riera Buscarons | Eduard Ferrés i Puig | Casa Alsina Roig |
| 1888 | Villa Flora | C/Riera Buscarons | Eduard Ferrés i Puig | Villa Flora |

== Notable people ==
- Jordi Amat (born 21 March 1992) is an Indonesian professional footballer who plays for The Indonesian Club Persija Jakarta as a central defender.
- Julian Alonso (born 2 August 1977) is a former tennis player who was ranked number 30 in the ATP World Tour and also played Davis Cup several Years and Co-captain of the Davis Cup 2015

== Education ==
The town's public schools include the primary schools Escola Turó del Drac and Escola Misericòrdia, while FEDAC Canet is a state-funded charter school. The Institut Públic Lluís Domènech i Montaner is a large public secondary school providing instruction in both Catalan and Spanish, with foreign language options including English, French, and German. The Institut Sunsi Móra is a slightly smaller public secondary school.

The International School Maresme, a private British international school, is located in Canet de Mar. It follows the National Curriculum of England and serves students from Pre-Nursey to Year 11. The campus has a private forest and sea views, promoting outdoor learning.

Canet de Mar is also home to several specialized centers for arts, textiles, and other skills. The Escola de Teixits de Canet de Mar is a textile school founded in 1922 focusing on textile research and technology transfer. The El Circ Petit is a circus school and the Escola de Dansa Natalia Prior is a dance hall.
