= Òrrius =

- Municipality
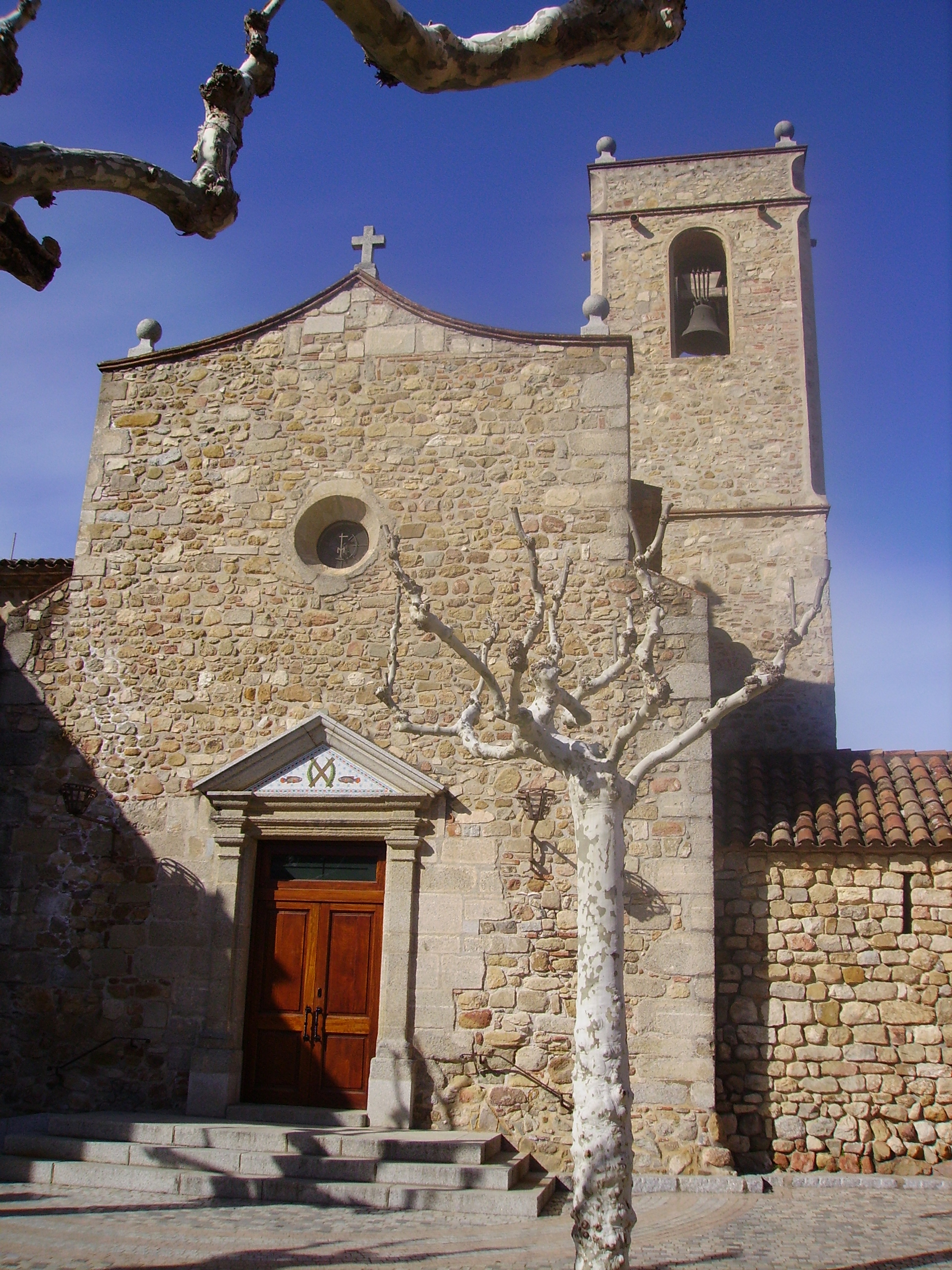
- Church of St. Andrew.

- Flag Coat of arms

- Location in Catalonia Òrrius (Spain)
- Coordinates: 41°33′27″N 2°21′21″E
- Country: Spain
- Autonomous community: Catalonia
- Province: Barcelona
- Comarca: Maresme

Government
  - Mayor: Jordi Rull Claus (2015)

Area
  - Total: 5.7 km^{2} (2.2 sq mi)
- Elevation: 269 m (883 ft)

Population (2025-01-01)
  - Total: 812
  - Density: 140/km^{2} (370/sq mi)
- Time zone: UTC+1 (CET)
  - Summer (DST): UTC+2 (CEST)
- Postal code: 08317
- Official language(s): Catalan
- Website: orrius.cat

Òrrius (Catalan pronunciation: [ˈɔriws]) is a village and municipality in the comarca of Maresme in the province of Barcelona and autonomous community of Catalonia, Spain. The municipality is delimited by La Roca del Vallès to the North, Vilassar de Dalt to the South East, Argentona to the south, and Cabrils to the southwest.

== History ==
Cited for the first time as vila de Orreos in documents from 974. This name, that has its origin in Latin, means "Barns". It formed part of the lands of the Lords of Burriac until in 1357 King Peter IV of Aragon conceded jurisdiction of the area to the Lords of Roca del Vallés.

== Main sights ==
The village is centred on the church of Sant Andreu (Saint Andrew), built in the 16th century in the late Gothic style. It is on the Latin cross plan, and has back to back chapels that were added later. There is also a small Romanesque hermitage. The bell tower is of later construction, being added to the church in 1826. In 1981 treasure, in the form of coins from the time of Berenguer Ramón II, was found within the church.

Also within the Municipality is the church of Sant Bartomeu de Cabanyes, first recorded in 1191.

== Events ==
Òrrius celebrates its fiesta mayor on 30 November, the Feast of Saint Andrew. During this fiesta peixos are eaten; a small cake, typical to the village, in the form of a fish. There is also the Festa de la Plantada del Maig, celebrated on the second Saturday of May, where a tall tree that has been carried around the village by the villagers is planted in the town square.

== Economy ==
Traditionally, the principal economic activity is agriculture. Nevertheless, the proximity of the village to Mataró means that since the 1970s the village has become home to many residents of that town. For this reason, many inhabitants work outside the village.

There is little industrial activity, though there is a small granite quarry that continues to be exploited.
