= Sant Iscle de Vallalta =

- Municipality
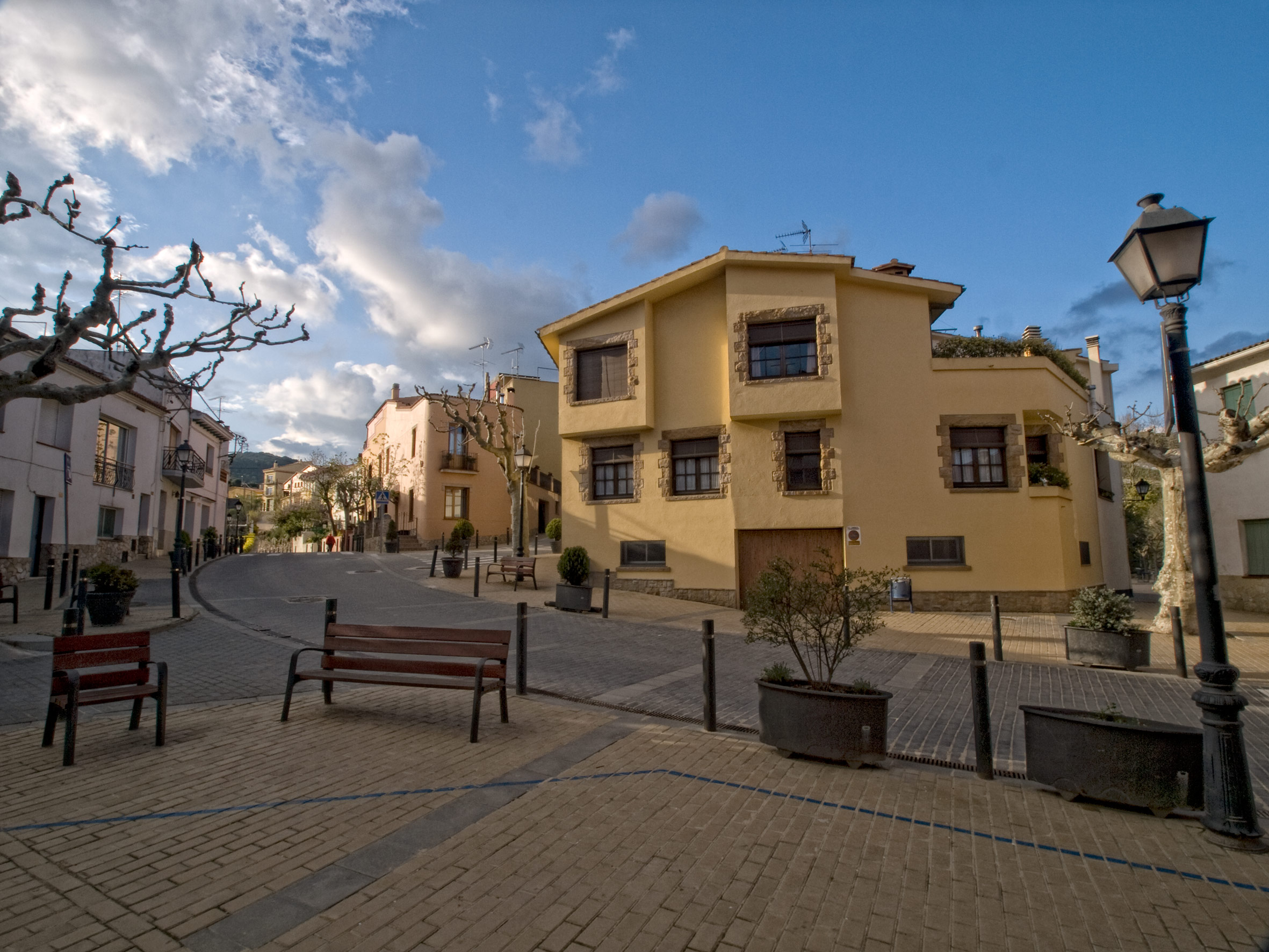

- Flag Coat of arms

- Location in Catalonia Sant Iscle de Vallalta (Spain)
- Coordinates: 41°37′30″N 2°34′12″E
- Country: Spain
- Community: Catalonia
- Province: Barcelona
- Comarca: Maresme

Government
  - Mayor: Eduard Turon Mainat (2015)

Area
  - Total: 17.8 km^{2} (6.9 sq mi)
- Elevation: 129 m (423 ft)

Population (2025-01-01)
  - Total: 1,477
  - Density: 83.0/km^{2} (215/sq mi)
- Demonym: Isclenc
- Website: www.santiscle.cat

Sant Iscle de Vallalta (Catalan pronunciation: [ˈsant ˈisklə ðə βəˈʎaltə]) is a municipality in the comarca of the Maresme in Catalonia, Spain. It is situated inland from the coast, in the valley of the Sant Pol river below the Montnegre range. A local road links the town with Arenys de Munt, Sant Cebria De Vallata and Sant Pol de Mar.
