= Cabrils =

- Municipality
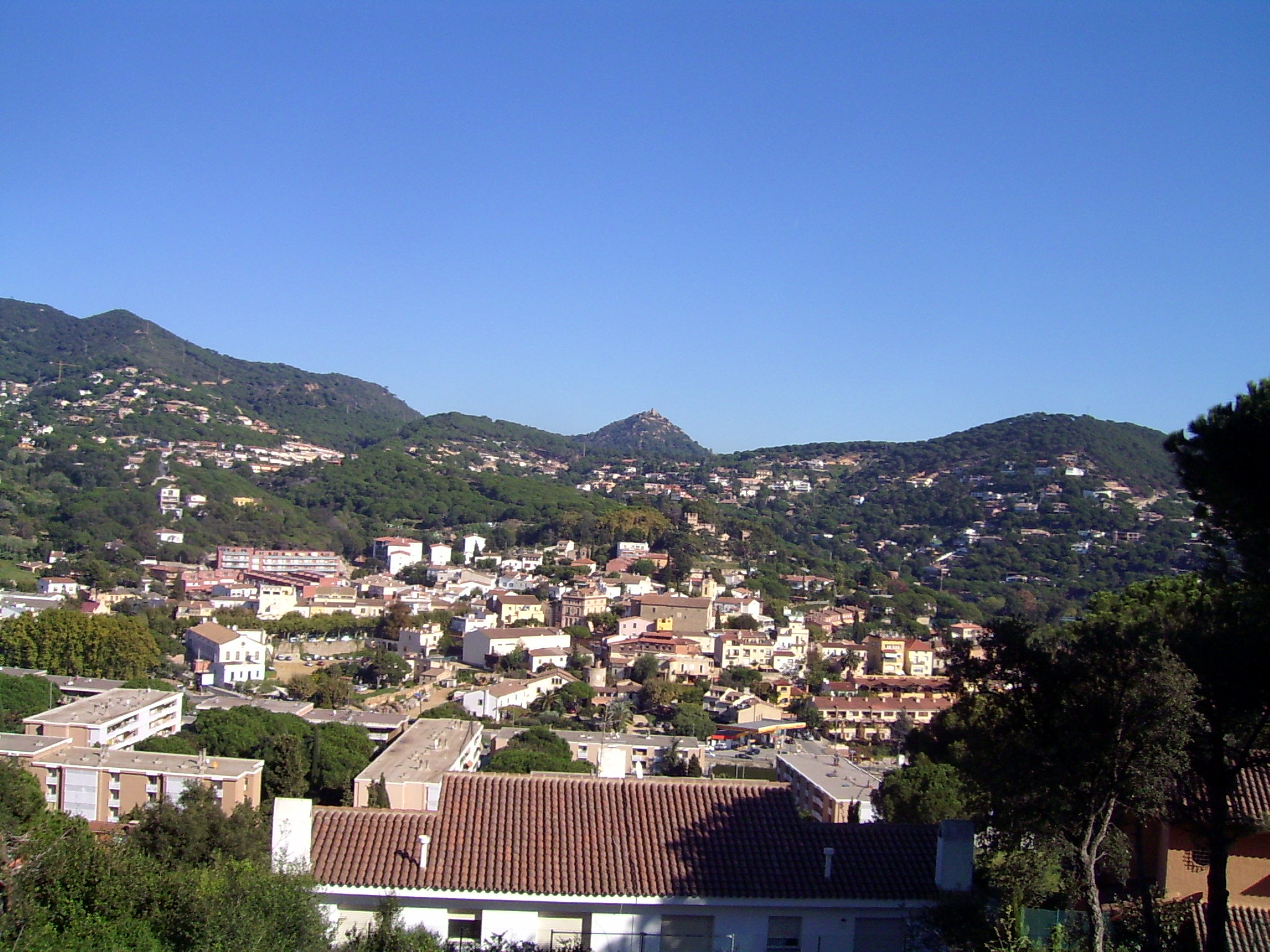

- Coat of arms

- Location within Province of Barcelona Location within Spain
- Coordinates: 41°31′34.5″N 2°22′3.7″E
- Country: Spain
- Community: Catalonia
- Province: Barcelona
- Comarca: Maresme

Government
  - Mayor: Maite Viñals Clemente (2019)

Area
  - Total: 7.0 km^{2} (2.7 sq mi)
- Elevation: 147 m (482 ft)

Population (2025-01-01)
  - Total: 7,765
  - Density: 1,100/km^{2} (2,900/sq mi)
- Demonym(s): Cabrilenc, cabrilenca
- Website: cabrils.cat

Cabrils (Catalan pronunciation: [kəˈβɾils]) is a city and municipality in the comarca of Maresme in the province of Barcelona and autonomous community of Catalonia, Spain. It is situated between the municipalities of Vilassar de Mar, Vilassar de Dalt, Òrrius, Argentona and Cabrera de Mar, about ten kilometres from Mataró, the comarca capital.

Cabrils is surrounded by the hills of Cirers and Montcabrer, among abundant forests of pines and holm oaks and is largely dominated by housing developments.

== History ==
Cabrils came into history after it was first mentioned in 1037, as a part of the jurisdiction of the neighboring castle of Vilassar de Dalt. It was under the jurisdiction of the castle until 1820, when Cabrils achieved the right to be an independent town with its own administration.

== Climate ==
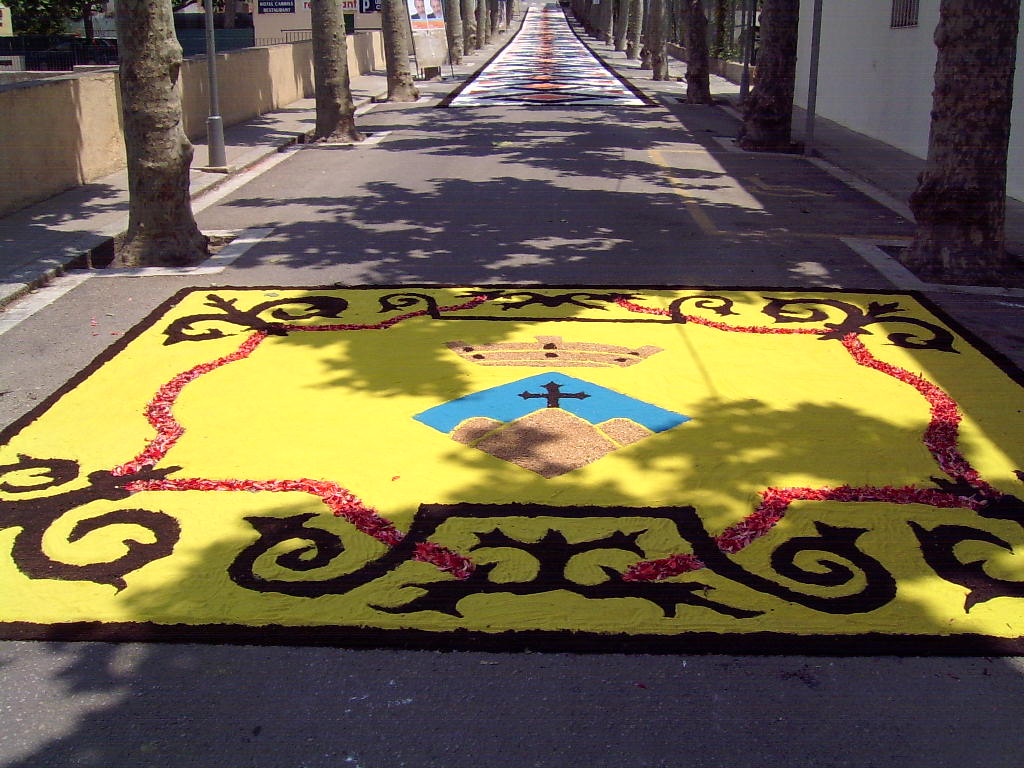
A flower carpet representing the coat of arms of Cabrils, at the Corpus Fest.

The climate of Cabrils is not unlike other Mediterranean climates, with soft temperatures in winter and a warm summer. It has an irregular regime of precipitation, with a period of drought in the months of July and August and a maximum precipitation in autumn, especially in September and October. The average annual precipitation for the period 1981-2004 was 632 mm/year, while the medium temperature of the warmest month (August) was 23,6 °C and the coldest was 9,2 °C (January). The torrential precipitation regime is frequent in autumn, having attained on some occasions values over 150 mm in a day (a fourth part of the annual medium precipitation). Its location within a valley, surrounded by hills and small mountains belonging to the Catalan pre-litoral mountain range, makes it a mild place in the summer and humid in winter.

== Economy ==
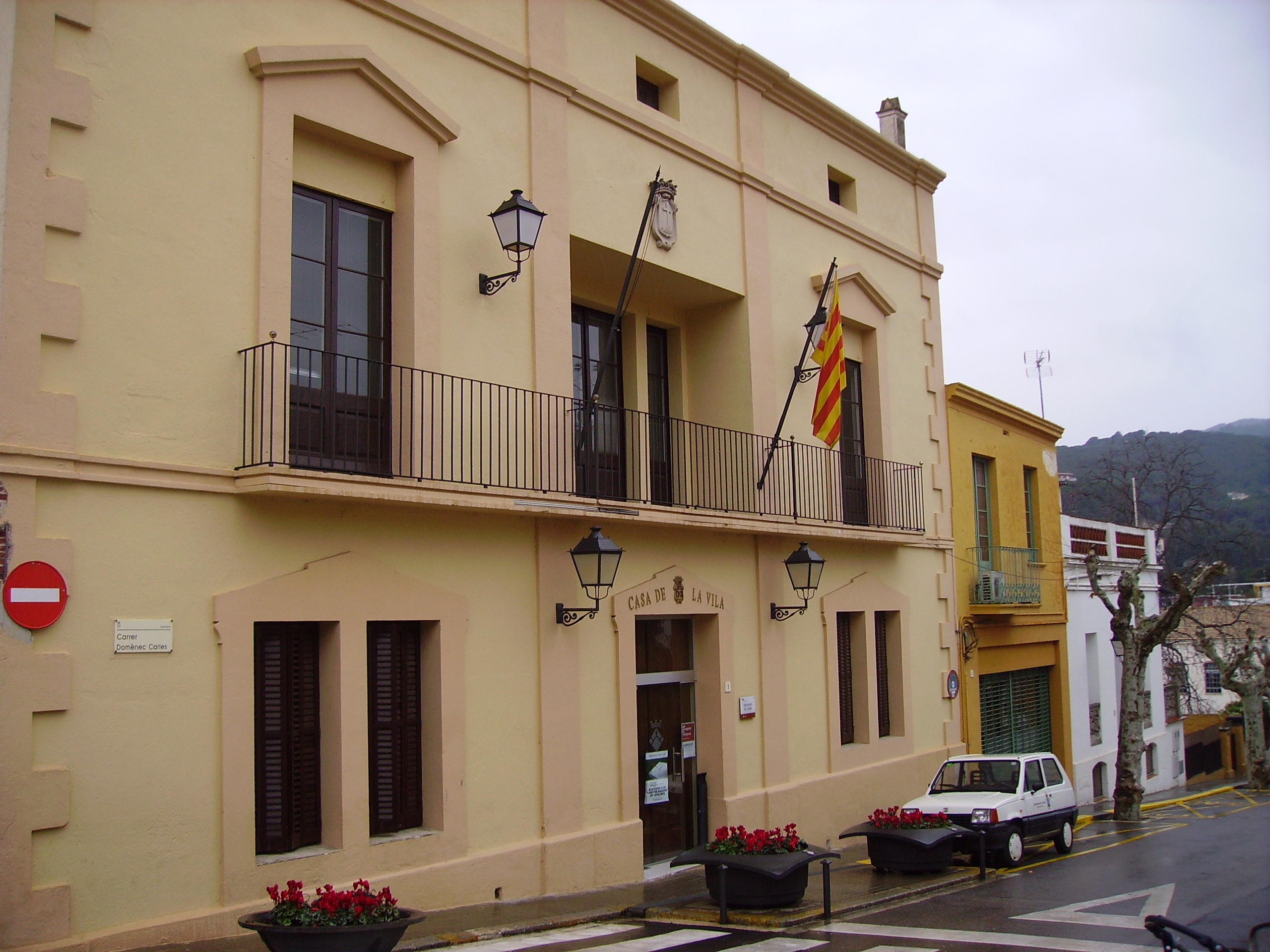
City Hall.

The traditional economy of Cabrils was based on agriculture. However beginning in the 1980s Cabrils grew its population significantly and is now primarily a residential city. Cabrils has currently the third highest income per capita in Catalonia and the eighth highest in Spain.

== Holidays ==
- Els Tres Tombs
- Festa Major - Patronal Feast Days: 3 May and 18 August
- Flower carpets on the feast of Corpus Christi: usually in June
- Mostra gastronòmica - Exhibition of Gastronomy in August
