= Acció Ciutadana de Premià de Dalt =

Acció Ciutadana de Premià de Dalt (Catalan, "Citizens Action of Premià de Dalt") is a local political formation in Premià de Dalt, province of Barcelona, Spain. The group is led by Ernest Freixas.

ACPD contested the 1999 municipal elections. It got 364 votes (8.8%) and won one seat in the municipal council. In the 2003 elections it ran on a joint list with the Socialists' Party of Catalonia (PSC) and other groups. That list got 1,446 votes (29.04%) and four seats in the municipal council.
