= Sant Cebrià de Vallalta =

- Municipality
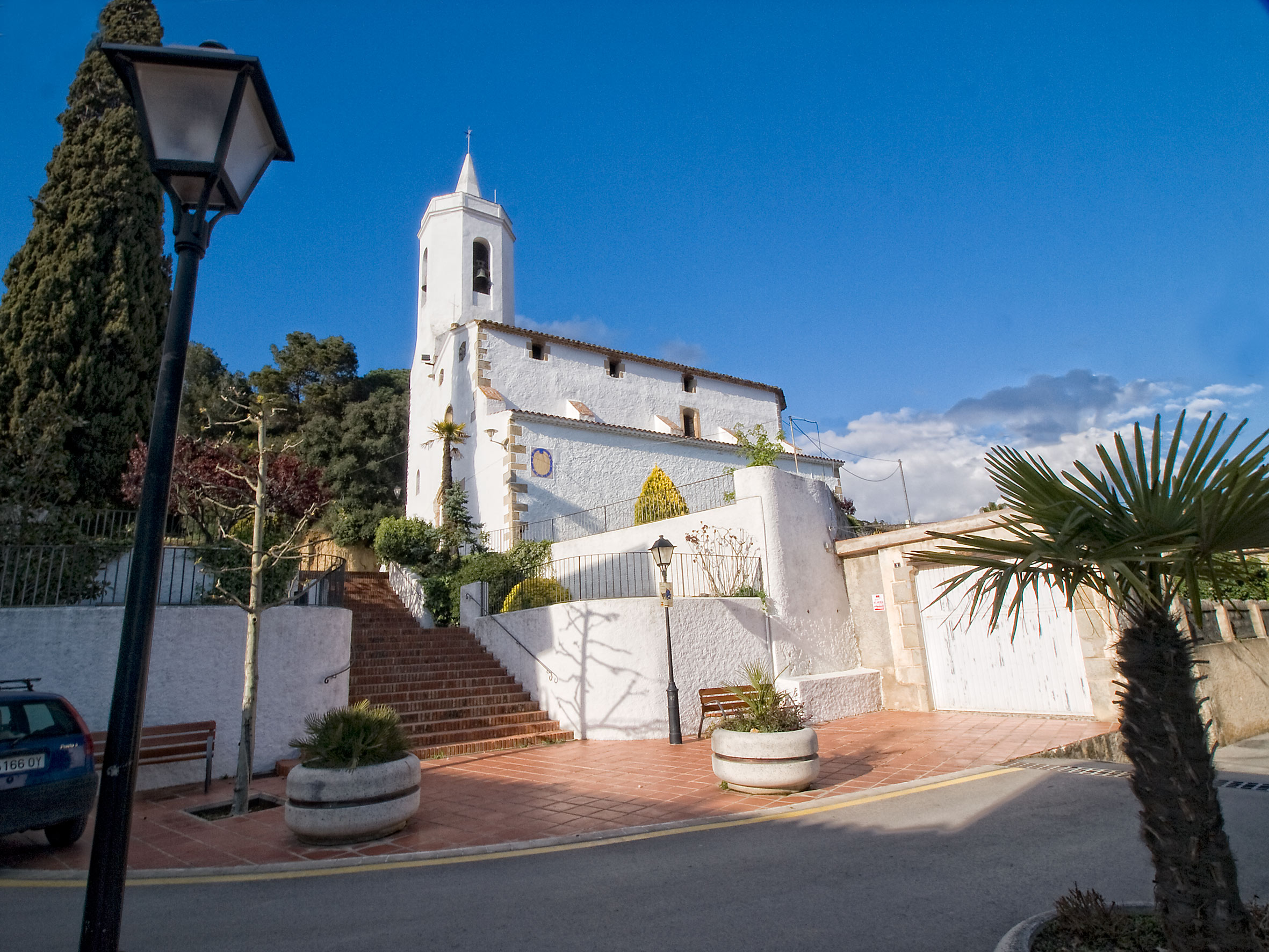
- Parish church

- Flag Coat of arms

- Location in Catalonia Sant Cebrià de Vallalta (Spain)
- Coordinates: 41°37′16″N 2°36′4″E
- Country: Spain
- Community: Catalonia
- Province: Barcelona
- Comarca: Maresme

Government
  - Mayor: Pere Vega Sánchez (2019)

Area
  - Total: 15.7 km^{2} (6.1 sq mi)
- Elevation: 71 m (233 ft)

Population (2025-01-01)
  - Total: 3,872
  - Density: 247/km^{2} (639/sq mi)
- Demonym(s): Cebrianenc, cebrianenca
- Website: stcebria.cat

Sant Cebrià de Vallalta (Catalan pronunciation: [ˈsan səβɾiˈa ðə ˌβaʎˈaltə]) is a municipality in the comarca of Maresme, in Catalonia, Spain. It is situated inland from the coast, nestled in the valley of the Sant Pol river, just below the Montnegre range. A local road links the town with Arenys de Munt and with Sant Pol de Mar.

== Demography ==
1900	1930	1950	1970	1986	2007
429	368	381	537	706	3075
