= Tiana, Catalonia =

Tiana
- Municipality
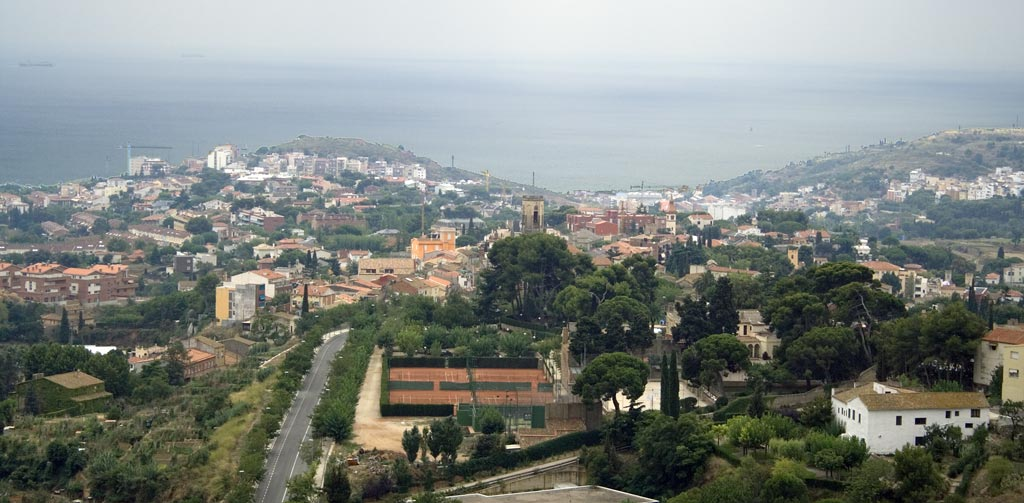

- Location in Catalonia Tiana (Catalonia) Tiana (Spain)
- Coordinates: 41°28′59″N 2°16′11″E
- Country: Spain
- Community: Catalonia
- Province: Barcelona
- Comarca: Maresme

Government
  - Mayor: Isaac Salvatierra Pujol (2022)

Area
  - Total: 8.0 km^{2} (3.1 sq mi)
- Elevation: 136 m (446 ft)

Population (2025-01-01)
  - Total: 9,331
  - Density: 1,200/km^{2} (3,000/sq mi)
- Time zone: UTC+1 (CET)
  - Summer (DST): UTC+2 (CEST)
- Website: tiana.cat

Tiana (Catalan pronunciation: [tiˈanə]) is a town situated in the east of the Province of Barcelona (Catalonia) in northeastern Spain, near the Mediterranean Sea. Its people are called tianencs in Catalan, and tianenses in Spanish. The population in 2014 was 8,314.

Its total surface is 7.96 km^{2}, with a total population density of 1024 habs/km^{2}. Its coordinates are 41° 28' N, 2° 16' E. It is 136 m above sea level and 15 km from the capital of the province, Barcelona. It is mainly a suburb of Barcelona, with some wine and cava production and, also, an alternative music festival that took place in the town in 2007, known as Tiana Winter Fest, specially dedicated to Hardcore and Metal Music.
