= Sant Vicenç de Montalt =

- Municipality
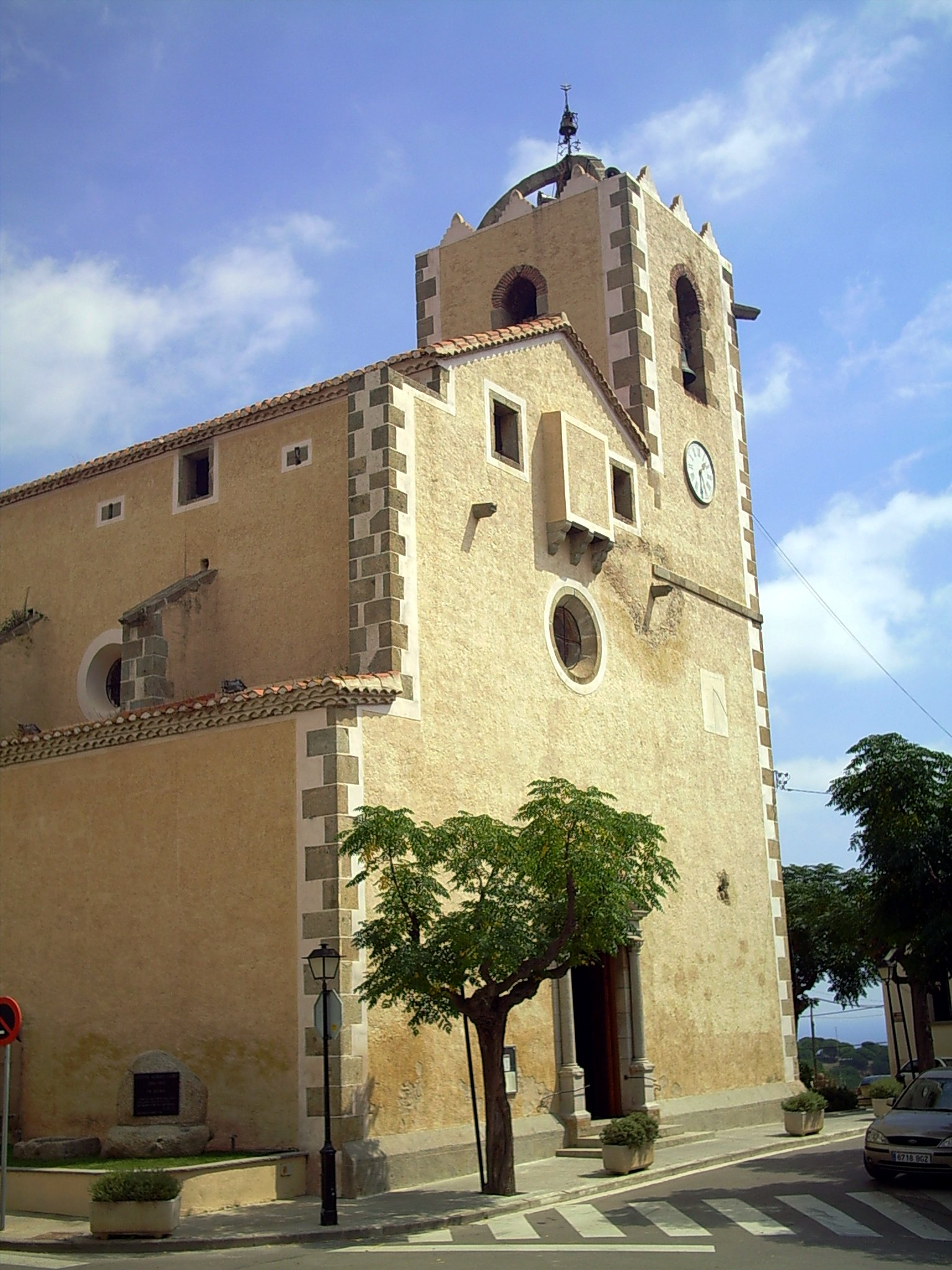

- Coat of arms

- Location in Catalonia Sant Vicenç de Montalt (Spain)
- Coordinates: 41°34′49″N 2°30′31″E
- Country: Spain
- Community: Catalonia
- Province: Barcelona
- Comarca: Maresme

Government
  - Mayor: Miquel Àngel Martínez Camarasa (2015) (CiU)

Area
  - Total: 8.0 km^{2} (3.1 sq mi)
- Elevation: 143 m (469 ft)

Population (2025-01-01)
  - Total: 6,802
  - Density: 850/km^{2} (2,200/sq mi)
- Demonym(s): Santvicentí, Xurraví, santvicentina, Xurravina
- Website: svmontalt.cat

Sant Vicenç de Montalt (Catalan pronunciation: [ˈsam biˈsɛnz ðə munˈtal]), is a municipality in the comarca of the Maresme in Catalonia, Spain. It is situated on the coast between Sant Andreu de Llavaneres and Arenys de Mar, below the el Corredor range, with the main settlement slightly inland. The main N-II road along the coast passes through the municipality, linked to the town by a local road. There are also roads to Arenys de Munt and to Mataró, and a station on the Renfe railway line at Caldes d'Estrac.

== Demography ==
1900	1930	1950	1970	1986	2007
658	823	802	939	1516	5267
