= Cabrera de Mar =

- Municipality
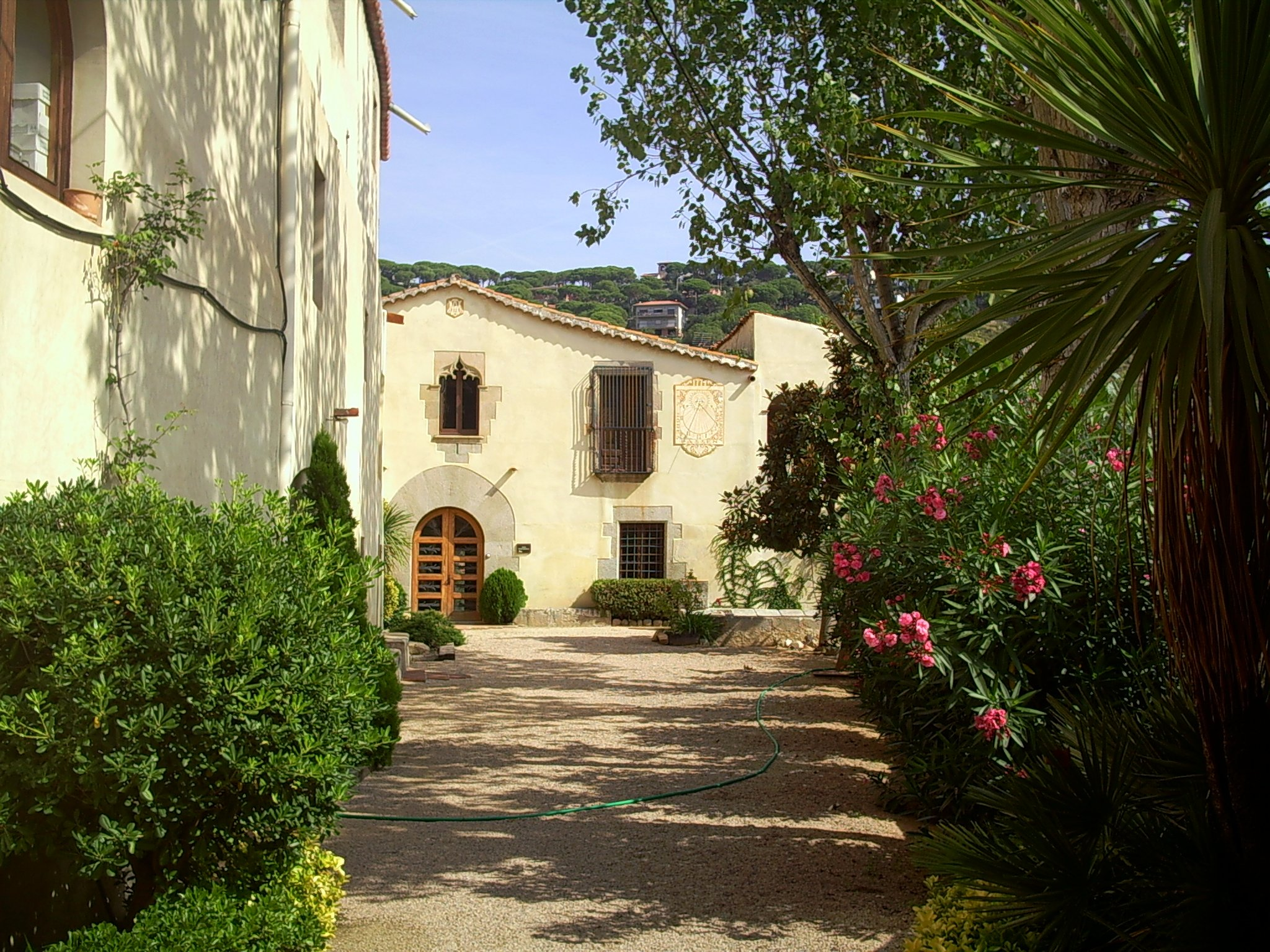

- Coat of arms

- Location in Catalonia Cabrera de Mar (Spain)
- Coordinates: 41°31′41″N 2°23′46″E
- Country: Spain
- Community: Catalonia
- Province: Barcelona
- Comarca: Maresme

Government
  - Mayor: Jordi Mir Boix (2015)

Area
  - Total: 9.0 km^{2} (3.5 sq mi)
- Elevation: 104 m (341 ft)

Population (2025-01-01)
  - Total: 5,045
  - Density: 560/km^{2} (1,500/sq mi)
- Demonym: Cabrerenc
- Postal code: 08349
- Website: cabrerademar.cat

Cabrera de Mar (Catalan pronunciation: [kəˈβɾeɾə ðə ˈmaɾ]) is a municipality of the comarca of Maresme in Catalonia, Spain.

It is located on the coast of the Mediterranean Sea, between the municipalities of Vilassar de Mar and Mataró, although the urban centre is at about 2.5 kilometres (1.6 mi) inland, in a small valley between the hills of Burriac (where the remains of the Sant Vicenç de Burriac castle are located) and Montcabrer. It also borders with the municipalities of Cabrils and Argentona.

The population is scattered in several nucleus of different origins. The casc antic (main centre), Agell (also known as Santa Elena d'Agell), Sant Joan de Munt and Mas Terrillo are located inland, whereas Pla de l'Avellà, Costamar and Bonamar are located on the coast.

The town centre has buildings in a wide range of styles: neoclassical, modernista, noucentista and simply eclectic.

Like almost all municipalities of Maresme, Cabrera de Mar has been historically very well connected with the rest of the comarca and with Barcelona thanks to the old Camí Ral (Royal Way) (actual N-II main road) and railroad (Barcelona-Mataró railroad route (1848) was the first to be constructed in all the Iberian Peninsula). Communications have been enhanced in recent years with the construction (1969) of the C-32's Barcelona-Mataró section, also the first autopista (highway) to be constructed in all the Iberian Peninsula.
