= Caldes d'Estrac =

- Municipality
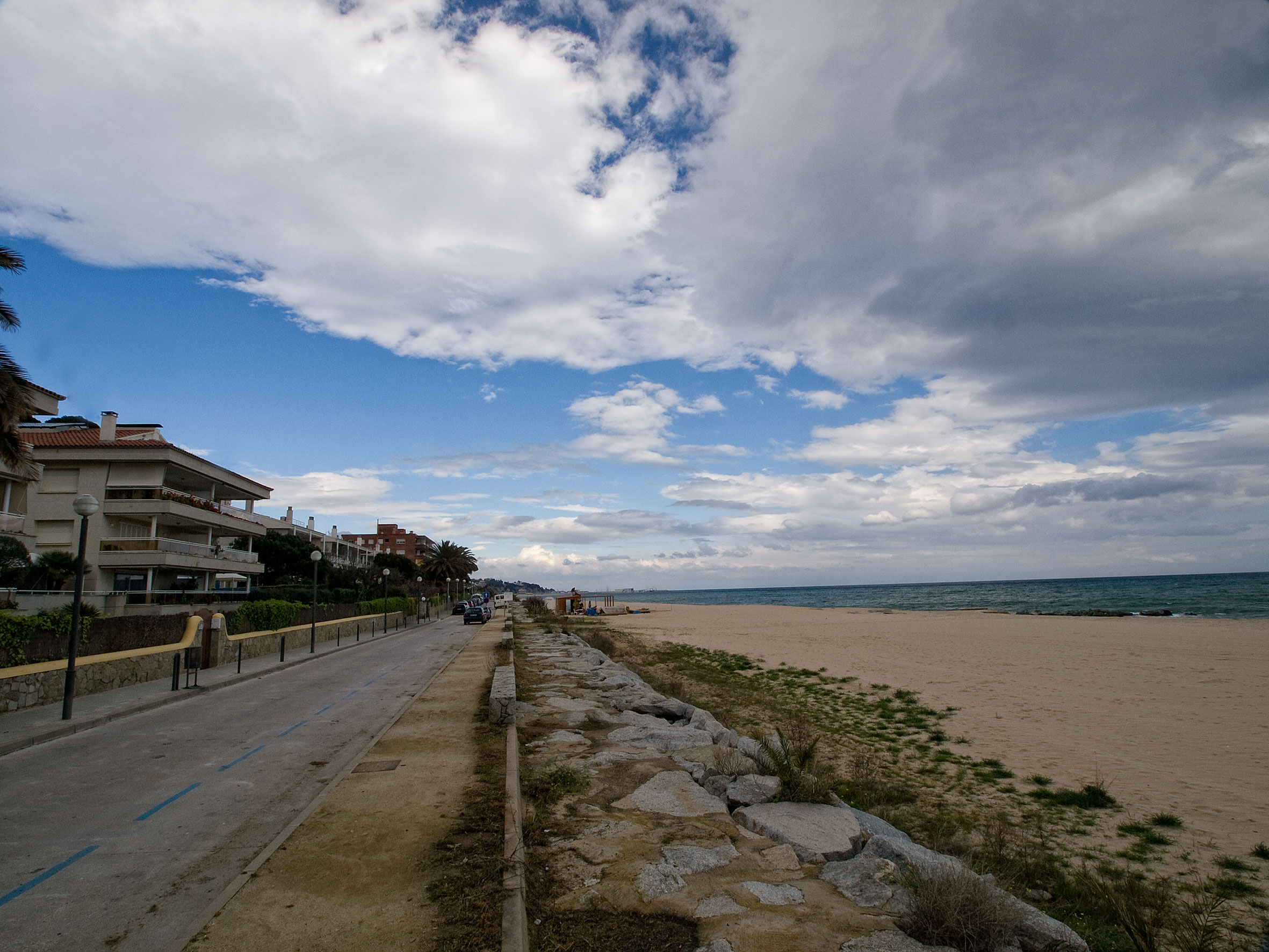

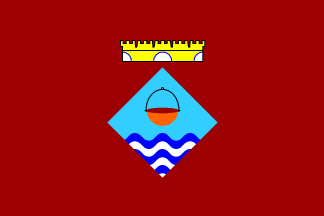
- Flag Coat of arms

- Location in Spain
- Coordinates: 41°34′19″N 2°31′43″E
- Country: Spain
- Community: Catalonia
- Province: Barcelona
- Comarca: Maresme

Government
  - Mayor: Elisabeth Segura Gubern (2025) (JxC)

Area
  - Total: 0.9 km^{2} (0.35 sq mi)
- Elevation: 33 m (108 ft)

Population (2025-01-01)
  - Total: 3,356
  - Density: 3,700/km^{2} (9,700/sq mi)
- Demonym: Caldenc
- Postal code: 08393
- Website: caldetes.cat

Caldes d'Estrac (Catalan pronunciation: [ˈkaldəz ðəsˈtɾak], also known as Caldetes pronounced [kəlˈdɛtəs]) is a municipality in the comarca of Maresme in Catalonia, Spain. It is situated on the coast between Sant Vicenç de Montalt and Arenys de Mar. It is served by the main N-II road along the coast and by a station on the Renfe railway line.

Caldes d'Estrac was a fashionable spa town for the Barcelona bourgeoisie between 1875 and the 1920s for its thermal baths and beachside atmosphere. The massive flyover road built in the 1960s and the building of suburban residences in the 1990s did away with much of the quiet of the town.

== Climate ==
Climate data for Caldes d'Estrac (data from 1931–1966)
Month	Jan	Feb	Mar	Apr	May	Jun	Jul	Aug	Sep	Oct	Nov	Dec	Year
Mean daily maximum °C (°F)	11.7 (53.1)	12.8 (55.0)	14.8 (58.6)	17.2 (63.0)	20.4 (68.7)	23.9 (75.0)	26.7 (80.1)	27.3 (81.1)	24.4 (75.9)	20.0 (68.0)	15.7 (60.3)	12.8 (55.0)	19.0 (66.2)
Daily mean °C (°F)	8.3 (46.9)	9.2 (48.6)	11.3 (52.3)	13.7 (56.7)	17.0 (62.6)	20.6 (69.1)	23.3 (73.9)	23.9 (75.0)	21.3 (70.3)	17.0 (62.6)	12.6 (54.7)	9.7 (49.5)	15.7 (60.3)
Mean daily minimum °C (°F)	5.0 (41.0)	5.7 (42.3)	7.9 (46.2)	10.1 (50.2)	13.6 (56.5)	17.3 (63.1)	19.9 (67.8)	20.4 (68.7)	18.3 (64.9)	14.0 (57.2)	9.5 (49.1)	6.6 (43.9)	12.4 (54.3)
Source: Sistema de Clasificación Bioclimática Mundial

== Sources ==
- Panareda Clopés, Josep Maria; Rios Calvet, Jaume; Rabella Vives, Josep Maria (1989). Guia de Catalunya, Barcelona: Caixa de Catalunya. ISBN 84-87135-01-3 (Spanish). ISBN 84-87135-02-1 (Catalan).
