= Maresme =

Coordinates: 41°31′N 2°18′E

- Comarca
- Coat of arms

- Country: Spain
- Autonomous community: Catalonia
- Province: Barcelona
- Region: Àmbit metropolità de Barcelona
- Capital: Mataró
- Municipalities: List: Alella, Arenys de Mar, Arenys de Munt, Argentona, Cabrera de Mar, Cabrils, Caldes d'Estrac, Calella, Canet de Mar, Dosrius, Malgrat de Mar, El Masnou, Mataró, Montgat, Òrrius, Palafolls, Pineda de Mar, Premià de Dalt, Premià de Mar, Sant Andreu de Llavaneres, Sant Cebrià de Vallalta, Sant Iscle de Vallalta, Sant Pol de Mar, Sant Vicenç de Montalt, Santa Susanna, Catalonia, Teià, Tiana, Tordera, Vilassar de Dalt, Vilassar de Mar

Government
  - Body: Maresme Comarcal Council
  - President: Francesc Alemany (ERC)

Area
  - Total: 398.6 km^{2} (153.9 sq mi)

Population (2014)
  - Total: 437,919
  - Density: 1,099/km^{2} (2,845/sq mi)
- Demonyms: maresmenc (m.) maresmenca (f.)
- Time zone: UTC+1 (CET)
  - Summer (DST): UTC+2 (CEST)
- Largest municipality: Mataró

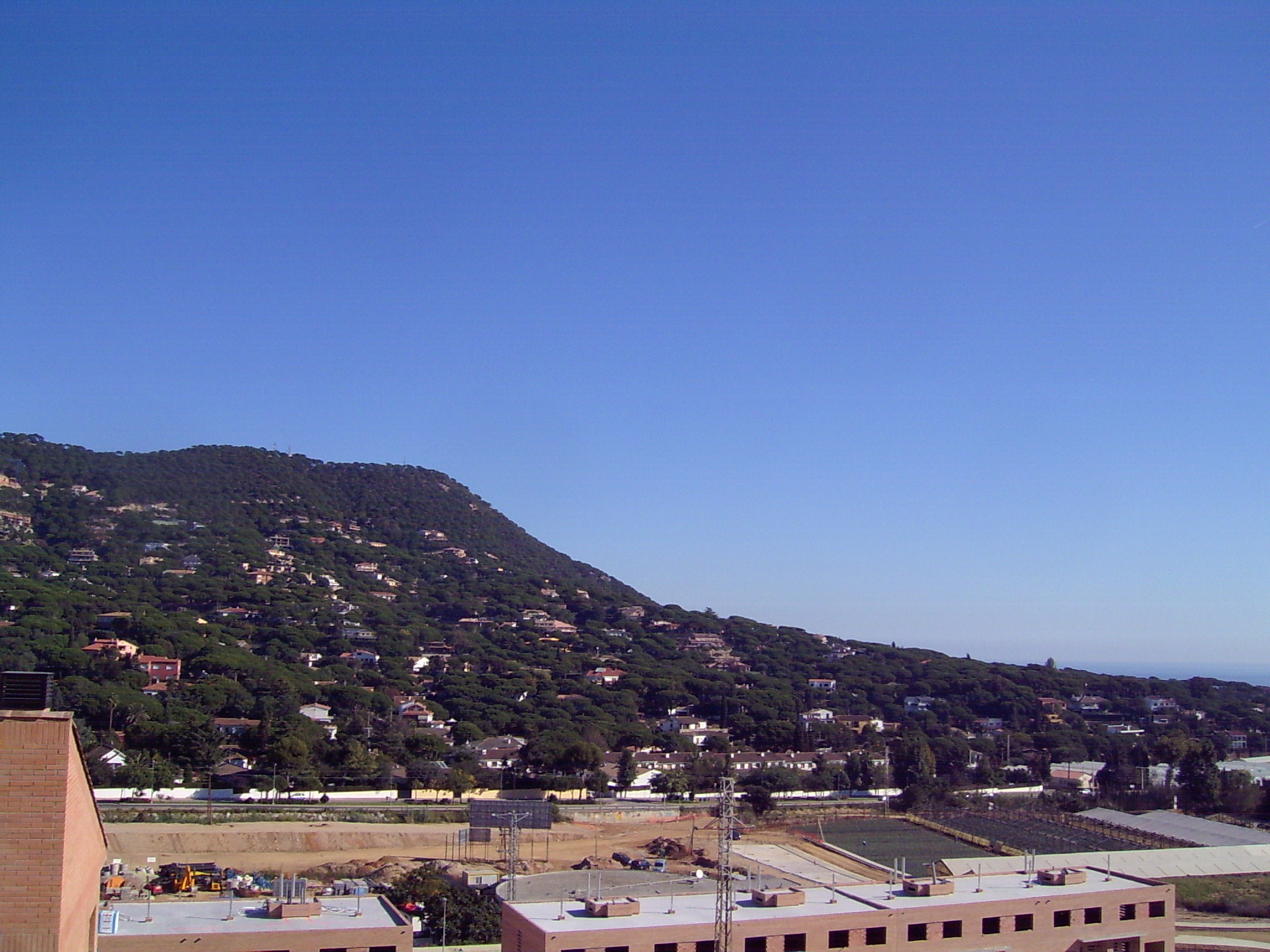
Montcabrer, comarca of the Maresme

Maresme (Catalan pronunciation: [məˈɾɛzmə]) is a comarca (county) in the Barcelona region in Catalonia. It extends from Montgat in the southwest to the Tordera River in the northeast, between the Mediterranean Sea and the Catalan Coastal Range.

The Maresme has an area of approximately 399 km^{2} and about 50 km of coastline, consists of 30 municipalities. Its capital and largest city is Mataró (pop. 119,035 in 2007).

The comarca was established as an administrative unit in 1937, following the 1936 territorial division of Catalonia, and its 30 municipalities were ratified in 1987.

As of 1 January 2025, Maresme had 477,375 inhabitants, of whom 66,641 were foreign nationals, representing 13.96% of the population.

== Geography ==
Maresme occupies a long and narrow area between the Mediterranean Sea and the hills of Serralada Litoral (Catalonia's coastal mountains), and specifically Montnegre's and Corredor's hills in the northern half and Sant Mateu's hills in the southern half. This particular shape has conditioned both the geography and the history of this comarca. Probably the main distinct elements of its geography are the characteristic rieres (torrents). These short, intermittent streams, which cross the comarca transversally about every hundred meters, produce powerful and dangerous floods when it rains.

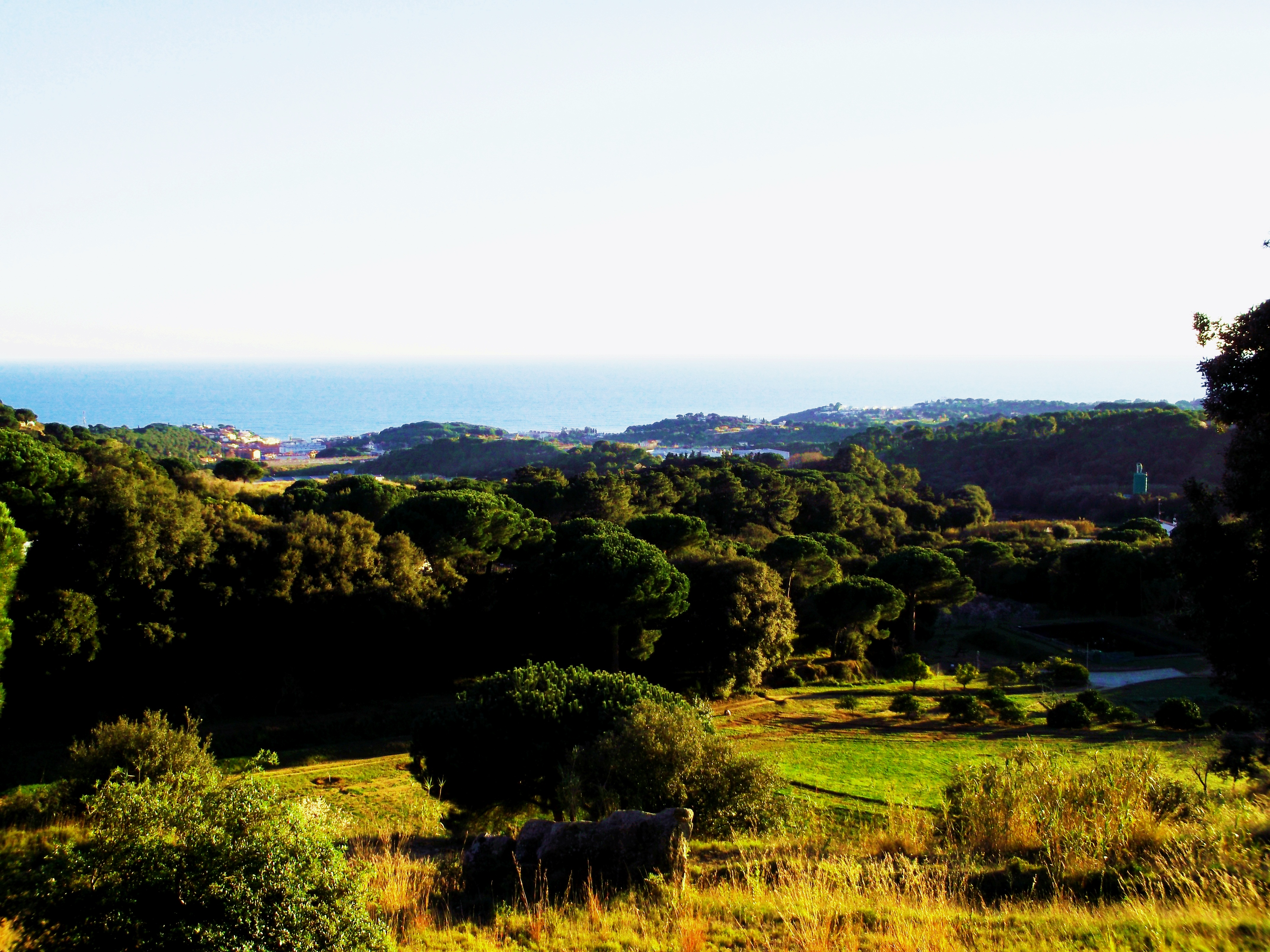
Canet des de els Tarongers

Maresme has been historically very well connected with the rest of the comarca as well as with Barcelona by the old Camí Ral (Royal Way) (current N-II main road) and railroad (The Barcelona–Mataró railroad route, finished in 1848, was the first ever in all the Iberian Peninsula). Communications were enhanced in recent years with the construction of the C-32's Barcelona–Mataró section (1969), which was the first autopista (highway) ever in Spain, and its subsequent enlargement, the Mataró-Palafolls's section (1995).

== Municipalities ==
Municipality	Population (2014)	Area km^{2}
Alella	9,651	9.6
Arenys de Mar	15,307	6.8
Arenys de Munt	8,654	21.3
Argentona	11,963	25.4
Cabrera de Mar	4,525	9.0
Cabrils	7,197	7.0
Caldes d'Estrac	2,738	0.9
Calella	18,307	8.0
Canet de Mar	14,123	5.6
Dosrius	5,137	40.7
Malgrat de Mar	18,417	8.8
El Masnou	22,742	3.4
Mataró	124,280	22.5
Montgat	11,315	2.9
Òrrius	690	5.7
Palafolls	9,065	16.6
Pineda de Mar	25,948	10.7
Premià de Dalt	10,311	6.6
Premià de Mar	28,163	2.1
Sant Andreu de Llavaneres	10,590	11.8
Sant Cebrià de Vallalta	3,328	15.7
Sant Iscle de Vallalta	1,304	17.8
Sant Pol de Mar	4,997	7.5
Sant Vicenç de Montalt	6,007	8.0
Santa Susanna	3,293	12.6
Teià	6,141	6.6
Tiana	8,314	8.0
Tordera	16,345	84.1
Vilassar de Dalt	8,882	8.9
Vilassar de Mar	20,185	4.0
• Total: 30	437,919	398.6

Map
