= Argentona Water Jug Museum =

Museum in Argentona, Spain

Coordinates: 41°33′14.71″N 02°24′01.87″E

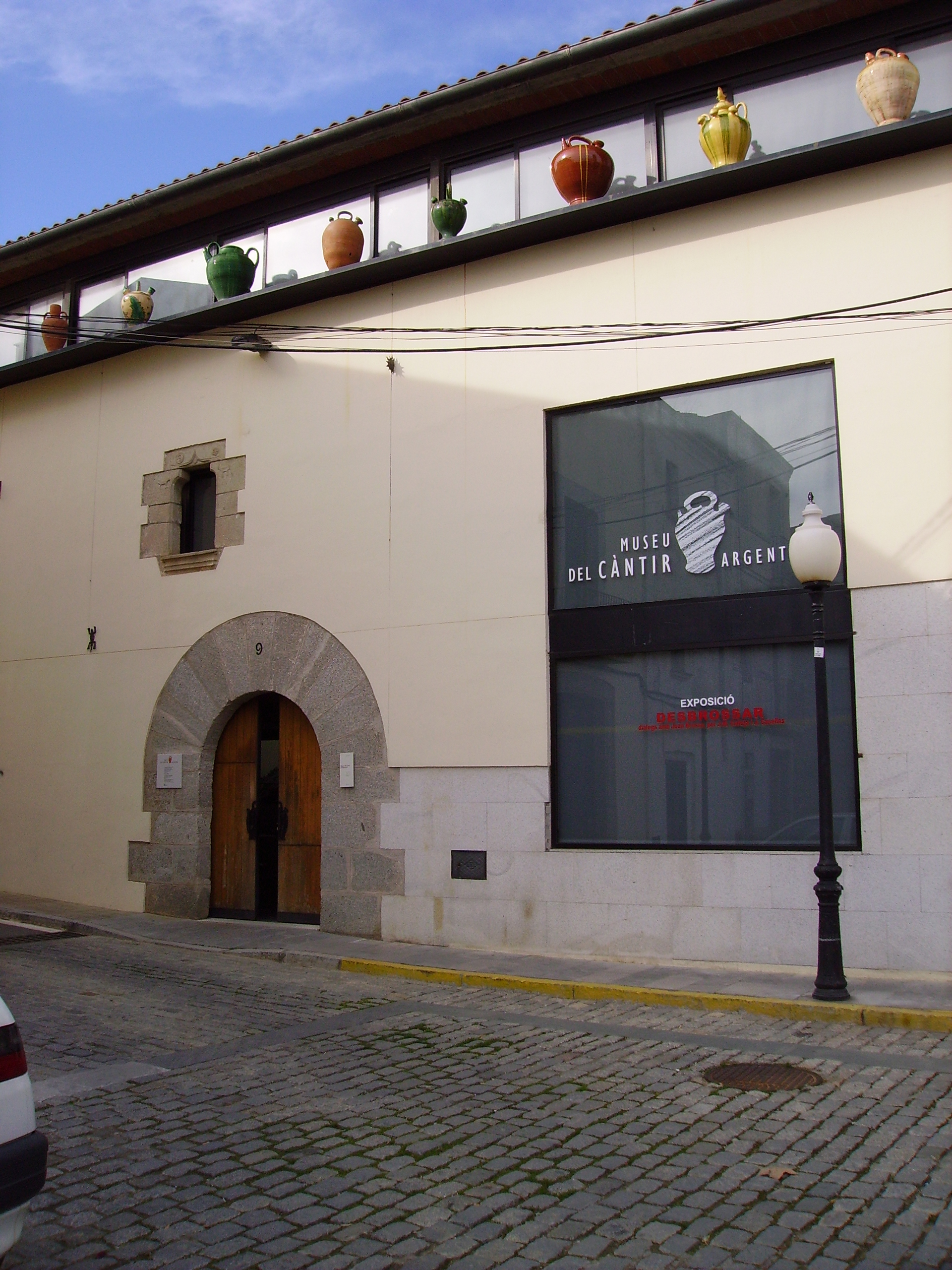
Front of the Argentona Water Jug Museum

The Argentona Water Jug Museum (Catalan: Museu del Càntir d'Argentona), in Barcelona, founded in 1975, is located in a building which opened on 20 July 2000. The origins of the museum can be found in the Water Jug Festival, which is celebrated on 4 August every year since 1951, upholding a traditional celebration dating back to the 17th century, brought about by a ‘vow of the town' to Saint Dominic, patron saint of water, to protect Argentona from a grave pestilence. Every year, coinciding with the Water Jug Festival, the Water Jug Museum organises the International Ceramic and Pottery Festival, the dates of which vary according to the day on which 4 August falls, in order to disseminate and promote the conservation of traditional pottery and the new values of the ceramics being produced.

== Exhibition ==
The collection includes more than 3,000 water vessels. The permanent exhibition introduces us to the world of these water vessels and the history, typology and process of water jug making. Monographic exhibitions are located on the second floor of the museum.

In July 2006, the Espai Picasso (Picasso Area) was opened, which displays four water jugs by the talented artist from Malaga and explains the relationship Pablo Picasso had with ceramics.
