= Palafolls =

- Municipality
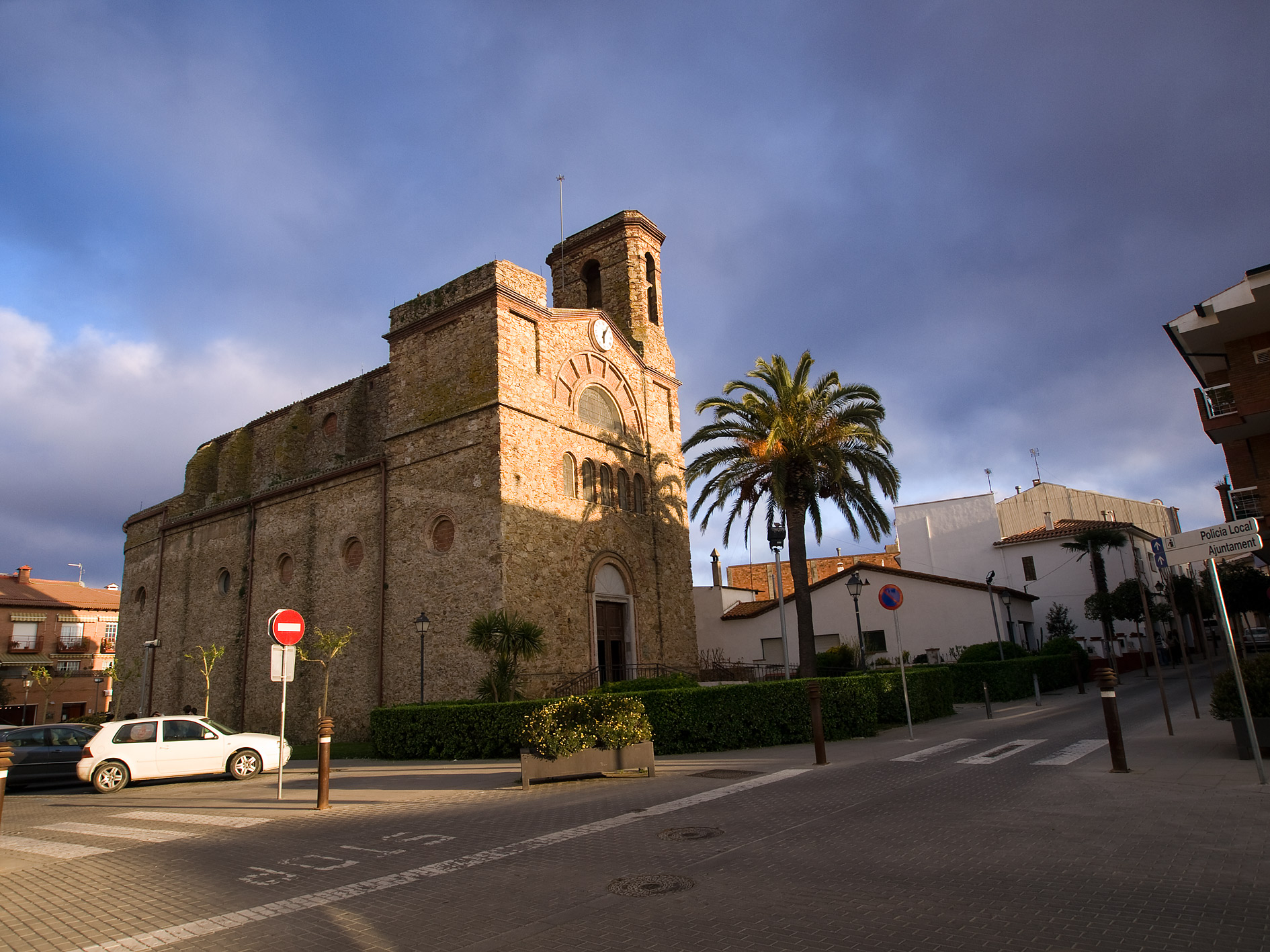
- Parish church of Santa Maria

- Flag Coat of arms

- Location in Catalonia Palafolls (Spain)
- Coordinates: 41°40′09″N 2°45′2″E
- Country: Spain
- Community: Catalonia
- Province: Barcelona
- Comarca: Maresme

Government
  - Mayor: Francesc Alemany (2019) (ERC)

Area
  - Total: 16.6 km^{2} (6.4 sq mi)
- Elevation: 16 m (52 ft)

Population (2025-01-01)
  - Total: 10,038
  - Density: 605/km^{2} (1,570/sq mi)
- Demonym: Palafollenc
- Postal code: 08389
- Website: www.palafolls.cat

Palafolls (Catalan pronunciation: [pələˈfɔʎs]) is a municipality in the province of Barcelona, Catalonia, eastern Spain.

== Twin towns ==
- Poppi, Italy, since 1990
- Ax-les-Thermes, France
