= Argentona =

- Municipality
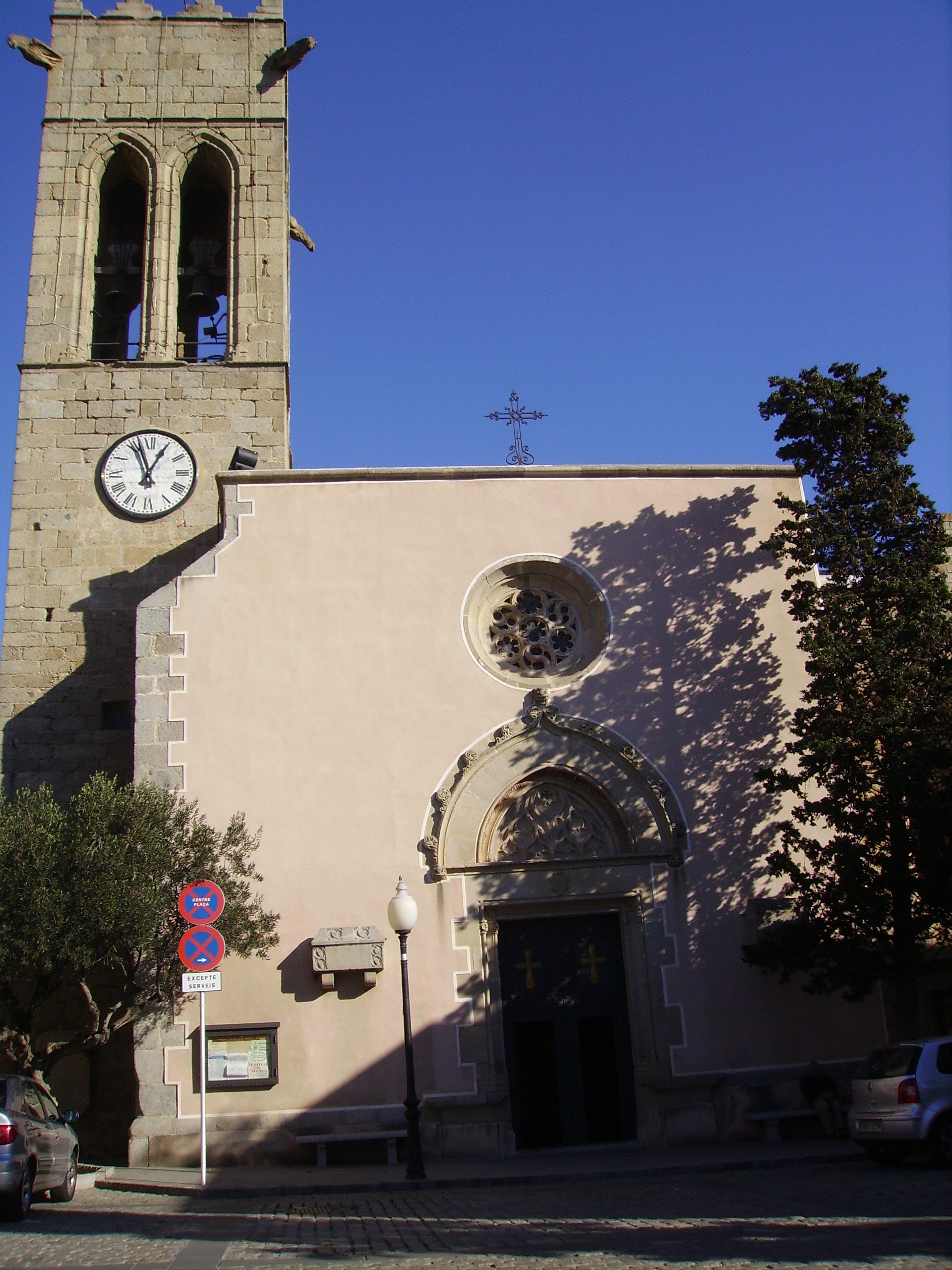

- Flag Coat of arms

- Location in Catalonia Argentona (Spain)
- Coordinates: 41°33′N 2°24′E
- Country: Spain
- Community: Catalonia
- Province: Barcelona
- Comarca: Maresme

Government
  - Mayor: Eudald Calvo Català (2015)

Area
  - Total: 25.4 km^{2} (9.8 sq mi)
- Elevation: 88 m (289 ft)

Population (2025-01-01)
  - Total: 12,891
  - Density: 508/km^{2} (1,310/sq mi)
- Demonym(s): Argentoní, argentonina
- Website: argentona.cat

Argentona (Catalan pronunciation: [əɾʒənˈtonə]) is a municipality in the comarca of the Maresme in Catalonia, Spain. It is situated on the south-east side of the granite littoral zone, to the north-west of Mataró. The town is both a tourist centre and a notable horticultural centre. A local road links the municipality with Cabrera de Mar and with the main N-II road at Vilassar de Mar.

The town centre has buildings in a wide range of styles. The late gothic church of Sant Julià was restored by Josep Puig i Cadafalch. The same architect designed Casa Gari, a private residence adjoining the chapel of Sant Miquel del Cros, a work in the style of Antoni Gaudí by Lluís Bonet (1929). There are several buildings from the 16th to the 17th centuries, as well as the Roman chapel of La Mare de Déu del Viver and the benedictine priory of Sant Pere de Clarà. There is an interesting museum dedicated to water jugs, the Argentona Water Jug Museum, in which there are exhibited more than 700 pieces, including four ceramic works by Pablo Picasso.

== Culture ==
The town festival (Festa Major) occurs every 4 August, to celebrate Saint Dominic.

== Politics ==
The mayor of this town is Eudald Calvo Català.

== Archaeology ==
At the Can Blanc site in Argentona, archaeologists unearthed a small structure occupied from the mid-1st century to the early 3rd century AD. Comprising a series of small rooms, it likely formed part of a larger complex, with these rooms seemingly connected to a spacious central courtyard. While interpreted as the pars rustica of a villa, conclusive evidence for this hypothesis is absent.

== Demography ==
1900	1930	1950	1970	1986	2010
2014	2615	2889	4058	7183	11.718
