= Jordi Bonet i Armengol =

Spanish architect (1925–2022)

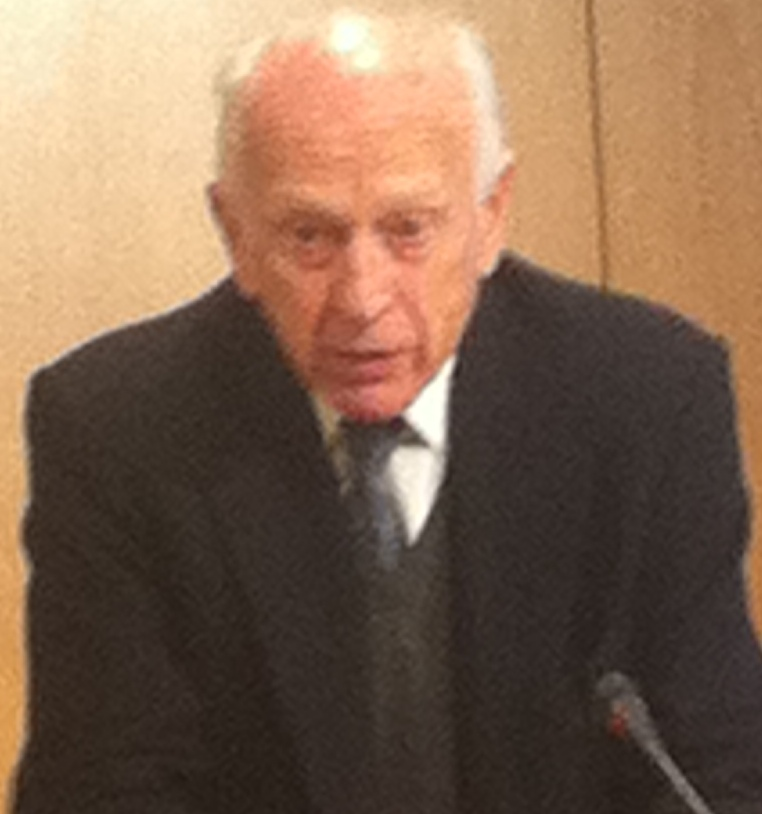
- Born: 12 May 1925; Barcelona, Spain
- Died: 20 June 2022 (aged 97); Barcelona, Spain
- Occupation: Architect
- Organization: Reial Acadèmia Catalana de Belles Arts de Sant Jordi
- Awards: Creu de Sant Jordi (1990); Barcelona Medal of Honor; City of Barcelona Award (1989); Cross of the Civil Order of Alfonso X the Wise (2006)

Jordi Bonet i Armengol (12 May 1925 – 20 June 2022) was a Catalan architect. He was the construction director and coordinator of the Sagrada Família from 1987 to 2012.
