= Premià de Dalt =

- Municipality
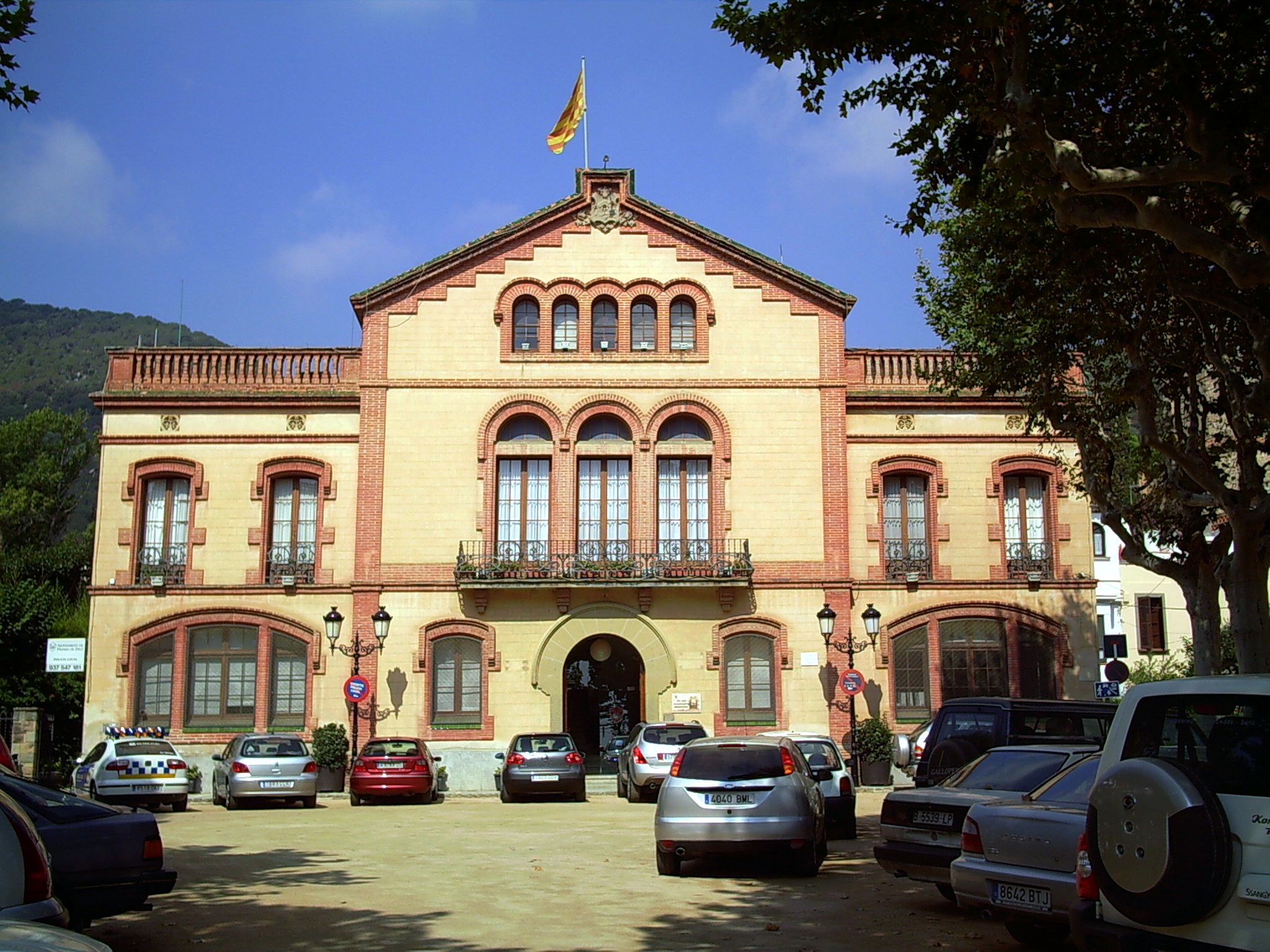
- Old town hall (1914)

- Location in Catalonia Premià de Dalt (Spain)
- Coordinates: 41°30′29″N 2°20′45″E
- Country: Spain
- Autonomous community: Catalonia
- Province: Barcelona
- Comarca: Maresme

Government
  - Mayor: Josep Triadó Bergés (2015)

Area
  - Total: 6.6 km^{2} (2.5 sq mi)
- Elevation: 142 m (466 ft)

Population (2025-01-01)
  - Total: 10,632
  - Density: 1,600/km^{2} (4,200/sq mi)
- Demonym: Premianenc/a
- Time zone: UTC+1 (CET)
  - Summer (DST): UTC+2 (CEST)
- Postal code: 08338
- Official language(s): Catalan
- Website: premiadedalt.cat

Premià de Dalt (Catalan pronunciation: [pɾəmiˈa ðə ˈdal]) is a municipality in the comarca of the Maresme in Catalonia, Spain. It has a population of 9,788.
