= Premià de Mar =

- Municipality
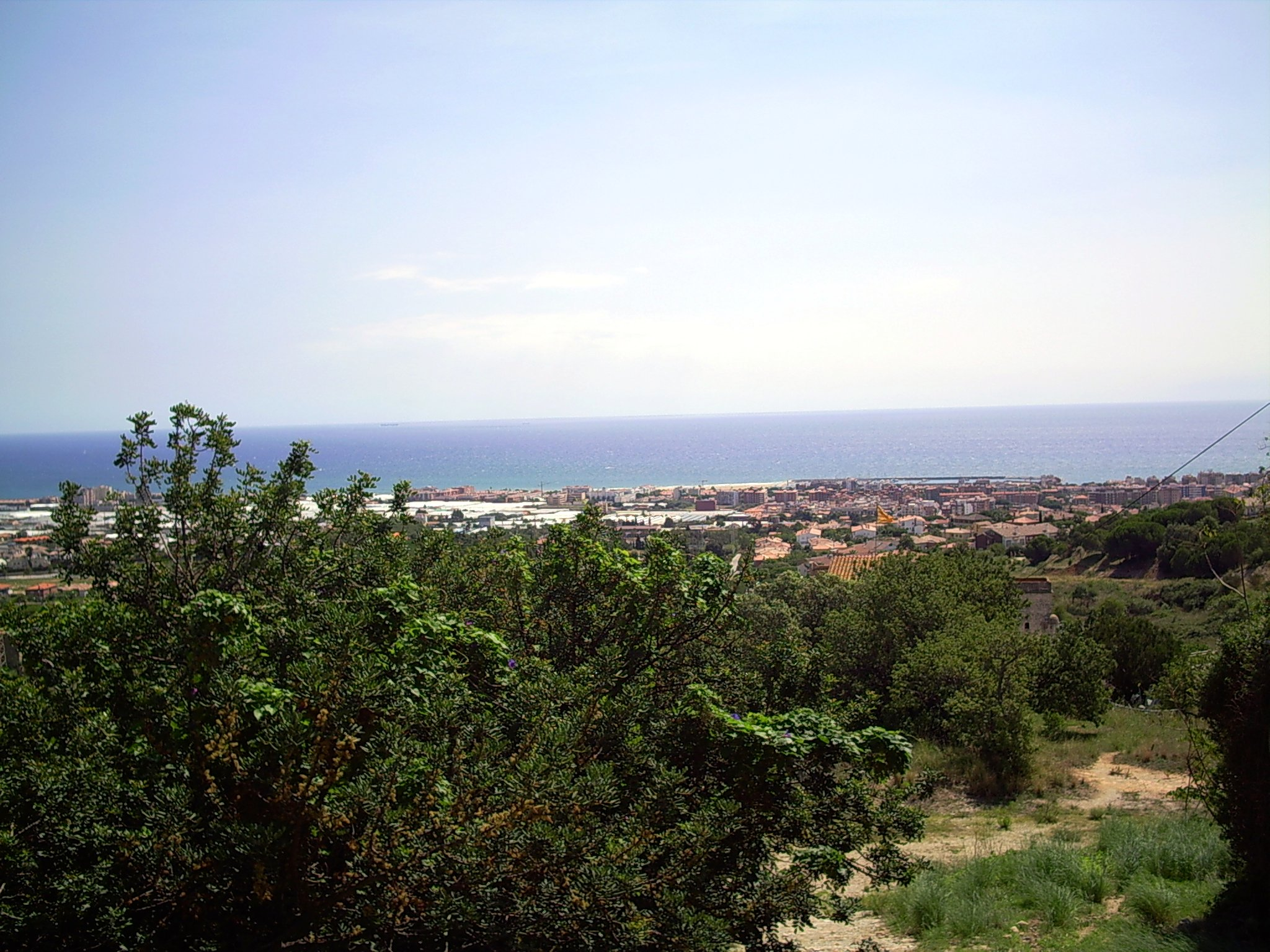

- Coat of arms

- Location in Catalonia Premià de Mar (Spain)
- Coordinates: 41°29′31″N 2°21′43″E
- Country: Spain
- Community: Catalonia
- Province: Barcelona
- Comarca: Maresme

Government
  - Mayor: Miquel Buch Moya (2015)

Area
  - Total: 2.1 km^{2} (0.81 sq mi)
- Elevation: 8 m (26 ft)

Population (2025-01-01)
  - Total: 29,431
  - Density: 14,000/km^{2} (36,000/sq mi)
- Demonym(s): Premianenc, premianenca
- Website: premiademar.cat

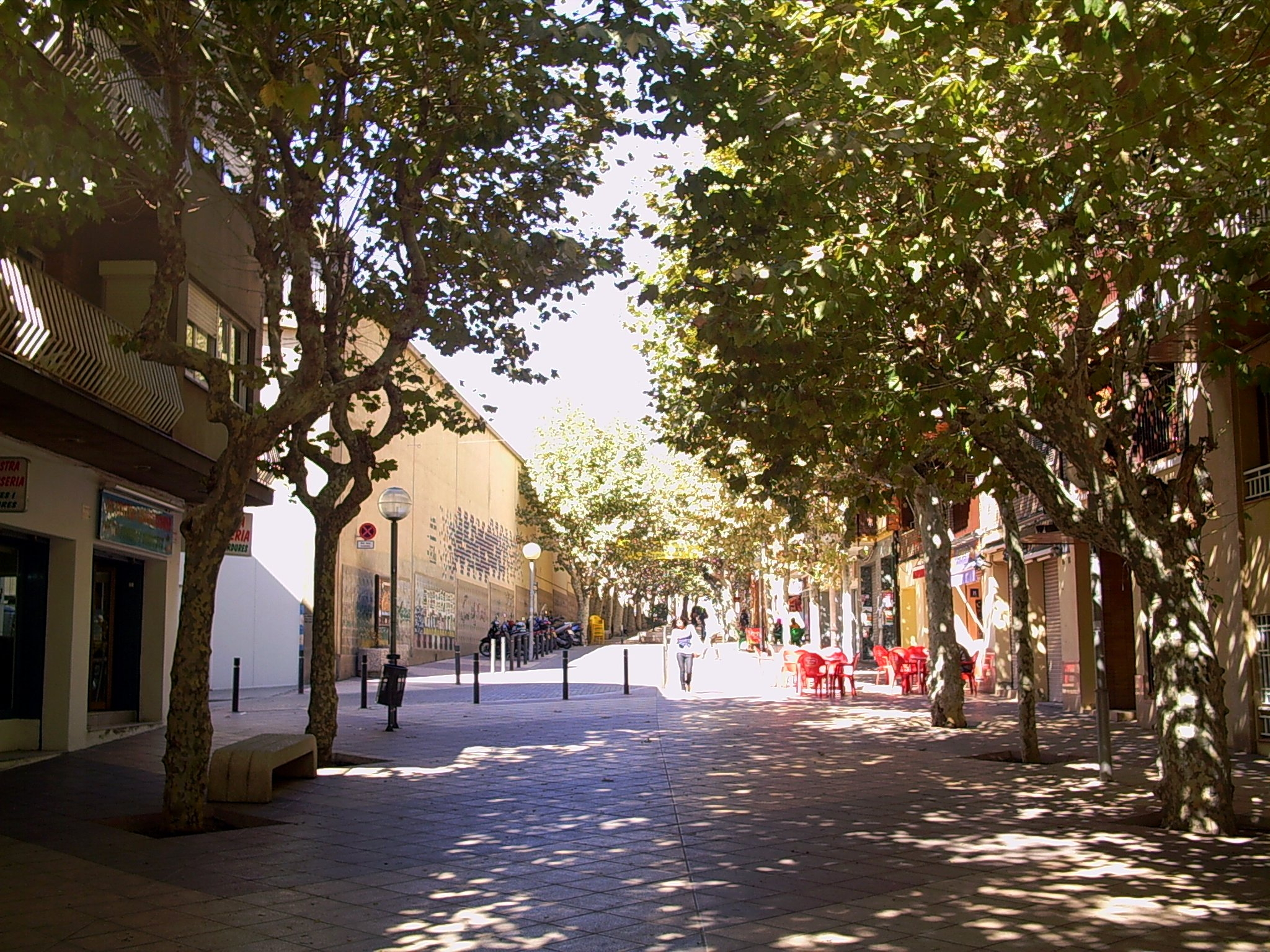
Riera de Premià

Premià de Mar (Catalan pronunciation: [pɾəmiˈa ðə ˈmaɾ]) is a municipality in the comarca of the Maresme in Catalonia. It is situated on the coast between El Masnou and Vilassar de Mar, to the north-east of Barcelona. The town is both a tourist centre and a dormitory town for Barcelona.

Like almost all municipalities of Maresme, Premià de Mar has been historically very well connected with the rest of the comarca and with Barcelona thanks to old Camí Ral (Royal Way) (actual N-II main road) and railroad (Barcelona-Mataró railroad route (1848) was the first to be constructed in all the Iberian Peninsula). Communications have been enhanced in recent years with the construction (1969) of the C-32's Barcelona-Mataró section, also the first autopista (highway) to be constructed in all the Iberian Peninsula.

The town centre has buildings in a wide range of styles: neoclassical, modernista, noucentista and simply eclectic. The church of Sant Cristòfol has a baroque doorway with maritime motifs.

== Demography ==
1900	1930	1950	1970	1986	2007
2,239	3,380	3,947	11,284	20,069	27,590

== Education ==
=== Primary schools ===
==== Public schools ====
- Escola Sant Cristòfol
- Escola El Dofí
- Escola La Lió
- Escola Mar Nova
- Escola Montserrat

==== Private schools ====
- Escola Assís
- Escola Verge del Pilar
- Escola La Salle

=== High schools ===
Institut Premia de Mar (public)
