= Sant Pol de Mar =

- Municipality
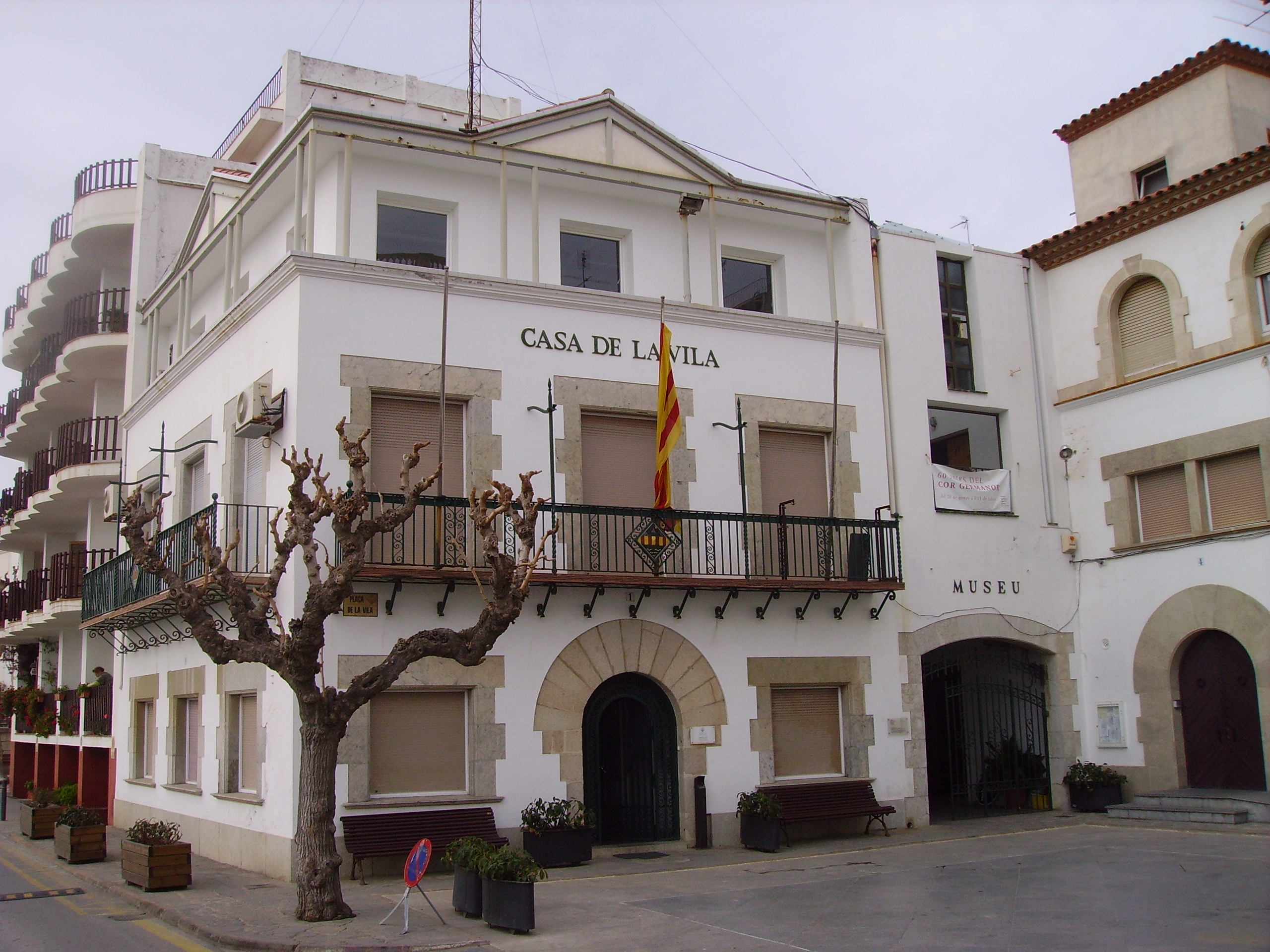

- Coat of arms

- Location in Catalonia Sant Pol de Mar (Spain)
- Coordinates: 41°36′12″N 2°37′28″E
- Country: Spain
- Community: Catalonia
- Province: Barcelona
- Comarca: Maresme

Government
  - Mayor: Montserrat Garrido Romera (2015)

Area
  - Total: 7.5 km^{2} (2.9 sq mi)
- Elevation: 15 m (49 ft)

Population (2025-01-01)
  - Total: 5,793
  - Density: 770/km^{2} (2,000/sq mi)
- Demonym: Santpolenc
- Postal Code: 08395
- Website: santpol.cat

Sant Pol de Mar (Catalan pronunciation: [ˈsam ˈpɔl də ˈmaɾ]) is a municipality in the comarca of Maresme in Catalonia, Spain. It is located on the coast between Canet de Mar and Calella. The national highway N-II and a station on the Renfe railway line link Sant Pol de Mar to the rest of the coast, while a local road links the town with Arenys de Munt.

== Twin towns ==
- Andorra La Vella, Andorra

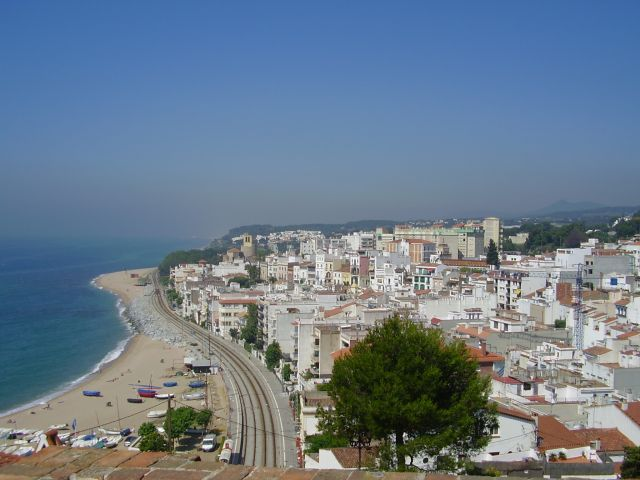
Sant Pol de Mar - view

== Sources ==
- Panareda Clopés, Josep Maria; Rios Calvet, Jaume; Rabella Vives, Josep Maria (1989). Guia de Catalunya, Barcelona: Caixa de Catalunya. ISBN 84-87135-01-3 (Spanish). ISBN 84-87135-02-1 (Catalan).
