= Vilassar de Mar =

- Municipality
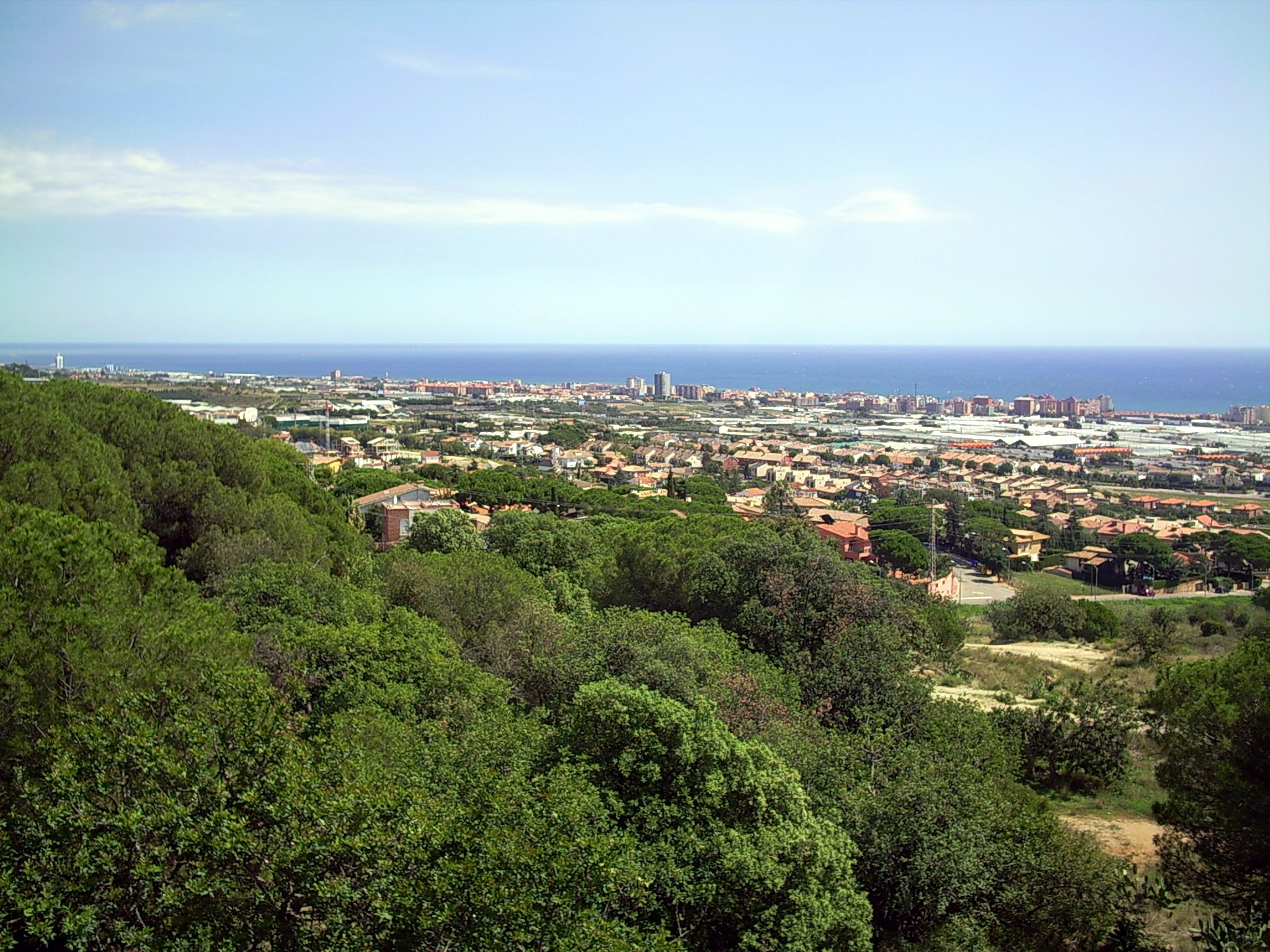
- View of Vilassar de Mar

- Coat of arms

- Location in Catalonia Vilassar de Mar (Spain)
- Coordinates: 41.506°N 2.391°E
- Country: Spain
- Community: Catalonia
- Province: Barcelona
- Comarca: Maresme

Government
  - Mayor: Damià Del Clot Trias (2015)

Area
  - Total: 4.0 km^{2} (1.5 sq mi)
- Elevation: 10 m (33 ft)

Population (2025-01-01)
  - Total: 21,227
  - Density: 5,300/km^{2} (14,000/sq mi)
- Demonym(s): Vilassarenc, vilassarenca
- Website: www.vilassardemar.cat

Vilassar de Mar (Catalan pronunciation: [biləˈsa ðə ˈmaɾ]) is a municipality in the comarca of the Maresme in Catalonia, Spain. It is situated on the coast between Premià de Mar and Cabrera de Mar, to the north-east of Barcelona. The town is both a tourist centre and a dormitory town for Barcelona, and is also known for its horticulture. The main N-II road and a Renfe railway line run through the town, while a local road connects the municipality with the C-32 autopista at Vilassar de Dalt and Mataró and Barcelona. The famous canned food company DANI is based in Vilassar de Mar coming from a Vilassar family.

== Demography ==
1900	1930	1950	1970	1986	2007
2953	7045	n/a	n/a	n/a	19,052

== Education ==
=== Primary schools ===
- Escola del Mar
- Escola els Alocs
- Escola Pérez Sala
- Escola Vaixell Burriac
- Franciscanes Vilassar de Mar (private school)

=== High schools ===
- Institut Pere Ribot
- Institut Vilatzara

== Notable people ==
- Àlex Casademunt, singer
- Bad Gyal, singer
- Mushkaa, singer
- Ona Batlle, footballer
- Wyke van Weelden, singer
- Rita Payés, jazz musician
- David Solans, actor
- Jan Virgili, footballer
- Xavi Espart, footballer
