= Ángeles Magret Vilá =

Spanish feminist (1896–1963)

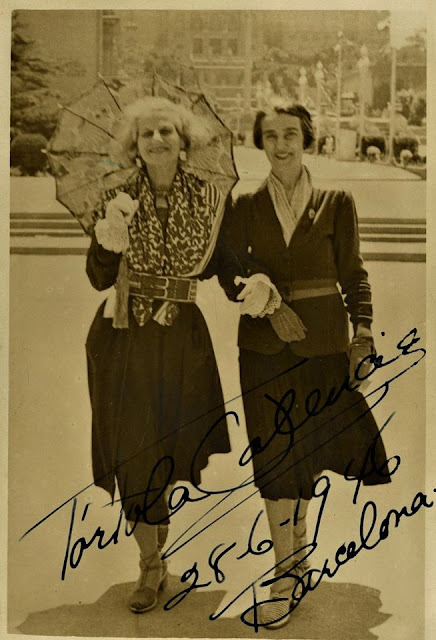
- Magret Vilá (right) with Carmen Tórtola Valencia in 1946
- Born: 1896
- Died: August 1, 1963 (aged 66–67); Barcelona, Spain
- Burial place: Poblenou cemetery
- Occupation: Art collector
- Partner: Carmen Tórtola Valencia (1928-1955)

Ángeles Magret Vilá (1896–1 August 1963) was a Spanish feminist. She is best known for her relationship with the dancer Carmen Tórtola Valencia.

== Biography ==
Ángeles Magret Vilá was born in 1896 in Sant Feliu de Guíxols. She is known for her relationship with the dancer Carmen Tórtola Valencia. They met for the first time in 1928 outside the Palacio de Bellas Artes in Mexico city, while Tórtola Valencia was on a tour and Magret Vilá was traveling with her parents. In 1930, Tórtola Valencia became seriously ill and promised Magret Vilá that if she recovered, she would give up dancing. As per her promise, she gave her last dance performance in Quito later that same year. After Tórtola Valencia gave up her dancing career, both of them stayed away from public life and devoted themselves to art. Tórtola Valencia gave Magret Vilá an autograph album that she completed over the years.

During the Spanish Civil War, Tórtola Valencia and Magret Vilá took refuge in Magret Vilá's family home in Sant Feliu de Guíxols. After the war ended in 1939, they returned to their home in Major de Sarrià where they had lived earlier since 1932. Magret Vilá managed the household while also serving as the secretary of Tórtola Valencia. She helped reconstruct Tórtola's public image and, as a practising Catholic, influenced Tórtola's conversion, which was necessary during the Francoist regime. In 1932, they had already drawn up wills in which each named the other as heir to their possessions in the event of death.

Fourteen years younger than Tórtola Valencia, Magret Vilá was adopted by her to silence rumors about their relationship in 1942, at a time when their way of life was subject to scrutiny under the Francoist regime. Following the adoption, Magret Vilá added "Tórtola" to her surname. She remained by Tórtola Valecia's side until her death on 13 March 1955. Thereafter, she dedicated herself to preserving Tórtola Valencia's memory.

In 1962, Magret Vilá donated Tórtola Valencia's belongings—including her wardrobe, press-clipping albums, paintings, and personal documents—to the Centre de Documentació i Museu de les Arts Escèniques (Documentation Centre and Museum of the Performing Arts of the Theatre Institute) in Barcelona. The lace collection was sold to the Colegio del Arte Mayor de la Seda in Barcelona, which organised a major exhibition in 1960. In 1992, the collection was deposited in the Marès de la Punta Museum, which forms part of the Arenys de Mar Museum.

Magret Vilá died on 1 August 1963, and was buried next to Tórtola Valencia in the Poblenou cemetery in Barcelona.
