= Kiss of Death =

Kiss of Death may refer to:

- Kiss of Judas, Judas's betrayal of Jesus with a kiss identifying him to his executioners
- Kiss of death (mafia), a Mafia signal that someone has been marked for execution

== Film and television ==
- Kiss of Death (1916 film), a Swedish silent film directed by Victor Sjöström
- Kiss of Death (1947 film), a film directed by Henry Hathaway
- The Kiss of Death (1973 film), a film featuring Chen Ping
- Kiss of Death (1977 film), a made-for-TV film directed by Mike Leigh
- Kiss of Death (1995 film), a remake of the 1947 film, directed by Barbet Schroeder
- Kiss of Death (2008 film), a 2008 UK crime drama television film
- Kiss of Death (audio drama), a 2011 audio play based on the TV series Doctor Who
- "Kiss of Death" (Get Smart), an episode of Get Smart
- "Kiss of Death" (That '70s Show), an episode of That '70s Show

== Literature ==
- The Kiss of Death (novel), a 2008 novel by Marcus Sedgwick
- Kiss of Death, a young-adult novel by Malcolm Rose
- Kiss of Death, the eighth novel in The Morganville Vampires series by Rachel Caine

== Music ==
=== Albums ===
- Kiss of Death (Jadakiss album), 2004
- Kiss of Death (Motörhead album), 2006
- Kiss of Death, by IC3PEAK, 2022
- Kiss of Death, by Untoten, 1997

=== Songs ===
- "Kiss of Death" (song), by Mika Nakashima, the opening theme from the anime series Darling in the Franxx
- "Kiss of Death", by Anvil from Strength of Steel
- "Kiss of Death", by Alec Empire from Futurist
- "Kiss of Death", by Black Sabbath from Forbidden
- "Kiss of Death", by Dokken from Back for the Attack
- "Kiss of Death", by Glamour of the Kill from Glamour of the Kill
- "Kiss of Death", by Jassie Gift from the Rain Rain Come Again soundtrack
- "Kiss of Death", by New Order, the B-side of the single "The Perfect Kiss"
- "Kiss of Death", by Split Lip Rayfield from Never Make It Home

== Other uses ==
- Kiss of death (firearm), a handgun hidden in lipstick, used by the KGB
- The Kiss of Death (sculpture), a 1930 marble sculpture in Poblenou Cemetery, Barcelona
- The Kiss of Death (photograph), a photograph of Linda Christian and Alfonso de Portago taken shortly before the latter's death
- "Kiss of Death", a game-winning shot made by Mario Elie during the 1995 NBA Playoffs
- Kiss-o'-Death, a network packet used to counteract NTP server misuse and abuse
- "Kiss of Death", a type of Fatality in the Mortal Kombat franchise

== See also ==
- Kiss of the Death, a 2008 Vietnamese film
- "Sweet Kiss of Death", the name given to the horse ridden by Frank Hayes following his death
