= Carmen Tórtola Valencia =

Spanish dancer

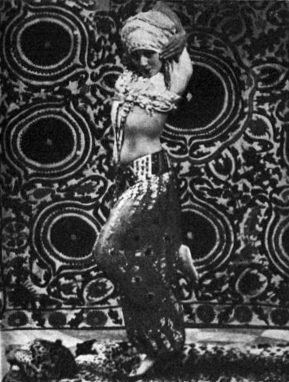
- Tórtola Valencia, performing an Indian dance in New York City in 1915
- Born: 18 June 1882; Seville, Spain
- Died: February 13, 1955 (aged 72); Barcelona, Spain
- Burial place: Poblenou cemetery
- Occupations: Dancer; Painter
- Partner: Ángeles Magret Vilá (1928–1955)

Carmen Tórtola Valencia (18 June 1882 – 13 February 1955) was a Spanish early modern dancer, choreographer, costume designer, and painter. She began her dancing career in the early 1910s. She gave up dancing in 1928, dedicated her later life to feminism and art. She lived with her partner Ángeles Magret Vilá until her death in 1955. She generally performed barefoot, and is said to have been the inspiration for Rubén Darío's poem, La bailarina de los pies desnudos ("The Barefoot Dancer").

== Early life ==
Carmen Tórtola Valencia was born on 18 June 1882 in Seville to a Catalan father Florenç Tórtola Ferrer (d. 1891) and Andalusian mother Georgina Valencia Valenzuela (d. 1894). Her family emigrated to London when she was three years old.

== Dance career ==
Tórtola Valencia made her debut as a dancer at the Gaiety Theatre, London in 1908. She dance at Berlin Wintergarten theatre and Folies Bergère in Paris later in the same year, and performed in Nuremberg and London in 1909. She made her debut in Spain at the Teatro Romea in Madrid in 1911. She later performed at Ateneo de Madrid in 1913. One of the people she trained was the Anglo-Indian dancer Olive Craddock ("Roshanara").

== Later life ==
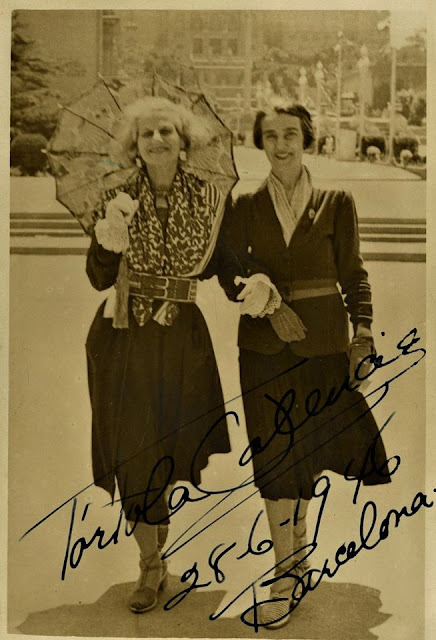
Tórtola Valencia (left) and her partner Ángeles Magret Vilá in Barcelona in 1946

Tórtola Valencia met Ángeles Magret Vilá for the first time in 1928 outside the Palacio de Bellas Artes in Mexico city, while Tórtola Valencia was on a tour and Magret Vilá was traveling with her parents. In 1930, Tórtola Valencia became seriously ill and promised Magret Vilá that if she recovered, she would give up dancing. As per her promise, she gave her last dance performance in Quito later that same year. After Tórtola Valencia gave up her dancing career, both of them stayed away from public life and devoted themselves to art. Tórtola Valencia gave Magret Vilá an autograph album that she completed over the years.

Tórtola Valencia was a pioneering feminist in the early 20th century. Being a homosexual and having leftist ideas, Tórtola Valencia was jailed during the Spanish Civil War. During the War, Tórtola Valencia and Magret Vilá took refuge in Magret Vilá's family home in Sant Feliu de Guíxols. After the war ended in 1939, they returned to their home in Major de Sarrià where they had lived earlier since 1932.

Tórtola Valencia was also a member of Generación del 13, a painter collective. Magret Vilá managed the household while also serving as the secretary of Tórtola Valencia. Magret Vilá helped reconstruct Tórtola's public image after the Spanish Civil War and, as a practising Catholic, influenced Tórtola's conversion, which was necessary during the Francoist regime. In 1932, both had already drawn up wills in which each named the other as heir to their possessions in the event of death.

Magret Vilá was fourteen years younger than Tórtola Valencia, and was adopted by Tórtola Valencia to silence rumors about their relationship in 1942, at a time when their way of life was subject to scrutiny under the Francoist regime. Following the adoption, Magret Vilá added "Tórtola" to her surname.

Magret Vilá and Tórtola Valecia's remained together until Tórtola Valecia's death on 13 March 1955. She was later buried at Poblenou Cemetery in Barcelona.

== Style and legacy ==
In his book Tórtola Valencia and Her Times (1982), Odelot Sobrac, one of her early biographers, said Tórtola Valencia was inspired by Isadora Duncan and developed a style that expressed emotion through movement. Her Spanish modernismo style enabled a career as a solo concert dance artist who performed classic, Oriental, and Spanish dances. She generally performed barefoot, and is said to have been the inspiration for Rubén Darío's poem, La bailarina de los pies desnudos ("The Barefoot Dancer").

In 1962, Magret Vilá donated Tórtola Valencia's belongings—including her wardrobe, press-clipping albums, paintings, and personal documents—to the Centre de Documentació i Museu de les Arts Escèniques (Documentation Centre and Museum of the Performing Arts of the Theatre Institute) in Barcelona. The lace collection was sold to the Colegio del Arte Mayor de la Seda in Barcelona, which organised a major exhibition in 1960. In 1992, the collection was deposited in the Marès de la Punta Museum, which forms part of the Arenys de Mar Museum.
