= Colitas =

Colitas (little tails) may refer to:

- A slang term in Hispanic culture for the buttocks
- A slang term in Mexico for the buds of the cannabis plant
- Character from Familia Telerín.

== See also ==
- Colita (Isabel Steva i Hernández), Spanish photographer
