= Plaça de Jean Genet, Barcelona =

Square in Barcelona, Spain

Coordinates: 41.37672°N 2.17377°E

Plaça de Jean Genet is a small, triangle-shaped square in Barcelona (the capital of Catalonia in Spain). It's located in the southern side of El Raval, by the port and Avinguda de les Drassanes and the Catalan Gothic buildings of the Royal Shipyard, in the district of Ciutat Vella. Its main feature is the functionalist high-rise which hosts the local Official School of Languages. It is named after French author Jean Genet who resided in the city for a time and whose novel The Thief's Journal takes place in the poverty-stricken alleys of Raval. Essayist Lluís Permanyer proposed the name in 1997.

== Transport ==
Barcelona Metro station Drassanes is not far away. It's served by line L3.
