= La Mà trencada =

La Mà trencada is a Catalan magazine directed and edited by Joan Merlí. It was published for the first time on 6 November 1924, and it continued publishing every fortnight until 31 January 1925. However, in the book from Torrent and Tassis there is a mistake and it is written that the last number was published on 15 January 1926. Related with the format of the magazine, it had a measurement of 270x210 mm. Moreover, it was printed in the printing house “Omega”, which was situated in the Street Ample 53 in Barcelona, Spain. Each number consisted in 20 pages in two columns and it cost a peseta. The presentation of the magazine was very elegant with numerous images dedicated to modern Catalan artists.

== Theme and Collaborators ==
The theme of the magazine was the poetry and the literature of the Catalan writers of that time with modern orientations. For this reason, the magazine consisted in some biographies about the authors and its work which was literary and plastic art.

“La Mà trencada” can be included inside a group of different magazines and art publications which were directed by Joan Merlí. Among these publications we find the magazine “Quatre Coses”, “Les Arts Catalanes” and the wonderful magazine “Art”.

In the magazine they were published literary work from different authors like Joan Creixells, J.M. Picó, Carles Soldevila, Agustí Esclasans, Carles Riba, Josep Maria de Sagarra and Joan Salvat-Papasseït. This last writer had just died before the magazine was published for the first time. Furthermore, there were pictures of the sculptures of Enric Casanovas. In addition, the cover of the last number of the magazine contained a drawing of Pablo Ruiz Picasso and there were more pictures of this painter inside the magazine.
