= María Araujo =

Spanish costume designer (1950–2020)

María Araujo (1950 in La Aldea de San Nicolás – 25 March 2020, in Barcelona) was a Spanish costume designer who worked in theater, cinema and television.

== Career ==
Araujo worked with directors such as Mario Gas, Josep Maria Flotats, Carles Alfaro and José María Pou. At the Teatro de la Zarzuela she worked in the production of María Moliner and La Villana.

In cinema, she worked, among others, in the films Serenata a la luz de la luna, Mater amatísima, La cripta, La revuelta de los pájaros, Tic Tac, El pianista, Valentín, Iris and the TV3 miniseries Arnau. Most of her costumes, a total of 1,133, are kept in the Centre de Documentació i Museu de les Arts Escèniques.

== Awards ==
She received a Max Award for Amadeus (1999) and another for El lindo don Diego (2014). In 2018 she received her third Max award for Richard III. She was awarded four times by the critics of Barcelona, in 1984 for Cal dir-ho?, in 1999 for Amadeus and Dones sàvies and in 2016 for Amor & Shakespeare. In 2008, 2010 and 2014 she also won the Premio ADE de Figurismo for Tio Vania, El arte de la comedia and El lindo don Diego, respectively, and in 2009 she won the Gran Vía Prize for Musical Theater for her designs for Sweeney Todd.

In 2017 she was awarded the "Can de Plata" by her native town, La Aldea de San Nicolás.

== Death ==
Araujo died in March 2020, aged 69, from COVID-19, during the COVID-19 pandemic in Spain.
