= Xavier Miserachs =

Spanish photographer

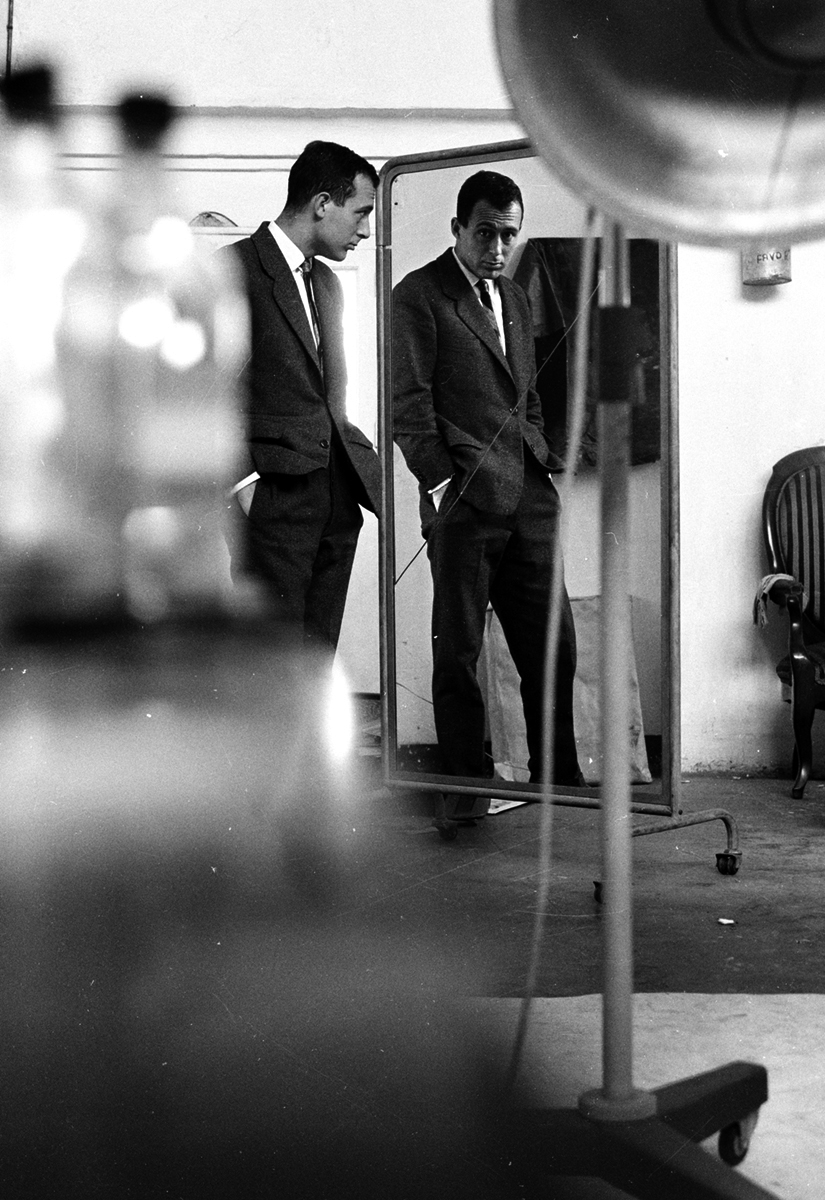
Xavier Miserachs. Selfportrait

Xavier Miserachs i Ribalta (Catalan pronunciation: [ʃəβiˈe mizəˈɾaɡz i riˈβaltə]; July 12, 1937 – August 14, 1998) was a Spanish photographer. He studied medicine at the University of Barcelona, but left school to be a photographer. He exhibited his work in Barcelona from 1956. His work is reminiscent of neorealism and is representative of the years of Spanish economic recovery, 1950–1960. His photographs show him as a creator of a new image of the city and its people. In 1998 he received the Creu de Sant Jordi of the Catalan government.

On February 21, 2011, the news was made public that Miserachs' daughters deposited their father's archive of more than 80,000 images at the Barcelona Museum of Contemporary Art.

== Biography ==
Miserachs was born in Barcelona on July 12, 1937, in the middle of the Spanish Civil War. He was the son of a hematologist and a librarian, Manuel Miserachs and Montserrat Ribalta. He discovered photography at the Technical Institute of Santa Eulàlia, in Barcelona, where he met Ramon Fabregat and his brother Antonio. He studied four courses of a career in medicine, but left shortly before the end to embark on a career as a professional photographer.

In 1952, he became a member of the Photographic Association of Catalonia (Agrupació Fotogràfica de Catalunya), where he became friends with Oriol Maspons. He first exhibited at the headquarters of the Photographic Association of Catalonia in 1957, along with Ricard Terré and Ramon Masats. In 1959 they presented work together again in the Sala Aixelà of Barcelona. He began his professional career in 1959, when Xavier Busquets commissioned him to guide Picasso in his drawings of the facade of the College of Architects of Catalonia.

In 1961, after returning from military service, Miserachs wanted independence, and set up his first studio in Casa David at Carrer Tuset in Barcelona. He began photographing on request and for book authors with his work appearing in books such as Barcelona Blanc i Negre (with 400 photographs recounting the war in Barcelona) and Costa Brava Show.

During the 1960s he also served as a news reporter for Spanish magazines. In 1968 he signed an exclusive contract with the Revista Triunfo. He also published several articles in La Vanguardia, Gaceta Ilustrada, Interviú, Bazaar and Magazin. He was thus able to witness such historic events as May 68, Swinging London and Prague Spring. Miserachs engaged mainly in editorial photography but also did work doing reports.

In January 1967 he co-founded the Escola Eina, where he was one of the first professors of photography. He occasionally frequented Boccaccio's, then the meeting place par excellence of the gauche divine. In 1997 he published his memoir, contact sheets, which won a Gaziel prize.

Miserachs died on August 14, 1998, aged 61, in the Hospital Germans Trias i Pujol in Badalona from lung cancer.

== Works ==
=== Features ===
Miserachs was the youngest member of a group of photographers led by Francesc Català-Roca. The group's other members were: Oriol Maspons, Ricard Terré, Paco Ontañón, Leopold Pomés, and Ramon Masats.

At the time, the only photography magazine was Arte Fotografico, founded by the Ignacio Barceló in 1952, which featured mostly amateur photography. It was announced that Josep M. Casademont would assume the role of promoter between the theoretical and Catalan photographers. In 1963 he published his own magazine, Image and Sound, taking the same direction of Sala Aixelà of Barcelona. Here, Casademont describes the group's work as neorealist:

For us, photography was a food problem, was not an existential or spiritual problem. Was the problem of practicing the profession to live we had chosen. I know the rear plastic manifestation could imply that denounced a state of injustice, misery ... But no, nothing, lie. What I was really aspired to become a professional photographer. It seemed a very honorable aspiration and revolted us that society does not give us access mechanisms. They then had a particular realization of all this, instead of escaping, for example by means of surrealism escapèssim us by way of social criticism, I think it is purely accidental.

— Josep M. Casademont

His publication in Barcelona, Blanc y Negre, in 1964, was a significant event in Miserachs's career. The book also looked upon the sour and chaotic urban world as they complete the visions of Barcelona (Wolfgang Weber, 1929 and Català-Roca, 1954), and went beyond charming and picturesque character, conveying a new sensitivity.

=== Films ===
Miserachs had a brief foray with film, making underground movie shots with some of his friends Enrique Vila-Matas, Emma Cohen and Jordi Cadena. Later he directed and produced his own short film, Amén historieta muda (Amen dumb cartoon.) He made the film still from Juguetes rotos, directed by Manuel Summers, in 1966.

== Legacy ==
=== Memorials ===
In 2001 the first Xavier Miserachs Photography Award was held in Barcelona, a black and white photography contest named after the author for his work in Barcelona Blanc i Negre.

In 1998 the town of Palafrugell named a route between the beaches of Calella de Palafrugell and Llafranc after Miserachs. The Biennial of Photography Xavier Miserachs, dedicated to documentary photography, is also held in Palafrugell. In the biennials of 1999, 2004, 2008 and 2010 exhibitions were held of Miserachs' work.

The exhibition hall on the ground floor of the Palace of the Viceroy's wife in Barcelona was, between December 17, 1998, and 2010, named in honour of Miserachs. In 2010, Xavier Sala Miserachs moved to the old Hall of Numismatics, and the ground floor was renamed Virreina Lab.

=== Archive ===
Miserachs' archive includes approximately 60,000 negatives, 20,000 slides, 2,500 contact sheets, notebooks with personal notes, administrative documentation, and part of his personal library. Since 2011 it has been housed in the Research and Documentation Center Museum of Contemporary Art in Barcelona.

== Books ==
He published several photo books, most with text in Catalan or Spanish.

Year	Original Naming	Text by	Description	Publisher	Ref.
1964	Barcelona, blanc i negre	Josep Maria Espinàs		Aymà	
1966	Costa Brava show	Manuel Vázquez i Peter Coughtry		Kairós	
1966	Conversaciones en Cataluña	Salvador Pàniker	Interviews with Josep Pla, Ana María Matute, Josep Maria Gironella, Salvador Espriu, Josep Maria de Porcioles, Antoni Tàpies, Josep Maria Subirachs or Salvador Dalí among others.	Kairós	
1967	Los cachorros	Mario Vargas Llosa		Lumen	
1967	El arte prerrománico asturiano	Antonio Bonet Correa		Polígrafa	
1969	Conversaciones en Madrid	Salvador Pàniker	Interviews with Camilo José Cela, Antonio Buero Vallejo, Aranguren, Sáenz de Oiza among others.	Kairós	
1978	Andalucía Barroca	Antonio Bonet Correa		Polígrafa	
1982	Catalunya des del mar	Carles Barral	Collection Vida i costums dels catalans.	Edicions 62	
1984	Aprendre a conviure	Josep Maria Espinàs	Aprende a conviure. Reflexions sobre civilitat.	Caixa de Sabadell	
1985	Catalunya a vol d'ocell	Carles Barral, Josep Maria Ainaud		Edicions 62	
1987	Barcelona a vol d'ocell	Montserrat Roig i Fransitorra		Edicions 62	
1987	Passeig de Mar	Xavier Febrés	Passeig de mar: la costa catalana del delta de l'Ebre a Cotlliure.	Ed. Plaza y Janés/Diari de Barcelona	
1988	Els barcelonins	Colita, Oriol Maspons, Ana María Moix, Terenci Moix		Edicions 62	
1988	Les Barcelones del Món	J. Nuñez, Rafael Pradas		Caixa de Barcelona	
1990	Metros i Metròpolis	Xavier Febrés, Mercè Sala		Diputació de Barcelona	
1990	Gran Teatre del Liceu		With Ferran Freixa.	L'Avenç	
1992	El Gran Teatre del Liceu a Sevilla	Ramon Pla i Arxé		L'Avenç	
1997	L'Empordà, llibre de meravelles	Antoni Puigverd		Edicions 62	
1995	Ciutat Vella. Visions des d'una passió	Joan Barril, Josep Maria Carandell, Josep Cuní, Arcadi Espada, Josep Maria Espinàs, Xavier Febrés, Patrícia Gabancho, Josep Maria Huertas, Josep M. Lladó, Lluís Permanyer, Alfred Rexach i Margarita Rivière.		Lunwerg	
1997	Fulls de contacte	Xavier Miserachs	Premi Gaziel 1997	Edicions 62	
1998	Girona a Quatre Vents	Joan Domènech i Moner		Lunwerg	
1998	Criterio fotográfico	Xavier Miserachs		Editorial Omega	
2004	Conversaciones en Madrid y en Cataluña	Salvador Pàniker i Alemany	reedition	Kairós	
2006	Memòries de la Costa Brava	Rosa Regàs	Fotografies de F.Català Roca i Miserachs	Lupita Books	

== Main exhibits ==
- 1957 – Photographic Association of Catalonia, Barcelona; Photographic Association of Almeria (AFAL); and Royal Photographic Society of Madrid. I Terré-Miserachs-Masats.
- 1959 – Sala Aixelà, Barcelona. Terré-Miserachs-Masats, directed by Josep Maria Casademont.
- 1982 – Galeria René Metras, Barcelona. Fotografia catalana als anys 50–60. With Leopold Pomés and Francesc Català-Roca.
- 1987 – Barcelona Metrópolis. Installation at the Gran Via of Barcelona from a collective exhibition with Colita, Oriol Maspons and Francesc Català-Roca.
- 1991 – Grupo AFAL 1956–1991.
- 1992 – Centre d'Art Santa Mònica. Temps de Silenci.
- 1992 – Fundació "la Caixa". 1 segon i 25-centèsimes. Directed by Alain Dupuy.
- 2000 – Association of Journalist of Catalonia (Col·legi de Periodistes de Catalunya), Barcelona. Xavier Miserachs, un luxe periodístic.
- 2004 – Photoespaña 04, Barcelona. With Terré and Masats.
- 2006 – Josef Sudek Gallery, Praga. Barcelona. Blanco y Negro.
- 2007 – Centre Fontana d'Or, Girona. Francesc Català-Roca i Xavier Miserachs. Dues mirades al territori de la Costa Brava.
- 2008 – Galería Hartmann, Barcelona. En clau de dona.

== Awards ==
- 1954 – I Trofeo Luis Navarro
- 1997 – II Hojas de contactos. memorias, II Premi Gaziel
- 1998 – Life, Creu de Sant Jordi
