= Joan de Sagarra =

Catalan journalist and writer (1939–2025)

Joan de Sagarra i Devesa
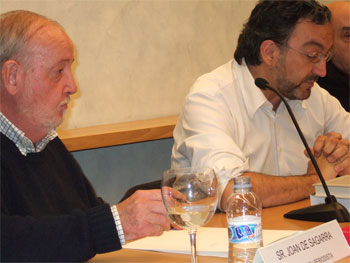
- Sagarra (left) and Xavier Pla
- Born: 8 January 1939 Paris, France
- Died: 9 May 2025 (aged 86) Spain
- Occupation: Journalist, writer

Joan de Sagarra i Devesa (8 January 1939 – 9 May 2025) was a Spanish journalist and writer, son of the poet Josep Maria de Sagarra.

== Life and career ==
Sagarra studied at the Institut d'études théâtrales of the Sorbonne, and when back in Barcelona he worked as a journalist for Tele/eXpres, El País and El Temps, among other publications. He still wrote columns for La Vanguardia newspaper.

He is thought to be the father of the concept of the gauche divine ('divine left'), a movement of leftist intellectuals and artists that spread through Barcelona in the 1960s and early 1970s. The majority of its members came from the well-to-do classes of the Catalan capital.

Sagarra died on 9 May 2025, at the age of 86.

== Bibliography ==
- Las rumbas de Joan de Sagarra (Kairós, 1971)
- La horma de mi sombrero (Alfaguara, 1997)
