= Gauche divine =

Gauche divine (transl. 'divine left') was the name given to an intellectual and artistic scene in 1960s and 1970s Barcelona, dubbed as elitist and associated to a bourgeois environment. It coalesced towards 1967, with the opening of the Bocaccio discothèque. The term of gauche divine, ironic but not always pejorative, was coined by writer Joan de Sagarra in 1969. The group members generally accepted enthusiastically the name proposed by Segarra, insofar it confirmed their self-perception about it. Individuals associated to the scene include Oriol Bohigas, Federico Correa, Ricardo Bofill, Oriol Regàs, Román Gubern, Terenci Moix, Ana María Moix, Esther Tusquets, Beatriz de Moura, Rosa Regàs, Jaime Gil de Biedma, Carlos Barral, Serena Vergano, Teresa Gimpera, Oriol Maspons, Colita, Leopoldo Pomés, Xavier Miserachs, Romy, and Eve Field Marx. According to Rosa Regàs, it also included some of the authors of the Latin American boom who were living in Barcelona at the time, such as García Márquez, Mario Vargas Llosa, Alfredo Bryce Echenique, and José Donoso.

They generally embraced a shallow interest in politics, displaying an affective sort of Anti-Francoism rather than any militant commitment. In the view of Mercedes Mazquiarán, many dismissed the gauche divine as "a frivolous anecdote of the 'developmentalist' years of the Francoist dictatorship". Their alineation with cosmopolitan preferences set them apart early from the Catalan nationalism movement. The gauche divine participated nonetheless along with the rest of the Catalan intelligentsia in the performative enclosure of intellectuals in Montserrat in 1970 against the Burgos trials, which drew international attention

== See also ==
- Gauche caviar
