= International Spy Museum =

Museum in Washington, D.C., US

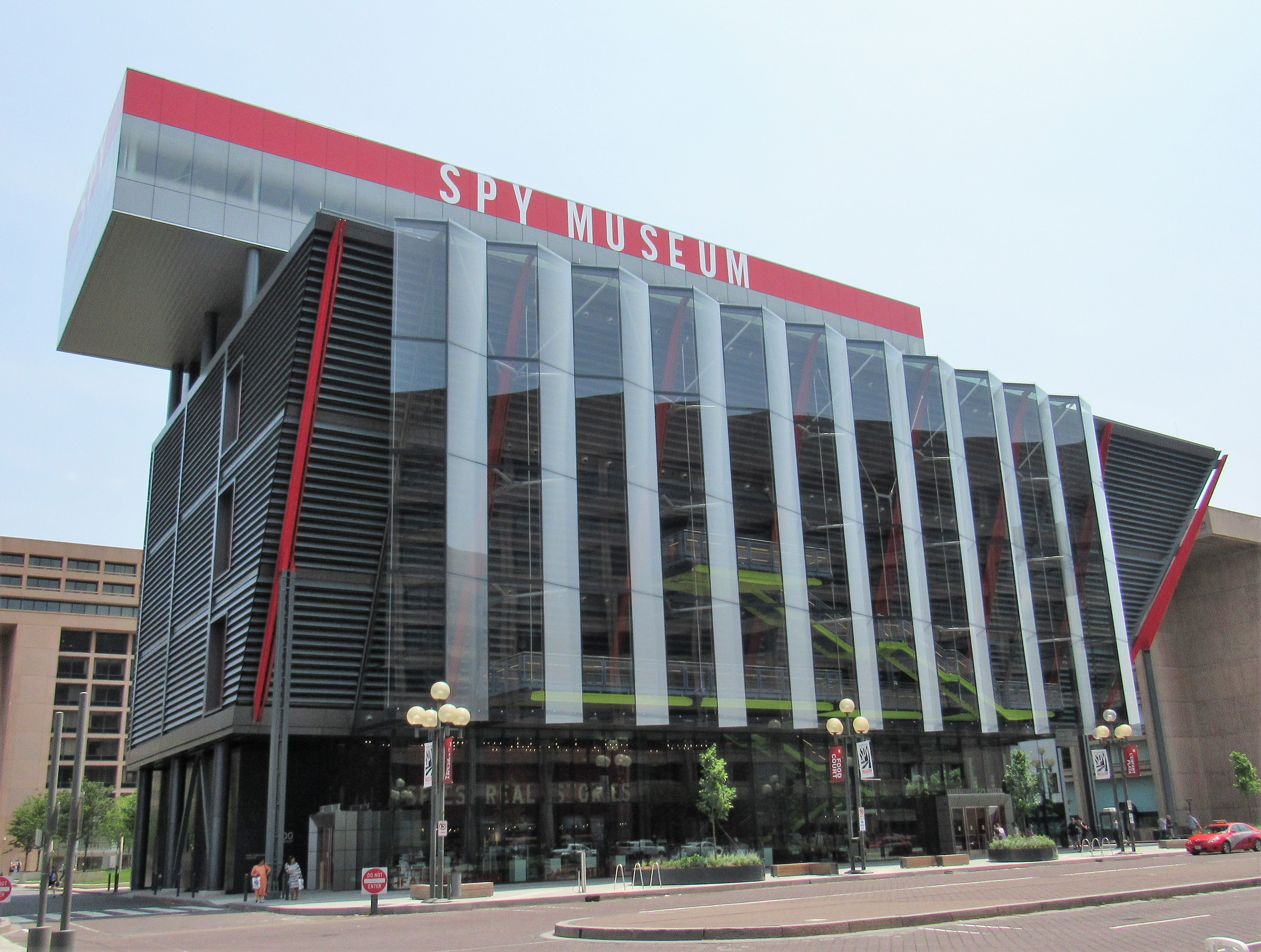

- Location within Washington, D.C. International Spy Museum (the United States)
- Established: July 19, 2002
- Location: 700 L'Enfant Plaza, SW; Washington, D.C. United States
- Coordinates: 38.884°N 77.026°W
- Type: History
- Visitors: Approx. 600,000 annually
- Executive director: Christopher P. Costa
- President: Tamara Christian
- Public transit access: L'Enfant Plaza
- Website: www.spymuseum.org

The International Spy Museum is an independent non-profit history museum which documents the tradecraft, history, and contemporary role of the intelligence field and espionage. It holds the largest collection of international espionage artifacts on public display. The museum opened in 2002 in the Penn Quarter neighborhood of Washington, D.C., and relocated to L'Enfant Plaza in 2019.

== History ==
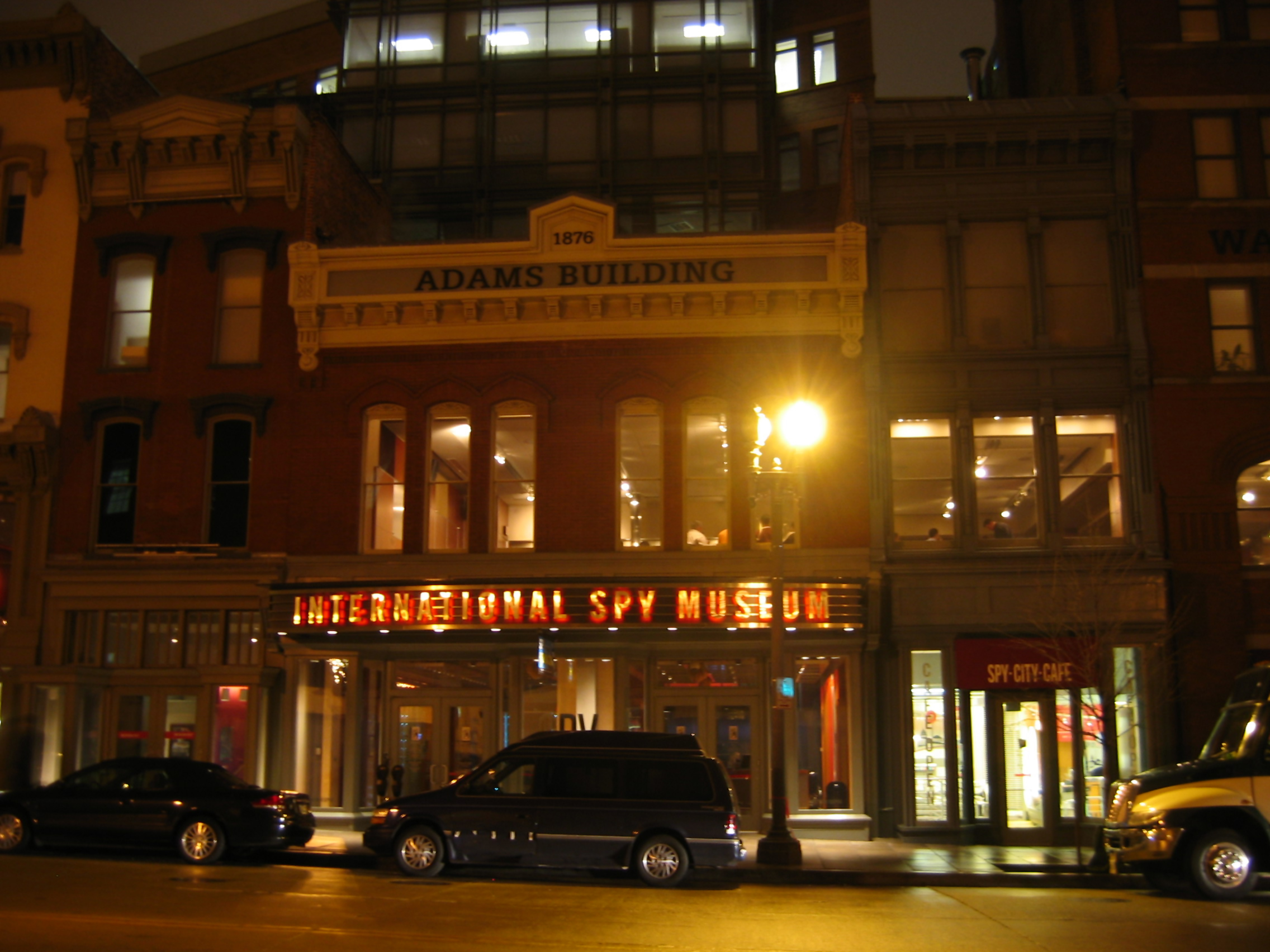
Original location of the International Spy Museum at Penn Quarter (2002–2019)

Milton Maltz, a code-breaker during the Korean War and founder of the Malrite Communications Group in 1956 (later The Malrite Company), conceptualized the International Spy Museum in 1996 as a for-profit organization. The original museum facility in the Penn Quarter neighborhood was built by Milton Maltz and The House on F Street, L.L.C. at a cost of approximately US$40 million. It opened to the public in 2002.

The foundation cost of the original museum was half funded by the Malrite Company; the other $20 million came from the District of Columbia through enterprise zone bonds and TIF bonds. The museum was part of the ongoing rejuvenation of Penn Quarter, kicked off in the 1980s by the Pennsylvania Avenue Development Corporation.

In April 2015, plans were released for a new museum designed by Rogers Stirk Harbour + Partners. In January 2019, the museum began the process of moving from its previous F Street location to the new $162 million dedicated building at 700 L'Enfant Plaza, and it reopened to the public on May 12, 2019. The 32,000 square foot L'Enfant Plaza building has a 145-seat theater, rooftop terrace, and top-floor event space. The new museum is a non-profit enterprise.

Educational and cultural programs are offered for students, adults, and families including scholarly lectures, films, book signings, hands-on workshops, and group tour packages. The museum charges admission fees.

On March 1, 2026, the International Spy Museum opened a new special exhibition titled Camouflage: Designed to Deceive. The exhibit presents an immersive examination of the history and application of camouflage across art, nature, military, intelligence, and cultural contexts, featuring four new galleries, each centered on the science of camouflage: Disappear, Distort, Disguise, and Deceive. Utilizing real stories, artifacts, and immersive media, the exhibition reminds us that camouflage is everywhere. It is a descendant of deception that is as old as espionage itself.

== Collection ==
The museum houses more than 7,000 artifacts with around 1,000 on public display, accompanied by historical photographs, interactive displays, film, and video. The permanent collection traces the complete history of espionage, from the Ancient Greeks and the Roman Empire, the Middle Ages, the Renaissance, the British Empire, the American Revolutionary War, the French Revolution, the Napoleonic Wars, the American Civil War, both World Wars, the Cold War, and through present day espionage activity. Items include:

- A Four Rotor Japanese Enigma Machine, built by Germany during World War II for its ally, Japan, allowing German and Japanese soldiers to communicate securely with each other.
- The wreckage of Francis Gary Powers' U-2 plane.
- A 1922 Silver Dollar with Suicide Pin that was made by the CIA for the U-2 program.
- A Bay of Pigs flag. The 2506 Assault Brigade was meant to fly this flag as a symbol of victory following the 1961 invasion attempt.
- A vial of heavy water produced to commemorate WWII's Operation Gunnerside.
- A printing plate used in Operation Bernhard, an exercise by Nazi Germany to forge British bank notes.
- A coat with a buttonhole camera, created by the KGB.
- A c.1949 Steineck ABC Wristwatch Camera from Germany. The watch allowed an agent to take photographs while pretending to check his or her watch.
- A Lipstick Pistol used by KGB operatives during the Cold War.
- A replica of an Aerial Surveillance Pigeon Camera from World War I.
- The Aston Martin DB5 that was used in the movie Goldfinger, the third part of the James Bond film series.

In 2011, the museum had an interactive called Spy in the City where visitors were given a GPS-type device and had to find clues near various landmarks in the area surrounding the museum to obtain the password for a secret weapon.

== See also ==
- CIA Museum
- Imperial War Museum
- National Cryptologic Museum
- Mark Stout
- Vince Houghton
