= Mark Stout =

American historian and museum curator

Mark Stout is an American historian and intelligence studies scholar. Stout is the former chief historian and curator at the International Spy Museum in Washington, D.C. He is currently an adjunct professor at the Catholic University of America. He is retired from Johns Hopkins University, where he directed the Master of Arts in Global Security program for eight years and simultaneously oversaw the Post-Baccalaureate Certificate in Intelligence for four years. Before entering academia, Stout spent over two decades in the United States national security community. He worked for twelve years as an intelligence analyst and manager, and for one year served as Deputy Special Assistant to the Director of Central Intelligence for Foreign Intelligence Relationships. He also worked with the U.S. Army and the Institute for Defense Analyses, where he contributed to the Iraqi Perspectives Project and later directed the Terrorist Perspectives Project, both funded by the Department of Defense.

== Books ==
- Covert Action: National Approaches to Unacknowledged Intervention
- Secrets on Display: Stories and Spycraft from the International Spy Museum
- World War I and the Foundations of American Intelligence
- Spy Chiefs, Volume 1: Intelligence Leaders in the United States and United Kingdom
- The Saddam Tapes: The Inner Workings of a Tyrant’s Regime
- The Terrorist Perspectives Project: Strategic and Operational Views of Al Qaeda and Associated Movements
