= Fiesta del Charco =

Fiesta del Charco (or Embarbascá) is a festive tradition, with centuries of history, that takes place in the municipality of La Aldea de San Nicolás on the island of Gran Canaria, every September 11 to celebrate the patron saint festivities of San Nicholas of Tolentino. It is one of the important, popular and multitudinous festivals celebrated in the Canary Islands.

== Origin ==
The Fiesta del Charco tries to represent and pay homage to the way of life of the Canarian ancestors. This celebration revives an ancient indigenous people fishing technique called embarbascada, which included pouring sap from plants such as cardon or tabaiba to cause a sedative effect on the fish in the puddles of the coast and, thus, to be able to capture them more easily with the hands.

This practice remained alive on the island until the 20th century, and then it became a tradition in the patron saint festivities in the north of the island, where El Charco is located, which gives its name to the tradition. On one side of El Charco are El Alambique and the Cueva de El Roque, a hollow by the sea where the Majorcans, in the mid-14th century, built a hermitage in honor of San Nicolás de Tolentino and, on the other side, the archaeological site of Los Caserones.

Within the festival of San Nicolás de Tolentino, the festival of El Charco is celebrated, since it is a representative and valued element on the island.

== Procedure and rules ==
As ordered by custom, the participants must stand up, surrounding the puddle without touching the water. In order to do so, the outer perimeter of the lagoon is first marked with a line of lime, which must not be exceeded until the starting gun is fired.

On September 11, at five in the afternoon, a rocket launched by the mayor of the municipality gives the signal to start fishing. From that moment, the race of the participants begins, who have to immediately throw themselves into the water en masse to catch the fish with their hands, although it is also allowed to use baskets, thus recalling the origin of the holiday

Usually, given the fun and festive nature of the show, those who enter the water try to bring those who remain on the shore contemplating it inside.

== Location ==
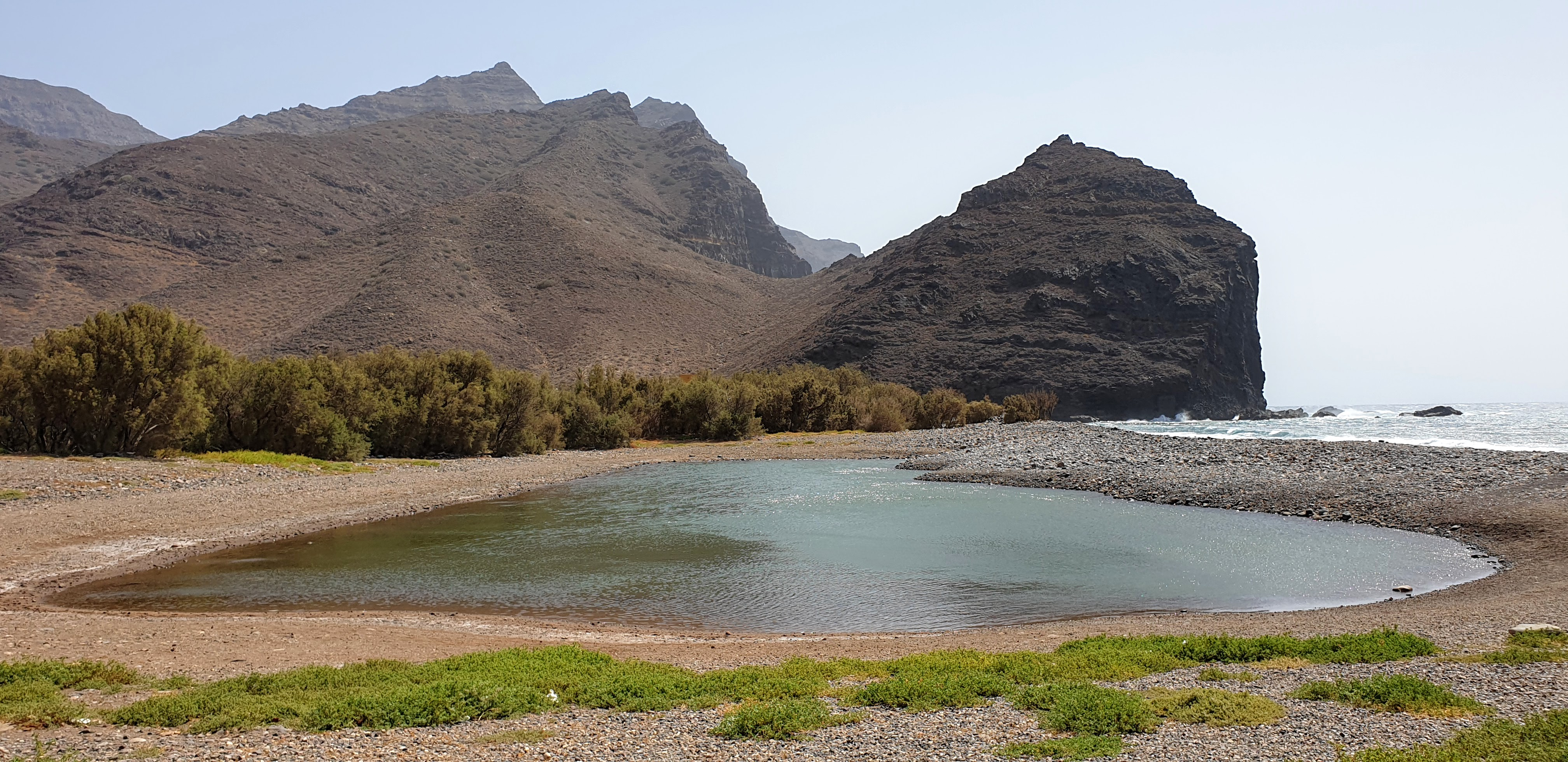
Charco de La Aldea

El Charco, located in La Aldea de San Nicolás, is the natural setting in which the celebration takes place. It is located between the mountains and the Atlantic Ocean, occupying the center of the mouth of the La Aldea ravine, a few meters from the sea.

It is a small coastal lagoon, popularly known in the Canary Islands as marciegas, produced by the flooding and stagnation of seawater due to the rise in sea level at the time of tides in Gran Canaria, added to the contributions of the successive runoffs from the Aldea ravine that occur as a result of the rains.

The usual depth does not usually exceed 1.50 meters and the bottom is made up of sedimentary deposits and boulders from the ravine.

The entire zone consists of an area of 40,286,864 square meters and a perimeter of 1,103,659 meters.
