= Centre de Documentació i Museu de les Arts Escèniques =

Documentation Center and Museum of the Performing Arts
- Centre de Documentació i Museu de les Arts Escèniques
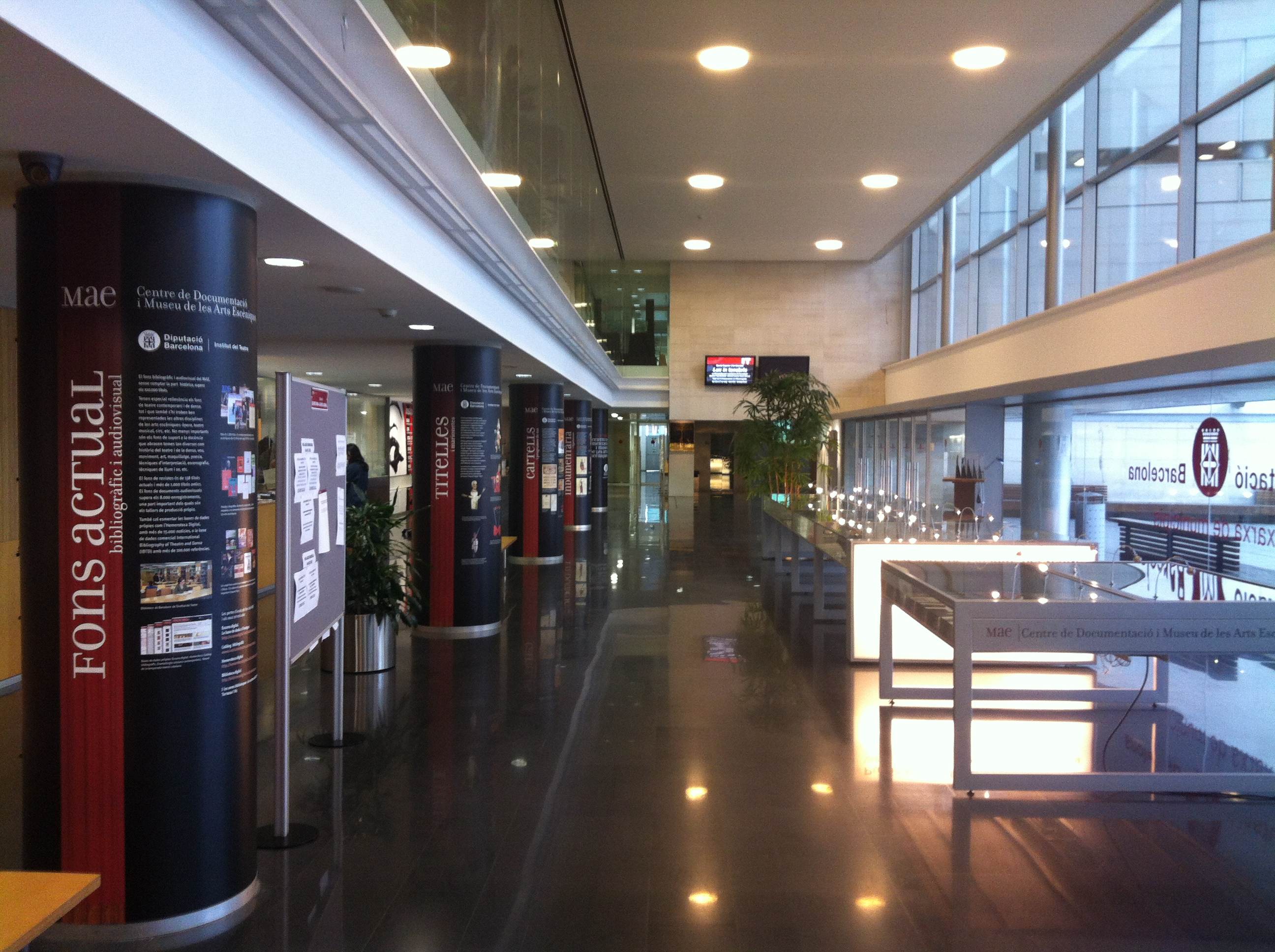
- Museum hall
- Established: 1923
- Location: Barcelona, Spain
- Coordinates: 41.37172839240196°N 2.1578192572256567°E
- Type: Music museum
- Website: http://www.cdmae.cat/

The Centre de Documentació i Museu de les Arts Escèniques (Documentation Centre and Museum of the Performing Arts of the Institut del Teatre), also known as MAE, is a centre for information and research on the performing arts in Catalonia, Spain. The centre has an extensive library, an archive and collections from the Institut del Teatre, which specializes in theatre, dance, opera, zarzuela, music hall, magic and circus performances. Its major collections encompass Catalonia and the Spanish Golden Age. The centre also has posters, programmes, photographs, pictures, puppet theatres, set designs and costumes which are exhibited in temporary exhibitions and online, since it has no permanent exhibition space. The museum is a member of SIBMAS (Société Internationale des Bibliothèques et des Musées des Arts du Spectacle) and ENICPA (European Network of Information Centres of the Performing Arts), and is part of the ECLAP European Project. In Catalonia, it is involved with the Consortium of Academic Libraries of Catalonia.

== History ==
The museum's pioneer was theatre and music critic Marc Jesús Bertran. In 1912, Bertran presented a plan to Barcelona City Council and the Mancomunitat and began collecting objects and documents related to the performing arts.

The Barcelona Museum of Theatre, Dance and Music was created in 1923. Bertran was its first director, and the first exhibition hall opened to the public in the Palau de les Belles Arts. That year the museum became part of the Escola Catalana d'Art Dramàtic, established as part of the cultural policy of the Barcelona Provincial Council (led by Enric Prat de la Riba, and the origin of the Institut del Teatre).

A permanent exhibition space was inaugurated in 1936 at the Casa de la Misericòrdia in Career Elisabets in Barcelona, which remained its home until 1945 (when it moved with the library to the Palau Guell). The museum and library expanded their collections, adding thousands of documentary pieces, unpublished manuscripts, theatrical sketches, photographs, posters, programmes and costumes.

The library and collection of Artur Sedó (1881–1965), a Catalan textile businessman and bibliophile, were added in 1968. With over 90,000 titles this collection made the museum one of the largest theatrical bibliographic collections in Europe, with an outstanding collection of Catalan theatre from the late nineteenth and early twentieth centuries and the Spanish Golden Age.

During the late 1990s renovations began on the Palau Guell, and the MAE moved to a temporary venue in Career Almogàvers (in the Poblenou district) while the Institut del Teatre's permanent home was being built in Montjuïc, Barcelona. The new building opened in 2000, placing the museum, the archive and the teaching and historical libraries under one roof (when it adopted its present name). Since then the museum has focused on the documentation and digitalization of its collection, and in 2010 over 20,000 images were available online.

In March 2011, the Barcelona City Council agreed to transfer the Casa de la Premsa building, designed by the architect Pere Domenech i Roura and built for the 1929 International Exposition, to provide permanent exhibition space for the museum. In August 2012, Coordinator of Culture of the Barcelona Provincial Council Rosa Serra said that the project was being postponed "out of caution."

== Mission ==
The museum aims to preserve Catalan performing-arts memorabilia (such as texts, programmes, theatrical sketches, figurines and costumes), supporting education and research at the Institut del Teatre, disseminating information about and preserving the library, museum and archive collections and responding to information requests about Catalan stage arts.

== Collection ==
The MAE museum has a diverse collection, with more than 500,000 pieces.

=== Archives ===
- Bibliographic archive: Over 125,000 volumes, 5,000 manuscripts, autographs, correspondence and contracts. It includes the Aureliano Fernández Guerra collection: 190 volumes of 12 works each (print and manuscript); the collection of the Dukes of Osuna; the collection of Emilio Cotarelo Mori, comprising nearly 3,000 titles; the Pedro Salvà and Ricardo Heredia collection, created in mid-nineteenth-century Paris; the Joaquin Montaner collection from the sixteenth and seventeenth centuries; the collection of Josep Canals, a Barcelona impresario, and the Lluís Millà collection, comprising about 5,000 titles.
- Audiovisual archive: Over 10,000 video, sound and multimedia recordings
- Clothing collection: Over 1,000 costumes, including those worn by actors Enrique Borras and Margarita Xirgu, dancers Carmen Tórtola Valencia and Carmen Amaya, the baritone Celestino Sarobe, the tenor Francesc Viñas and the soprano Victoria de los Ángeles
- Design collection: Over 7,300 designs created by scenographers Francesc Soler i Rovirosa, Apel·les Mestres, Trabal Altés, Álvaro de Retana, Lluís Labarta, María Araujo and Alexandre Soler.
- Puppets and marionettes: Four hundred thirty-seven pieces of puppetry art, including objects from Didó (Ezequiel Vigués), Anglès, Guinovart, Ingeborg, Vergés and the puppeteer Harry Vernon Tozer, emphasising mid-20th-century Catalan puppet theatre
- Programmes: About 100,000 programmes from shows in Barcelona, Catalonia and Spain from 1860 to the present
- Institutional collections: Teatre el Molino, Teatro Real, Teatre Romea and Centre Dramàtic Vallès
- Personal collections: Aurora Pons, Colita, Enric Guitart, Fabià Puigserver, Franz Joham, Gonzalo Pérez de Olaguer, Mary Santpere, Masó Majó, Mestres Cabanes, Victoria de los Ángeles, Xavier Regàs i Castells.
- Photographic archive: More than 150,000 images of shows, actors, opera singers, composers, musicians, stage designers and authors
- Pictorial collection: About 500 pieces of various types of art (drawings, paintings, prints) from a variety of sources, including Ramon Casas, Santiago Rusiñol and Marià Andreu
- Posters: More than 5,000 European theatrical posters from the nineteenth century to the present, including 1918 and 1923 posters of Ballets Russes performances in Barcelona
- Theatre archive: More than 8,000 documents from authors such as Francesc Soler i Rovirosa, Oleguer Junyent, Salvador Alarma, Maurici Vilomara, Joan Morales, Fèlix Urgellés, Fabià Puigserver and Sigfrid Burmann.

== Library ==
The Documentation Centre and Museum of the Performing Arts has three libraries: one in Barcelona, another in Terrassa and a third in Vic. In 2011, they were visited by a total of 15,330 people.

Museum locations
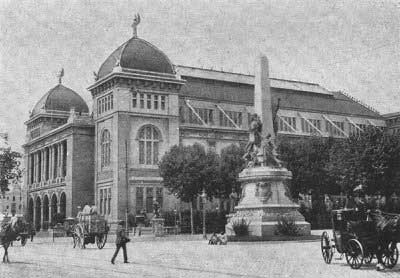
Palau de les Belles Arts (1923-1936)

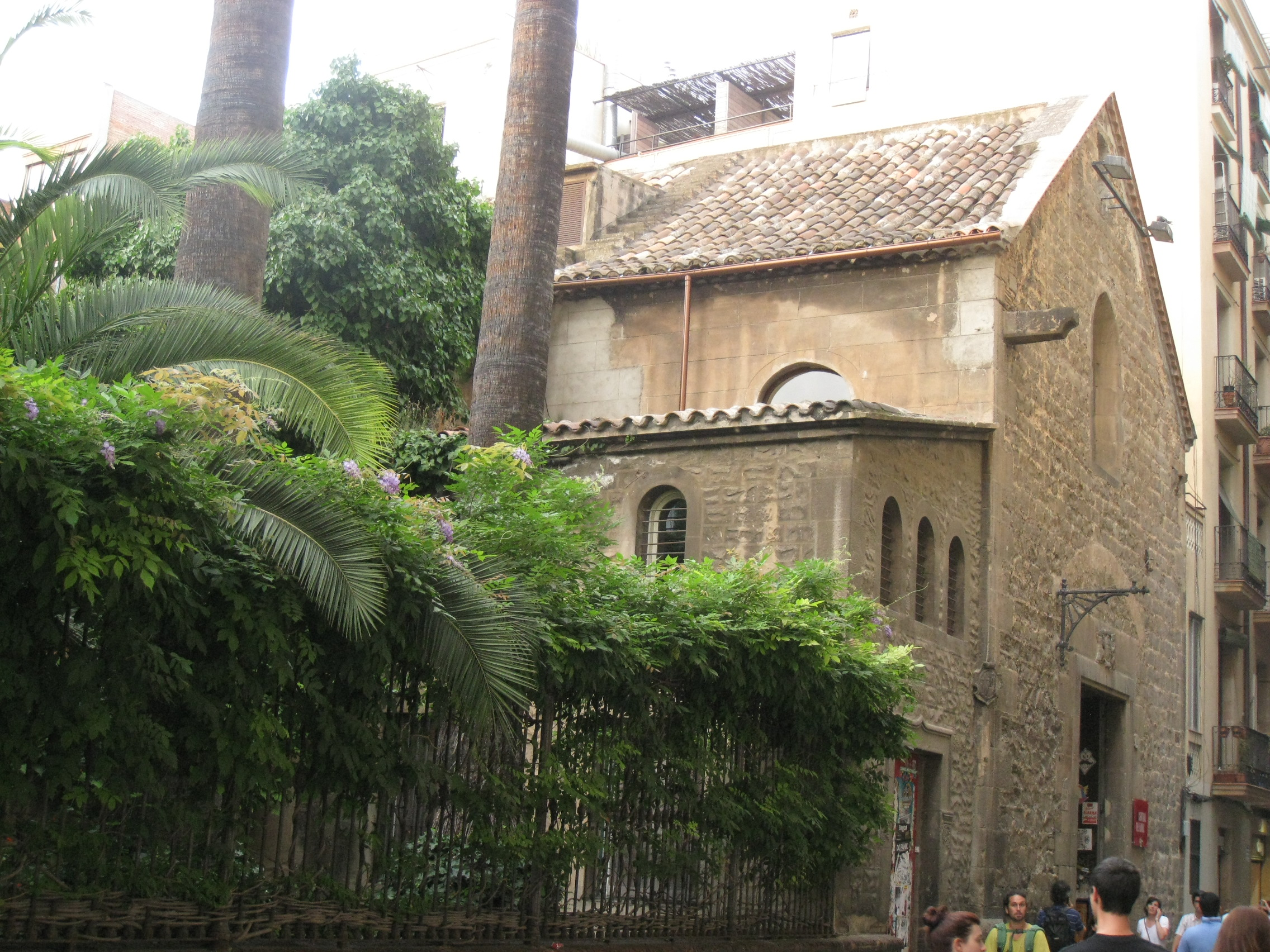
Casa de la Misericordia (1940-1954)

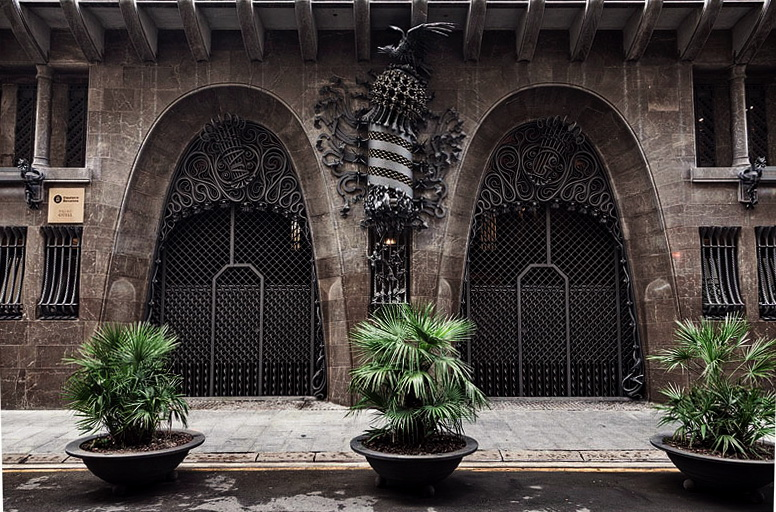
Palau Güell (1954-1996)

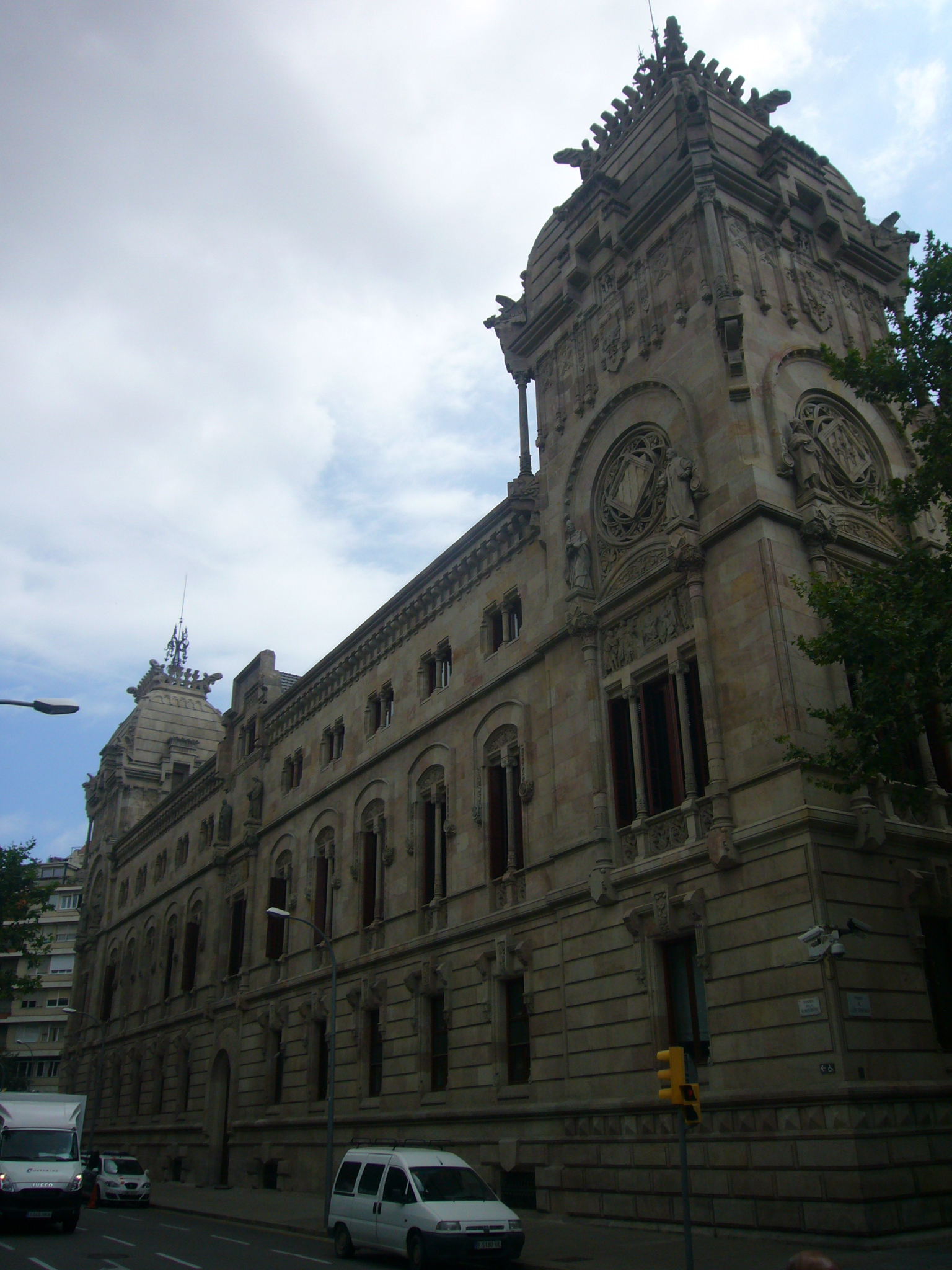
Warehouse (1996-2000)

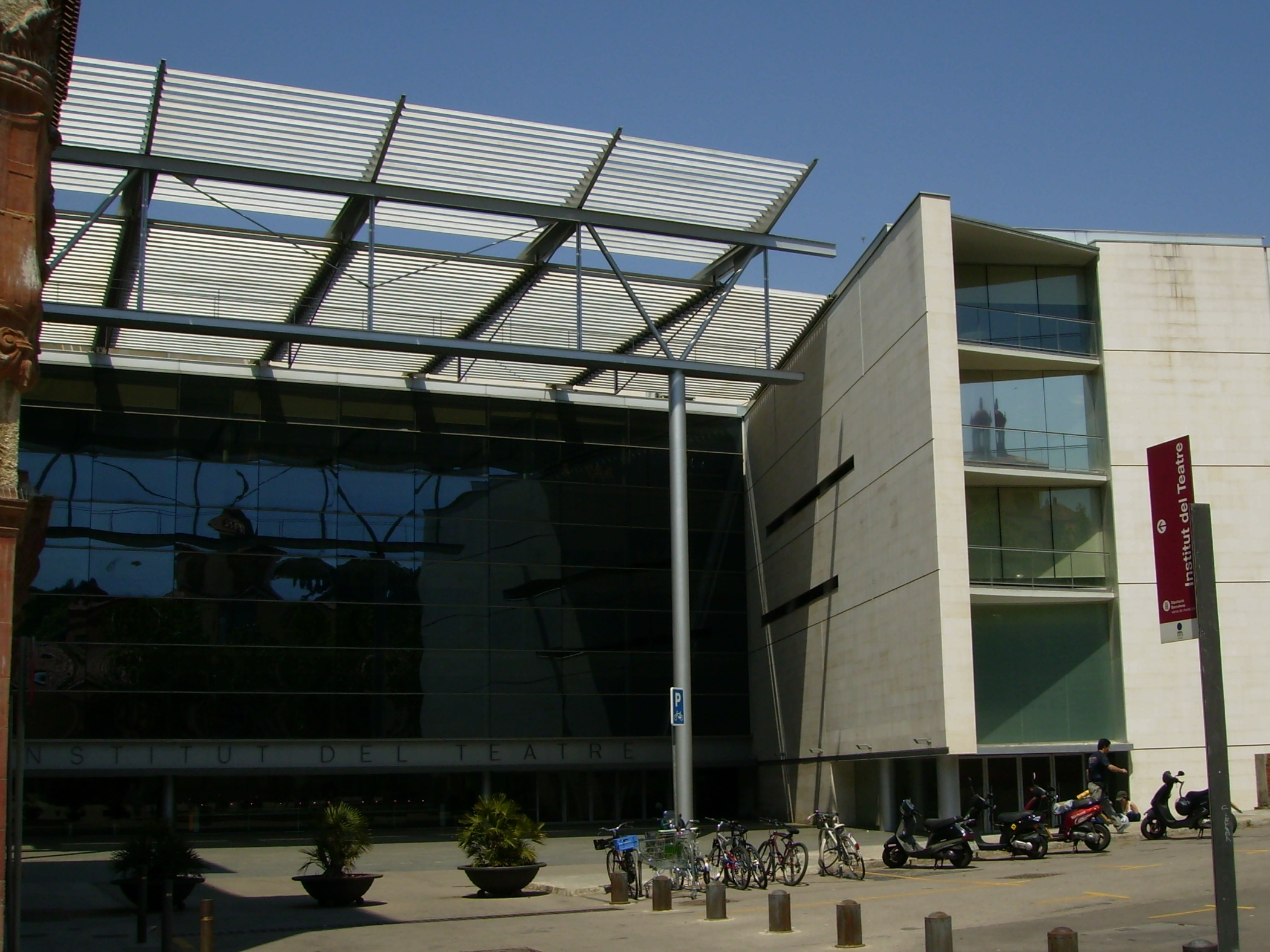
Institut del Teatre (2001-present)

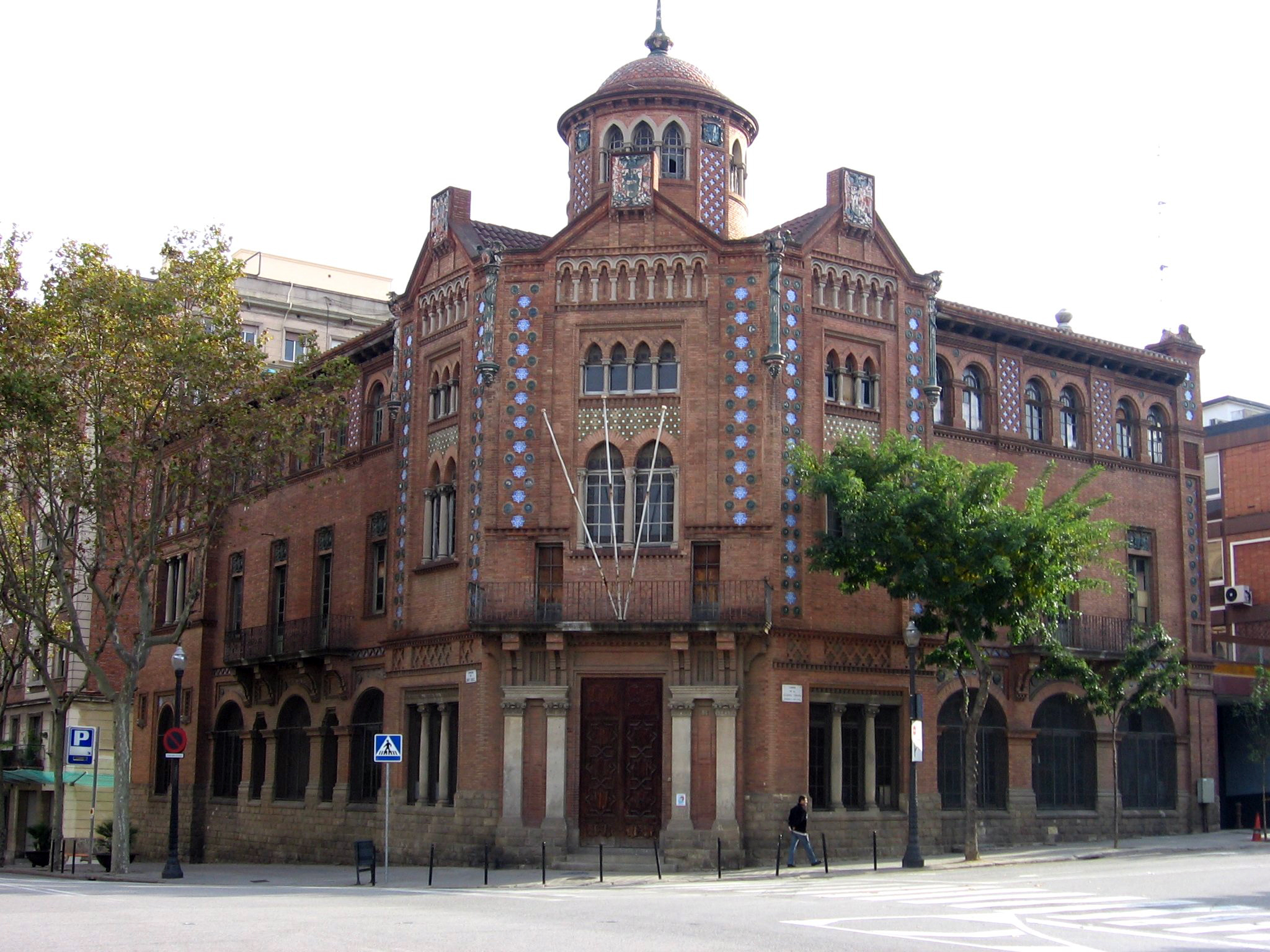
Palau de la Prensa (proposed)
