= Kiss of death (firearm) =

Pistol in the form of a lipstick

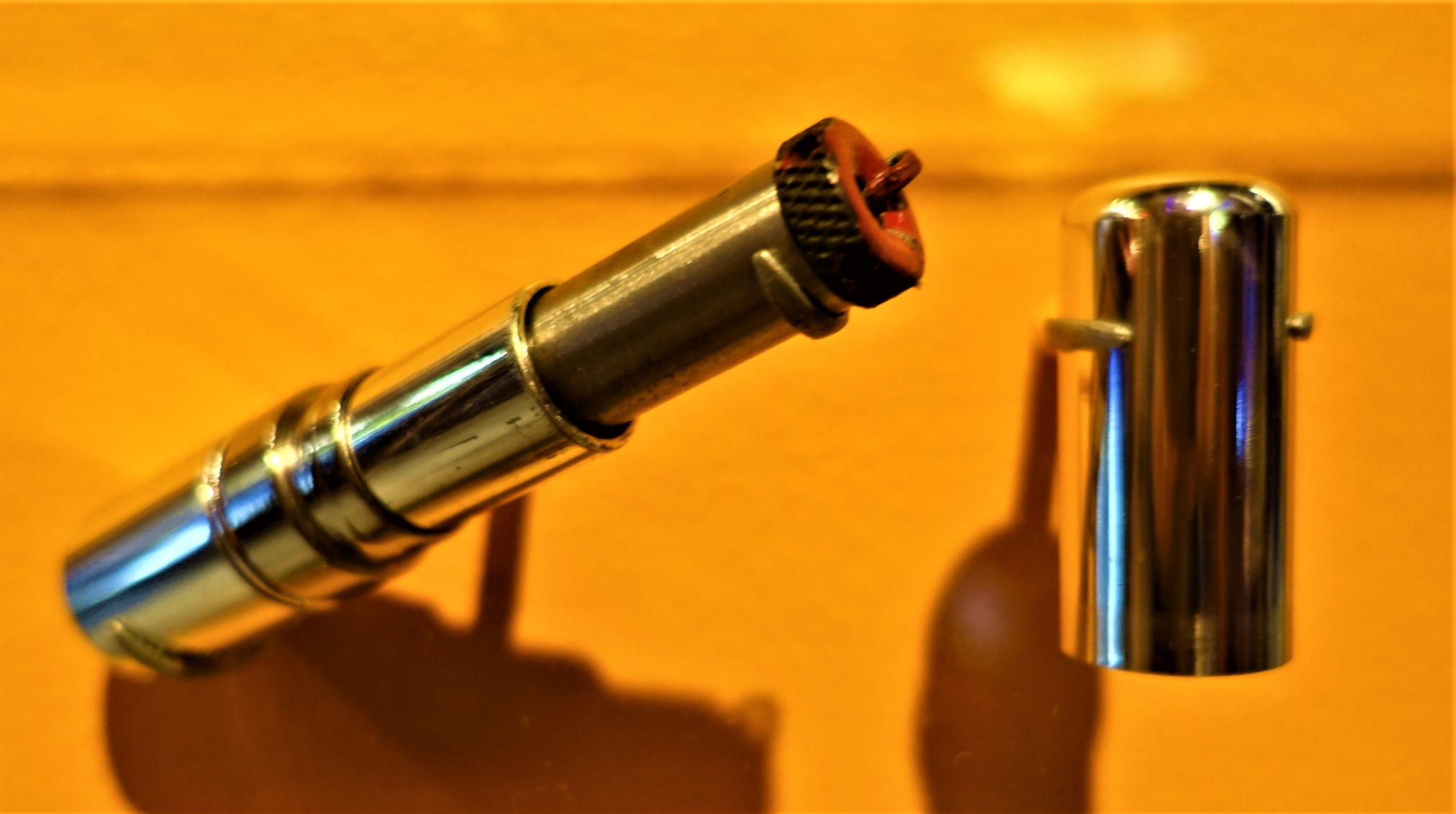
Lipstick pistol

The kiss of death or lipstick pistol was a pistol used by the KGB during the Cold War. It was a single shot 4.5 mm caliber pistol hidden inside a lipstick holder. Being an early, close-range type of improvised firearm or zip gun, the kiss of death worked similarly to many other zip guns — with the tube acting as a barrel and the tip of the lipstick being a singular round. Upon twisting the bottom of the tube, a small hammer would strike the priming of the round, acting as a firing pin and causing the gun to fire.

== Historical usage ==
Engineered by KGB operatives amidst the Cold War, The Kiss of Death could be carried by agents across the West German border for the purpose of assassinating or injuring oppositions of the KGB.

The first example found in West Berlin at an American checkpoint in 1965 is now held by the International Spy Museum in Washington, D.C.

== Kiss of death in media ==
A lipstick gun is used throughout Metal Gear Solid 3: Snake Eater (2004) by EVA, and one is used by Johnny English in Johnny English Reborn (2011). It also appears in Moscow X by David McCloskey.
