= La Aldea de San Nicolás =

- Municipality
- La Aldea de San Nicolás valley

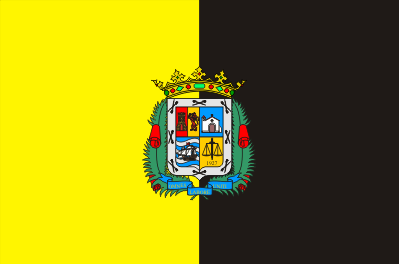
- Flag Coat of arms

- Municipal location in Gran Canaria

- Location in the province of Las Palmas La Aldea de San Nicolás (Canary Islands) La Aldea de San Nicolás (Spain, Canary Islands)
- Coordinates: 27°59′N 15°47′W
- Country: Spain
- Autonomous Region: Canary Islands
- Province: Las Palmas
- Island: Gran Canaria

Area
  - Total: 123.58 km^{2} (47.71 sq mi)
- Elevation: 33 m (108 ft)

Population (2025-01-01)
  - Total: 7,401
  - Density: 59.89/km^{2} (155.1/sq mi)
- Zip code: 35470

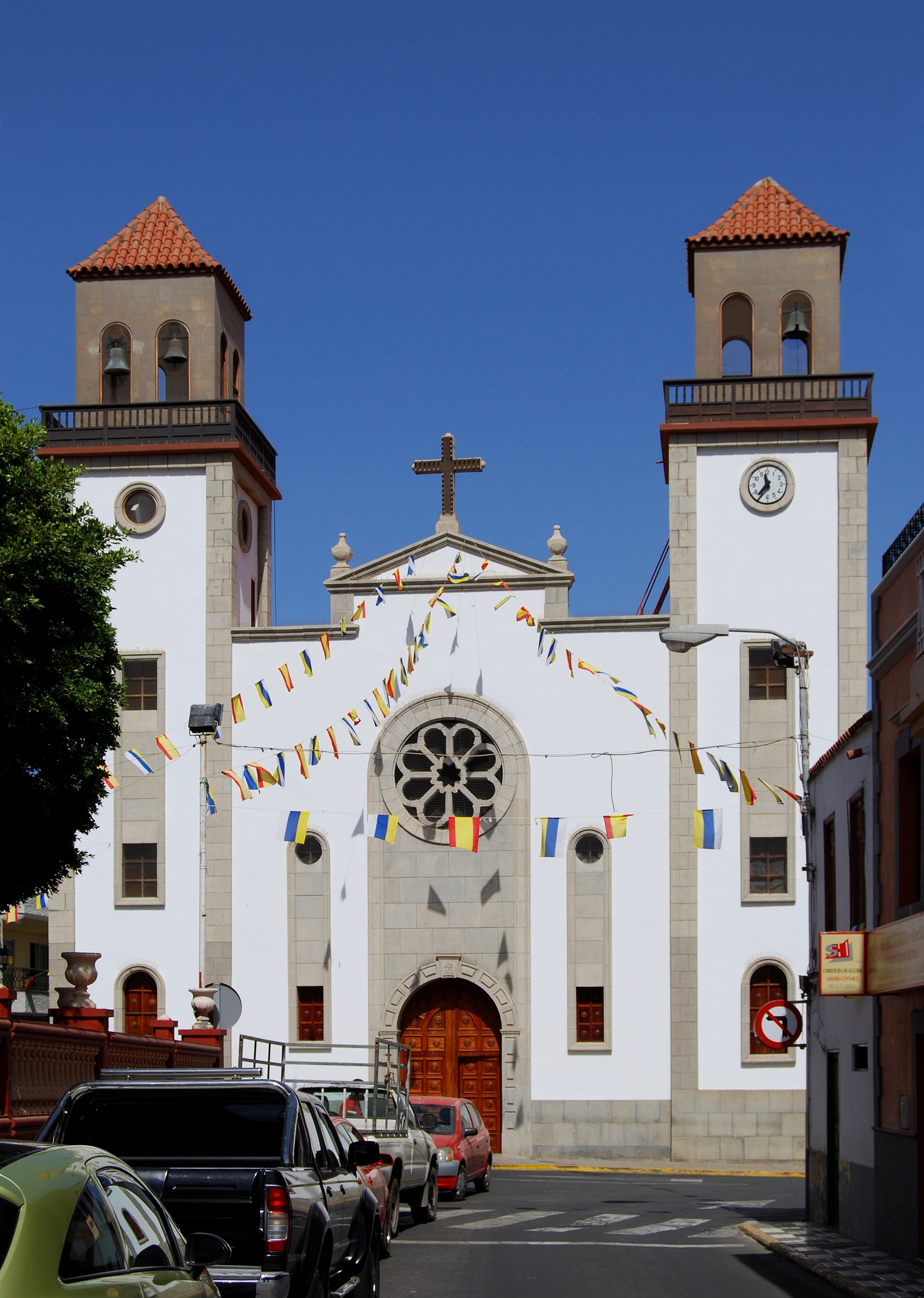
The church of La Aldea de San Nicolás

La Aldea de San Nicolás is the westernmost municipality of the island of Gran Canaria in the Las Palmas province of the Canary Islands. Its full name was, until 2005, La Aldea de San Nicolás de Tolentino, and the locals simply call it La Aldea. Its population is 8,228 (2013), and the area is 123.58 km^{2}. Its elevation is about 33m.

La Aldea de San Nicolás is located about 38 km southwest of the island capital Las Palmas. It is situated among forested mountain valleys overlooking the Atlantic, and most families work on the tomato-farms, as well as growing potatoes and other vegetables and fruits, irrigated by reservoirs that collect winter rain. Tourism is also a significant industry, though not as much as in the South of the island.

San Nicolás is the birthplace of Román Rodríguez Rodríguez, President of the Canary Islands from 1999 to 2003.

== Historical population ==
Historical population

Year	Pop.	±%
1991	7,751	—
1996	8,082	+4.3%
2001	7,668	−5.1%
2002	8,063	+5.2%

Year	Pop.	±%
2003	8,089	+0.3%
2004	7,988	−1.2%
2013	8,228	+3.0%

== See also ==
- List of municipalities in Las Palmas
- Nicholas of Tolentino, a Christian saint
- Fiesta del Charco, a festival of San Nicholas of Tolentino held every September 11
