= Colita =

Spanish photographer (1940–2023)

- Isabel Steva i Hernández
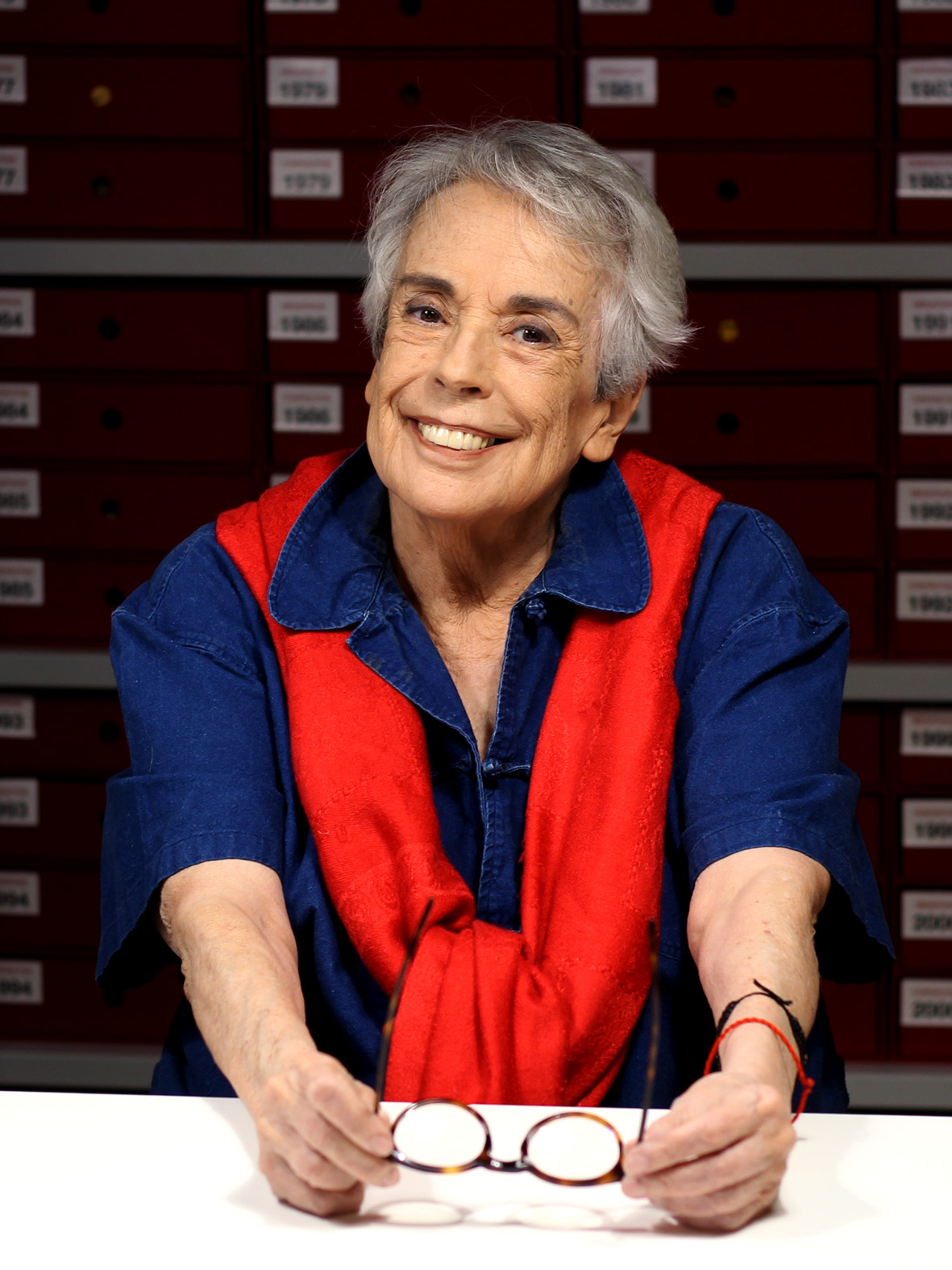
- Colita at the archive, 2021
- Born: Isabel Steva Hernández; 24 August 1940; Barcelona, Spain
- Died: 31 December 2023 (aged 83); Barcelona, Spain
- Known for: Photography
- Movement: Gauche divine
- Awards: Creu de Sant Jordi (2004)
- Website: www.colitafotografia.com

Isabel Steva i Hernández (24 August 1940 – 31 December 2023), whose pseudonym was Colita, was a Spanish photographer. She trained with Xavier Miserachs i Ribalta, and began her professional career in 1961 as a laboratory technician and stylist for Miserachs.

Initially, she demonstrated great interest in dance photography—almost always flamenco music—and later she also specialized in portraits and journalistic photography. She had numerous exhibitions with photographs of Catalan artists and singers from the Nova Cançó era to the present. She published many books.

== Biography ==
Colita was one of the most important Catalan and Spanish photographers of the last quarter of the twentieth century. She began in the world of photography with Xavier Miserachs, for whom she worked as an assistant. During these early years, she was a follower and disciple of Francesc Català Roca and Julio Ubiña. From 1963-75, she focused on creating a series of portraits of Flamenco dancers and singers. As she was linked with the Catalan cultural movements of the era, she was considered the official photographer of Barcelona's gauche divine, a movement of writers, photographers, models, architects, film directors, and many other professionals who began to stand out in that area in their respective fields.

Colita created a series of projects between 1967 and 1979, at the Escola de Cine (Film School) of Barcelona, with directors such as Vicente Aranda and Jaime Camino, who belonged to a film movement born with the idea of creating European, progressive movies in contrast with the official cinematography of the Francoist regime. She collaborated in the promotion of the Nova Cançó, making portraits of the singers in the movement, including Joan Manuel Serrat.

Colita's work in the press was published in magazines such as Siglo XX, Destino, Fotogramas, Interviú, Boccaccio, Primera Plana and Mundo Diario.

Throughout her career, Colita put on more than forty exhibitions and published some fifty books of photographs. Stylistically, she was closer to the ideas of the Barcelona School, although she was considered an all-purpose photographer. Her work is part of the collections of the Museu Nacional d'Art de Catalunya.

Colita died from peritonitis on 31 December 2023, at the age of 83.

== Selected works ==
- Guia secreta de Barcelona (Secret Guide to Barcelona) (1974)
- Els cementiris de Barcelona (Barcelona's cemeteries) (1982)
- L'eixample de Barcelona (1982) (Barcelona's Example Neighborhood) in collaboration with Pilar Aymerich i Puig

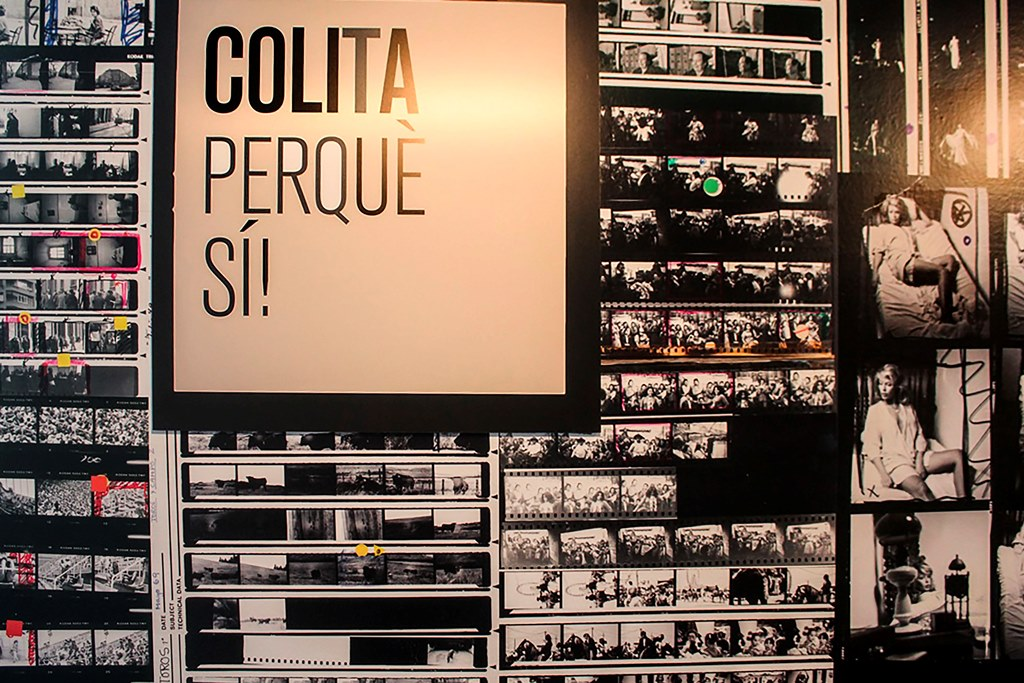
Poster exhibition Colita Perquè Sí

== Important exhibitions ==
- 1979: Espai 13 (Fundació Joan Miró) A rose is a rose, is a rose, is a rose, with Xavier Olivé
- 2014: Casa Milà, Colita perquè sí

== Prizes and accolades ==
- 1998: Artistic Merit Prize from the Ajuntament de Barcelona
- 2004: Creu de Sant Jordi (Sant Jordi Cross) from the Generalitat de Catalunya
- 2013: Premio Nacional de Fotografía Piedad Isla (National Photography Prize of Piedad Isla), awarded by the Diputació de Palencia
- 2008: Premi FAD Sebastià Gasch d'Arts Parateatrals (Sebastià Gasch FAD Prize for Paratheater Arts)
- 2009: Premi 1er. de Maig Joan Reventós a la memòria popular (Joan Reventós May 1 Prize for Popular Culture, Fundació Rafael Campalans
- 2009: Premi a la comunicació no sexista i a la trajectòria periodística (Non-sexist communication and journalist career prizes). Associació de Dones Periodistes de Catalunya (Women Journalists Association of Catalonia)
- 2011: Premi Internacional Terenci Moix (Terenci Moix International Prize), premi especial del jurat (Special jury prize)
- 2012: Honoris Causa, Universitat Autònoma de Barcelona.

== Colita Collection ==
Her work from 1962 to 2002 is conserved at the Museu de les Arts Escèniques (Museum of Performing Arts) of Barcelona. It contains 900 negatives and contact sheets, approximately 32,000 photographs of shows, portraits of artists and celebrities related to the performing arts, and related events. Her collection is registered and catalogued in an internal data base and is not accessible via the internet.

A part of her collection is also conserved in the National Archive of Catalonia. The collection comprises the portraits that Colita made throughout her career as a professional photographer. It is the result of her collaboration with various magazines, of assignments made by the subjects themselves, or simply, for the friendship she shared with them.

Among the great collection of personalities portrayed, we can highlight, among others, those dedicated to musicians and singers. Some of these portraits came out of special assignments. It's also important to point out the photographs taken, mostly in the 1970s, of the members of the Barcelona "Gauche Divine" movement. In addition to the portraits, Colita's collection also contains a series of journalistic photographs covering the social movements of the time. For example, the sit-in at Montserrat, the attack against the Enlace bookstore, the self-mutilations of the COPEL (Spanish inmates group), Catalonia's National Day of 11 September 1978, the ceremony and acts around Franco's death in Madrid, the burial of the President of the Generalitat de Catalunya, Josep Tarrardellas, and various events of the Socialist Party of Catalonia that took place during the 1980s.

Another part of her personal collection is conserved in the Arxiu Fotogràfic de Barcelona (Barcelona Photography Archive). This part of her collection includes Colita's photography from the 1960s to the 1990s. It contains black and white negatives that represent the Nova Cançó musical movement, color photographs that portray community festivals throughout Catalonia, cultural personalities and celebrities and the evolution of architecture in the city of Barcelona. One of the highlights in this material is a good deal of Colita's photographic production on the world of flamenco.

Finally, a collection of 6,987 photographs that correspond to movies, actors, film shootings, and studio portraits is conserved in the Filmoteca de Catalunya (Catalonia Film Archive), including images from shooting Dante no es únicamente severo (Jacinto Esteva, 1968), Los Tarantos (Francesc Rovira-Beleta, 1963), and Tatuaje (Bigas Luna, 1976). A selection of these images is available in the Filmoteca de Catalunya's digital archive.

== Legacy ==
In a popular referendum in Palafrugell in March 2010, Colita was chosen as a woman who deserves to have a street named after her.
