= The Kiss of Death (sculpture) =

Marble sculpture in Poblenou Cemetery in Barcelona

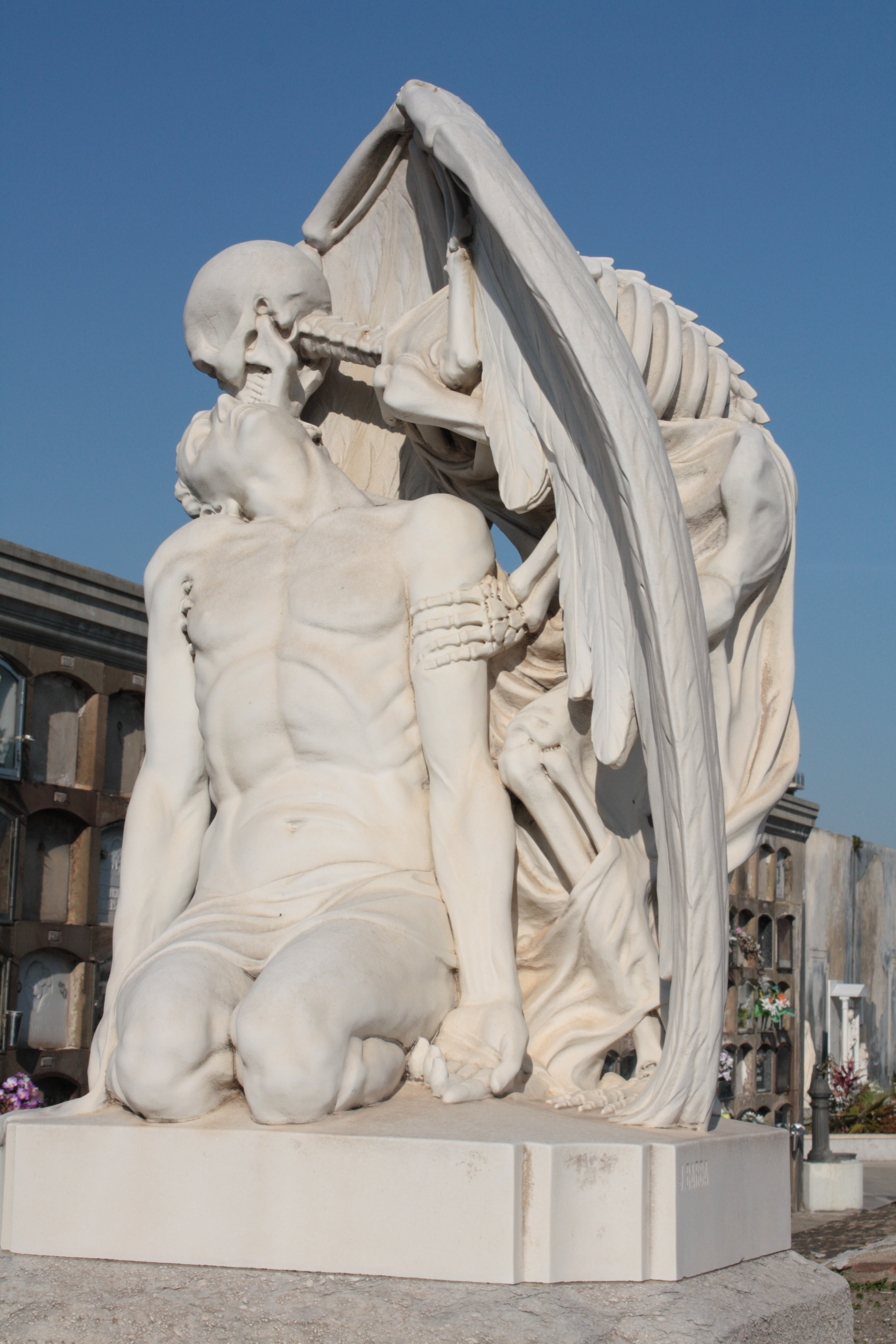
- The Kiss of Death
- Artist: Thought to be Jaume Barba, or Joan Fontbernat
- Year: 1930
- Type: Marble
- Medium: Sculpture
- Location: Poblenou Cemetery, Barcelona; 41°23′46″N 2°12′15″E

The Kiss of Death (Catalan: El petó de la mort), is a marble sculpture located in the Poblenou Cemetery in Barcelona. The sculpture is believed to have been crafted by Jaume Barba in 1930, as his signature is present on the side of the sculpture. However, some suggest that it might have been designed by Barba's son-in-law, Joan Fontbernat. The sculpture serves as an example of memento mori, portraying death as a winged skeleton bestowing a kiss on the forehead of a young man.

== Background ==
The sculpture marks the grave of Josep Llaudet Soler, a former textile manufacturer. The base of the tombstone features a verse from Jacint Verdaguer, a prominent Catalan poet. The verse expresses the idea that the person's youthful heart can no longer continue, their blood slows and freezes, their spirit embraces lost faith, and they feel the kiss of death as they fall. It is frequently mentioned that the sculpture served as inspiration for Ingmar Bergman's film, The Seventh Seal.

== Imagery ==
The sculptor chose a winged skeleton instead of an angelic representation of death. In doing so, the tombstone portrays the young person's reaction to death, leaving the interpretation of their expression as either ecstatic or horrified uncertainty.
