= Institut del Teatre =

Coordinates: 41.3712°N 2.1578°E

- Plaça Margarida Xirgu, s/n Institut del Teatre de, 08004 Barcelona, Catalonia, Spain

Information
- School type: Public
- Established: 1913
- Founder: Adrià Gual
- Status: Active
- Specialist: Ballet. Drama. Arts
- President: Marc Castells Berzosa
- Gender: Co-educational
- Age: 12 to 25
- Enrollment: Approximately 800
- Campuses: Escola Superior d'Art Dramatic, Conservatori Profesional de Dansa, Conservatori Superior de Dansa, Escola Superior de Tècniques de les Arts del espectacle
- Website: institutdelteatre.cat

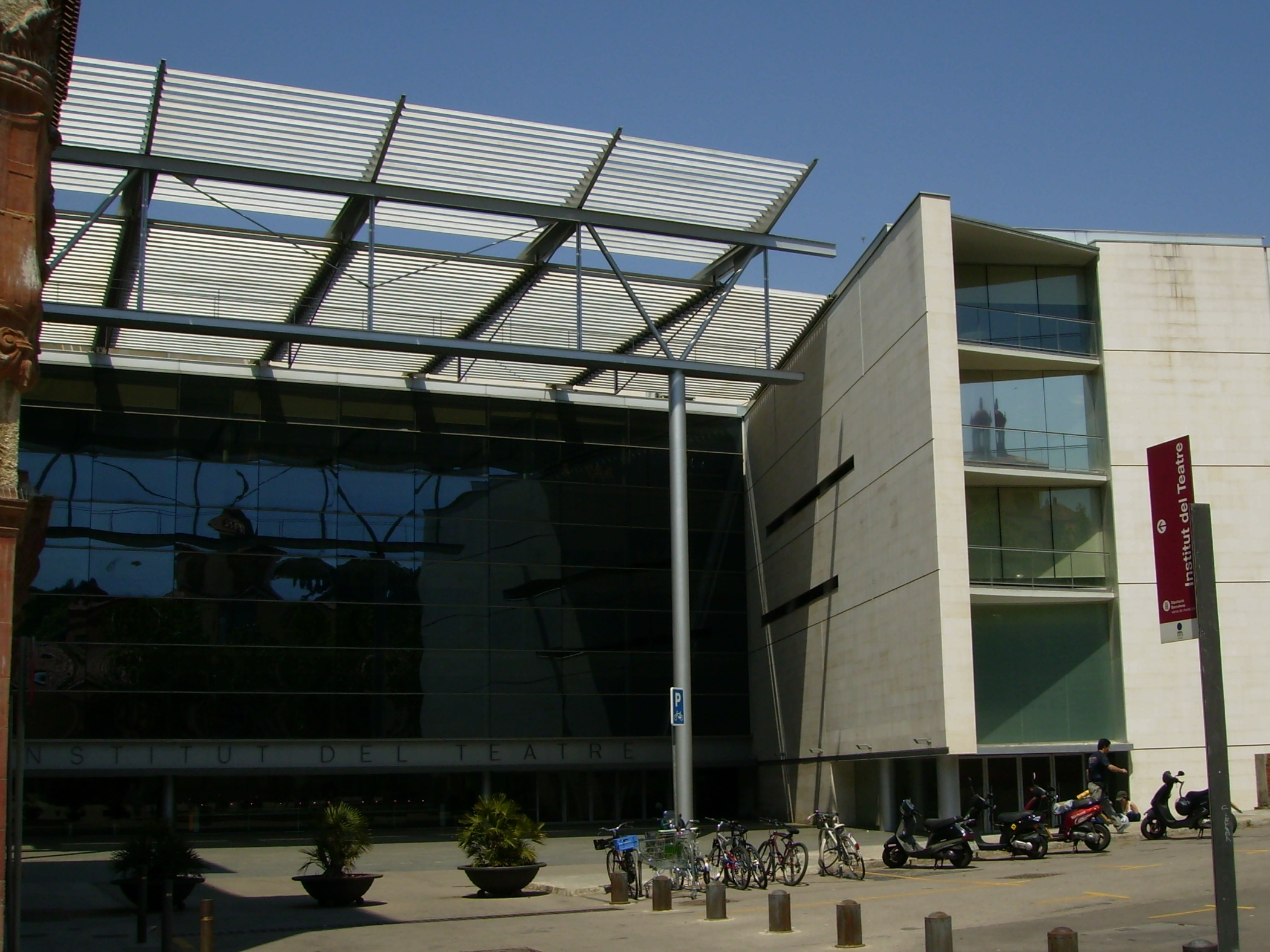

The Theatre Institute of Barcelona (Catalan: Institut del Teatre de Barcelona) is a public institution dedicated to training in the performing arts, classical dance, contemporary and Spanish as well as in theater, film, choreography, etc. It was created in 1913 in Barcelona by Adrià Gual. It belongs to the Province of Barcelona and aims to teaching the performing arts, the organization of congresses, conferences, exhibitions, and research of any form of performing arts. It is currently led by Jordi Font.

== Organization ==
The continuous growth of the institution and the complexity of its management, derived mainly from the diverse legal regulations and standards that are applied in one or another area of his performance - advised, in 1990, constituted the as an autonomous body, which also allows you to streamline management and improve resource utilization. The autonomous body Theatre Institute of Barcelona Provincial Council, therefore, is endowed with legal personality and its own patrimony, with the ability to act necessary for the fulfillment of its purposes. These purposes are: The formal education and non- formal education of the performing arts. The production and organization of conferences, courses, conferences, festivals, exhibitions and other activities and training in various specialties and promotion of the performing arts. The publishing activities, documentation, research and research in the field that is proper. The Theatre Institute is governed by General Statutes and Regulations approved by the Board of the Province of Barcelona in 2001 and 2002 respectively, by the Organic Regulation of the Province of Barcelona and the local legislation and sectoral legislation Teaching art and culture by regulating the activity of the Institute. Consists of a General Council, a Governing Board and a Management Board as the governing bodies.

== History ==
1913-1939: from the founding to defeat republicana. 1913: creation of the Escola Catalana d'art Dramàtic (ECAD), within the framework of the Conservatori del Liceu, from 1837 (Liceu Filarmònico-Dramàtic de Montsió) because it contained dramatic disciplines. This is one of the first works of cultural Affairs of Enric Prat de la Riba, still from the Diputació de Barcelona. Adrià Gual is the founder-director. Their idea is to articulate a platform that addresses education, research, creation and dissemination, so that it constitutes a powerful instrument for the modernisation of the Catalan scene.

1915: Autonomisation of the ECAD, with a Board of Trustees itself created by the provincial government. 1917: the Barcelona City Council joins the Board of Trustees, along with the provincial government. Publication of the "Catalan Gazette of dramatic Art".

1919: Award for dramatic works. 1920: Created the Mancomunitat de Catalunya, occupies the site of the provincial government on the board of trustees.

1923: Incorporation, ECAD, the Museum of theatre, dance and music of the Barcelona City Council (created by Marc-Jesus Bertrand). Home of the studies of Scenography. Beginning of the publication of the Theatrical Library. Primo de Rivera's dictatorship: the difficulties and the Hispanicization. 1926: Dissolved the Commonwealth, the County Council alone assumes ECAD.

1927: change of name: Institut del Teatre.

1929: Congress of the Universal Society of theatre and of the international exhibition of theatre. 1930: rejoins the Ajuntament de Barcelona. 1931: the Government is responsible exclusively. First Elisabets Street her stable.

1934: Adrià Gual relief by Joan Alavedra and highlight this in the wake of the Events of October ". Interim management: professor Henry Gimenez.

1939-1970: Under the franquisme

1939: Franco. Government in exile. Wastewater treatment of teachers. Hispanicization. The provincial government alone bore back to the Institute. Guillermo Díaz-Plaja, director. Small studies in scenography and Declamation. Open to the public library and the Museum.

1944: integration of the Institute within the Conservatory of music and Declamation. Development of dance studios. Recognition of official validity of studies.

1952: the Institute becomes a school of dramatic Art and dance. Director Artur Carbonell.

1954: opening the Museum of performing arts at the Palau Güell, with Bilbioteca and the file.

1957: start of the publication of the magazine "Estudios Escénicos". 1968: acquisition of valuable background of Artur Sedó (more than 90,000 titles). 1970-1988: The Refoundation of the Institute, 1970: Long crisis. Director: Hermann Bonnin. Catalanization. Extension with the departments of contemporary dance, MIME and pantomime, puppets and marionettes audiovisual language and theatre Science.

1973: First International Festival of Puppets.

1974: Home drama Centre of the Vallès. Home Cinema section Fructuoso Gelabert within the Museum Library. 1975: publication of Monographs collection.

1976: creation Centre for studies and documentation of the Arts and communication, with Xavier Fàbregas at the helm. Home Center of Osona. Award of the Ignasi Iglesias Prize and Josep Maria de Sagarra.

1978: XIII Congress of the international society of Libraries and museums of the Arts of spectacle, held at the Institute.

1980: crisis with the provincial government. Cessation of Hermann Bonnin. Establishment of a Management Committee. Attempt at quartering of the Institute.

1981: Josep Earliest, director. Transfer to the street Sant Pere Més Baix.

1985: International Congress of theatre, at the Institute.

1986: secondment to the Universitat Autònoma de Barcelona: qualifications endorsed as diplomas.

1988-2012: towards the "University of Performing Arts" 1988: Jordi Coca, director.

1990: participation in the gestation of the LOGSE. New study plans that give off. 1992: Paul Monterde, director. Home new studies. specialities of acting, stage design and direction-Dramaturgy.

1995: start of the studies of the degree of Professional dance.

1997: beginning of Technical studies of the spectacle, with Superior Cycle format of FP: specialties of sound, lighting and stage machinery. Creation of "IT dance".

2000: new headquarters in the city. New Statutes: the Institute as an educational, cultural, conglomerate of research and dissemination, along the lines of the original project. Home high school integrated studies and dance.

2001: start of higher education in dance.

2002: General Regulation of the Institute. Crisis of growth. Director: Josep Earliest, who dies. New director: Jordi Font.

2003: Progressive settlement of the Institute to the new headquarters and to the new organization. Update of the labour regime of the teaching staff.

2004: the Institute promotes a public statement (February), signed by twenty-four higher schools of theater, music and dance from all over the State, in favor of legislation that would complete the definitive and specific incorporation of artistic education to higher education. Notice, by the Institute, "Classroom ARCA", meeting of the higher schools of theater, music and dance from all over the State to delve into the February statement. The article "Por la excepción are artistic in las enseñanzas superiores" (Jordi Font) in the Spanish press unleashes the official dialogue. Commissioned by the Ministry of education, the Institute prepared the document "The ecosystem inútiles para el desarrollo de las enseñanzas artísticas superiores normal".

2005-09: Digitization of the collection of the Museum of the Performing Arts, giving rise to "Digital Scene", with the collections of scenography, puppets, posters, clothing, art Fund ...

2006: Enacted the LOE in line claimed by the Institute, this promotes and initiates the elaboration of joint curricular schools of dramatic art and dance schools.

2007-09: decisive role of the Institute in the artistic education Council of the United States: Jordi Font, speaker of the Royal Decree of dramatic Art and a member of the presentation of the Royal Decree of sort order.

2010: artistic teachings become full-fledged subjects of the European space of higher education. Momentum, at the Institute, of the process of elaboration of new curricula of degree of Drama and Dance Degree and postgraduate research and deployment. The Institute is, in fact, the "University" of the Performing Arts. Signing of the agreement, with the city of Barcelona, for the transfer of the "Pavilion of the press" of the exhibition of 1929 to install it there is the permanent exhibition of the Museum of the Performing Arts.

2011: startup, with the Department of education, the process of normalization of the qualification of the teaching staff at disfuncionada. The process of working together, according to the Department of education, between the Institute (Professional-grade integrated centre of dance and the ESO) and Oriol Martorell school, for the articulation of the integrated public dance. It comprises four schools ( the School of Dramatic Art and Dance Conservatory centers where you can study for a higher degree, the Secondary School for Artistic / Professional Dance Conservatory center that integrates secondary education with dance studios, and the Technical College of the Performing Arts, which offers vocational training top ), a Documentation Centre and Museum of the Performing Arts and five theater rooms . Is headquartered in Barcelona and two regional centers in Terrace and Vic. Throughout its hundred years of existence, the Institute has trained hundreds of famous actors in theater, film, set designers, directors, playwrights, technicians, dancers and artists in general in Spain. Emma Vilarasau, Albert Boadella, Aurora Bautista, the three members of Tricicle (Carles Sans, Joan Gràcia and Paco Mir), Carme Elias, Marina Gatell, Laia Marull, Jordi Molla and Montse Guallar, Xavier Alberti, Ramon Ivars Isidre Prunés, Montse Amenós, Paco Azorin, Bibiana Puigdefàbregas, Anna Alcubierre, are just some examples.

== Studies ==
The Theatre Institute is currently made up of several schools specializing in various areas, and granting official titles of various levels:

The Superior School of Dramatic Art (Escola Superior d' Art Dramatic, ESAD) grants equivalent to a university degree advanced degrees in three specialties: Address and Dramatúrgia, Scenery, and Interpretation (options text theater, physical theater, theater puppets and objects, and musical theater).

The Superior Conservatory of Dance (Conservatori Superior de Dansa, CSD) provides equivalent university degree in two specialties advanced degrees: Dance Pedagogy, Choreography and Interpretation Techniques of Dance.

Ballet Conservatory of Barcelona (Escola d' Ensenyament Secundari i Artístic / Conservatori Professional de Dansa, EESA / CPD). Awarded the title of Secondary Education and Professional title, contemporary, classical or Spanish dance.

Technical College of the Performing Arts (Escola Superior de Tècniques de les Arts de l'Espectacle, ESTAE). Gives equivalent to a higher vocational training course in the fields of sound engineers, lighting and stage machinery diplomas.

Centre de Documentació i Museu de les Arts Escèniques The Theatre Institute also has a Documentation Centre and Museum of the Performing Arts Theatre Institute with a library collection of over one hundred thirty thousand titles, developing curricula and research and organizes activities and exhibitions on culture and entertainment history.
