= Poblenou Cemetery =

Cemetery in Barcelona, Spain

Coordinates: 41°23′46″N 2°12′11″E

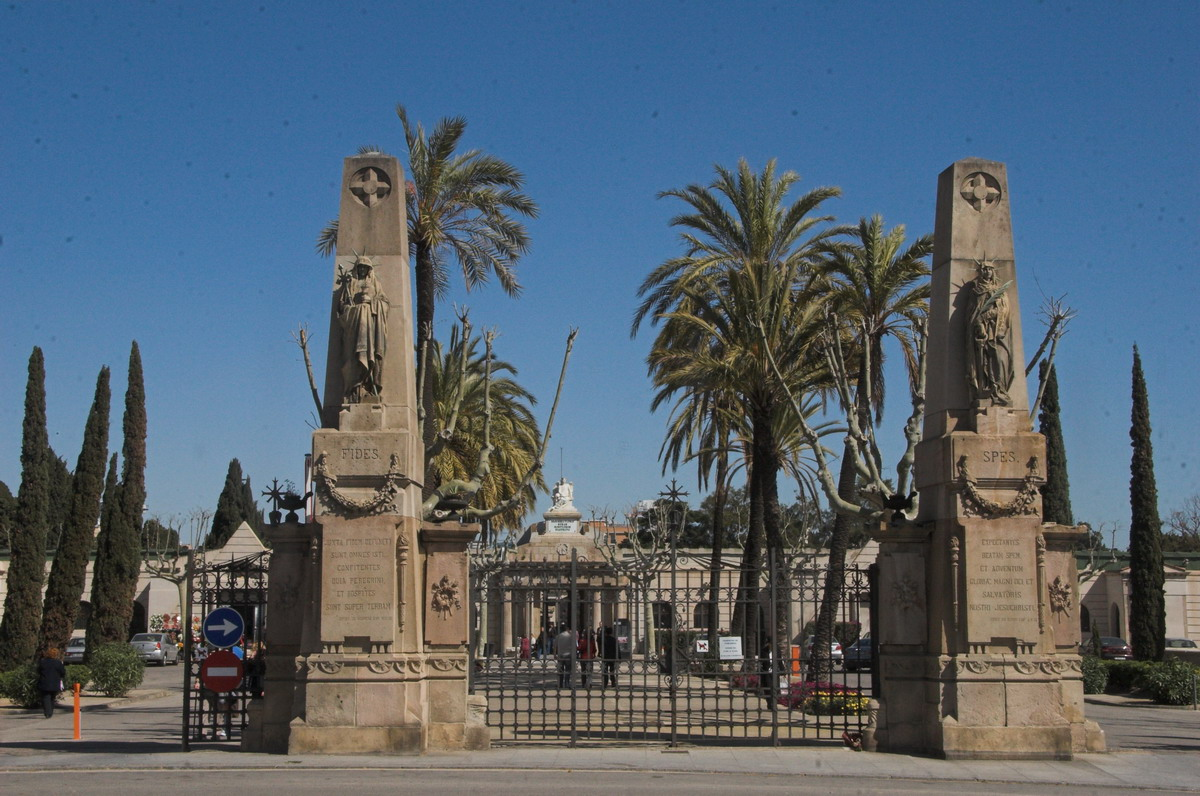
The entrance to the cemetery

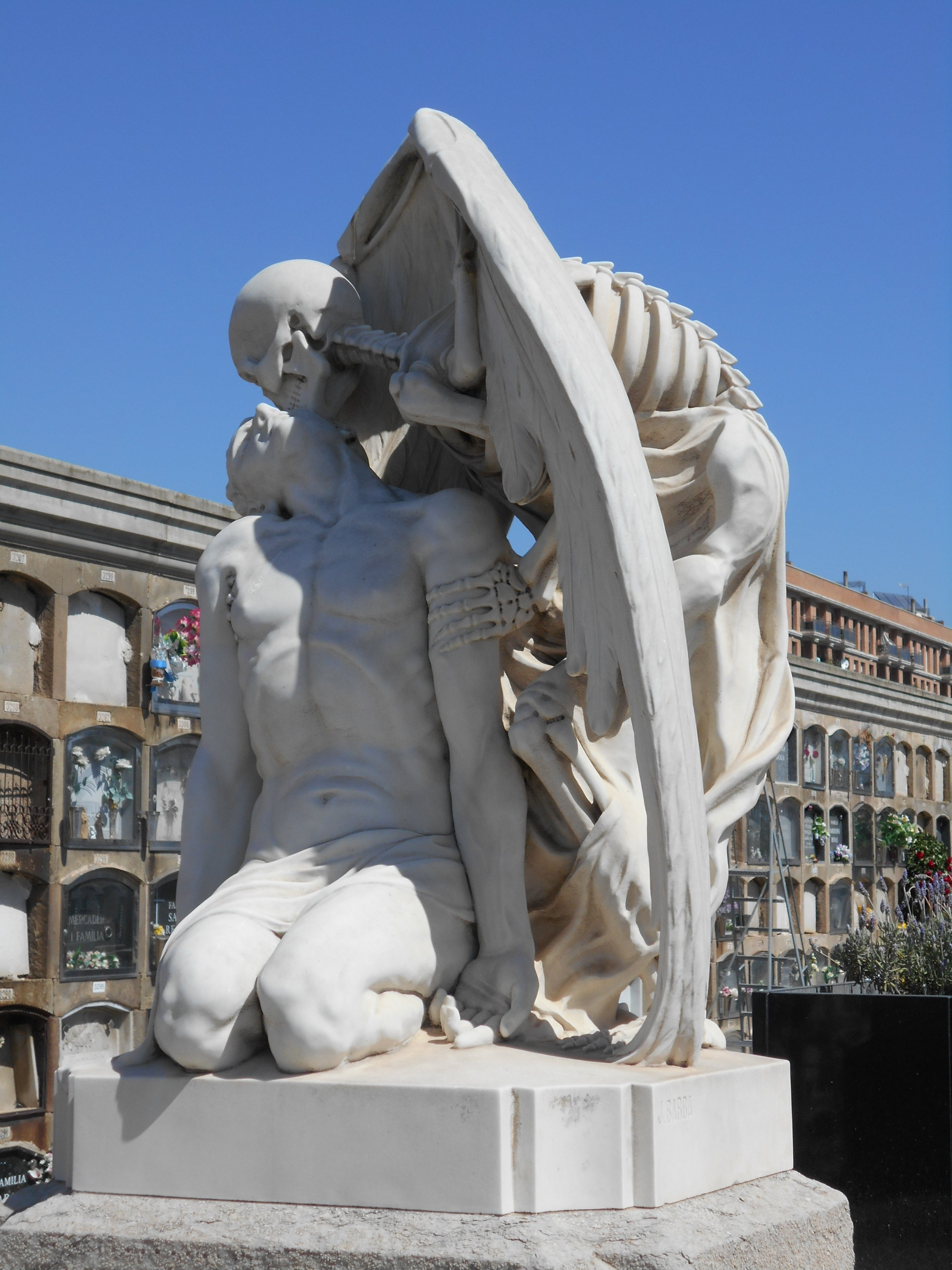
The Kiss of Death (1930), (probably) by Jaume Barba

Poblenou Cemetery (Catalan: Cementiri de Poblenou; Spanish: Cementerio de Pueblo Nuevo) is located in the neighbourhood of the same name in Barcelona. It is also called East Cemetery (Cementiri de l'Est) or General Cemetery (Cementiri General). It is located in calle de Taulat, with the main entrance at Avenida Icària.

The first cemetery at this location was built in 1775, located outside the city's perimeter wall, as the state of churchyard graves inside the old city was considered unsanitary. After the first cemetery was destroyed by Napoleon's troops in 1813, the Italian architect Antonio Ginesi was commissioned to rebuild it, and the new site was reconsecrated by Bishop Pau de Sitjar i Ruata on 15 April 1819. It was formally opened in 1898 by the Bishop of Barcelona Josep Climent i Avinent.

The cemetery consists of two large sections: at the front Ginesi created egalitarian terraces of burial niches, while at the rear there is an area of individual monuments and mausolea, crafted for the aesthetic tastes and aspirations of the wealthy bourgeoisie, merchants and manufacturers of the city. A third, narrow section along the South wall mixes niches, monuments and common graves.

The sculpture above the grave of Josep Llaudet Soler is often cited as Poblenou's best-known monument. Known as The Kiss of Death (El petó de la mort in Catalan or El beso de la muerte in Spanish), the work dates to 1930 and depicts a winged skeleton kissing the cheek of a young man's apparently lifeless body. The name of the artist Jaume Barba is carved into the base, though some believe the work is the idea of Joan Fontbernat.

== Notable burials ==
- Valentí Almirall i Llozer, Catalan nationalist and politician
- Lola Anglada, illustrator
- Xavier Benguerel, author
- Francesc Canals i Ambrós, "Santet", a young man of Barcelona of humble origin who died at age 22, to whom miracles are popularly attributed
- Anselmo Clavé, musician and politician
- José Mariano de Cabanes, mayor of Barcelona
- José Luis de Vilallonga, writer, actor and aristocrat
- Josep Llimona i Bruguera, sculptor
- Miguel Llobet, classical guitarist
- Narcís Oller, author
- Manuel Porcar i Tió, mayor of Barcelona
- Ramon Reventós i Farrarons, architect
- Jordi Sabater i Pi, ecologist and primatologist
- Mary Santpere, actress
- Cast Sendra i Barrufet (Cassen), actor
- Carmen Tórtola Valencia, ballerina

== See also ==
- Montjuïc Cemetery
