= Josep Maria de Sagarra =

Catalan writer

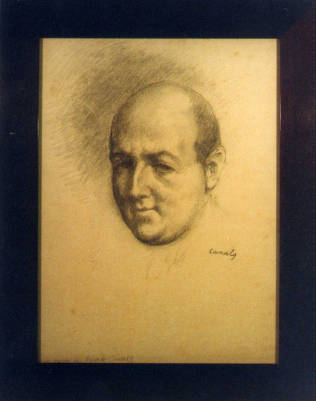
- Born: Josep Maria de Sagarra i de Castellarnau; 5 March 1894; Barcelona
- Died: 27 September 1961 (aged 67); Barcelona
- Resting place: Montjuïc Cemetery
- Occupations: Writer, translator, playwright
- Children: Joan de Sagarra
- Writing career
- Language: Catalan, Spanish
- Genre: Novel

Josep Maria de Sagarra i de Castellarnau (Barcelona, 5 March 1894 – 27 September 1961) was a Catalan-language writer from Barcelona, Catalonia.

== Biography ==
Born in Barcelona in 1894, in the breast of a family of the Catalan nobility being son of the historian and sigilógrafo Fernando de Sagarra i de Siscar. He attended a Jesuit high school and studied law at the University of Barcelona, initially with the purpose of entering into a diplomatic career. However, he quickly decided to become a writer and at the age of 18 won a prize of poetry in the Floral Games. He became a full-time journalist who worked as a correspondent in Germany and as a theatrical critic.

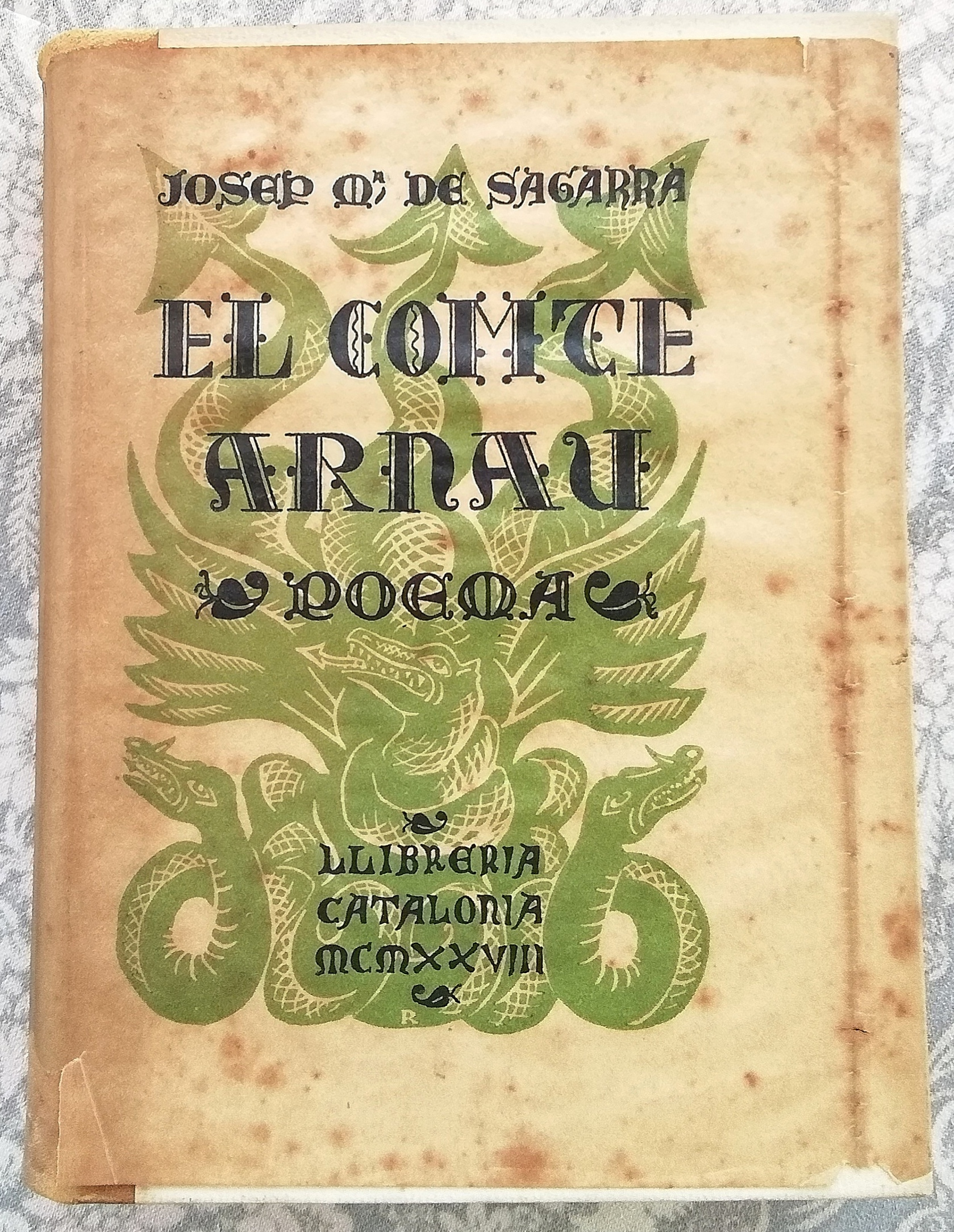
El Comte Arnau (Count Arnau) by Josep M. de Sagarra, first original edition 1928. Long epic poem

However, his main work developed in the field of literature, especially in theatre and poetry, that he wrote always in Catalan. He collaborated with assiduity in the press, especially in La publicidad and Mirador. It suits to remark also his work as a translator: the Divine comedy of Dante, and the theatre of Shakespeare, Molière and Gogol. Part of his poetry was inspired by the popular chansonnier and by well-known ancient legends, what turned him into a very popular poet that, in many respects, occupied the place that had left empty Frederic Soler, Verdaguer, Guimerà or Maragall.

In 1955 he won the National Prize of Theatre for La Ferida Luminosa, whose version in Spanish was made by José María Pemán. In the last years of life he was a member of the Institute of Catalan Studies, the Academy of the Good Letters, General Council of Authors of Spain and the Board of the Big Cross of Alfonso X the Wise person. After a long illness, he died in Barcelona on 27 September 1961, and was laid to rest on the Cemetery of Montjuïc.

A good part of his works have been translated to several languages and some have been adapted to the cinema (El cafè de la Marina and La herida luminosa). His poems have been set to music by Lluís Llach, Guillermina Motta and Ovidi Montllor, among others.

== Main works ==
=== Poetry ===
- Primer llibre de poemes (1914)
- El Mal Caçador (1916)
- Cançons d'abril i de novembre, (1918)
- Cançons de taverna i d'oblit, (1922)
- Cançons de rem i de vela, (1923)
- Cançons de totes les hores, (1925)
- El comte Arnau, (1928), long poem in heroic verse
- La rosa de cristall, (1933)
- Àncores i estrelles, (1936)
- Entre l'equador i els tròpics, (1938)
- El poema de Montserrat, (1950)
- Divina Comèdia, traducción de Dante, (1950)

=== Novels ===
- Paulina Buxareu, (1919)
- All i salobre, (1929)
- Vida privada, (1932) Award winner Joan Crexells

=== Anthologies of newspaper articles ===
- Cafè, copa i puro, (1929)
- L'aperitiu, (1937) o (1946)
- Cola de gallo, (1959), in Spanish
- Memòries, (1954)
- "L'ànima de les coses" (2001)
- "El perfum dels dies" (2004)

=== Theatre ===
- Rondalla d'esparvers (1918)
- L'estudiant i la pubilla (1921)
- El jardinet de l'amor (1922)
- Dijous Sant (1923)
- El foc de les ginesteres (1923)
- Fidelitat (1925)
- La Llúcia i la Ramoneta, (1928), comedy
- Les llàgrimes de l'Angelina, (1928), comedy
- La Rambla de les floristes, (1935)
- Judit, (1929)
- Marçal Prior, (1926)
- La filla del Carmesí, (1929)
- La corona d'espines, (2000)
- L'Hostal de la Glòria, (1931)
- El cafè de la Marina, (1933)
- La Plaça de Sant Joan, (1934)
- Reina, (1935)
- El prestigi dels morts, (1946)
- La fortuna de Sílvia, (1947)
- Galatea, (1948)
- L'hereu i la forastera, (1949)
- Les vinyes del Priorat, (1950)
- L'alcova vermella, (1952)
- La herida luminosa, (1954)
- La paraula de foc, (1955)
- El senyor Perramon, translated from Molière, (1960)
- El fiscal Requesens, translated from Gogol, (1961)

=== Other works ===
- Els ocells amics, (1922)
- "Montserrat" (1960), tourist guide
- Verdaguer, poeta de Catalunya, edition posthumously (1968), literary criticism
