= Lluís Permanyer =

Spanish journalist and essayist (1939–2025)

Lluís Permanyer i Lladós
- Born: 1939; Barcelona, Spain
- Died: 23 October 2025 (aged 86)
- Education: University of Barcelona
- Occupations: Journalist; essayist
- Employer: La Vanguardia
- Notable work: L'Eixample. 150 anys d'història La Barcelona lletja
- Awards: Luca de Tena Award, City of Barcelona Journalism Award, National Journalism Award of Catalonia, Spain’s National Prize for Cultural Journalism

Lluís Permanyer i Lladós (1939 – 23 October 2025) was a Spanish journalist and essayist known for six decades of work at La Vanguardia and for a body of books and audiovisual works on the Barcelona's history, culture and urban fabric.

Lladós received the City of Barcelona Journalism Award in 1987, the Luca de Tena Award in 1969, the National Journalism Award of Catalonia in 2008, and Spain's National Prize for Cultural Journalism in 2022.

== Early life and education ==
Permanyer was born in Barcelona in 1939, a city that later became the principal subject of his journalism and books. He studied law at the University of Barcelona and obtained a professional qualification from the Escuela Oficial de Periodismo before entering newsroom work. As a young reporter, he covered key civic events of the 1960s including the Caputxinada, attending as a correspondent and later recalling the censorship that followed in the press.

== Career ==
Permanyer joined La Vanguardia in 1966, first in the international section and later as a city chronicler focused on Barcelona. He remained associated with the newspaper for the rest of his life, with his final piece published on the day of his death describing the meeting between Joaquim Cabot and Lluís Millet that led to the Palau de la Música Catalana. Beyond print, he contributed regularly to Cadena SER in Catalonia and collaborated with Betevé and TV3. He also presented a series of television documentaries on Barcelona, with eight titles cited across obituaries and agency reports.

During his career, he was known for attentive urban observation and a sustained interest in the history and cultural life of the city. He declined roles that might compromise independence, including a government press post and the honorific of official city chronicler, preferring to write without institutional ties while remaining widely regarded as Barcelona's de facto chronicler.

His work received major awards in Catalonia and Spain, including the state National Prize for Cultural Journalism in 2022, granted by ministerial order and recognizing six decades of cultural reporting across press, radio and television. Earlier honors included the City of Barcelona Journalism Award, the Luca de Tena Award and the National Journalism Award of Catalonia.

== Writing ==
Permanyer's writing combined historical research with accessible narrative to document the making of modern Barcelona through essays, profiles and photo led volumes that mapped its architecture, social life and bourgeois milieu. He authored more than eighty books, including urban biographies of neighbourhoods and arteries such as the Eixample, Passeig de Gràcia and the Diagonal. Representative titles include L’Eixample. 150 anys d’història and La Barcelona lletja, works that pair narrative with historical photography and critique of the city's built environment. He also published volumes and profiles on Catalan artists including Joan Miró and Antoni Tàpies.

Before joining La Vanguardia, he helped popularize the Proust Questionnaire in Spain through a series in the Barcelona weekly Destino, work later collected in book form. His work also comprises television documentaries and regular radio segments.

== Death ==
Permanyer died from a heart attack on 23 October 2025, at the age of 86. No wake or funeral took place because he had chosen to donate his body to science.
