= Arenys de Mar Museum =

Museum in Arenys de Mar, Spain

- Museu d'Arenys de Mar. Museu Marès de la Punta
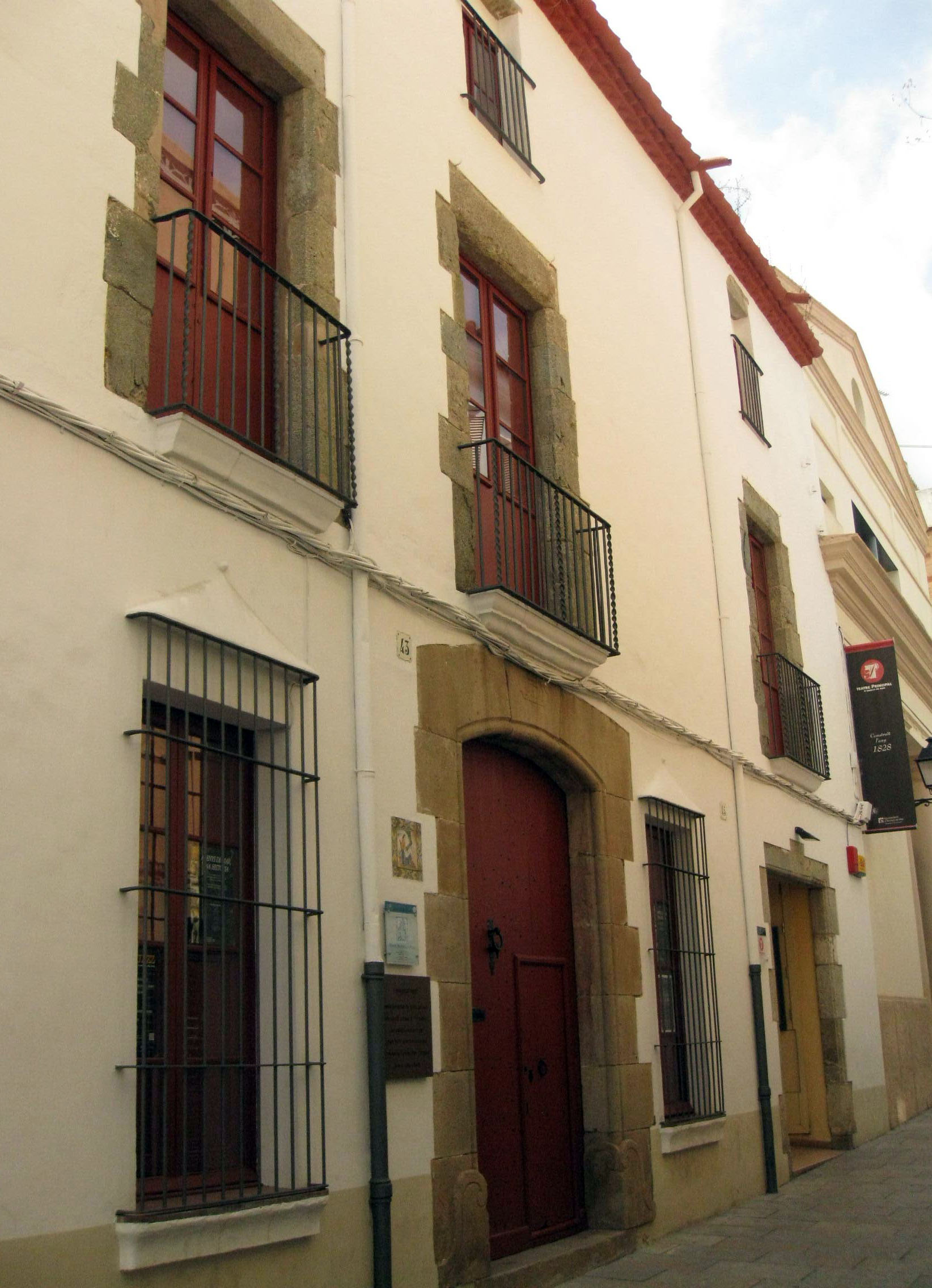
- Location: Arenys de Mar, Spain
- Coordinates: 41°34′55″N 2°32′56″E
- Type: museum
- Website: museu.arenysdemar.cat
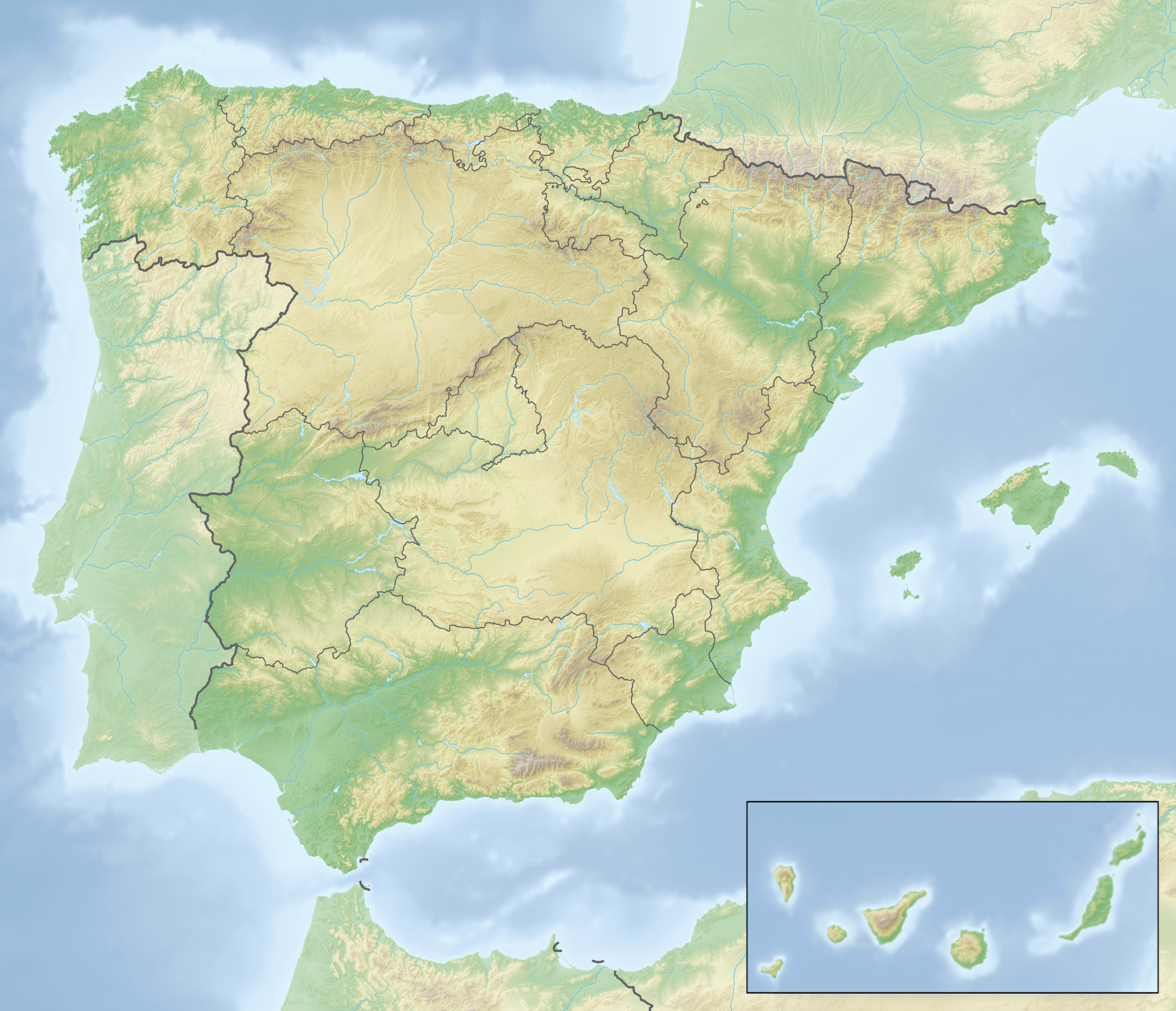
- Location of Arenys de Mar Museum

Arenys de Mar Museum (Catalan: Museu d'Arenys de Mar) is a museum in Arenys de Mar, Catalonia, Spain. It is made up of two different sections: the Marès Lace Museum and the Mollfulleda Mineralogy Museum, and it also conserves and exhibits the collection from the old Arenys de Mar Fidel Fita Municipal Museum.

== Marès Lace Museum ==
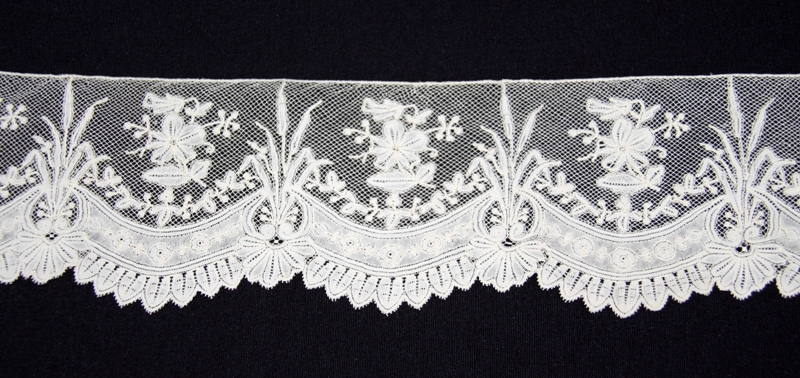
Valenciennes flounce, 19th-century.

The Marès Lace Museum (Catalan: Museu Marès de la Punta) is located in a 17th-century building, the former Hospital de Sant Jaume, which was turned into a museum in 1983 to house the Frederic Marès lace collection. Currently it is a monographic museum, dedicated to lace making, which brings together different collections, such as those of Tórtola Valencia, Vives-Nadal and the Castells collection.

One of the rooms in the Marès Lace Museum exhibits a representative sample from the old Fidel Fita Municipal Museum collection, which includes pieces of diverse origin from throughout the history of Arenys de Mar. This space houses remains from the Torre dels Encantats Iberian settlement and a collection of nautical artefacts.

== Mollfulleda Mineralogy Museum ==
This museum was founded on 9 October 1988 thanks to a donation by Joaquim Mollfulleda i Borrell, who bestowed his mineral collection on the town of Arenys de Mar. It is located in a historic building where, in 1790, Josep Baralt founded the first nautical school in Spain. The Mollfulleda Mineralogy Museum is scientific in nature and houses a valuable collection of minerals from around the world, systematically classified.
