= Club Nàutic d'Arenys de Mar =

Spanish yacht club

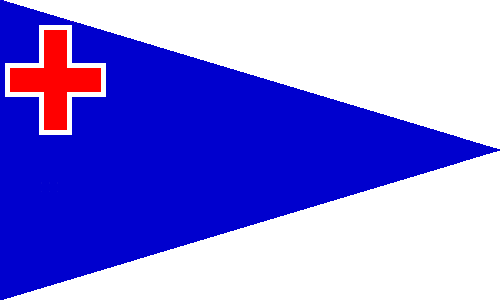
- Burgee
- Short name: CNAM
- Founded: 1952
- Location: Arenys de Mar, Catalonia, Spain
- Website: http://www.cnarenys.com

The Club Nàutic d'Arenys de Mar, also known as CNAM, is a yacht club located in the Villa of Arenys de Mar, in the Maresme region, Barcelona. It was founded in 1952, being the fourth oldest nautical club of Catalonia, and the oldest yacht club in Spain not located in a capital of province.

== Features ==
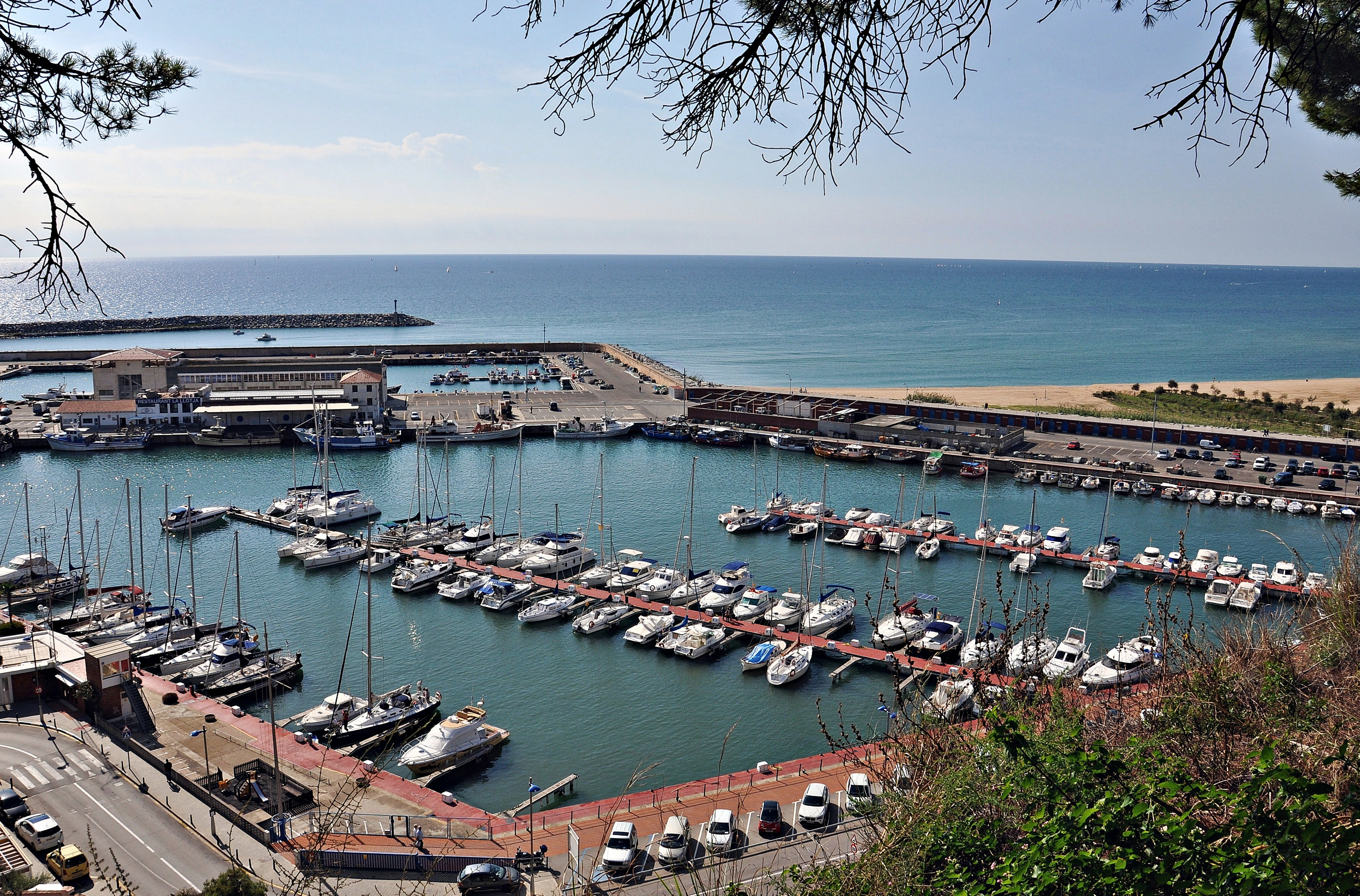
Partial view of the marina of the CNAM

Its facilities are in the Port of Arenys de Mar, where there is a "Sailing School" and a "Sport Improvement Center". Some Spanish Olympic crews have been members of this club.

One of the former presidents of the CNAM was Agustí Montal and Galobart, who was also president of FC Barcelona between 1946 and 1952.

The CNAM periodically organizes championships of Catalonia, Spain and even international ones of different sailing classes, especially in 420, Optimist and Laser. It also organizes national cruise regattas such as the Interclubs Zone Center Championship in February and the RANC Cup (Royal National Cruise Association) in October. CNAM's dinghies and cruising fleets are present in the main sporting events of Catalonia, Spain and Europe.

On April 16, 2021, the Club's Board of Governors agreed to transfer its documentary collection to the Generalitat de Catalunya for conservation in the Maresme Regional Archive. Between April and June, the transport and destruction of the documentation was carried out, which is kept and classified in the facilities of the Maresme Regional Archive. Previously, José María Martínez-Hidalgo, who was a member of several club boards, had donation to the CNAM library of several hundred books from his private library.

== Organized Championships ==
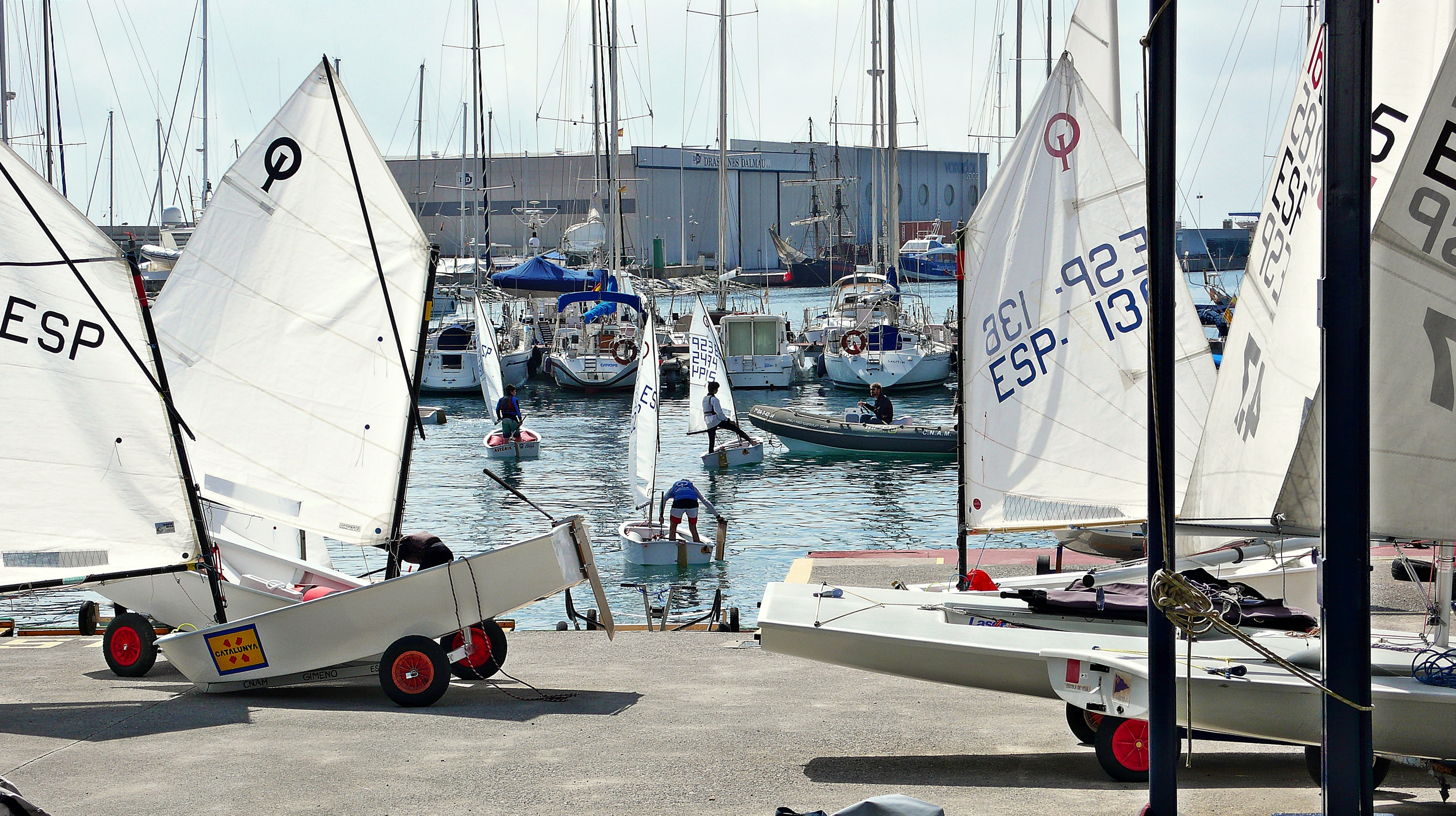
Optimist regatta in CNAM's facilities

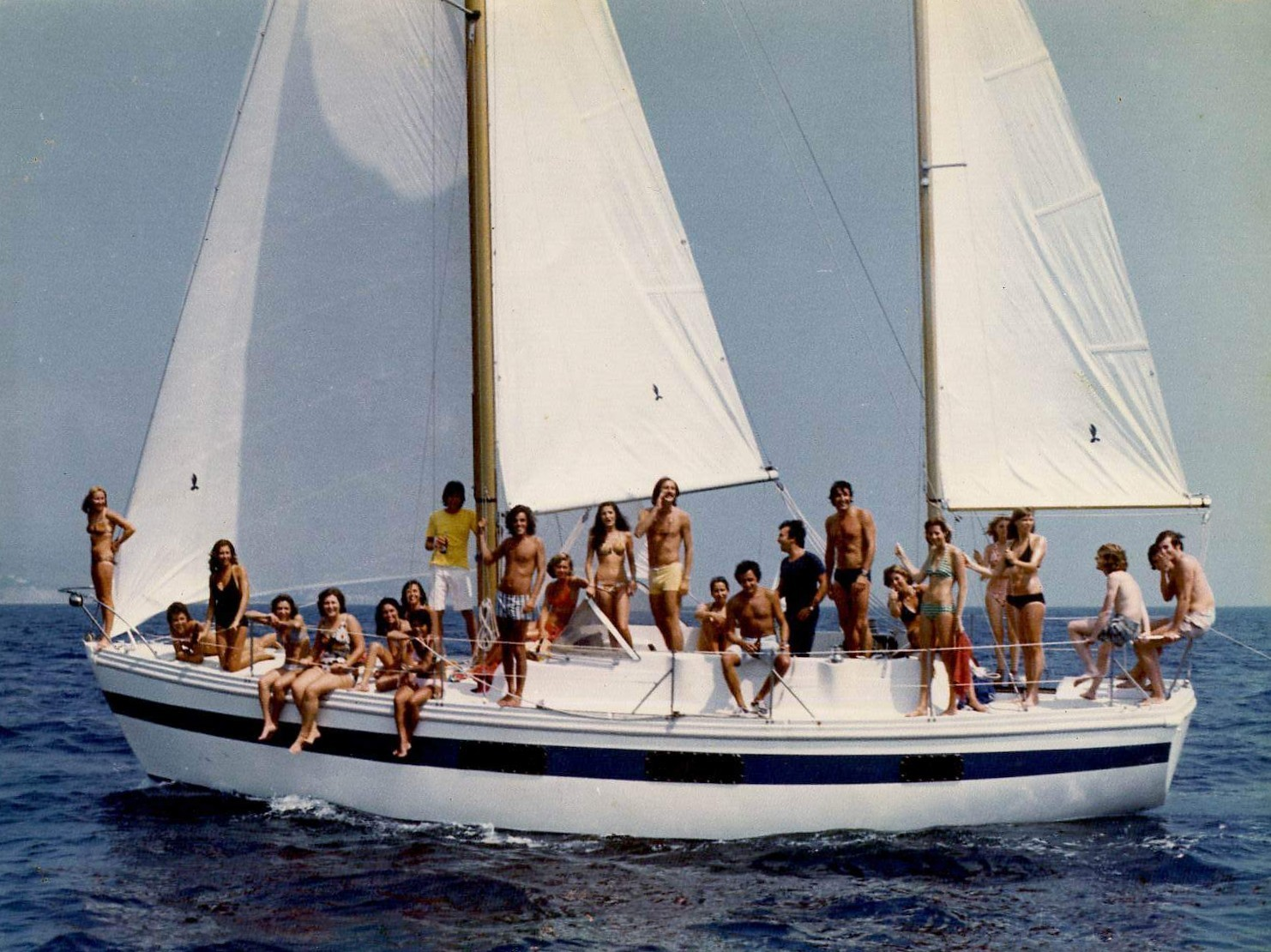
Coronado 35 navigating on "broad reach" with a numerous crew, most of them members of the CNAM

Especially under the presidency of Jacinto Ballester, the CNAM organized sports events of Catalonia, Spain, Europe and World's, among them.

- 1970-1976: Christmas Race (Open international participation)
- 1970: Optimist World's Championship.
- 1970: Spanish Championship "Open" Flying Dutchman class.
- 1970: Flying Dutchman European Championship.
- 1972: Second Ladies European Sailing Championship
- Spanish Championship Dragon class
- Spanish championship Soling class

=== Participating VIPs ===
- Juan Carlos I of Spain
- Cristina of Spain
- Rodney Pattisson

== See also ==
- Maritime Museum of Barcelona
- School of pilots
- Transoceanic Pilot
- José Maria Martínez-Hidalgo

== Bibliography ==
- Ports Of Generalitat
