= Real (galley) =

16th-century Spanish galley

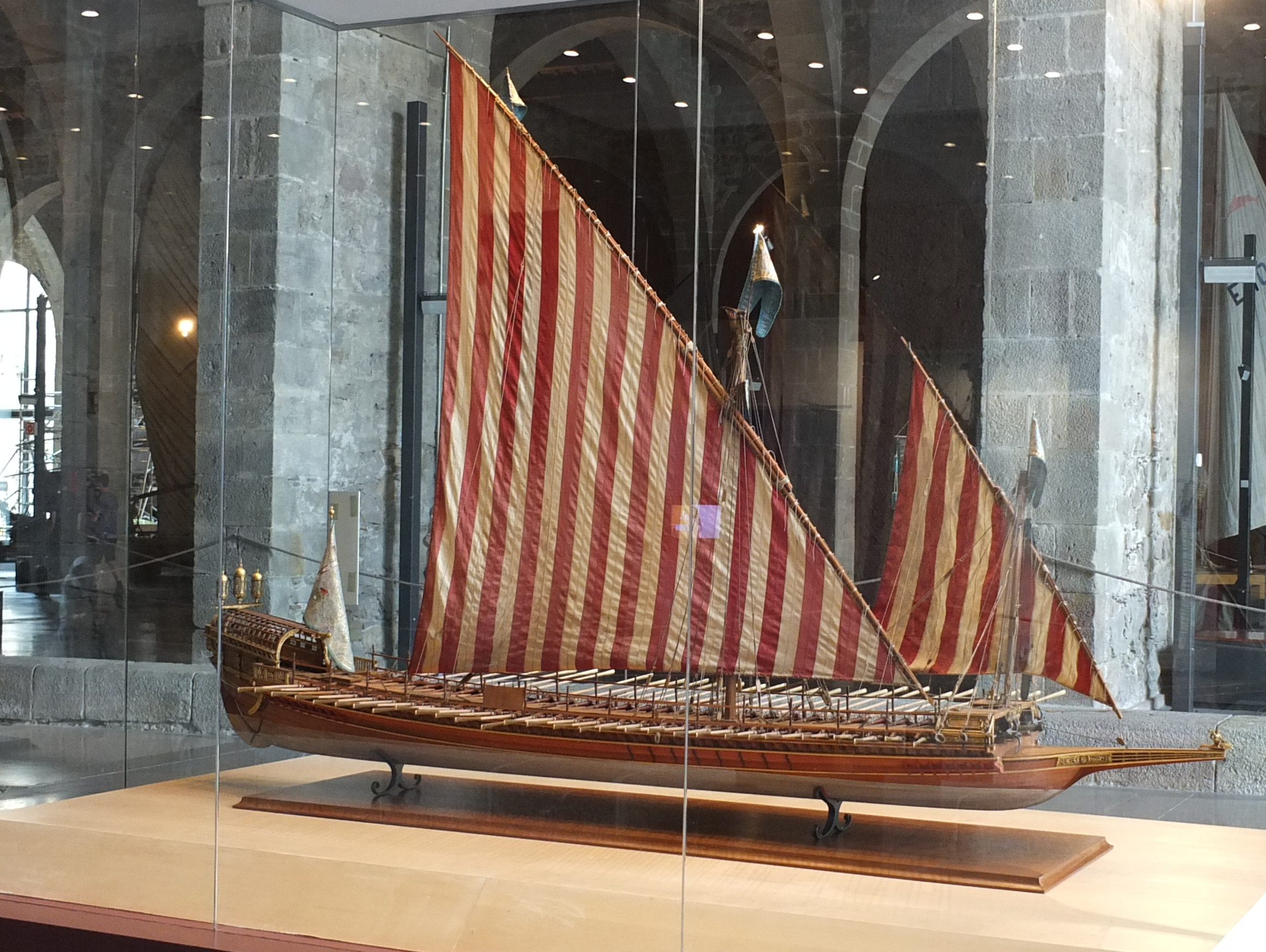
- Scale model in Barcelona Maritime Museum.

History
- Builder: Barcelona Royal Shipyard
- Launched: 1568

General characteristics
- Class & type: Galley
- Length: 60 m (200 ft)
- Beam: 6.2 m (20 ft)

Real (Spanish for "Royal") was a Spanish galley and the flagship of Don John of Austria in the Battle of Lepanto in 1571.

== Construction ==
Real was built in Barcelona at the Royal Shipyard in 1568 and was the largest galley of its time. Real was usually the designation of the flagship in a particular Spanish fleet and was not necessarily the actual name of the ship. Almirante ("admiral") was the designation of the ship of the 2nd in command, and others with a specific command function were patrona/padrona and lanterna.

The galley was 60 metres (200 ft) long and 6.2 metres (20 ft) wide, had two masts and weighed 237 tons empty. It was equipped with three heavy and six light artillery pieces, was propelled by a total of 290 rowers, and, in addition, carried some 400 sailors and soldiers at Lepanto. 50 men were posted on the upper deck of the forecastle, 50 on the midship ramp, another 50 each along the sides at the bow, 50 each on the skiff and oven platforms, 50 on the firing steps along the sides near the stern, and 50 more on the stern platform behind the huge battle flag. To help move and maneuver the huge ship, it was pushed from the rear during the battle by two other galleys.

=== Decoration ===
Befitting a royal flagship to be shown before Spain's former rivals of Venice and the Papacy, it was luxuriously ornamented and painted in the red and gold colors of Spain. Its poop was elaborately carved and painted with numerous sculptures, bas-reliefs, paintings, and other embellishments, most of them evoking religious and humanistic inspirational themes. Giovanni Battista Castello il Bergamasco did the first sketch for the decoration under the orders of Francisco Hurtado de Mendoza, Count of Monteagudo. After his death in 1569, the humanist Juan de Mal de Lara developed the program. In Seville, the decoration was performed by the sculptor Juan Bautista Vázquez and the architect Benvenuto Tortello. Mal de Lara's program featured Hercules, Betis (the personification of the river Guadalquivir), Jason and the Argonauts, personifications of virtues, and other mythological allegories alluding to and advising John of Austria as captain for his half-brother Philip II of Spain.

== Naval service ==
The Battle of Lepanto in 1571 saw Juan of Austria's fleet of the Holy League, an alliance of Christian powers of the Mediterranean, decisively defeat an Ottoman fleet under Grand Admiral (Kaptan-ı Derya) Müezzinzade Ali Pasha.

Real and the Turkish galley Sultana, Ali Pasha's flagship, engaged in direct deck-to-deck combat very soon after the start of the battle. Sultana was boarded and after about one hour of bloody fighting, with reinforcements being supplied to both ships by supporting galleys of the two respective fleets, captured. Ali Pasha was wounded by musket fire, fell to the deck, and was beheaded by a Spanish soldier. His head was displayed on a pike, severely affecting the morale of his troops. Real captured the "Great Flag of the Caliphs" and became a symbol of the victory at Lepanto.

== Legacy ==
In 1971, to commemorate the 400th anniversary of the battle, a replica of La Real was built under the direction of José María Martínez-Hidalgo y Terán and displayed in the Barcelona Maritime Museum where it can be viewed today.

== Gallery ==
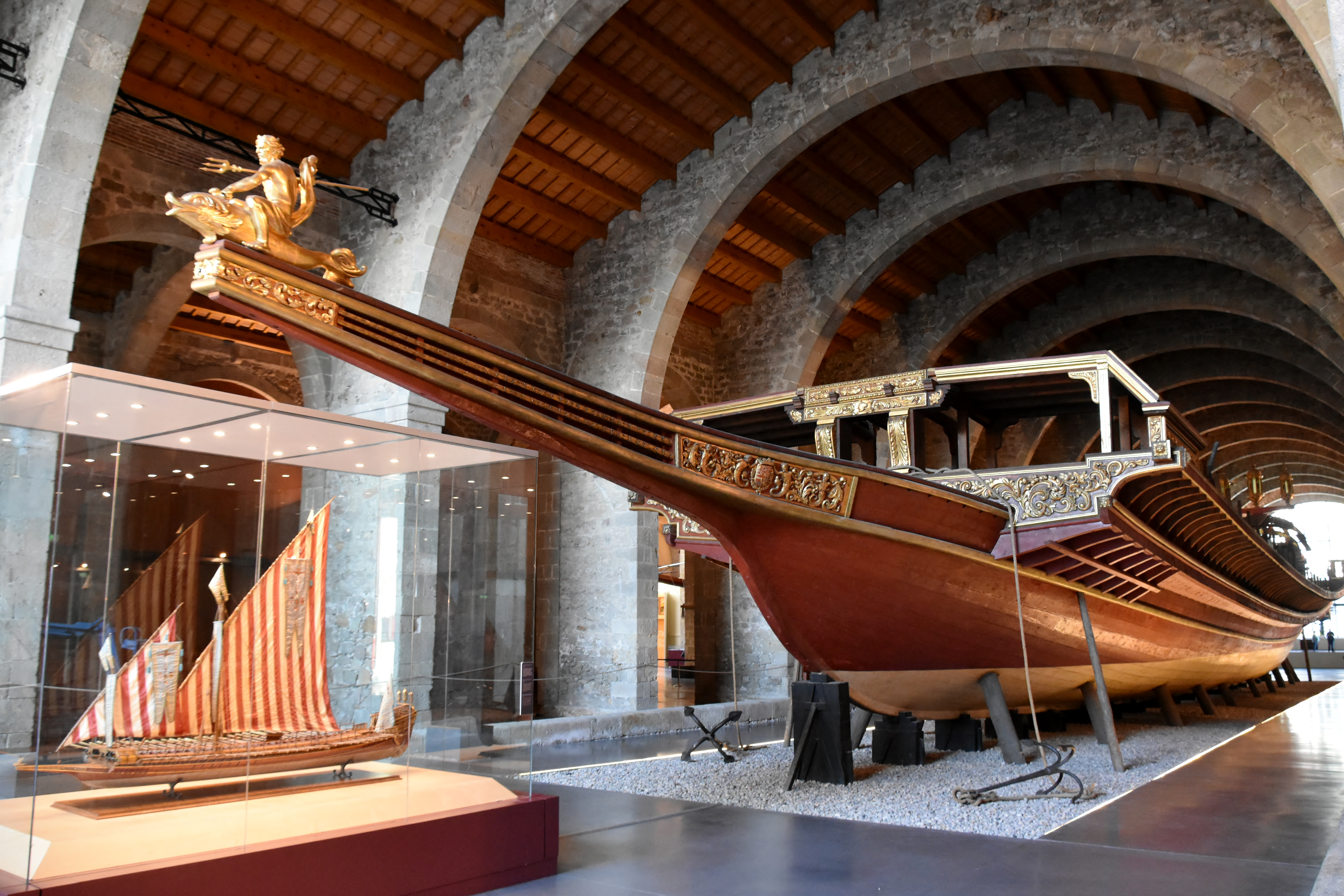
Bow view of the replica in the Museu Marítim de Barcelona.

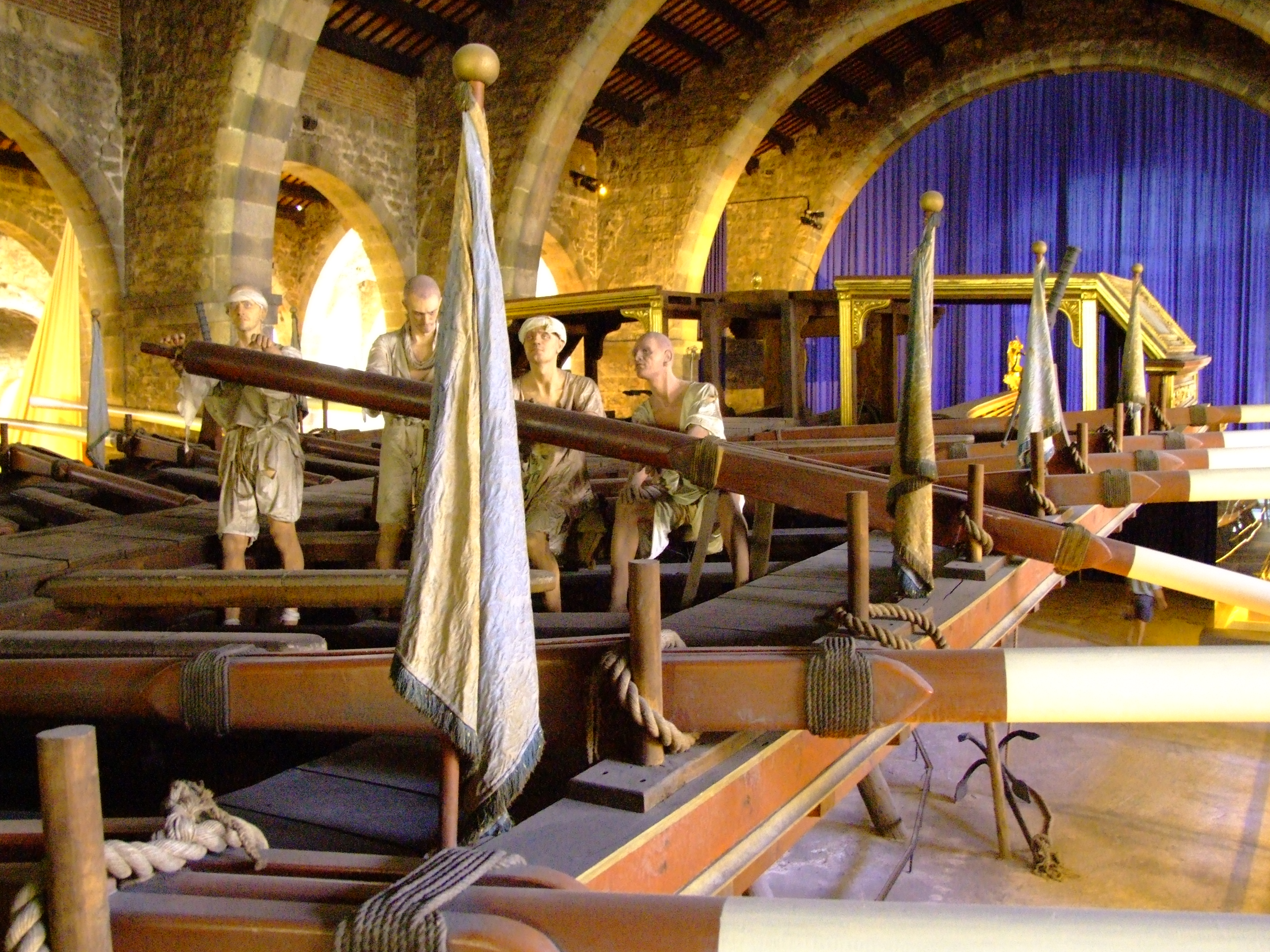
Rowing deck.

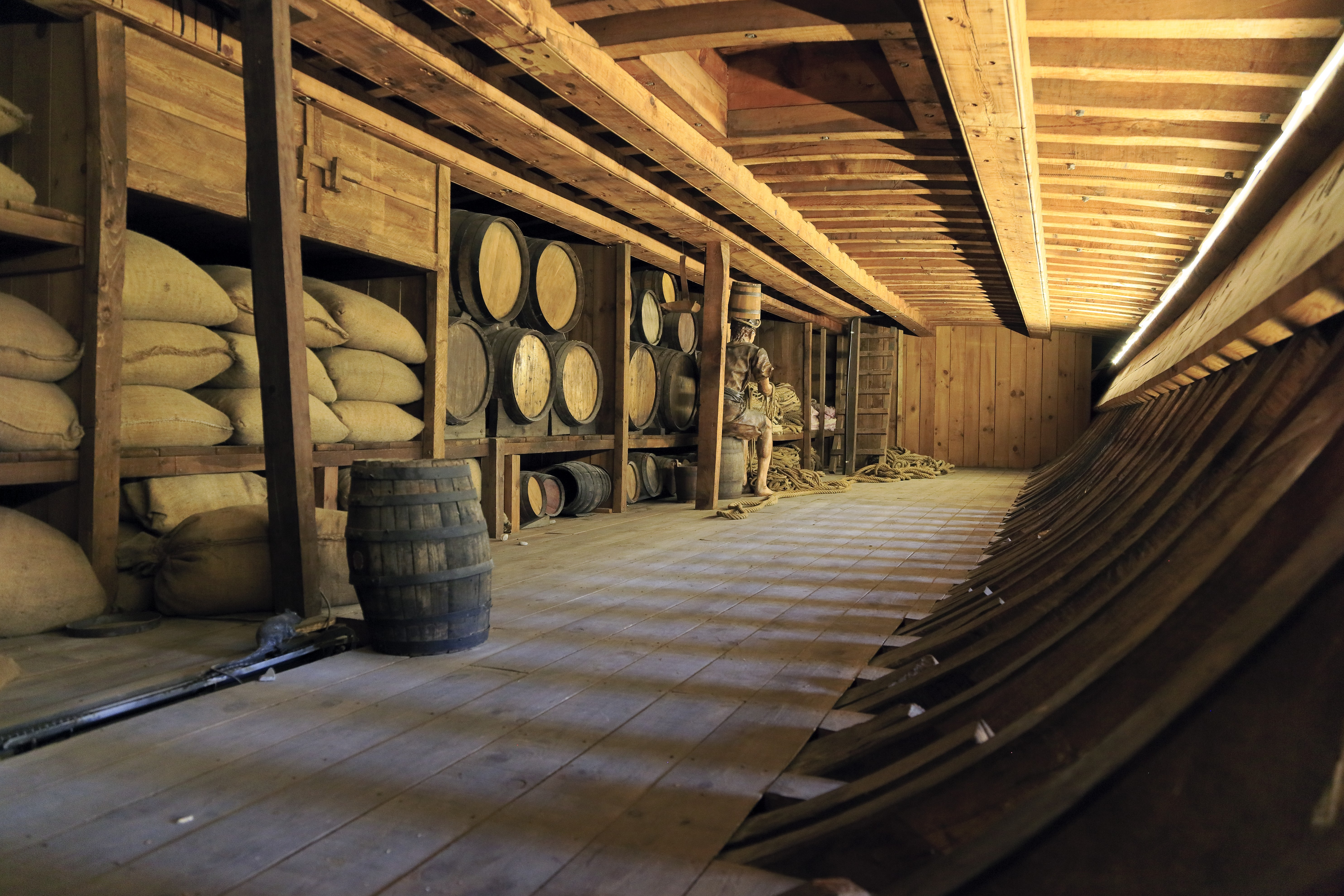
View of the hold.

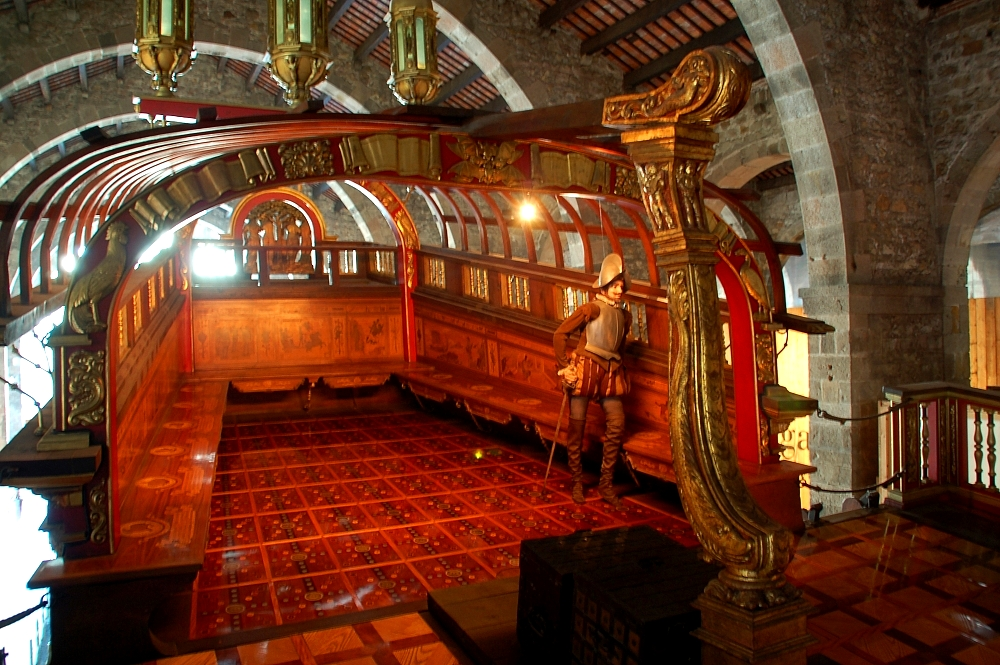
The stern chamber.

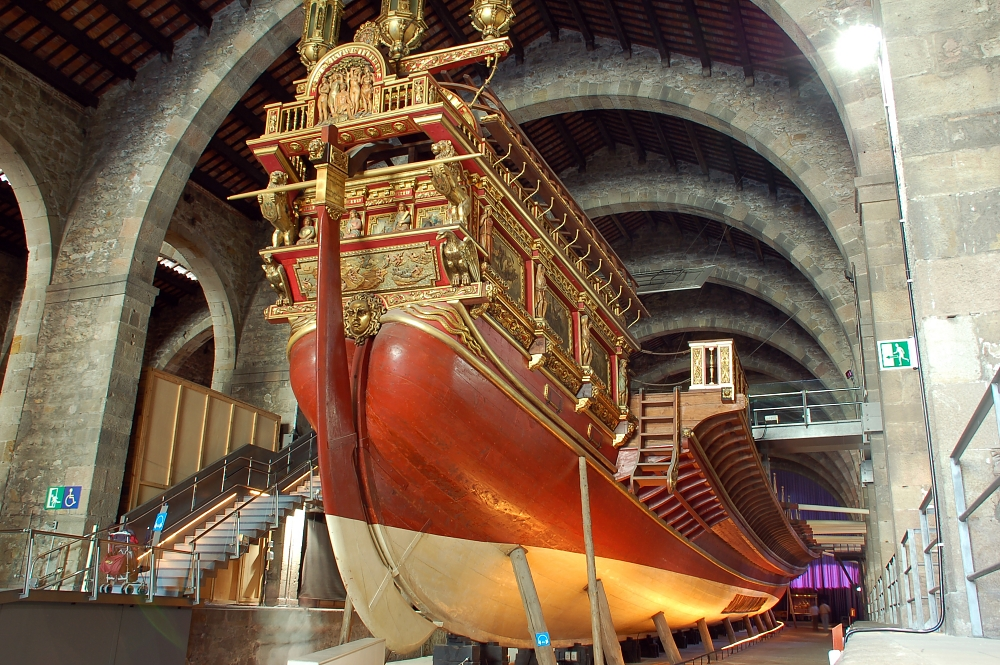
Stern view.

== See also ==
- Media related to Real (ship, 1568) at Wikimedia Commons
