= Felucca Plutón =

Boat

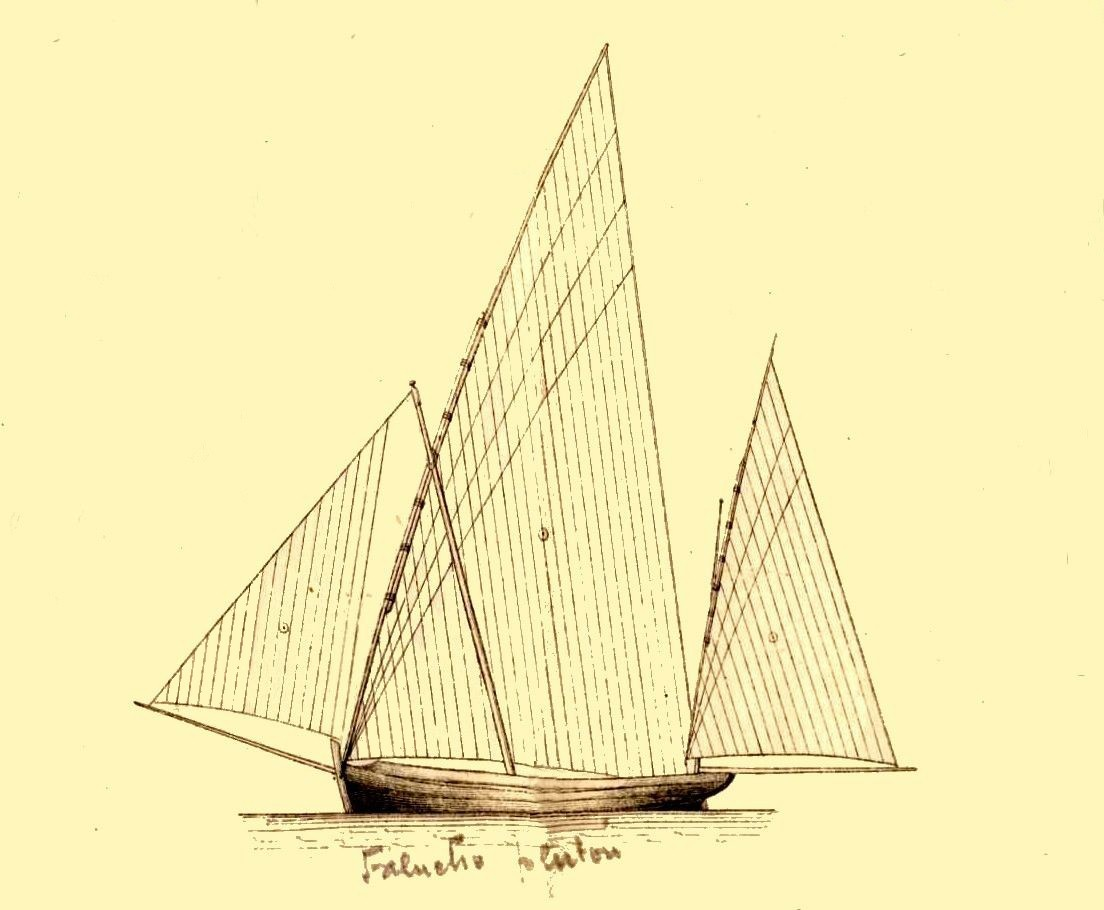
- Felucca Plutón

History

Spain
- Name: Plutón
- Owner: Ors y García
- Ordered: 1835
- Builder: Arenys de Mar ship yard (Spain)

The Felucca Plutón was a very notable boat for its performance. Built in Arenys de Mar, she was of the type "elastic felucca".

She used to navigate as a coast guard ("maritime guard") based in Benidorm.

== Nautical features ==
The performances of the Plutón, from a nautical point of view, were highlighted by Lieutenant Pedro Riudavets. This expert Menorcan navigator translated a treatise on sail construction (Sails and Sailmaking by Robert Kipping), adding many aspects about lateen sails that were not included in the original: Elements of sail construction.

Regarding the Plutón, Riudavets stated that it was one of the best feluccas built on the Catalan coast; He even indicated the proportions of the hull and rig that allowed such outstanding results. Basically good speed and great upwind ability (close-hauled angle: 4.5 quarters). Riudavets' dedication and interest in "maritime safety" vessels seems demonstrated by his donation of three models to the Naval Museum.

== Dimensions ==
The dimensions indicated in the table are based on the dimensions that appear in the reference work, originally published in Burgos feet (1 Burgos foot = 0.278635 m). The importance of this unit of measurement in shipbuilding lies in the big amount of official documents about ships using the unit.

| Measurements | Burgos feet | Meters |
|---|---|---|
| Length | 78 | 21.06 |
| Width | 23.5 | 6,345 |
| Strut | 7.4 | 1,998 |
| Main mast | 79 | 21.33 |
| Mizzenmast | 55 | 14.85 |
| Boom | 53.04 | 14.32 |
| Mizzen-sheet-puller | 42.9 | 11.58 |
| Main lateen yard | 132.6 | 35.80 |
| Mizzen lateen yard | 71.6 | 19.33 |
| Main yard lower end | 74.88 | 20.22 |
| Main yard upper piece | 105.30 | 28.43 |
| Mainmast draft below deck | 8 | 2.16 |
| Mizzen mast draft | 6 | 1.62 |
| Distance of the mainmast forward of center | 2 | 0.54 |
| Distance of mizzenmast aft of center | 3.4 | 9.19 |
| Inside the bowsprit | 10 | 2.7 |
| Interior of the coaster | 6 | 1.62 |
| Angle of the mainmast with the vertical | 18° | |
| Mizzen mast angle aft | 5° | |
| Angle of the boom with the horizontal | 15° | |

== Professional tasks ==
The handling of the Plutón as a customs ship was carried out by a company from Benidorm, Ors y García, founded in 1835 under the orders of Gaspar Ortuño. In 1844 the Plutón belonged to the Spanish Navy.

== Types of feluccas ==
In the 19th and 20th centuries there were two types of feluccas: utilitarian feluccas (intended for ordinary transport) and fast feluccas called elastics (intended for coast guard functions, privateering, smuggling and important transport). The elastic feluccas had finer lines, greater sail area and more slender sail shapes. The following images show two felucca-rigged boats still underway. Regarding the shapes and rigging, they could be considered utilitarian feluccas. Plutón was 21 meters long.

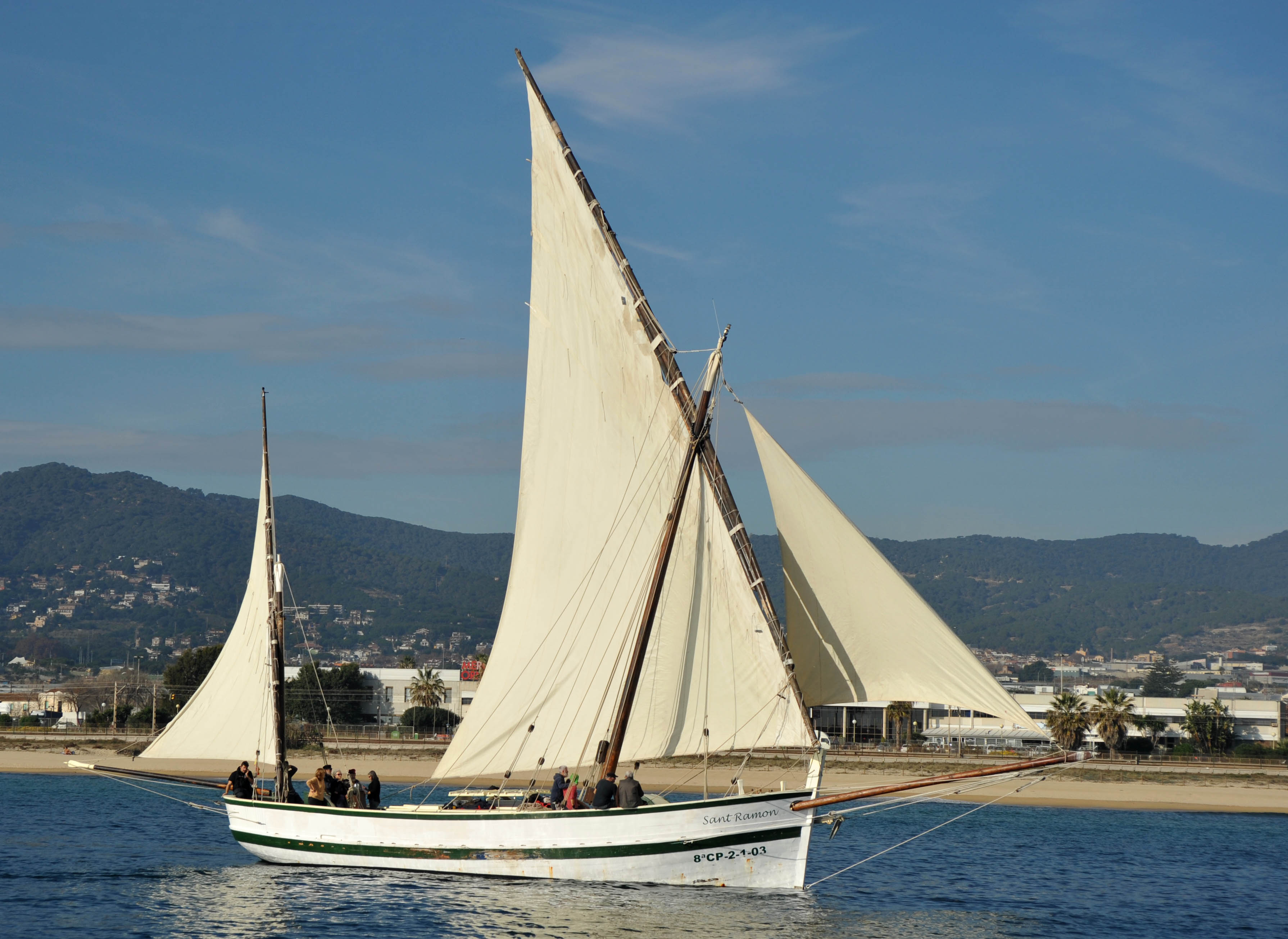
Felucca Sant Ramon. Length 15.50 m.

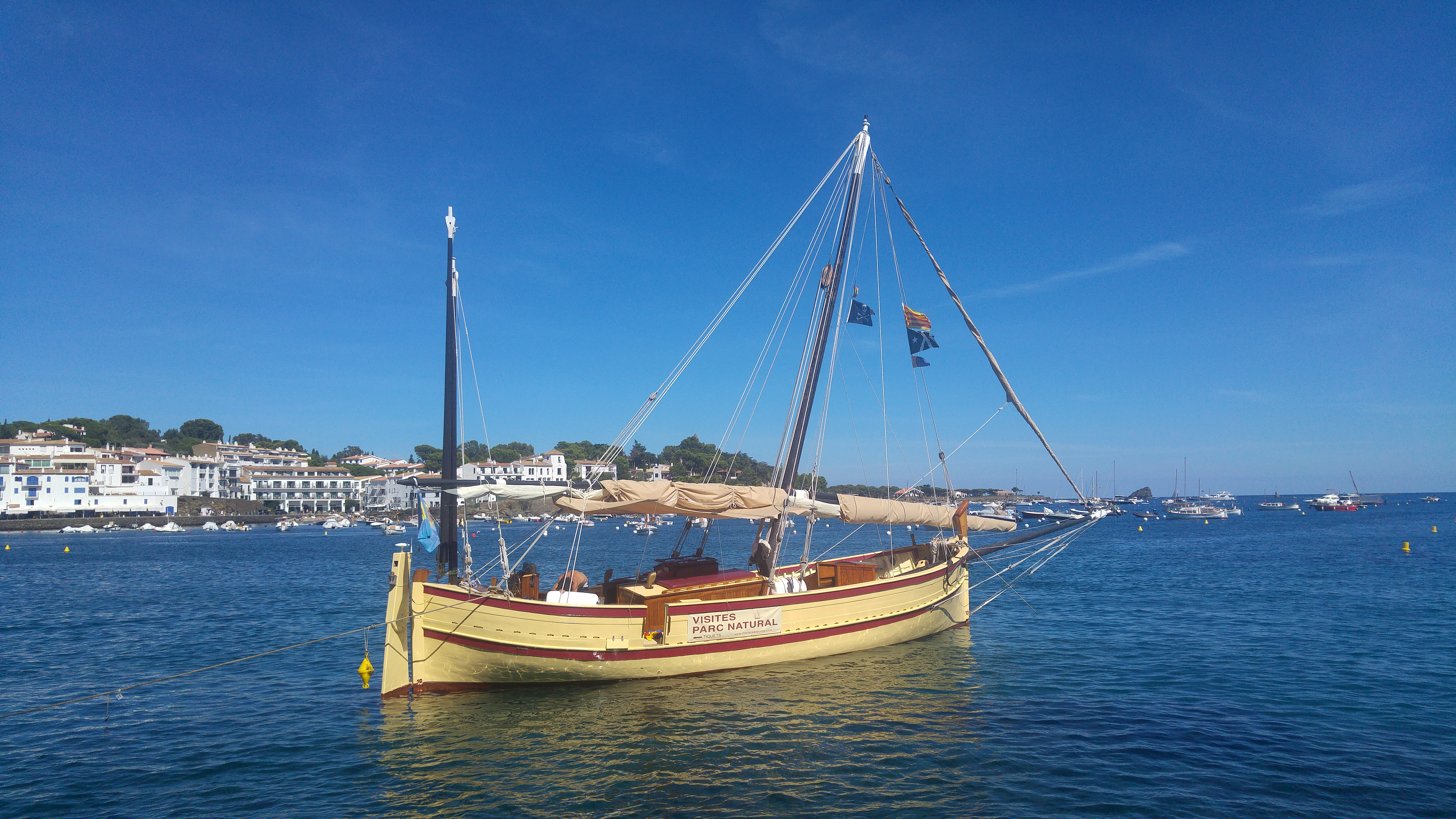
Felucca Sant Isidre. Length 14.65 m.
