= Jaume Mora =

Spanish physician and researcher

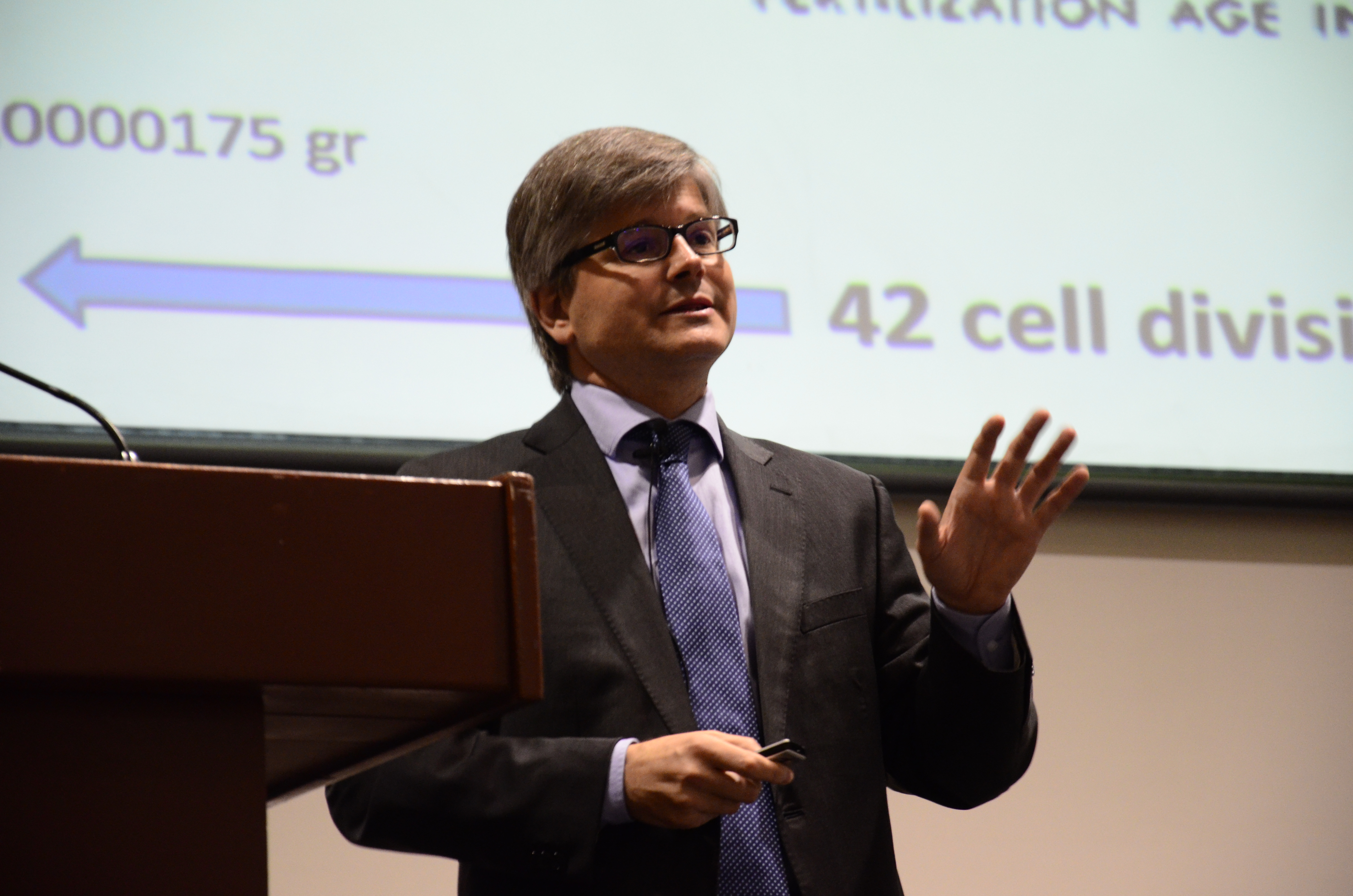
- Born: Arenys de Mar, Barcelona, Spain
- Education: University of Barcelona, Autonomous University of Barcelona, Memorial Sloan-Kettering Cancer Center,
- Known for: cancer Completed sequencing of the Ewing's sarcoma, Neuroblastoma, Glioma, Atypical teratoid rhabdoid tumor
- Scientific career
- Fields: Childhood cancer biology
- Workplaces: Hospital Sant Joan de Déu Barcelona
- Thesis: Molecular genetics of neuroblastoma and the implications for clinical management : towards a biological classification of neuroblastoma tumors (2003)
- Website: Official website

Jaume Mora is a Spanish physician and researcher specialized in pediatric cancer.

== Biography ==
Mora practiced gymnastics in his childhood and youth. He currently lives in Catalonia.

== Career ==
He first studied medicine at the University of Barcelona, where he studied from 1984 to 1990. In 1991 he joined the "Hospital General de Granollers" and in 1992 he joined the "Hospital Universitario Valle de Hebrón", where he became a pediatrician. In 1995 he joined the Medicine School in the Autonomous University of Barcelona, in order to obtain his PhD in 2003. As part of his training, in 1996 he joined the Cornell University Hospital where he specialized in pediatric cancer at the Memorial Sloan Kettering Cancer Center.

Mora is currently Director of the Research Laboratory of Tumor Development and Chief of Pediatric Oncology in the Hospital Sant Joan de Déu Barcelona .

== Medical Perspective ==
For Mora, pediatric oncology's treatments require a constant awareness accompanied by a certain degree of firmness. He has mentioned, repeatedly, that he does not feel gratified with the treatment's result but the process and personalized therapy of each patient. The work and research that he has developed concerning the feasible treatments for cancer have shown that his medical perspective relating to the responsibility of the patient's family, the oncologist and the patient himself have been influenced by commitment, generosity and family strength.

The way he conceives the disease differs from other medical perspectives. For J. Mora, Childhood cancer is better referred to as Developmental cancer. Under this 'Developmental cancer' concept, he refers to an age factor, broadened to include patients up to 25 years old, and also refers to the point in a given patient's development when the cancer might appear. He has established that childhood cancer is a misnomer and that it must be replaced by “Developmental cancer”. For Mora, Developmental cancer is a type of disease that has nothing to do with cancer in adults; he mentions that it is a mistake to compare them because childhood tumors are due to developmental growth only and have nothing to do with external agents.

== Medical Contributions ==
Mora coordinates a group of specialists who research developmental cancer. They have generated the complete sequencing of the Ewing's sarcoma’s genome. In the neuroblastoma, they have gained the ability to predict the tumor’s behavior, and have developed an active plan that will allow the patient a specific therapy. Similarly, they are the first group of researchers to design an animal model of a tumor in the brain stem and have developed a passive treatment without radiation therapy, which can cure gliomas from the spinal cord. In the summer of 2014 they managed to operate a previously inoperable tumor because of its location. The operation was complemented with Mora’s technology and his team printed a tumor model using a 3D printer, allowing them to practice until they were ready to operate on the patient.

== Personal Success ==
Mora establishes that his group of researchers’ success is due to the relationship between the 'laboratory-family', who are still involved with the institution even after the patient's treatment has finished, as that encourages group work and personal passion towards work. Mora mentions that the “laboratory cannot be far away from the patient”, and to ensure a relationship influenced by trust and support as the respective treatments are carried out because at the end of the therapies, all the support received by the patient's family is reflected in financial contributions that enable further research.

== Conferences ==
Conferences’ selection:

- Invited to the Annual Conference of the Catalan Pediatric Society in Reus, Spain, in 2000.
- Invited to the Conference of progress in the investigation of neuroblastoma in Philadelphia in 2000.
- Invited to the Seminario de investigación of the Hospital Vall d’Hebron, about the origins of neuroblastic tumors, in 2004.
- Invited to the Conferencia del Centro de Investigaciones del Cancer, CSIC Salamanca in 2005.
- Invited to the 5º Symposium Internacional de Sarcomas, about round cell sarcomas of childhood in 2007.
- Sarcomas’ Advanced course: Diagnosis, treatment and current research by the Parador Nacional de Alcalá de Henares, in 2009.

== Awards ==
1. In 2000 ASCO honored him with the recognition young investigator (YIA)
2. In 2001 ASCO gave him the Career Development Award (CDA)
3. In 2001 he was awarded with the 16th Schweisguth Prize of the International Society of Pediatric Oncology. (SIOP)
4. In 2006 the Asociación española en contra del cáncer, gave him the scholarship / award Children First
5. In 2009 he was awarded with FERO award
6. In 2011 the BBVA foundation gave him the annual scholarship.

== Affiliation ==
Mora is a member of many committees, including:

- Member of the Spanish and Catalan society of Pediatrics
- Member of the American Society of Cancer Research (AACR)
- Member of the American Society of Clinical Oncology (ASCO)
- Member of the International Society of Pediatric Oncology (SIOP)
- Member of the Sociedad española de oncología pediátrica (SEHOP)
