= Arenys de Mar =

- Municipality
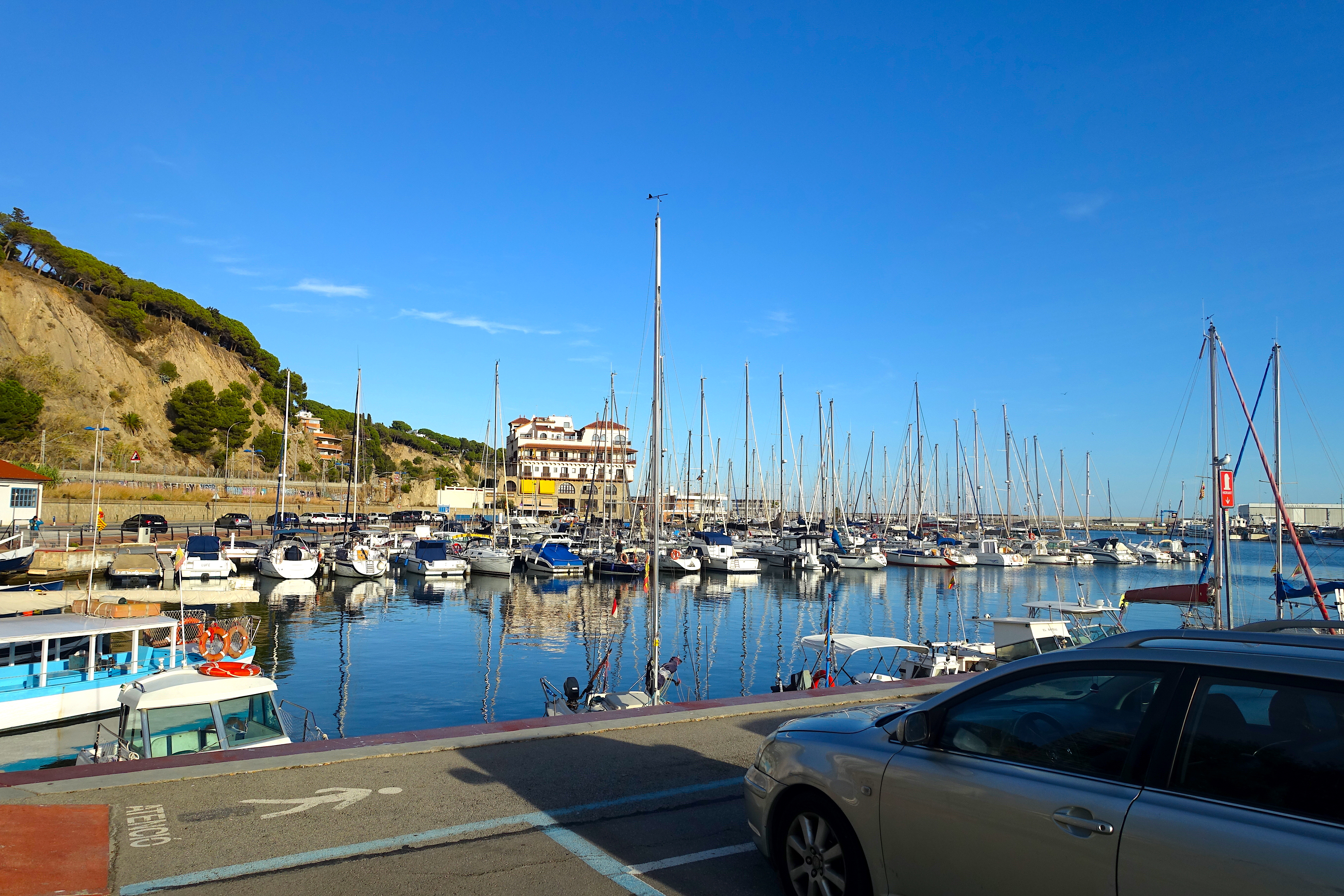

- Flag Coat of arms

- Location in Catalonia Arenys de Mar (Spain)
- Coordinates: 41°34′55″N 2°33′1″E
- Country: Spain
- Community: Catalonia
- Province: Barcelona
- Comarca: Maresme

Government
  - Mayor: Annabel Moreno (ERC)

Area
  - Total: 6.8 km^{2} (2.6 sq mi)
- Elevation: 10 m (33 ft)

Population (2025-01-01)
  - Total: 17,042
  - Density: 2,500/km^{2} (6,500/sq mi)
- Demonyms: Arenyenc, arenyenca
- Postal code: 08350
- Website: arenysdemar.cat

Arenys de Mar (Catalan: [əˈɾɛɲz ðə ˈmaɾ], locally [əˈɾɛɲʒ ðə ˈmaɾ]; arenys being Catalan for "sands (of a seasonal creek)", and de mar for "by the sea" as opposed to Arenys de Munt, "sands up hill") is one of the main municipalities of the comarca of Maresme, Barcelona Province, Catalonia, Spain. It is situated on the coast between Caldes d'Estrac and Canet de Mar, about 40 kilometres (25 miles) northeast of Barcelona. As of 2022, it had a population of 16,155.

Arenys' harbour was for many years the only existing port on the north coast of Barcelona. The beaches, framed by hills which run right down to the sea, give a view of the neighbouring Costa Brava.

== Main sights ==
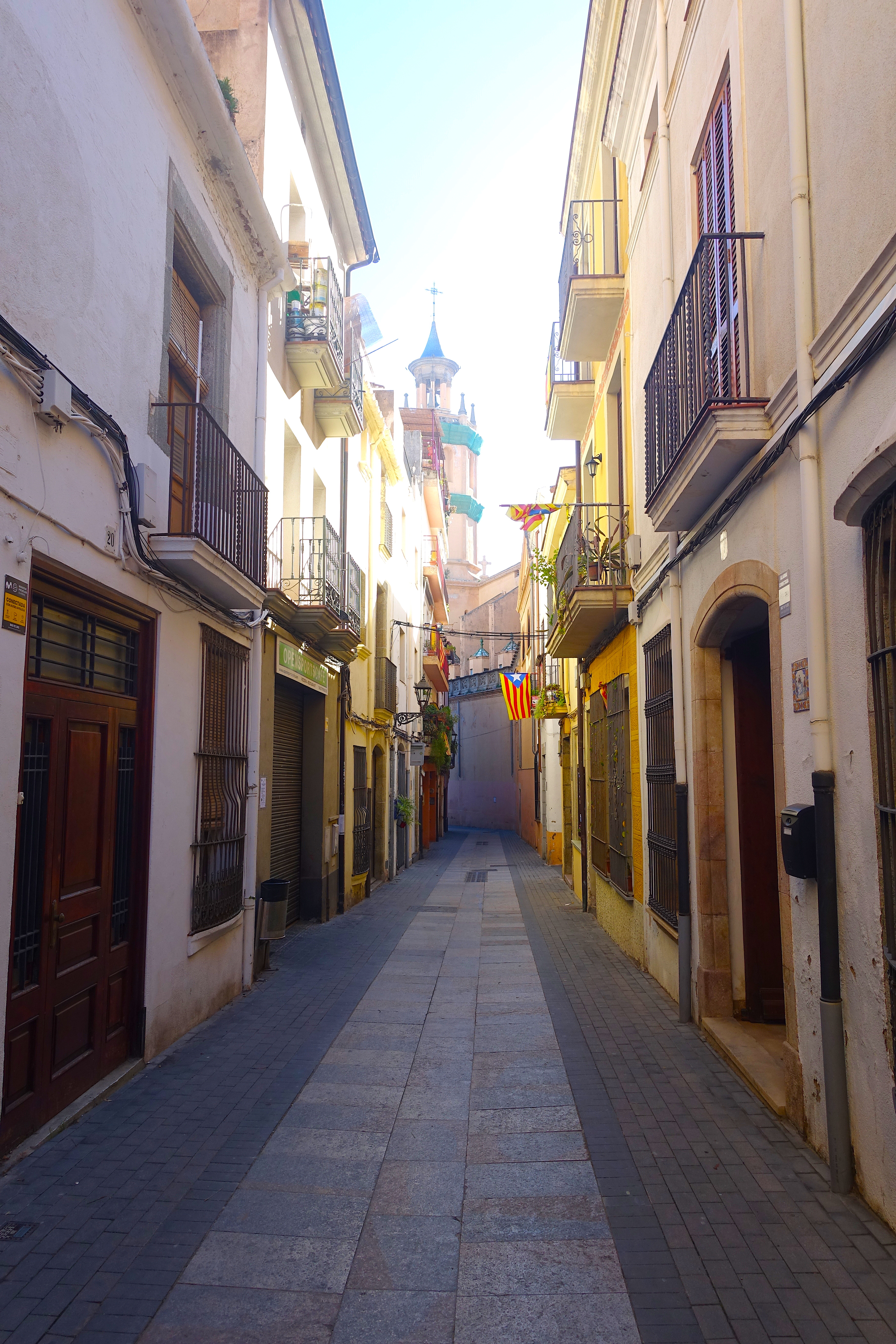
Street around Arenys de Mar

The beaches at Arenys are large, and are formed of coarse-grained sand (Platja del Cabaió).

Sights include the parish church of Santa Maria, with a Baroque reredo, built in 1704 by the sculptor Pau Costa. Along Church Street are the Marés Museum of Lace-making and the Mollfulleda Museum of Mineralogy, forming the Arenys de Mar Museum. Some of the defense towers, built to protect against pirates, are still conserved.

Arenys cemetery, known as Cementiri de Sinera, is a characteristic example of Mediterranean marine cemeteries. It is oriented westward, on top of the Turó de la Pietat.

== Economy and culture ==
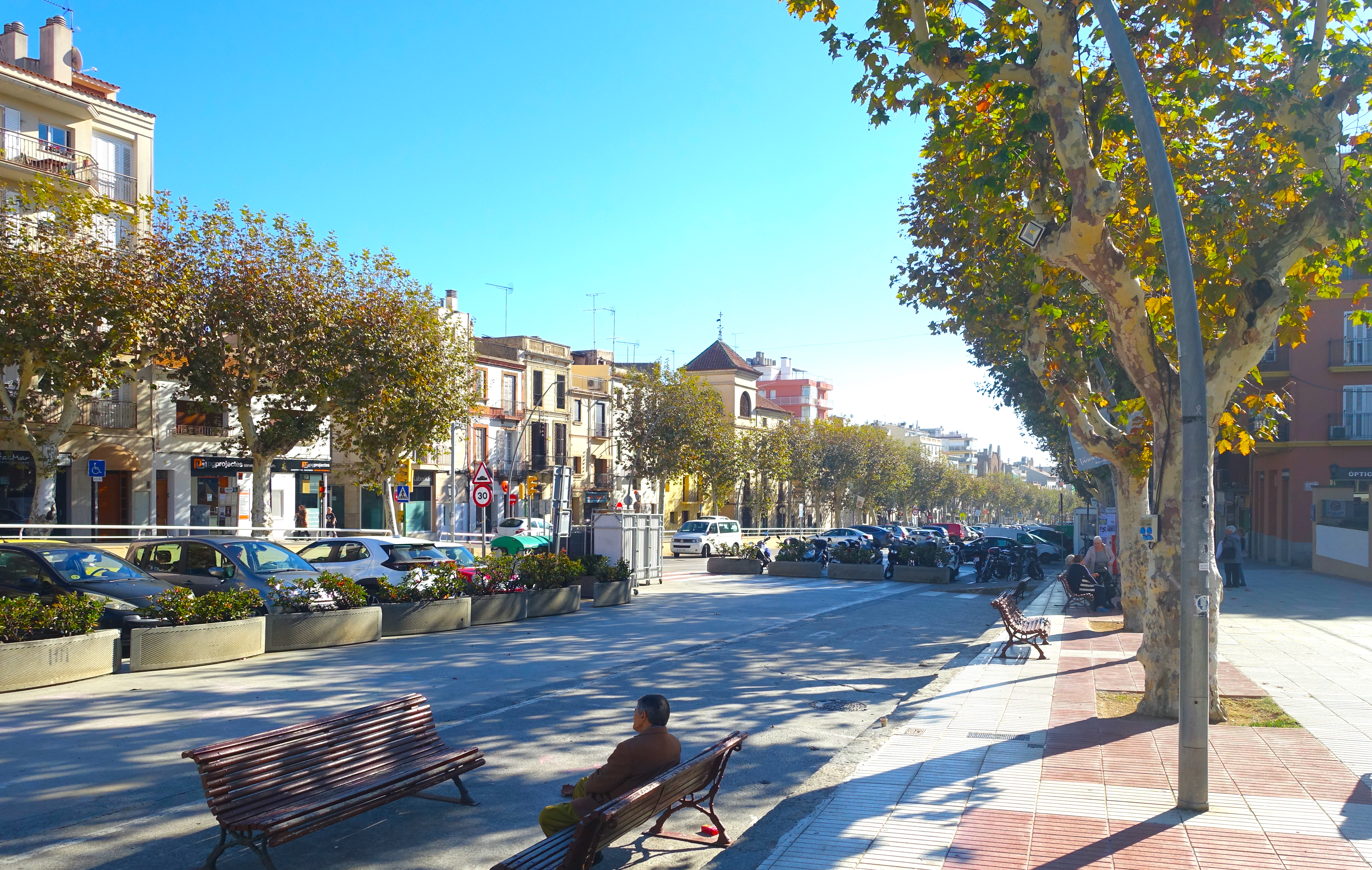
Riera d'Arenys

Arenys is the capital of the county district. Fishing and related industries are the principal economic activity of the town. Two industrial zones are being developed under public and private promotion. Agriculture has declined, but the cultivation of fruits and vegetables is still thriving.

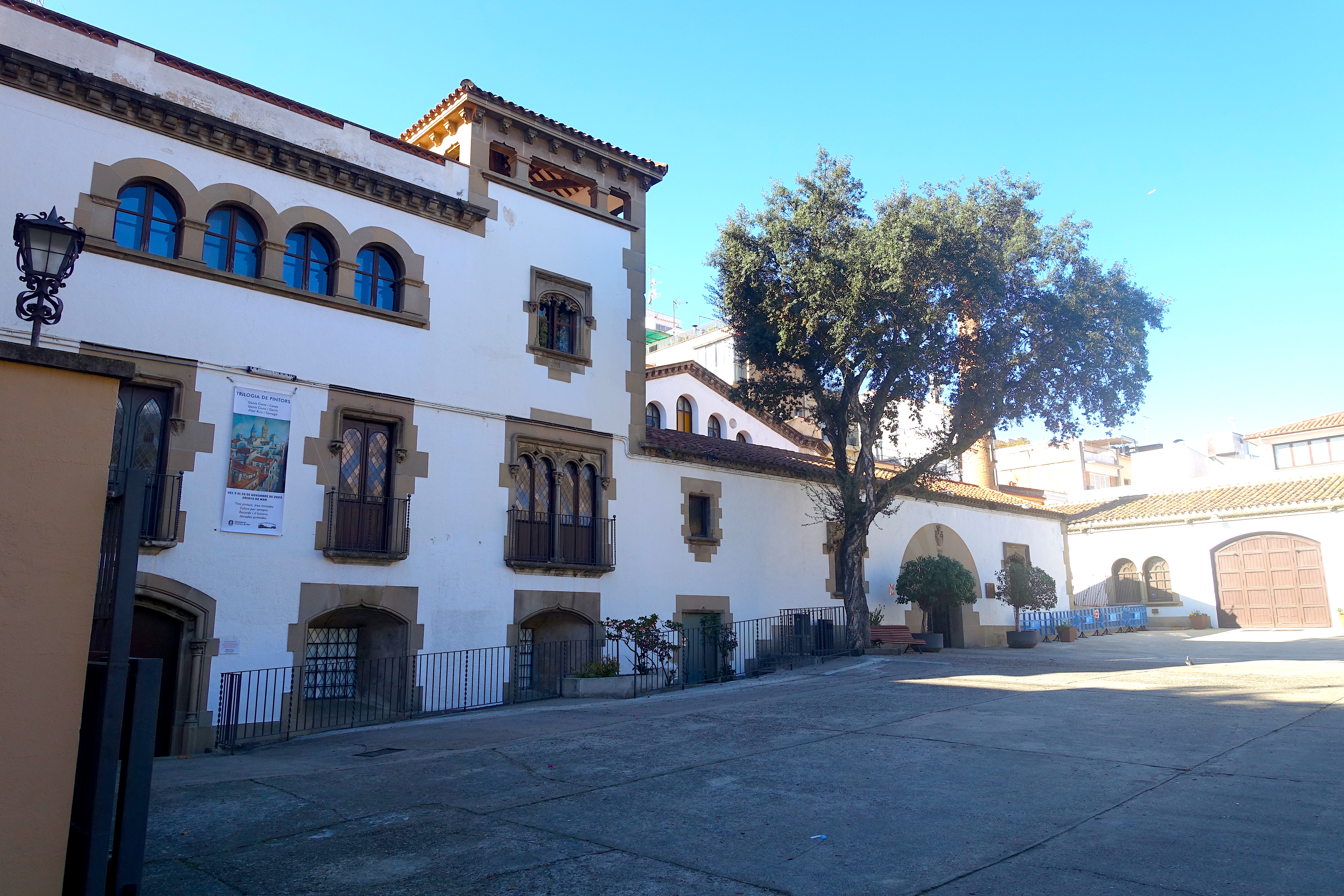
Calisay Arenys de Mar

The fishing and the various related industries which have grown around the harbour comprise a considerable part of the economic activity of the town. The harbour is the most important one in the Maresme and has practically the whole fishing fleet of the region. A fish auction takes place every afternoon when the boats return. There is ample space in the port reserved for yachts. During the summer, many sailing boats anchor here on their Mediterranean journey. The shipyard is still an important local industry.

The Riera (the dry uncovered river bed) is the commercial centre and the hub of all local activities. The market, an Art Nouveau building, remains open every morning as well as Friday afternoons. Inside, it is bustling with people and constant activity. On Saturday mornings, the commercial hustle takes itself to the Riera in the form of a weekly street market. Two village festivals are held in honour of Saint Zenon (9 July) and Saint Roc (16 August), and a big fair is celebrated on Saint Joan's Day (24 June).

Arenys de Mar possesses a grammar school, an agricultural school for chicken farming, a school of music and various schools where the old craft of lace-making is taught.

== Transport ==
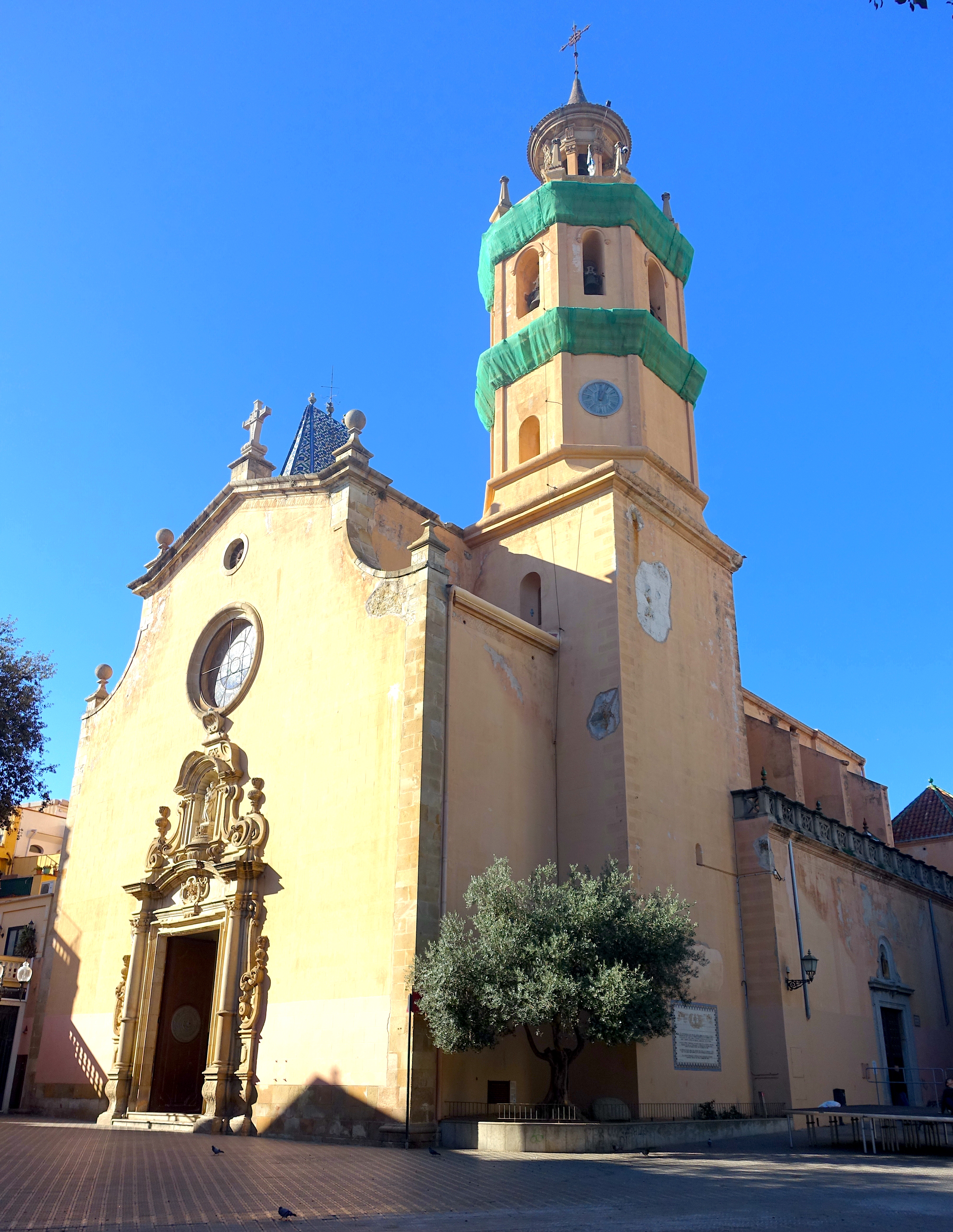
Iglesia de Santa María

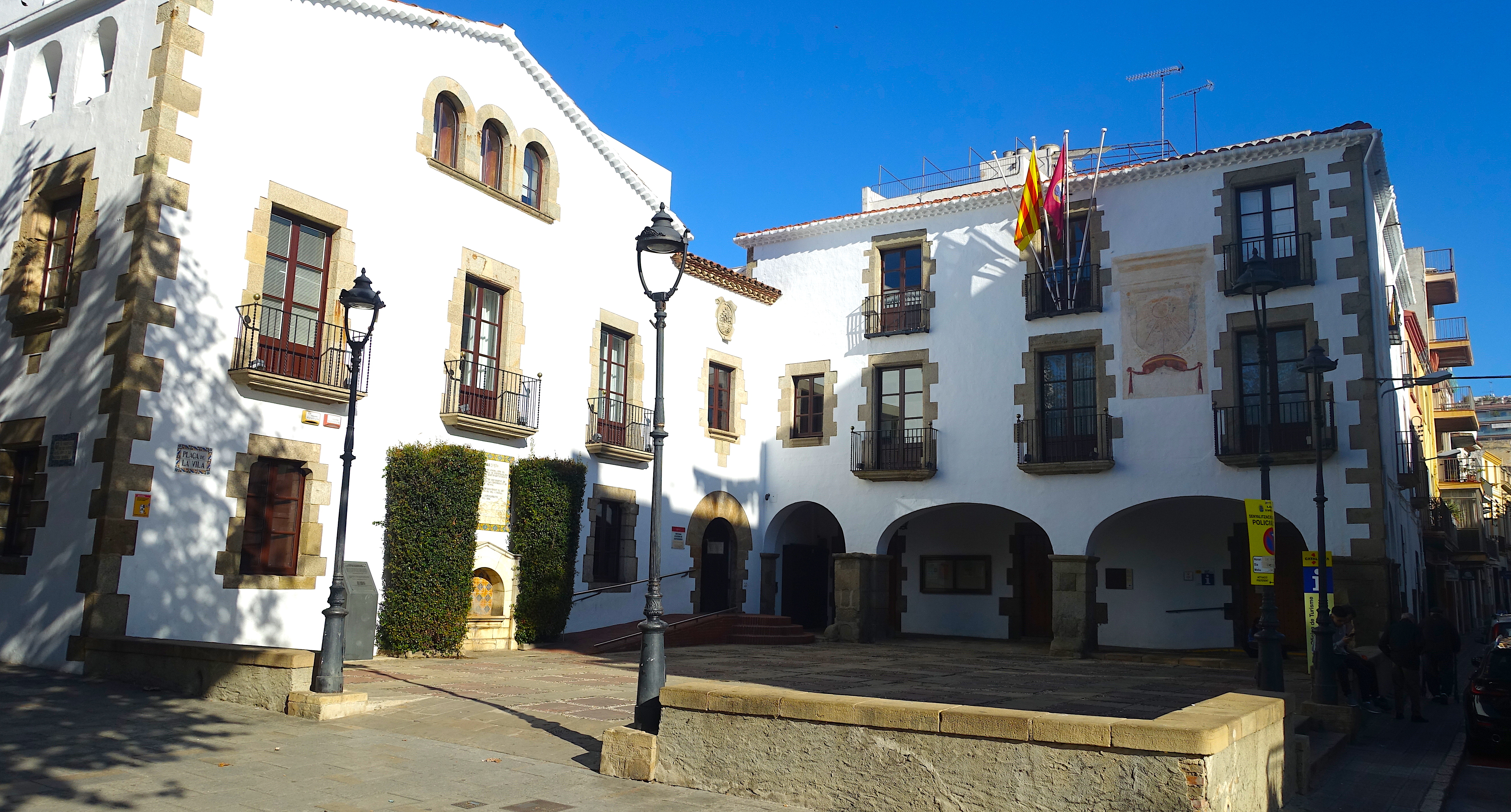
Ayuntamiento de Arenys de Mar (city town hall)

Arenys is 47 km (29 mi) to Barcelona by the N-II road or the A-19 highway. The district train (R1 line) covers the distance to Plaça de Catalunya, in the centre of Barcelona in 50 minutes. The road B-511 communicates with the highway A-7 (exit Sant Celoni) through Collsacreu. The Montseny massif is quite close, while the Natural Parks of Montnegre and the Corredor are just round the corner. Girona is 60 km (37 mi) away, and for a trip to Montserrat you need little more than an hour. Barcelona International Airport is 56 km (35 mi) away, that of Girona-Costa Brava, 40 km (25 mi). Arenys de Mar also has a bus line that connects the town with Arenys de Munt and Sant Iscle de Vallalta.

== Notable people ==
- Santa Paula Montal (1799–1889), founder of the Congregation of the Daughters of Mary, Sisters of the Pious Schools, was born in the town
- Fidel Fita i Colomer, a Jesuit and director of the Royal Academy of History of Spain
- Josep Xifré i Casas, businessman
- Maurici de Sivatte i de Bobadilla (1901–1980), Carlist politician
- Jaime Partagás y Ravell, founded the cigar brand that bears his name
- Salvador Espriu (1913–1985), poet, is buried in the town
- Fèlix Cucurull i Tey, writer, politician and historian
- Lluís Danés (1972–), film director
- Cesc Fàbregas (1987–), footballer
- Sergi Gomez (1992–), footballer
- Jaume Mora, physician

== See also ==
- Arenys de Mar Yacht Club
- Felucca Plutón

== Bibliography ==
- Panareda Clopés, Josep Maria; Rios Calvet, Jaume; Rabella Vives, Josep Maria (1989). Guia de Catalunya, Barcelona: Caixa de Catalunya. ISBN 84-87135-01-3 (Spanish). ISBN 84-87135-02-1 (Catalan).
