= José María Martínez-Hidalgo y Terán =

Spanish sailor and museum director

José María Martínez-Hidalgo y Terán (December 11, 1913, Sama de Langreo - February 7, 2005, Barcelona) was a Spanish sailor. He began his career in the Merchant Navy, later became an officer of the Spanish Navy and finally, in 1958, was appointed director of the Maritime Museum of Barcelona, a position he held until his retirement in 1983.

== Biography and professional background ==
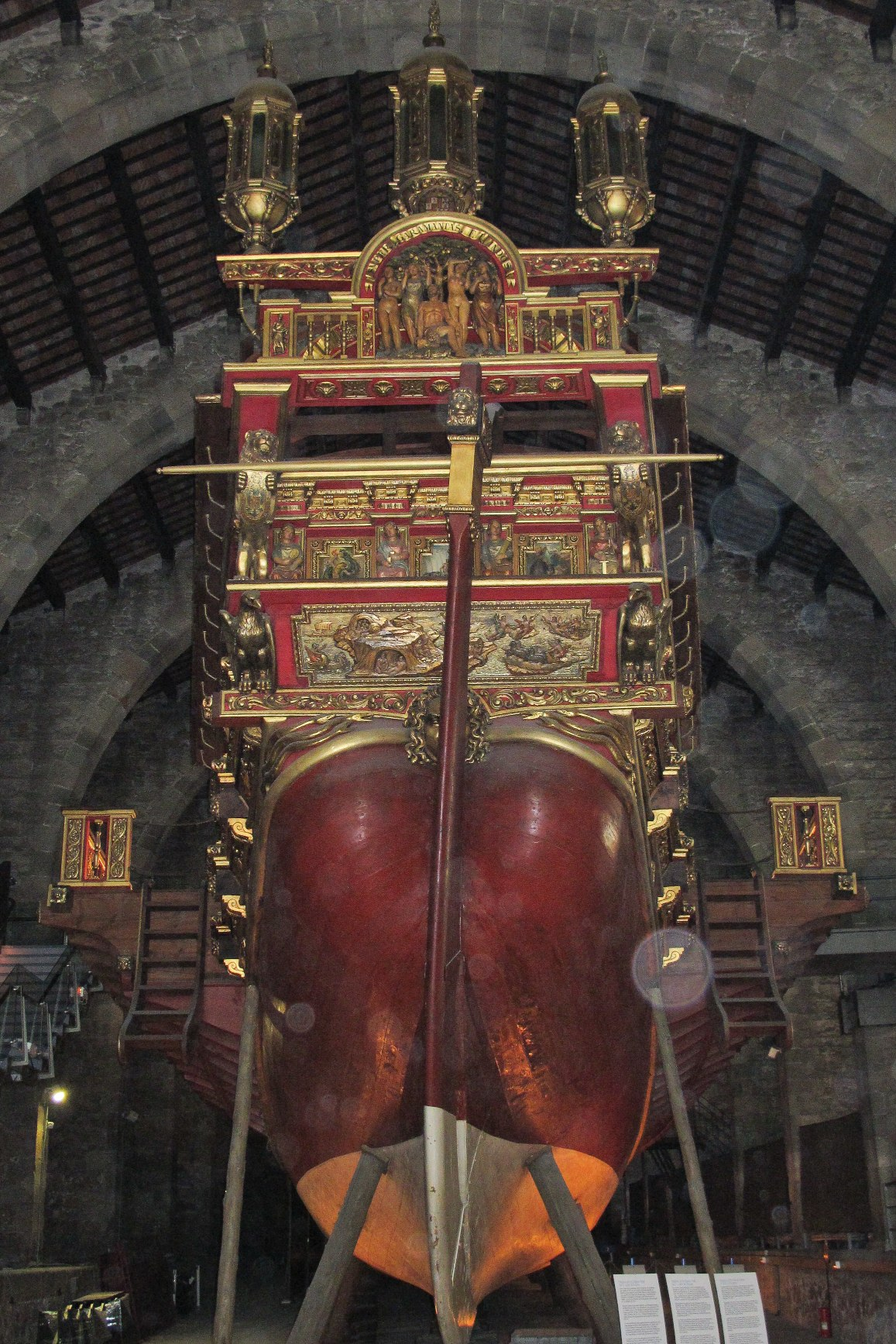
Stern view of the Real replica in the museum.

While in his role of director of the Maritime Museum of Barcelona and as a personal collaboration, José Maria Martínez-Hidalgo compiled, in a ten years work, all the documentation that he could gather from the Galera Real, publishing it in his book "Lepanto: la batalla, la galera "Real", recuerdos, reliquias y trofeos." Thanks to all this data, the Maritime Museum of Barcelona began the construction of a replica in 1965, being finished in 1971, just for celebration of the centenary of the construction of the original galley, that was built in the same shipyard where the museum is located nowadays, and served as the flagship of the Juan of Austria admiral of the Holy League against the Turks in the Battle of Lepanto in the Gulf of Corinth in 1571.

In the years 1975-1978 Martínez-Hidalgo helped the transfer of the Maritime Museum of Barcelona with the arrival of the democracy (later, in 1993, the Consorci of Drassanes Reials i Museu Marítim de Barcelona was created).

In 1983, subsidized by the Spanish Navy with the Institute of Naval History and Culture of Spain, Martínez-Hidalgo he dedicated his time to the study of the famous caravels of Columbus. This study was used as a basis for the construction project of the exact replicas of the Christofer Columbus Santa Maria, La Pinta and La Niña.

He collaborated in this way with Javier Pastor Quijada in "Evocations on the Coca de Mataró". Has donated his private library to CNAM, of which he was a member.

== Works ==
- Columbus ships (Martínez-Hidalgo, JM - Book) -5 issues published in 1966 in English
- The ships of the discovery and its men (Martínez-Hidalgo, JM - Book) -8 editions published between 1991 and 1992 in Castilian
- Details of construction and operation of Colón, boats in the decade of 1490 and reconstructions of 19 and 20 century, these boats constitute the main themes of this specialized study from reading the available sources but without footnotes Of page. - Handbook of Latin American Studies, V. 58.
- General Encyclopedia of the sea (9 volumes) -13 published between 1957 and 1992 in Castilian
- Nautical dictionary: with equivalencies in English and French (Martínez-Hidalgo, JM - Book) -5 editions published between 1977 and 2002 in Castilian and English
- Vocabulary maritime Catalan-Castilian/Castilian-Catalan (Martínez-Hidalgo, JM - Book) -5 editions published in 1984 in Catalan and Castilian
- The ships of Colón (Martínez-Hidalgo, JM - Book) -5 issues published in 1969 in Castilian
- Lepanto: the battle, the galley "Real", memories, relics and trophies (Barcelona, ??Provincial House of Charity, Martínez-Hidalgo, JM - Book) -2 editions published in 1971 in Castilian
- The Maritime Museum of the Delegation of Barcelona (Martínez-Hidalgo, JM - Book) -2 editions published in 1985 in Castilian
- History and legend of the magnetic needle, contribution of the Spaniards to the progress of the nautical (Martínez-Hidalgo, JM - Book) -2 editions published in 1946 in Castilian
- General Catalog of the Maritime Museum of 1965, by the Maritime Museum of the Delegation of Barcelona (Book) -2 editions published in 1965 in Castilian

== See also ==
- Maritime Museum of Barcelona
- Real (1568)
- Arenys de Mar Yacht Club
