= Barcelona Royal Shipyard =

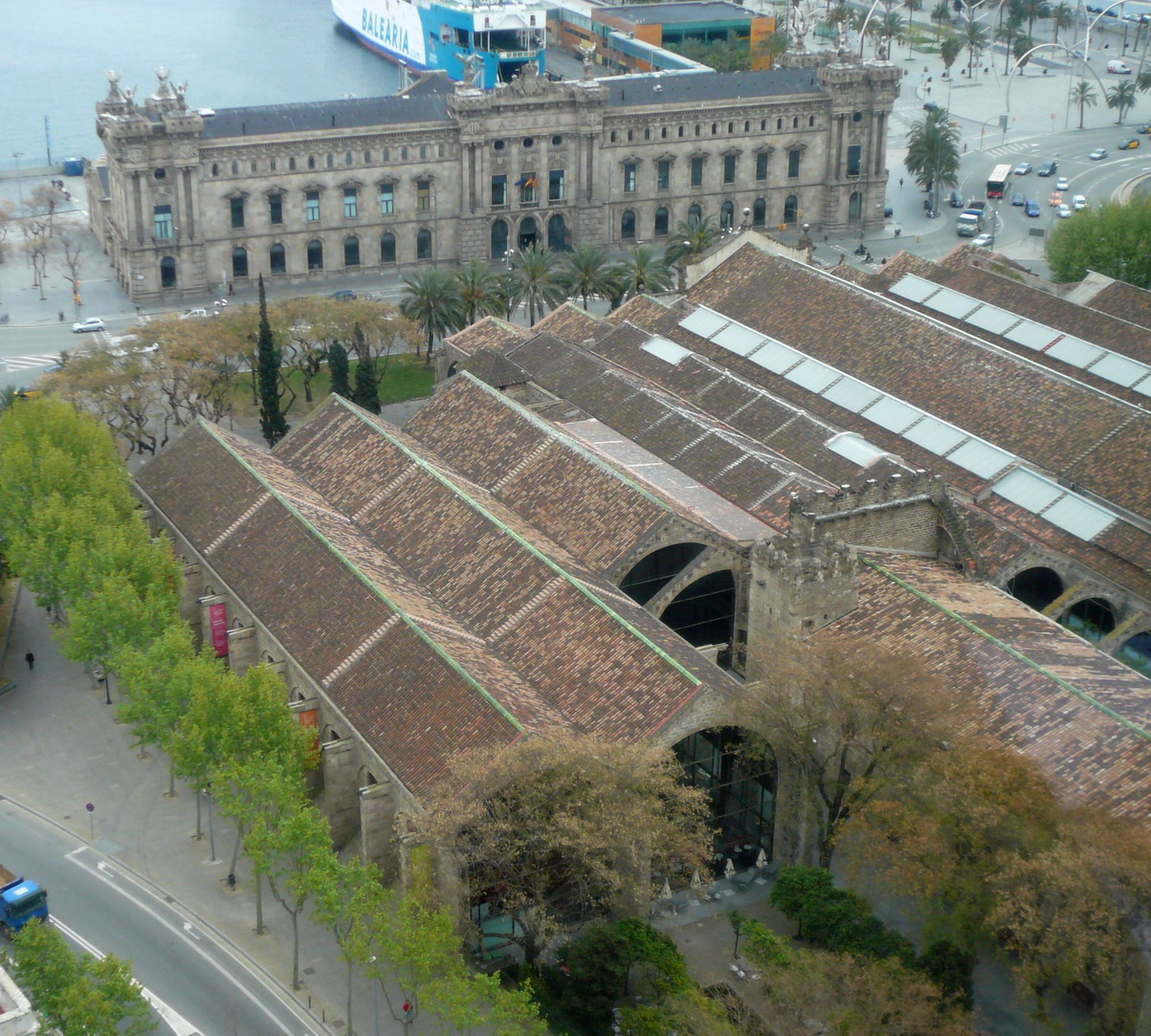
- Aerial view of the building

- Location within Barcelona

General information
- Type: Historic building
- Architectural style: Gothic
- Location: Barcelona, Catalonia, Spain
- Coordinates: 41.375°N 2.1763°E
- Construction started: 13th century
- Completed: 14th century
- Renovated: 17th-18th centuries

The Barcelona Royal Shipyard (Catalan: Drassanes Reials de Barcelona, Spanish: Atarazanas Reales de Barcelona) is a shipyard and former military building of Gothic architecture placed at the Port Vell area of the Port of Barcelona. Today it houses the Barcelona Maritime Museum. Construction started during the 13th century under the rule of Peter III of Aragon. During excavations in 2012 it was discovered that in the late 16th century a new building was constructed on top of the old medieval dockyard, giving the building its current structure. These excavations also uncovered a Roman graveyard. The shipyard's restoration was finished in early 2013. The museum was reopened in 2014.

== History ==
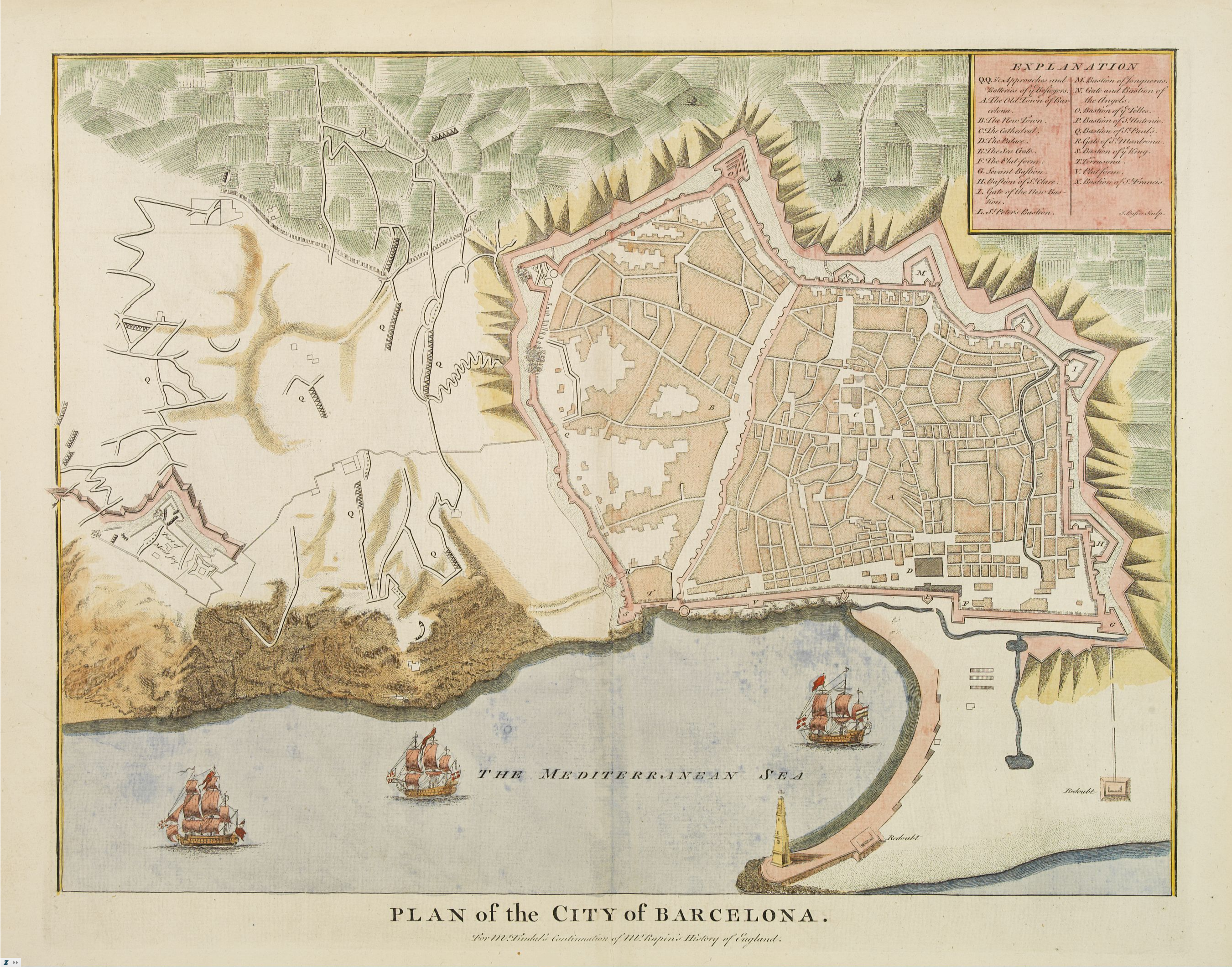
Barcelona c. 1700, with the shipyard at the lower left corner of the city

The construction of the dockyards was done in several stages, spanning over four centuries:

- 13th century: There is reference to an old shipyard in a document dated 1241, when James I of Aragon ordered that no house or structure should be built on the coastline between the city walls and "the atarazana" (Spanish derived from the Arabic dár aṣṣiná‘a) which is to the west".
- 13th century: This period of construction started with the War of the Sicilian Vespers. In 1285, Peter III of Aragon ordered the construction of the shipyard, a rectangular fortification with no roof consisting of fortified walls and four towers, of which two still exist. The shipyard opened to the east.
- 14th century: This expansion comprises the period from 1328 to 1390. The city walls were expanded and included the shipyard inside the fortified city. A roof was added to prevent the degradation of the galleys stored during winter.
- 15th century: Construction started in 1390 and lasted until 1415. A new area, Porxo No, was added to the building. This part of the shipyard is also known as Pere IV. The area was meant to be a royal palace, but the idea was finally discarded. Excavations show that only the foundations for the palace were built.
- 16th century: The medieval building was replaced by a new dockyard a few meters inland. The new shipyards continue to use Gothic architecture, since it had proven to be the most practical and reliable at the time. This decision, however, managed to confuse historians trying to date the building. The construction of the new dockyards and the move inland was caused by the construction of the city's port during the 15th century. The new port had changed the currents and moved the shore inland, causing severe flooding in the old medieval building.
- 17th century: In 1612, the Catalan government decided to add three naves to the building. Following the Catalan Revolt (1640–1652), the Spanish government further amplified the shipyard both as an arsenal and a barracks.
- 18th century: In 1725, two more barracks were constructed; one for cavalry and one for infantry. These barracks were torn down in 1935. The last major update came between 1742 and 1749, when the roofs of the two central naves were converted into a single nave, known as Nau Central.

From the beginning, the aim of the shipyard was to build the galleys for the Aragonese Armada. The shipyard was also a naval arsenal, which was used to store galleys and all the rigging and apparatus needed. The arsenal also produced a great deal of material, both sails and cordages for the ships and arms for the men. Naval arsenals of the time, normally, had to produce and store food also.

After the 1381 renovation, the building had eight naves, 8.4 m high and 8.4 m wide. The naves were, approximately, 60 m long, consisting of 17 columns 77 cm wide and 6 m high. Thanks to a written record of the time we know that four new storage areas were built. Ashlar from the nearby mountain of Montjuïc was used for the construction, with sand from the beach in front of the shipyard, wood from the Baix Ebre and Gavarres, and ropes and tiles from Valencia. During the rule of Alfonso V of Aragon, the shipyard experienced its highest activity. In 1423, twelve galleys were built simultaneously. In 1571, the royal galley of John of Austria, commonly known as the Real, was built at the shipyard. This galley was the flagship at the Battle of Lepanto. There is a reproduction of this galley at the Barcelona Maritime Museum.

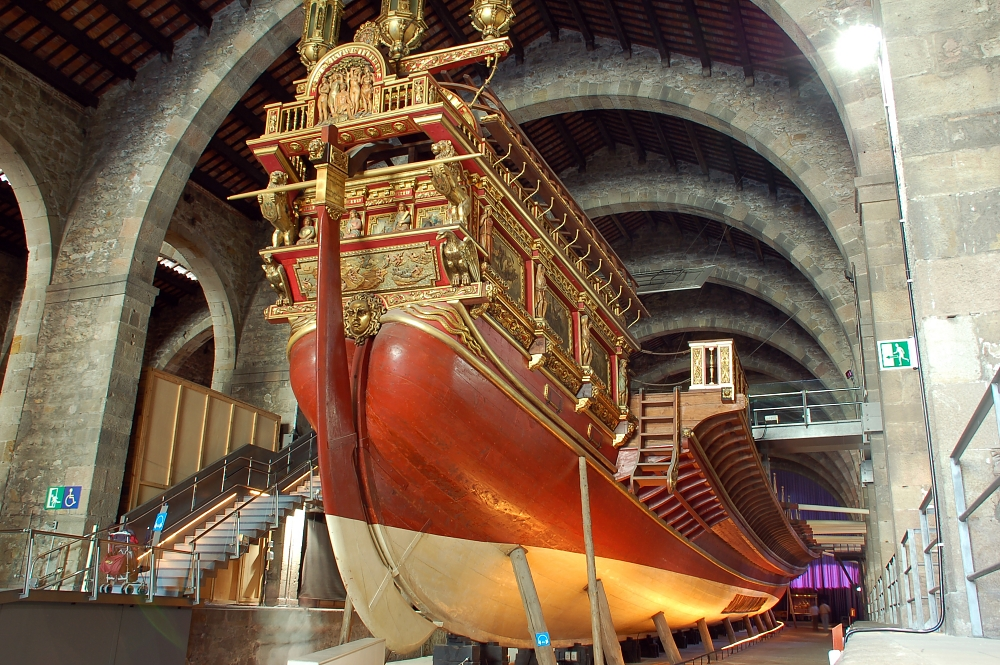
Reproduction of the royal galley of John of Austria at the Barcelona Maritime Museum

During the 18th century, the shipbuilding was moved to the Cartagena shipyard, and after the War of Spanish Succession the site was used as an artillery barrack for the Spanish Army. The building was used to build, store, and repair artillery pieces. In 1935, the building was given to the Barcelona city hall who decide to use it as a maritime museum, which opened in 1941.

During 19 and 20 July, 1936, shortly after the military coup that triggered the Spanish Civil War had reached Barcelona, the shipyard was the site of a battle between militia of the Confederación Nacional del Trabajo (CNT) against a part of the nationalist faction's army. CNT's militia were victorious, but the battle resulted in the death of Francisco Ascaso.

On 5 May 1976, the building was declared a Cultural Site of National Interest.

== Metro ==
The closest subway/tube station is Drassanes, which is the Catalan word for shipyard, in the line of the Barcelona Metro network.

== See also ==
- Catalan Gothic

== Bibliography ==
- Volum 3 (1998), Art de Catalunya, Urbanisme, arquitectura civil i industrial, Barcelona, Edicions L'isard. ISBN 84-89931-04-6
- Volum III (2003), L'Art Gòtic a Catalunya, Arquitectura III, Barcelona, Enciclopèdia Catalana. ISBN 84-412-0887-5
- Volum 7 (2004), La Gran Enciclopèdia en català, Barcelona, Edicions 62. ISBN 84-297-5435-0
