= Maritime Museum of Barcelona =

Coordinates: 41.375556°N 2.175833°E

- Museu Marítim de Barcelona (MMB)
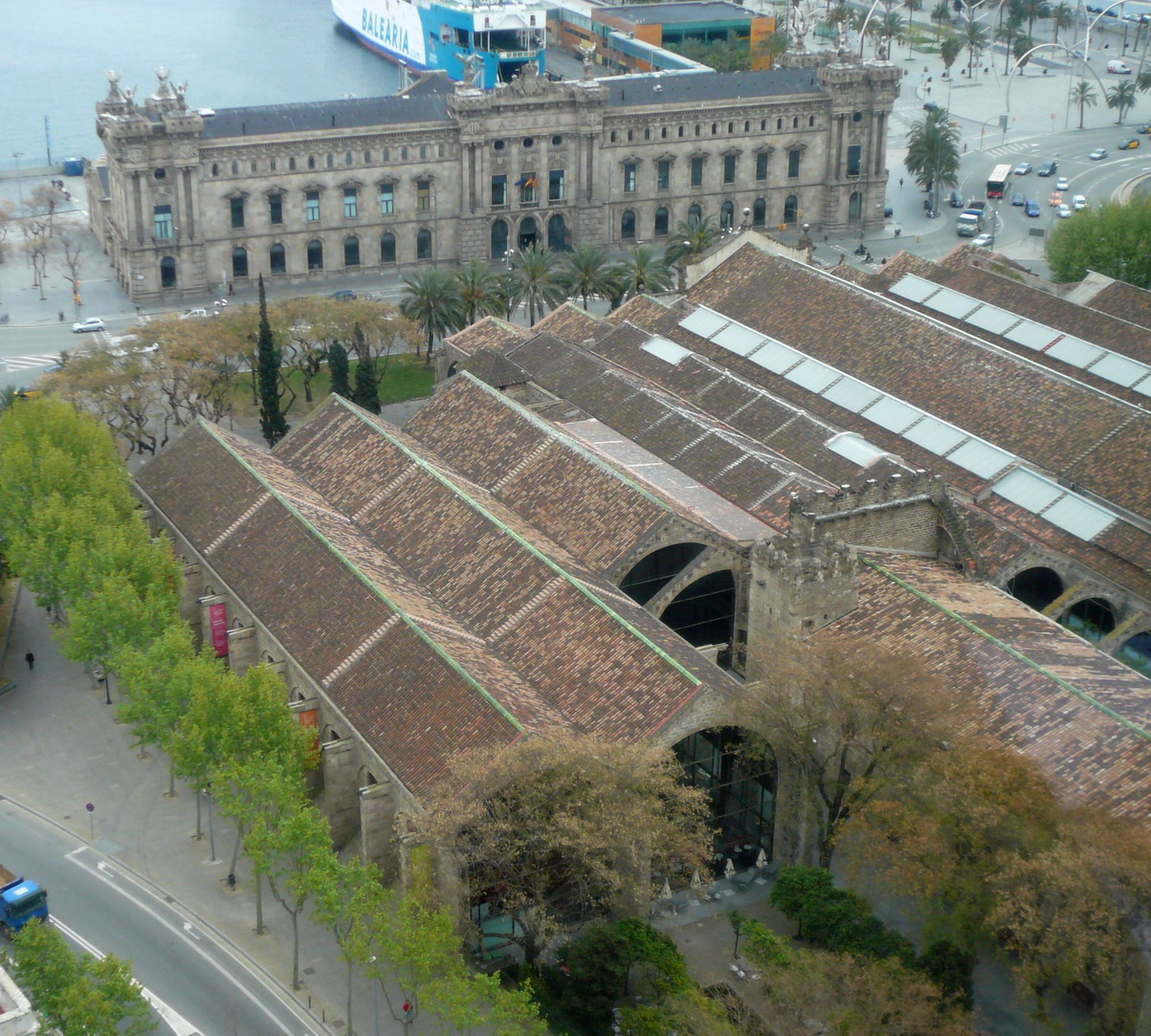
- Established: 23 October 1936; 89 years ago
- Location: Barcelona Royal Shipyard, Avinguda de les Drassanes s/n, Barcelona
- Type: Maritime museum
- Visitors: 301,836 (2018)
- Director: Elvira Mata i Enrich
- Public transit access: Drassanes
- Website: www.mmb.cat

The Maritime Museum of Barcelona (Catalan: Museu Marítim de Barcelona, MMB) is located in the building of Drassanes Reials de Barcelona, the royal arsenal of Barcelona, dedicated to shipbuilding between the thirteenth century and eighteenth century. The first mention of these arsenals date from 1243 in a document indicating the boundaries of the city of Barcelona where it mentions its shipyard.

It shows the history of the navigation from the early days together with the history of the Spanish Navy since the Catholic Monarchs, in the 15th century, up to the present. It also hosts several navigation instruments, weapons, portolans and paintings. The museum was declared Museum of National Interest by the Government of Catalonia.

== Building ==
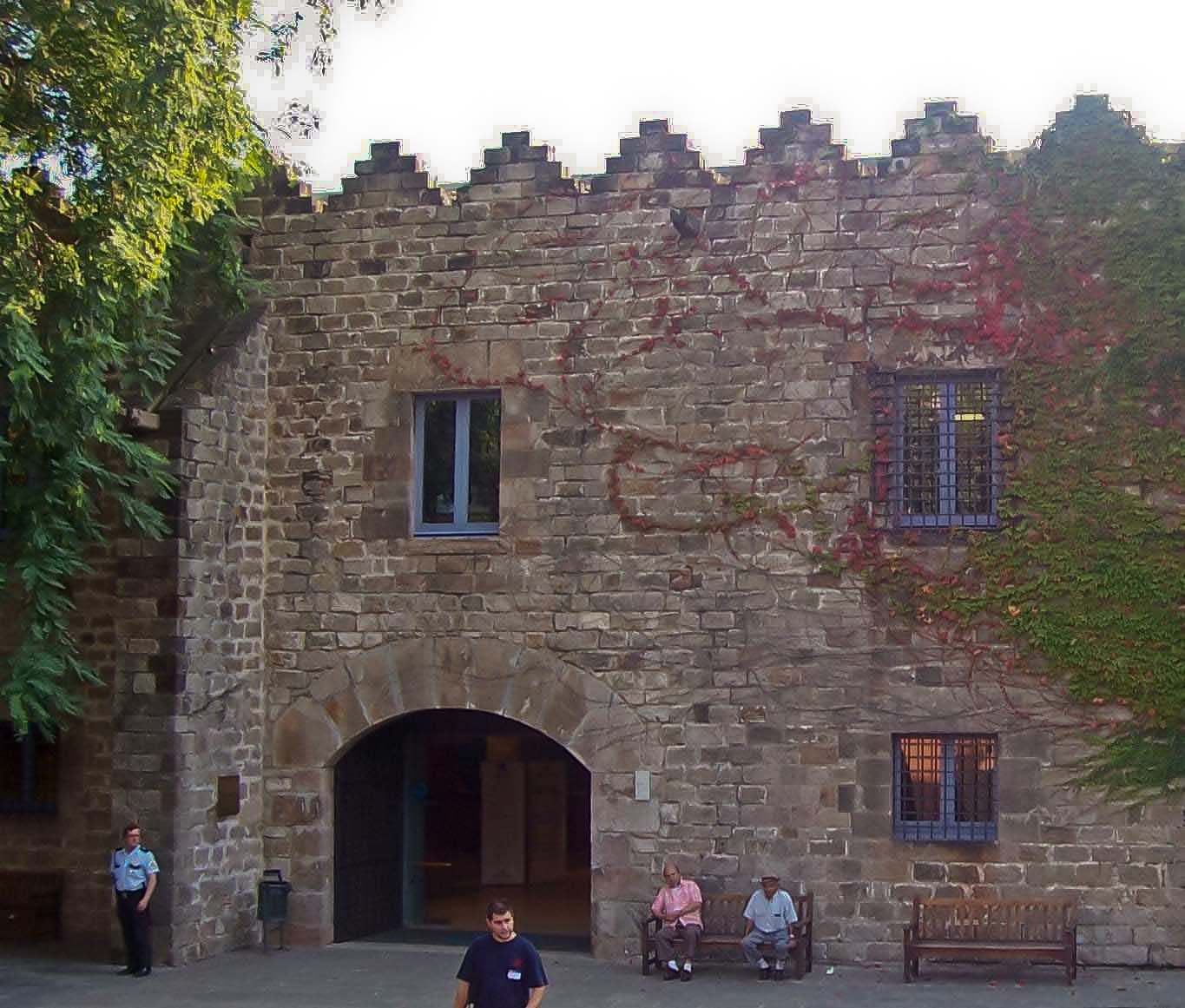
Entrance to the Maritime Museum

It is located inside Barcelona Royal Shipyard (Catalan: Drassanes Reials de Barcelona; Spanish: Atarazanas Reales de Barcelona) a shipyard and former military building of Gothic architecture placed at the Port Vell area of the Port of Barcelona. Construction started during the 13th century under the rule of Peter III of Aragon.

The building is of Gothic style, its construction was carried out in a first stage between 1283 / 1328 and the second between 1328 / 1390. Subsequent reforms and extensions have been made, basically keeping the original structure.

During excavations in 2012 it was discovered that in the late 16th century a new building was constructed on top of the old medieval dockyard, giving the building its current structure. These excavations also uncovered a Roman graveyard. The shipyard's restoration was finished in early 2013. The Museum was reopened in 2014.

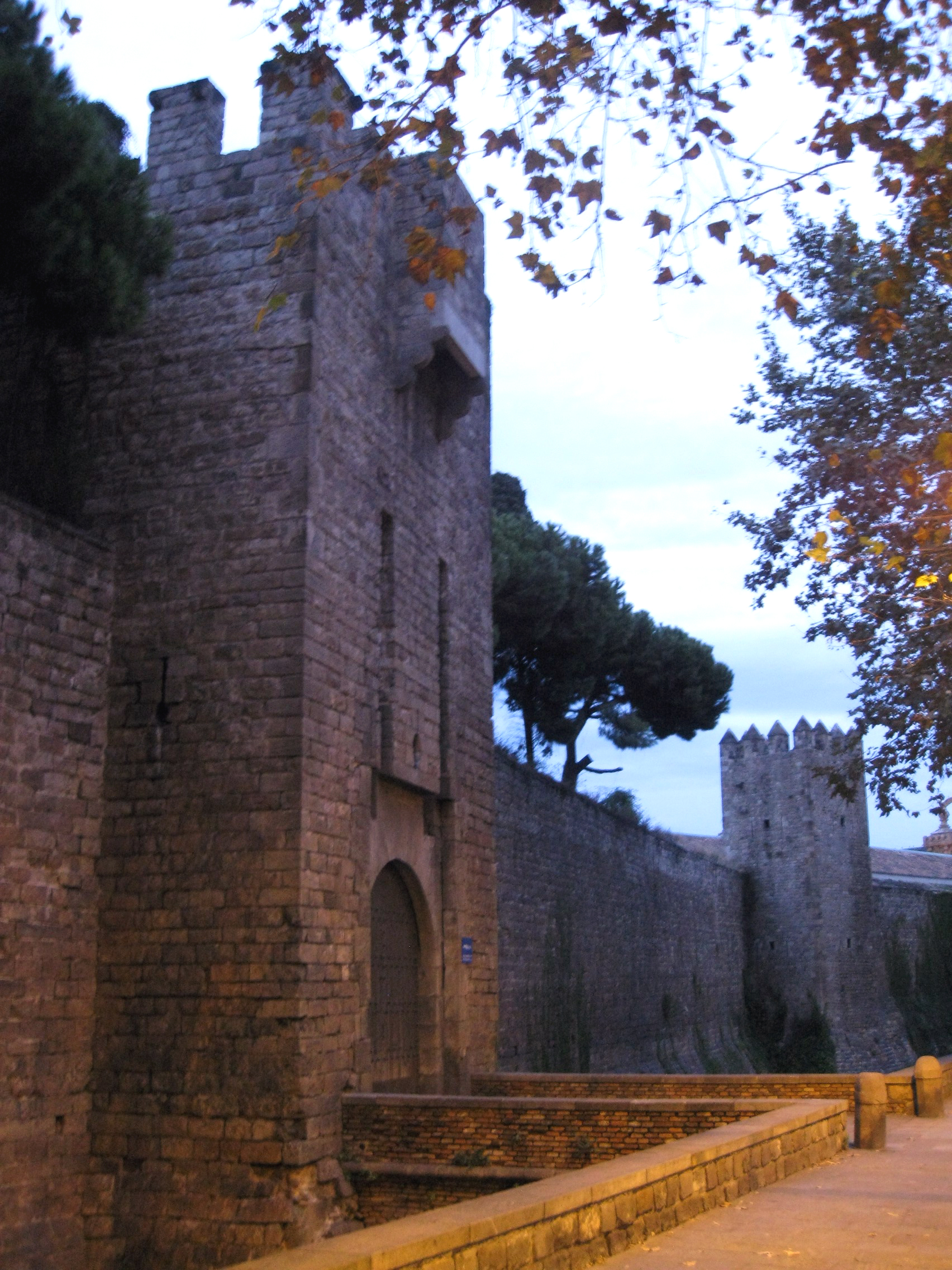
The Portal de Santa Madrona

== See also ==
- Majorcan cartographic school
- Cresques workshop
- Portolan chart
- José María Martínez-Hidalgo y Terán

== Bibliography ==
- Volume 3 (1998), Art de Catalunya, Urbanisme, arquitectura civil i industrial, Barcelona, Edicions L'isard. ISBN 84-89931-04-6
- Volume 14 (2004), La Gran Enciclopèdia en català, Barcelona, Edicions 62. ISBN 84-297-5442-3
- Martínez-Hidalgo, José María; Domínguez, Juan Manuel (1984). El Museo Marítimo de Barcelona. H.M.B. ISBN 8486054176. OCLC 802475003.
- García Domingo, Enric, Història del Museu Marítim de Barcelona 1929/1939- Edició Museu Marítim de Barcelona
- Ibañez, Cristina, Història del Museu Marítim de Barcelona 1940/1992- Edició Museu Marítim de Barcelona
- Valldeoriola, Mar, Memòria del Museu Marítim de Barcelona 1993/1999- Edició Museu Marítim de Barcelona
