= Candini =

Candini is a surname. Notable people with the surname include:

- Lourdes Candini (born 1966), Mexican synchronised swimmer
- Milo Candini (1917–1998), American baseball player
- Montserrat Candini (1957–2024), Spanish politician
