= Calella =

- Municipality

- Coat of arms

- Location in Catalonia Calella (Spain)
- Coordinates: 41°36′46″N 2°39′27″E
- Country: Spain
- Community: Catalonia
- Province: Barcelona
- Comarca: Maresme

Government
  - Mayor: Marc Buch (2022) (CiU)

Area
  - Total: 8.0 km^{2} (3.1 sq mi)
- Elevation: 5 m (16 ft)

Population (2025-01-01)
  - Total: 20,864
  - Density: 2,600/km^{2} (6,800/sq mi)
- Demonym(s): Calellenc, calellenca
- Website: www.calella.cat

Calella (Catalan pronunciation: [kəˈleʎə]) is a municipality located in the Maresme region of Catalonia, Spain, located 50 km from Barcelona, 50 km from Girona, and 6 km from the Montnegre-Corredor Natural Park. It has a Mediterranean climate, and is known for its beaches, which span about 3 km.

It has several natural areas, such as Dalmau Park, Manuel Puigvert promenade, Garbí promenade, the Calella Lighthouse, and The Turrets.

== History ==
=== Early history ===
From the 1st century BC, the progressive process of Romanization gave rise to numerous villas in the lower areas of the coast, connected by the Roman road that led to Barcino (Barcelona). These were agricultural mansions dedicated to the production of wheat, oil, or wine. In Calella, the remains of a Roman villa that could be dated between the 1st century BC and the 1st century AD have been excavated close to the city hospital.

Calella has approximately 700 years of documented history. In the 11th century, evidence emerged of a settlement in the Capaspre area, which was integrated into the parish of Pineda de Mar and under the stately rule of the Lord of Montpalau Castle. It consisted of a small number of farmhouses located at the top of the stream, with a defense tower and a couple of chapels dedicated to Saint Quirze and Saint Julita.

The name Calella has been documented since the beginning of the 12th century. From then on, away from the Saracen danger, some residents of the Capaspre area built their first fishermen's houses near the mouth of the stream. The will of Bishop Bernat Umbert, written in 1101, was the oldest document found that refers to Calella. Viscount Bernat II of Cabrera, Lord of Montpalau, granted the privilege of having a market as well as a settlement charter in 1327. The market privileges were enlarged in 1328.

These privileges, upheld in 1423 by Violant de Cabrera on behalf of her husband, and in 1426 by Bernat Joan de Cabrera himself, along with the fishing development, favored urban growth: during the 15th century many peasant families from neighboring villages settled in the village. By then, it had a defense tower and a new chapel dedicated to Saint Elm.

=== Modern History ===
During the sixteenth century, the city was drawing up its urban framework. In 1525, the Pope authorized the construction of a church. Three years later, the works of the temple began. While the Church was being built, the people of Calella received the sacraments in the chapel of Sant Elm. In 1564, the new church was consecrated. In 1599, Gastó de Moncada, Marquis of Aitona and Viscount of Cabrera, granted new privileges establishing the definitive organization of the municipal council, represented by juries and councillors, renewable annually, and dividing the inhabitants into three classes: wealthy, craftsmen and day labourers. In the 1570s, Abraham Ortelius first mapped Calella's name on a map of the peninsula. In 1586, Calella already had an urban plan made to scale.

After a long period of stagnation due to wars and epidemics that ravaged the country during the seventeenth century, growth continued. In 1714, once the War of the Spanish Succession ended, the city began a process of demographic and economic growth, going from the 768 inhabitants in 1718 to 2,637 in 1787. During these years, the traditional agricultural and fishing activities were expanded with boat construction. The last third of the century, thanks to the liberalization of trade with the American colonies, was the golden age of overseas trade, which contributed decisively to the industrial development of the entire region. In 1790, there were already more than 200 looms dedicated to the manufacture of silk and cotton stockings.

By the end of the century, many new streets had been added to the initial nucleus, making Església Street and Jovara Street the new central streets.

=== 19th and 20th centuries ===
Despite wars and revolutions, industrial activity (textiles) and transatlantic trade maintained their production. In 1854, the construction of large boats and fishing boats began. On August 1, 1861, the train officially arrived in Calella, although it had been stopping at a Calella temporary stop since 1859. The population began a period of growth, from 3,500 inhabitants in 1860 to 4,316 in 1900. The cause of this growth was the installation of the first steam-powered factories, which offset the upheaval in maritime trade caused by the loss of the colonies.

The first decades of the 20th century were a time of splendour for Calella's industry, which was cut short by the civil war. The decline of the textile sector went closely with the spectacular development of tourism, especially from the sixties and on. This process is clearly reflected in demographics: strong growth from 1900 to 1930, stagnation between 1930 and 1960, and spectacular growth during the 1960s and 1970s.

Between the 1970s until the mid-1990s, Calella became an important tourist destination for Central European tourism (German, Dutch, Danish, English, French), and was thus popularly known as Calella dels Alemanys, as its population tripled in the high tourist season (which coincides with the end of spring, summer and the beginning of autumn). Currently, the variety of tourism has grown, and visitors are received from virtually every country in Europe.

== Places of interest ==
=== Locations of historical and patrimonial importance (Note: Ruta Renaixentista / "Compilació Històrica de Calella", by Domingo Mir. Ed. Cedro, 1982) ===
==== Parish Church of Santa Maria and Sant Nicolau. ====
In 1525 Calella obtained from Pope Clement VII the bull that granted it the right to become an independent parish. The construction of the new temple was entrusted to the Barcelona master builder Pere Suarís in 1539. Later the work was entrusted to the builder Antoni Mateu, but his premature death forced the hiring of the famous sculptor and master builder Jean de Tours, who died in Calella in 1563 leaving the work unfinished. Finally, the masters Joan Soler, from Calella, and Perris Rohat, a Frenchman living in Mataró, were commissioned to complete the temple. The new church was consecrated in 1564.

The Baroque style façade, the work of Jean de Tours, consists of a stone altarpiece from the 16th century, in the Plateresque style, with the heads of the twelve apostles. In the niche is Saint Nicolau de Bari, under whose dedication, together with that of Santa Maria, the parish was consecrated.

==== Sant Quirze and Santa Julita Chapel ====
At the end of the 14th century Calella had a chapel dedicated to Sant Elm, near the beach, which was enabled as a parish in 1528, while the new church of Santa Maria and Sant Nicolau was being built. In March 1820, the patrons of Calella, Sant Quirze and Santa Julita, were welcomed in Sant Elm Chapel due to the collapse of the hermitage located in La Riera Capaspre, changing its invocation.

==== Can Galceran (can Giol) ====
Its construction began in 1430, it was completed at a later date, in the 15th and 16th centuries after various acquisitions of land. It was the manor house of the Monet Ballester family (15th century) and later the Galceran family (17th century). The elements to be highlighted are the semicircular doorway, the Renaissance windows, the talking shield (a Galceran, a bush) and the machicolation over the main door.

==== Can Salvador de la Plaça ====
A building with a 4-sided roof, built in the 14th century. This house can be considered one of the first houses that formed the current urban nucleus of Calella around the market. Its most outstanding elements are its Renaissance portal, the decoration of the windows and the defensive machicolation on the corner of Carrer Bartrina, the street that overlooked the sea. It is currently the headquarters of the Municipal Library.

==== Can Bartrina ====
Manor house of the Coma de Capaspre family, with a shield over the door, and also of the Bataller family and later on of the Prim family, notaries from Barcelona. Its unique elements are the portal, the windows, its classic sgraffito and the defensive tower to protect the façade, with stone corners and crowned with a machicolation of which only the corbels that supported it remain. The complex, including the defense tower, was completed in the 16th century.

==== Can Basart ====
It had formerly been the home of the Pla family, which linked up with the Basart family in the early 18th century. The house is Baroque style and part of the façade preserves the sgraffito with geometric motifs.

==== The Lighthouse ====
The Calella Lighthouse is one of the most characteristic symbols of the city. It is located at the top of the Capaspre, the same place where an old medieval tower had stood. It was inaugurated in 1859, with an olive oil light lantern. The lighthouse housed the lighthouse keeper's house on the ground floor, and both the lantern and the building have undergone several modifications over time. Since 2011 it has housed the Calella Lighthouse Interpretation Center, where the lighthouse's communication relationships with its surroundings are explained.

==== The Turrets ====
Two towers built on the top of Capaspre in the mid-nineteenth century, one for civil use and the other for military use, intended for the transmission of optical signals through the optical telegraphy system. (Note: POUM and "Les Torretes de Calella a study", by Pere F. Porti i Gallart. Ajuntament de Calella, 1984.)

=== Works of the architect Jeroni Martorell Terrats: (Note: POUM y "Jeroni Martorell, un arquitecte per a Calella". Ajuntament de Calella. 2004.) (Note: "Anècdotes, Fets i Personatges de la Calella antiga". Calella, 1978) ===
==== Parc Dalmau ====
Extensive green area located in the city center, designed in the late 1920s from the purchase of land on the estate of Can Pelaio by the City Council, and then chaired by Jaume Dalmau. It is a unique place to walk and enjoy nature, with the botanical itinerary and places like La Font dels Lleons or the Pati del Ós. It annually hosts L'Aplec de la Sardana and various cultural and festive events. Inside the Park, an Air Raid Shelter was built in 1937 to protect the population from the bombings of the Civil War.

==== Passeig de Manuel Puigvert ====
This tree-lined promenade with centuries-old banana trees, stretches parallel to the beach and has become one of the city icons. Mayor Manuel Puigvert (1843–1913) started the project, and it was completed after his death in 1927. Jeroni Martorell had a balustrade built, decorated with lanterns, goblets and steps. The promenade hosts, among other activities, the Calella and Alt Maresme Fair and The Ironman sporting event.

==== Municipal Market ====
Noucentista style building built in 1927 in the old Plaça de l'Hostal (or del Rei). It consists of a single nave of 15x24 meters, and a porch on the main facade of Carrer Sant Joan. Next to it there is a water tower similar to that of the slaughterhouse. The market had a covered porch annex on the other side of the road, of the same style, now gone.

==== Former Costa i Fornaguera Library ====
The building, which follows the Noucentista style or the market and the slaughterhouse, was designed as a school group and was inaugurated in 1923. Later, in 1931, the public library was installed on the first floor. The ground floor is divided into two wings around a central courtyard, while the main entrance to the facade consists of a porch with classical columns supporting semi-circular arches. It is currently the municipal nursery "El Carrilet".

==== Old Municipal Slaughterhouse ====
Nouecentista construction, contemporary with the Market and the Library, inaugurated in 1927. Originally it had annexed constructions for the corrals, cold rooms or the watchman's house. A water tower was also built next to it.

== Demographics ==
1900	1930	1950	1970	1986	2020
4,316	7,886	7,642	9,696	11,320	19,277

The population nearly triples in the summer holiday season.

== Culture ==
=== Oral tradition – The story of "La Llopa" (the she-wolf) ===
The figure of "la Llopa" (the she-wolf) of Calella comes from an event that occurred around 1920. A local resident explained to the people of the local tavern that he had seen a wolf going down the stream. After a few days, he informed the mayor that he had seen two more wolves. Alarmed, farmers and volunteers went out to look for the animals, killing one of them and exposing it on the porch of the mayor's garden for the people to see.

But that couple of animals were actually nothing more than wolf dogs from a farm located between Sant Pol de Mar and Calella, which went to the slaughterhouse every day to eat the waste. Since then, the citizens of the surrounding towns, referring to the people of Calella, mockingly exclaim "Calella, la Llopa!". (Note: "Anecdotes, Fets i Personatges de la Calella Antiga". Calella, 1978)

=== Festivals and Traditions ===
- L'Aplec de la Sardana: This is a traditional Catalan dance which occurs every first Sunday in June. This has reoccured since 1926.
- Festa Major Petita (town Festival): This town festival occurs on the 16th of June, in honour of Sant Quirze and Santa Julita.
- Festa Major de la Minerva (Town Festival): This town festivals occurs on the 23rd of September.
- Calella i l'Alt Maresme Fair: 23 September. The Fair aims to be a Sample of Catalan products and traditions
- Beer Festival (Oktoberfest): Emulates the German tradition, during the month of October a large tent hosts German and European bands and offers a culinary sample of products from that country.
- Carnival Parade of The Alt Maresme
- Setmana de la Salut (health week) : "Per la teva salut Vincula' t"
- Feria Animalista (Pro-Animal Fair)
- European Choral Singing Festival
- Sing for Gold, the world choral cup
- Festimatge (film and photography festival)
- Screamin 'Festival
- Calella Film Festival
- Summer Nights Festival in Calella
- International Folklore Festival "Alegria"
- Calella Folk Festival
- Fira Renaixentista (Renaissance Fair)
- Amateur Theatre Competition
- Calella Rockfest Festival
- International festival "Canta al Mar"
- Temporada lírica (lyrical season)
- Calella está de Moda (Calella is fashionable)
- Jornades Internacionals Folclóricas de Catalunya (Folk Festival)
- Fira de la Gent Gran (the Elderly Fair)
- Jocs Florals (of Catalan Poetry Festival)
- Fira del Llibre (Book-Fair)
- Fira del disc (Record-Fair)
- Museums

=== Notable buildings ===
==== Museum of Tourism ====
The Museum of Tourism of Calella aims to show the history of tourism and its socio-cultural and economic effects at a global level. The visit to the Museum of Tourism (Mutur) proposes a walk through the history of tourism, counting from the routes of the first travelers and explorers to the present time of the sector. The equipment arises from the need to create and give value to tourism and heritage, consolidate a reference centre for research and disseminations of the tourism sector, promote the culture of tourism and create a center for citizen activity, thought and conceived with a vocation for public service and as a reference pedagogical center.

==== Museum – Municipal Archive of Calella Maria Codina Bagué ====
It is located in a large house of the XVl and XVll centuries, which over the years has been used for various purposes. Since 1979 it has been the headquarters of the Museum-Archive. This is a local multidisciplinary museum that researches, preserves and disseminates different aspects of the city's heritage. Collections of various themes are on display, highlighting, among others, those dedicated to the textile past, the overseas trade, the Gallart Art Gallery and the Barri Pharmacy.

Calella Lighthouse Interpretation Centre

The Calella Lighthouse Interpretation Center was opened to the public on June 13, 2011.

Around the figure of the Calella Lighthouse, the Centre aims to explain the communication relations from three perspectives: the maritime communications, for this intrinsic functionality of orientation to boats, the terrestrial communications, through optical telegraphy that we can contemplate in The Turrets, close to the Lighthouse, and the urban communication with the city, by means of church bells and various bell towers. The contents are explained through audio-visual materials and texts in three languages: Catalan, Spanish and English.

The Air-raid shelter of Dalmau Park

The air shelter was built in 1937 in order to protect the civilian population from air-attacks. It had a capacity to shelter 3,600 people. It is part of the Memorial Spaces Network of Catalonia and in 2010 was restored and signposted in order to open it to the public.

=== Sports ===
The local football team is CF Calella.

=== Film and television ===
Since 2010, Calella City Council has been part of the Catalonia Film Commission, a network of filming offices throughout Catalonia created to facilitate filming in its spaces. With this intention, the city council has created Calella Film Office, a free public service that provides assistance to filming and audiovisual productions in the search for locations, management of permits, to make Calella a Plato City.

Main audiovisual events include:

- Calella Film Festival
- Festimatge

== Economy ==
The service sector and specifically the tourism sector is clearly the engine of the municipality's economy. Calella has been a tourist destination since the first tourists discovered the city, when the people of Calella lived on fishing and the countryside, first, and the textile industry, later. Over the years, tourism has become the engine of the city's economy. To the natural elements such as the sun and the beach, attractions have been added such as sports tourism, which is one in which the main reason for the trip is the practice of some kind of sport or physical activity and the visit of the city for witness 'in situ' a competition or a sporting event, family tourism and cultural tourism.

The town has an urban layout with a central pedestrian and commercial area, green spaces, and accommodation for tourists. In recent years, Calella has attempted to pivot its economy towards sport, healthcare, cultural and family tourism. Calella is known as the "tourist capital of the Costa del Maresme," according to Spain's official tourism website. The town welcomes some 250,000 tourists per year, as of 2016.

== Healthcare ==
- Hospital "Sant Jaume". This has 147 hospital beds, 4 surgery rooms, 5 operating rooms, 3 delivery rooms, 38 external consultations, 20-day hospital places and 34 emergency boxes
- The Basic Health Area of Calella (ABS) is made up of a single Primary Care Centre, the CAP Calella. This device covers more than 18,700 people.
- Creu Groga: Private Medical Centre with 35 medical specialities, 123 doctors and more 27 technicians and professionals
- Three Elderly Day- Centres (capacity 80 people)
- Five Old Age Homes (capacity 496 residents)

== Calella Photo Gallery ==
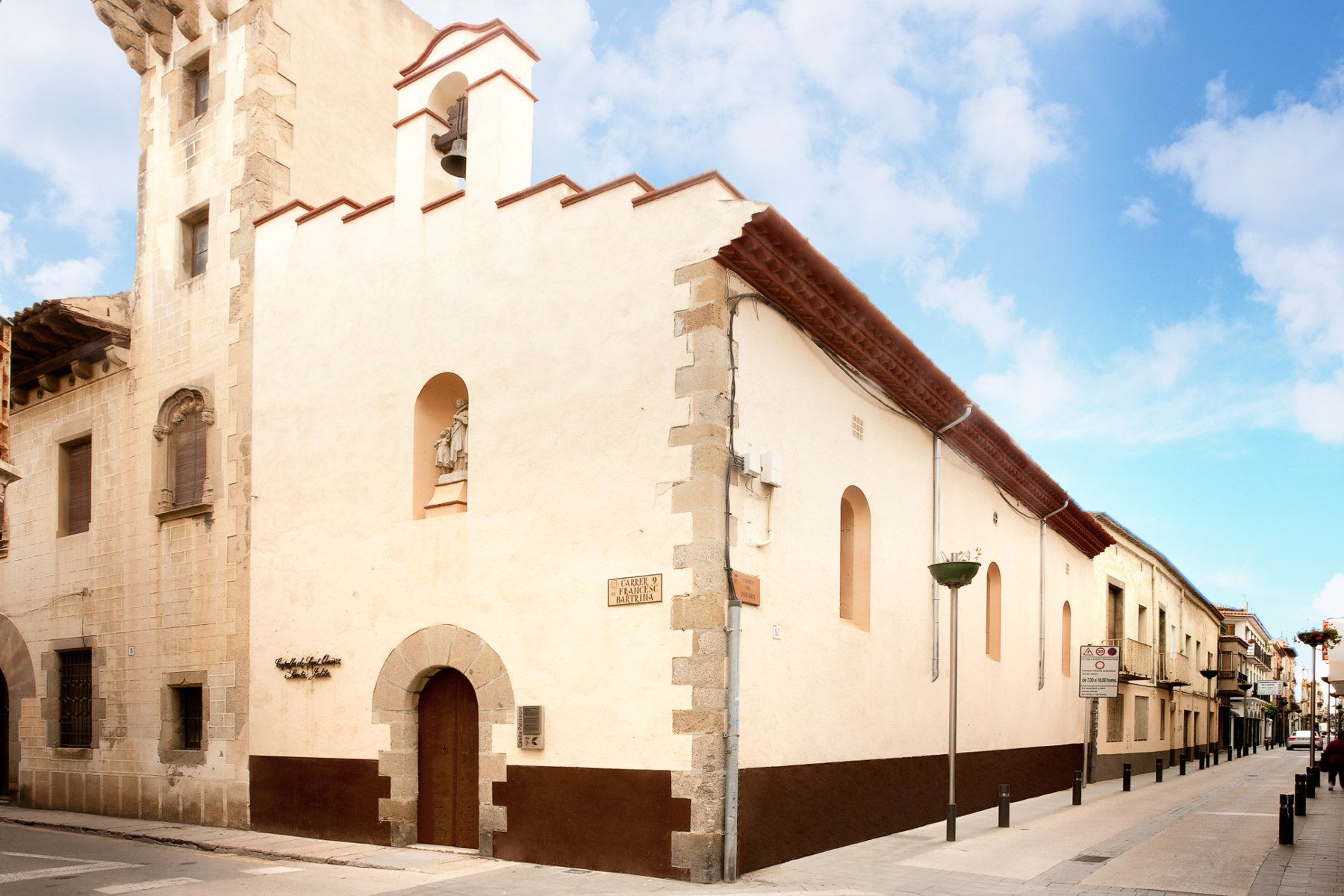
Capella de St Quirze i Sta Julita http://www.calella.cat/adreces-i-telefons/capella-de-sant-quirze-i-santa-julita

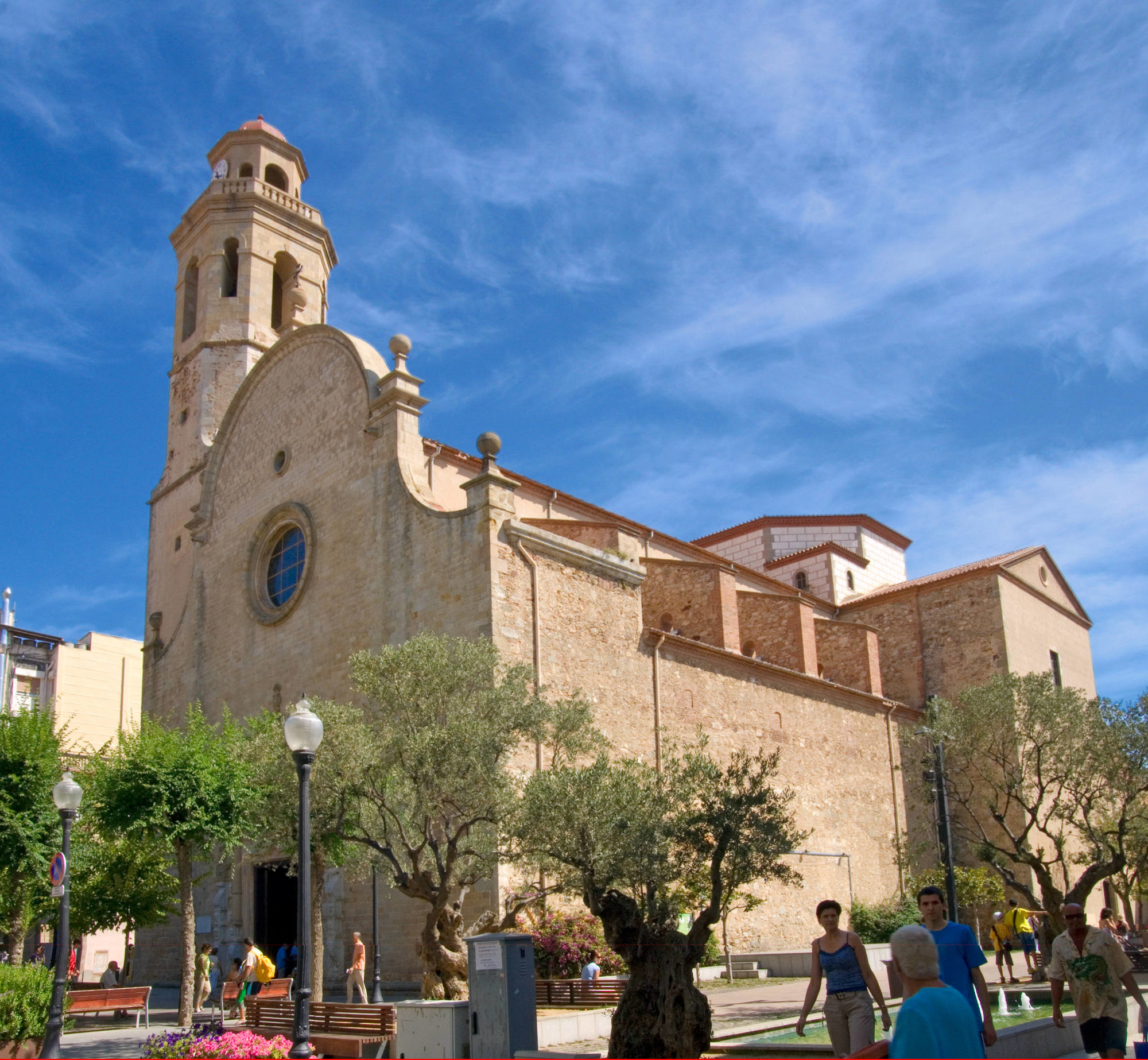
Església Santa Maria i Sant Nicolau

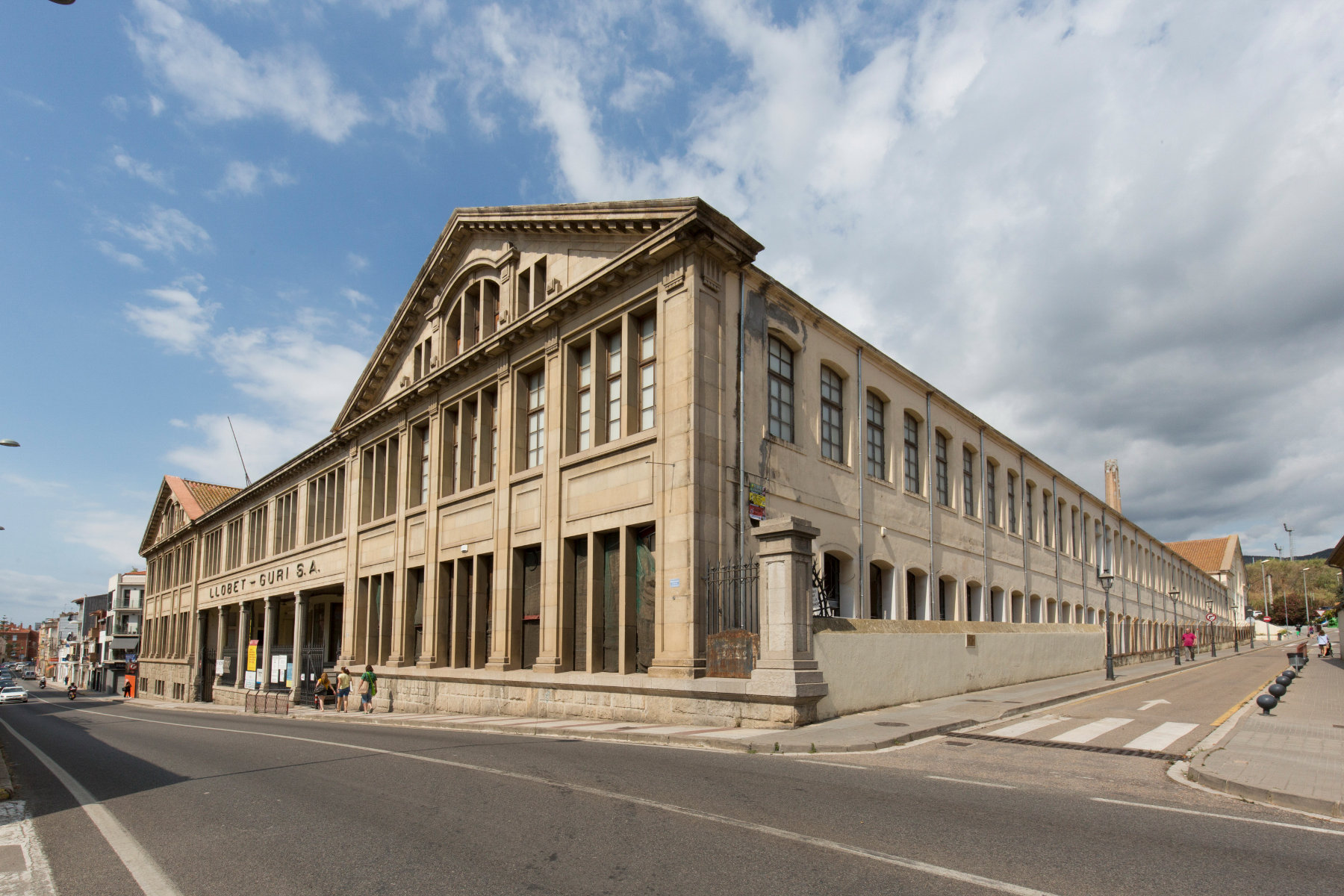
Fabrica Llobet Guri

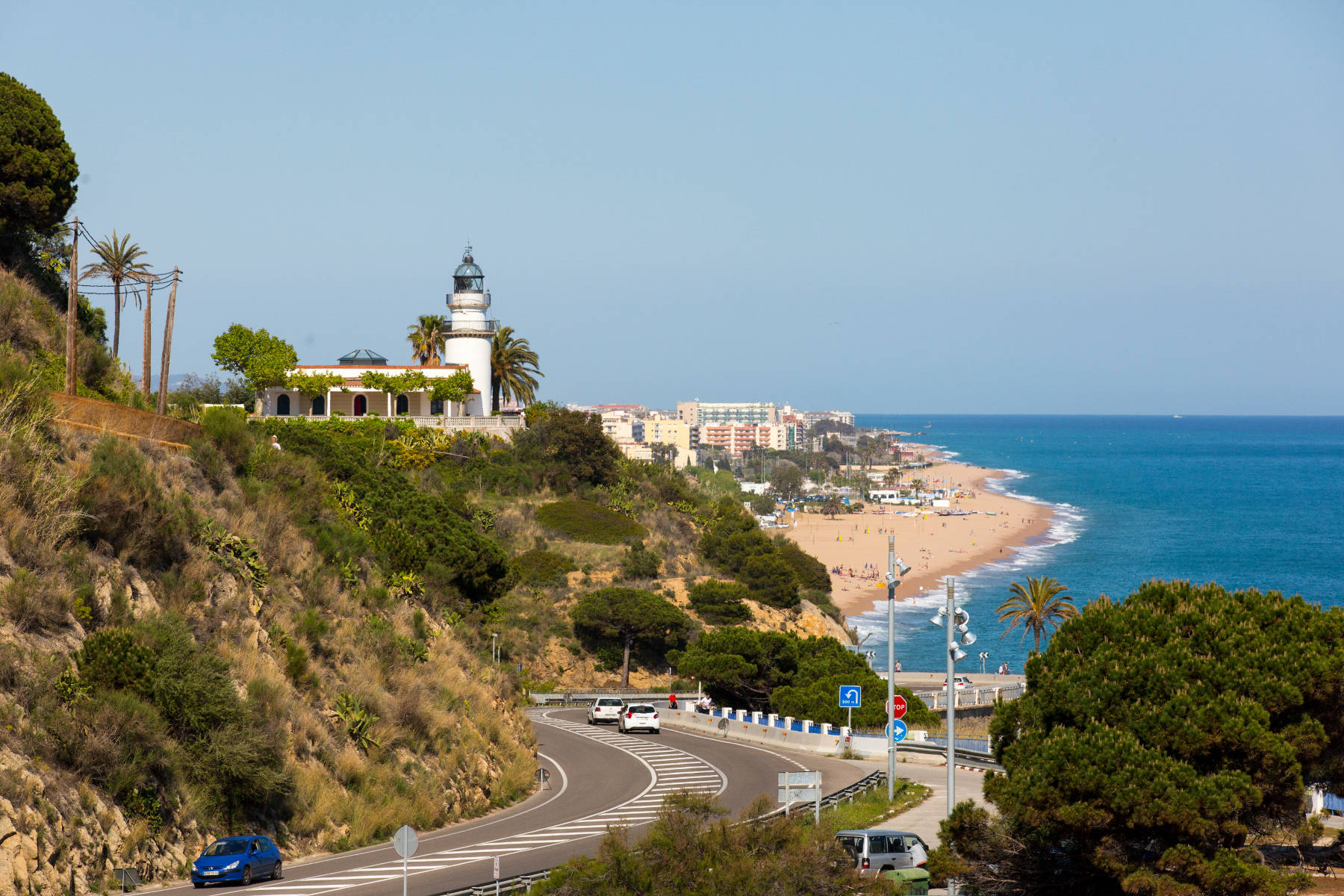
Far de Calella

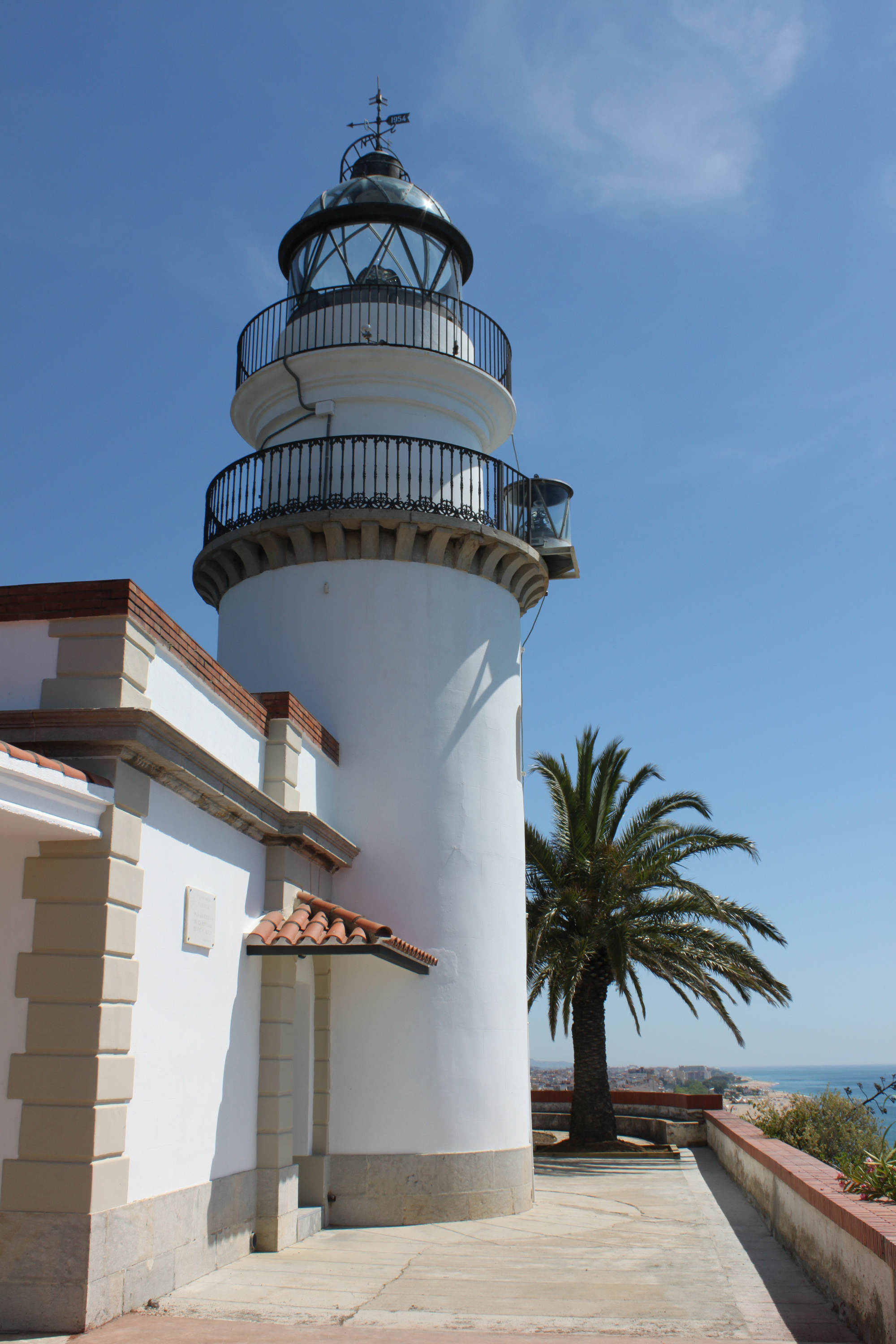
Far de Calella

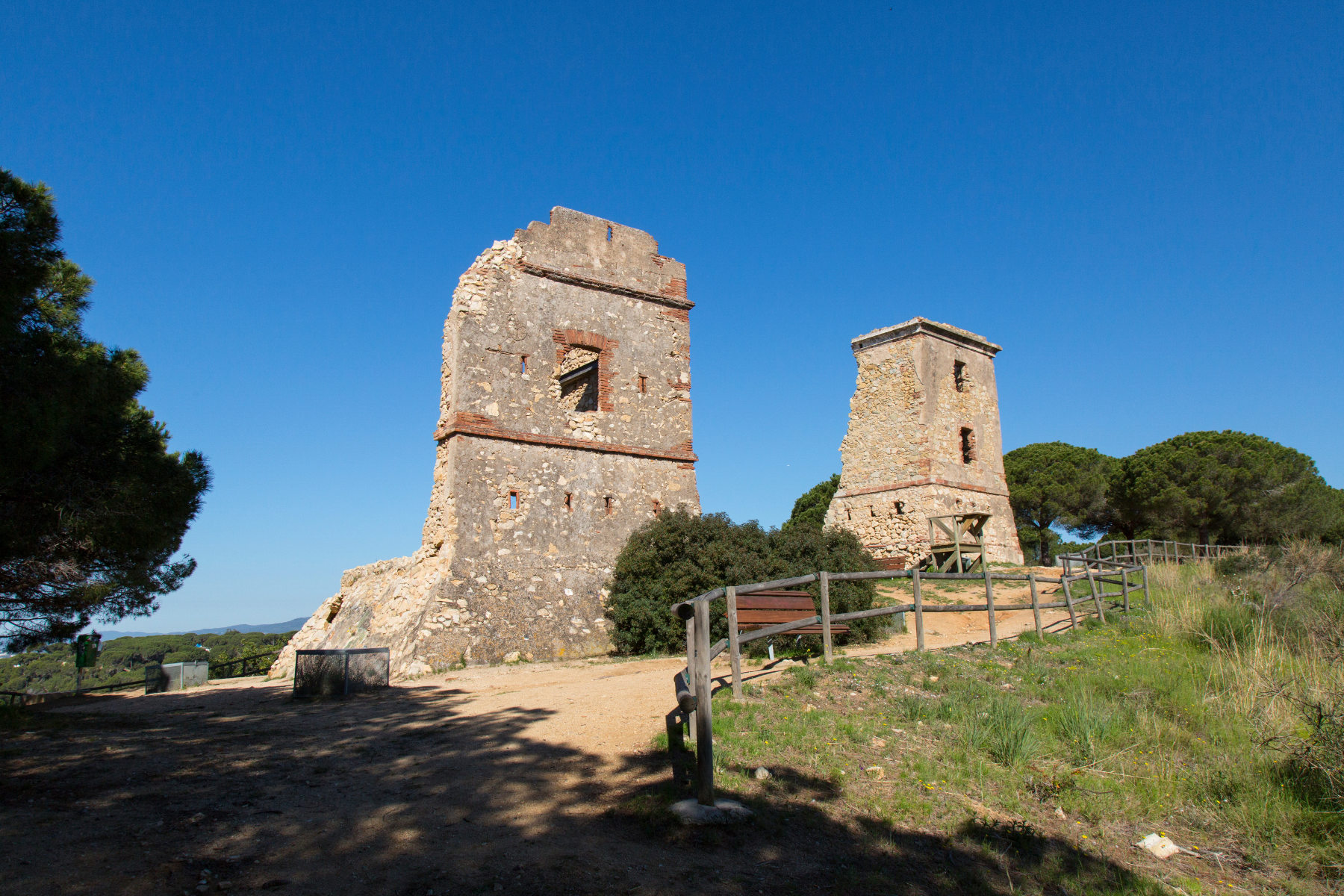
Torretes de Calella

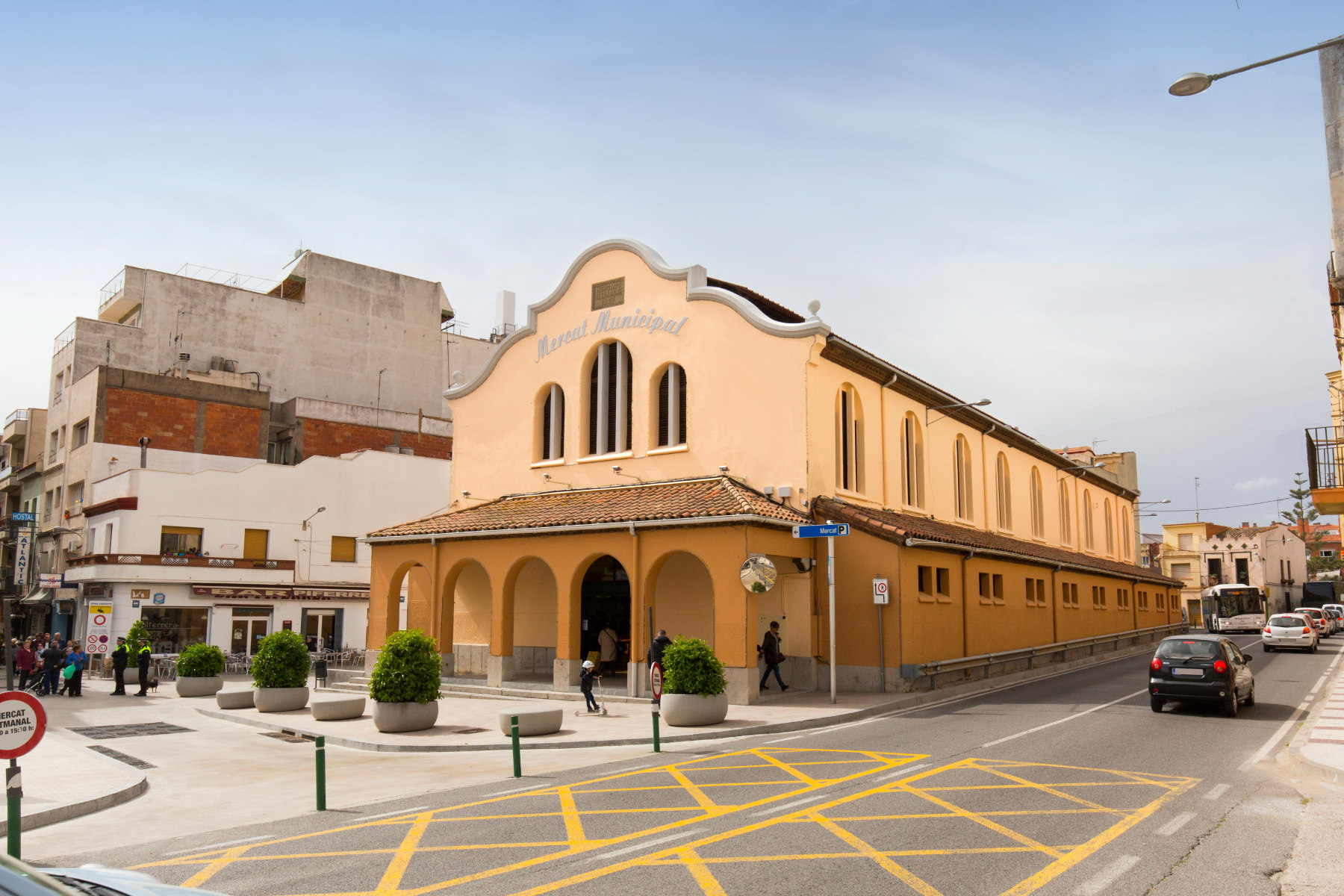
Mercat Municipal

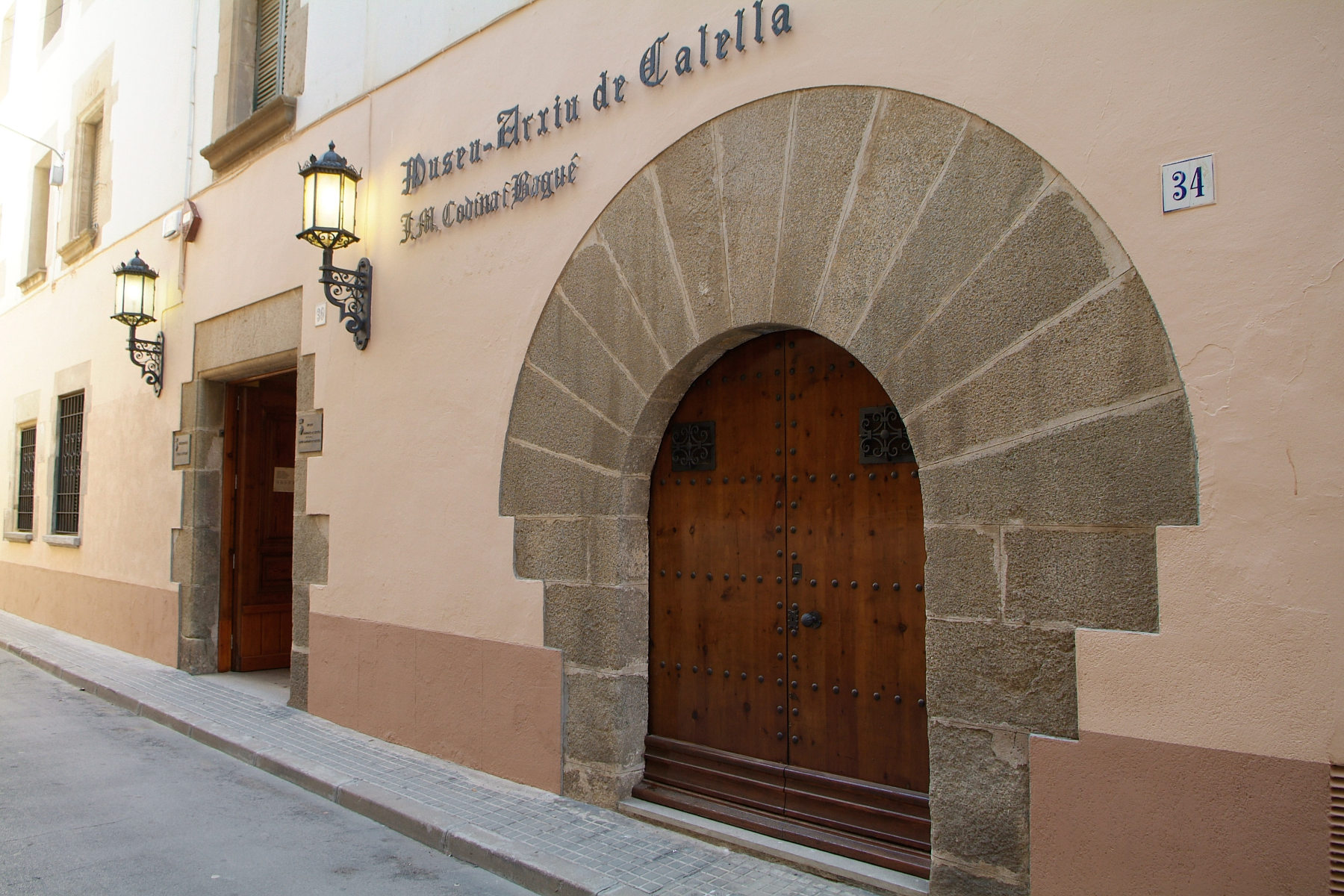
Museu Arxiu Calella

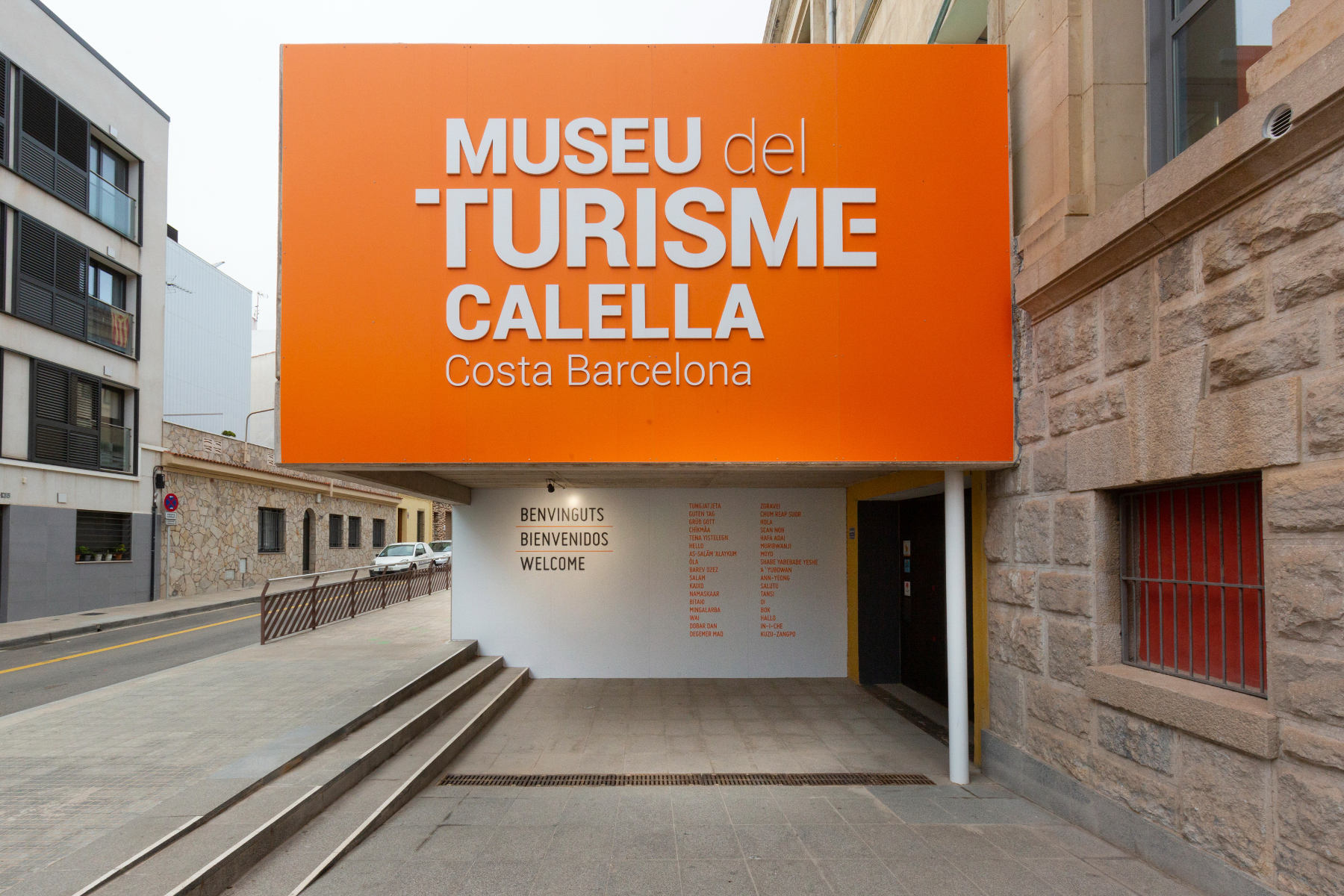
Museu Turisme

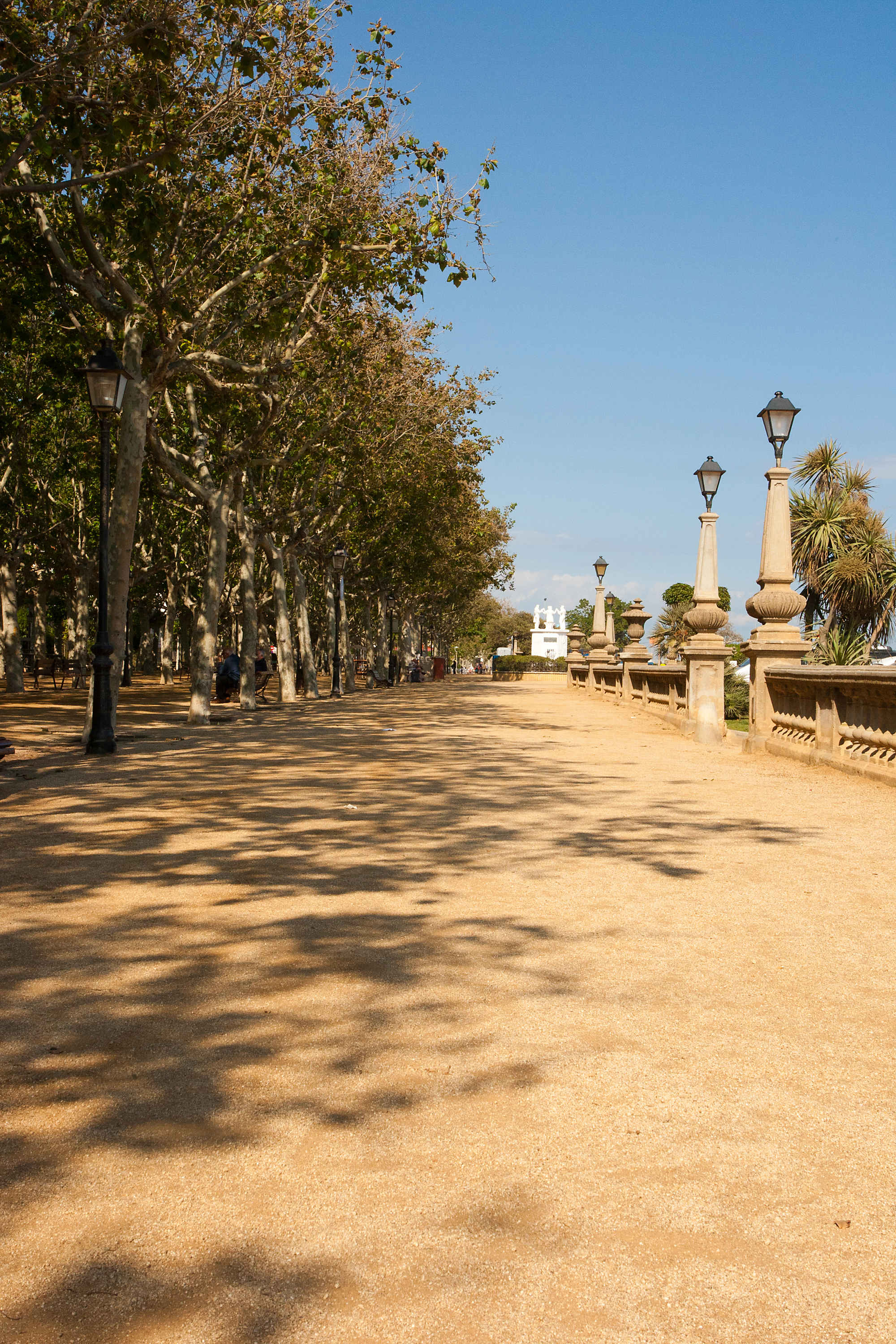
Passeig Manuel Puigvert

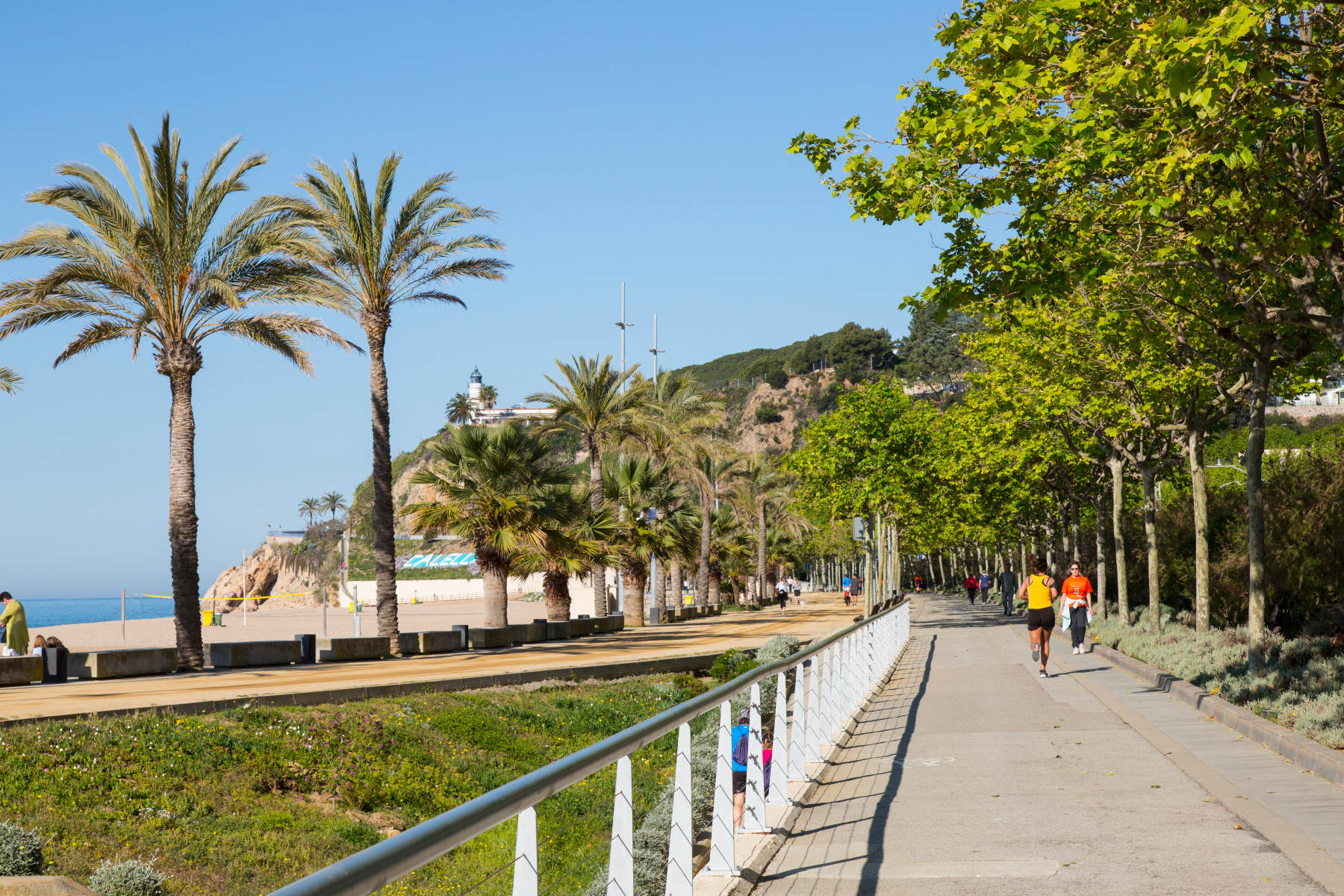
Passeig Garbí

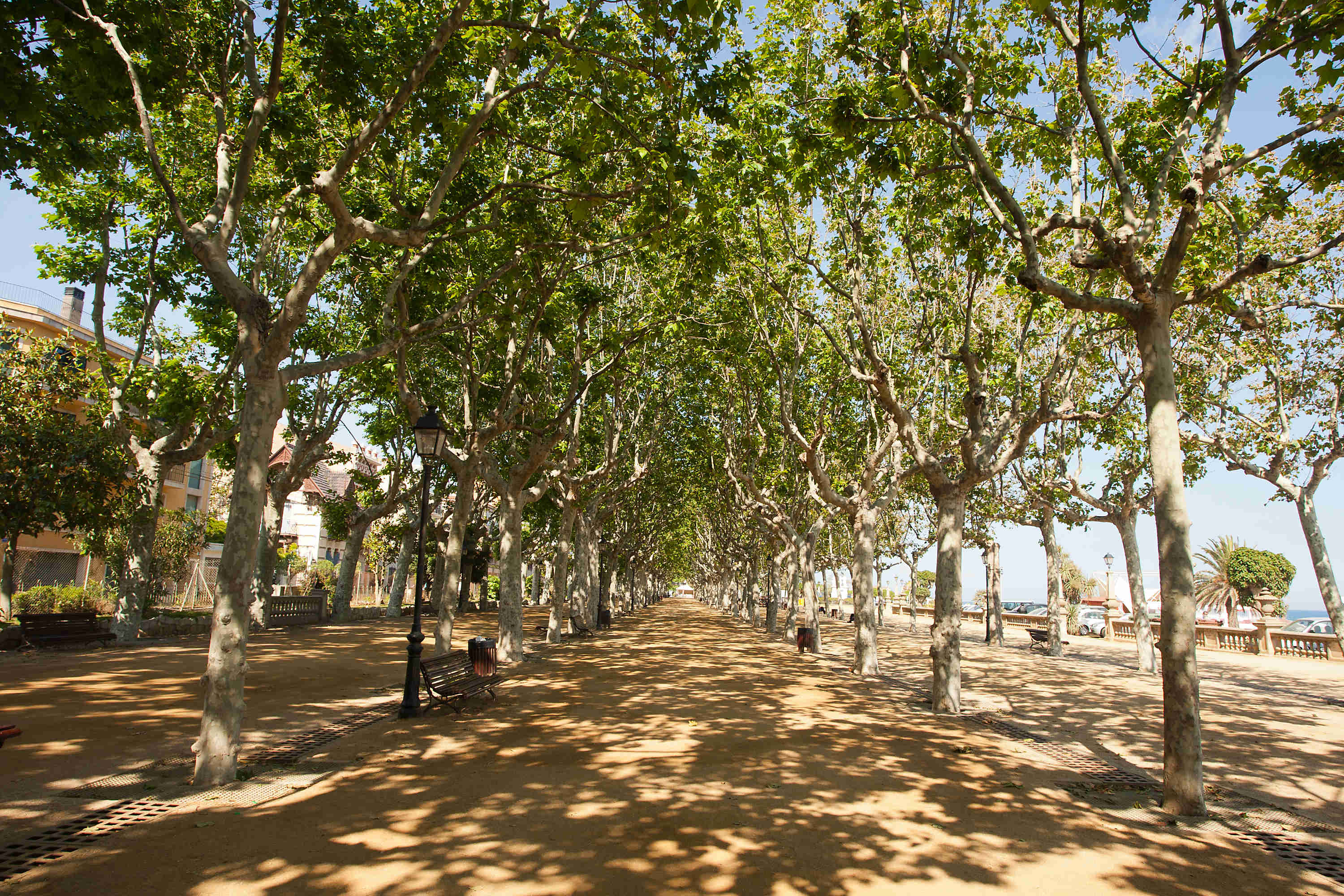
Passeig Manuel Puigvert

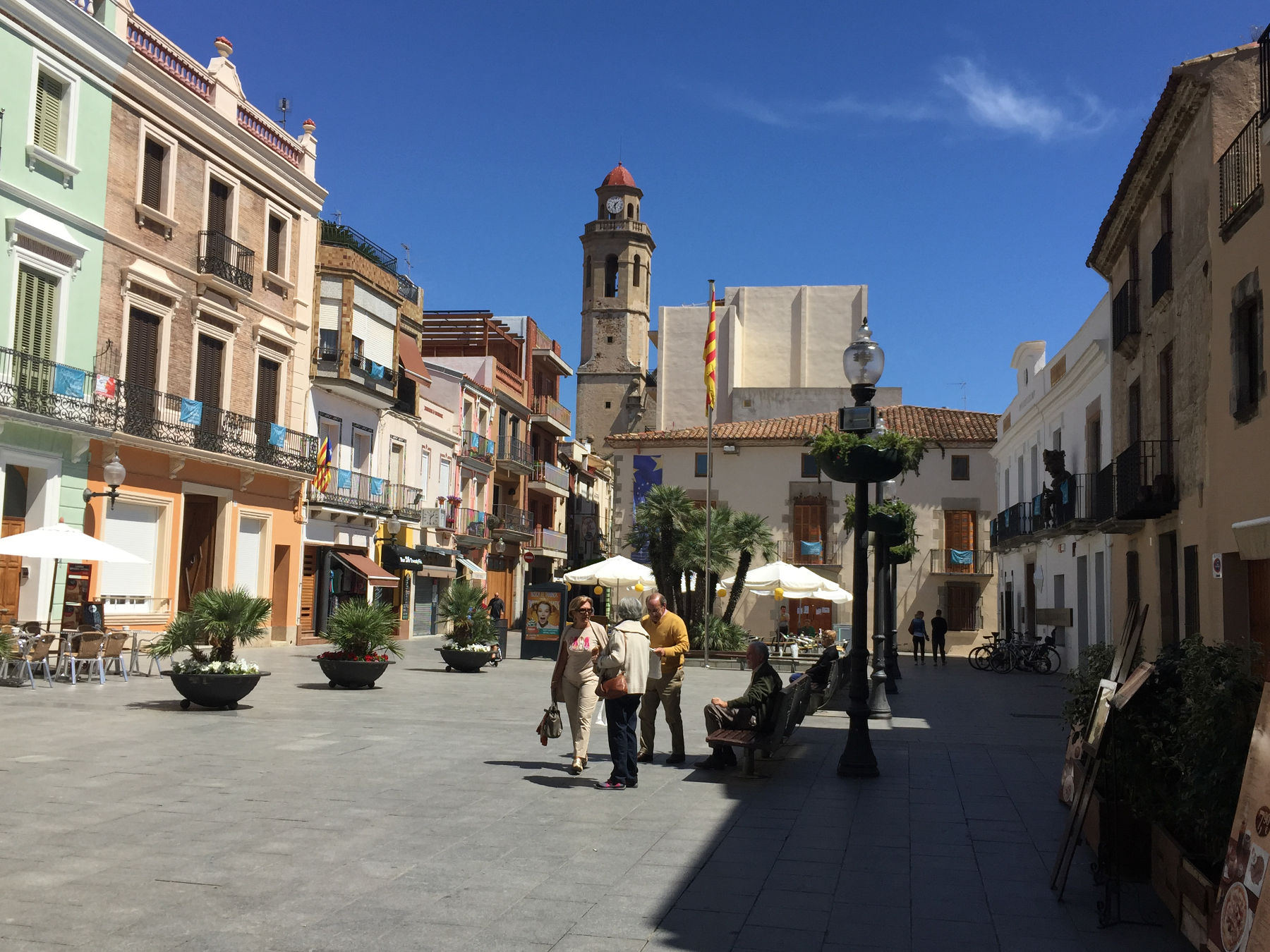
Plaça de l'Ajuntament

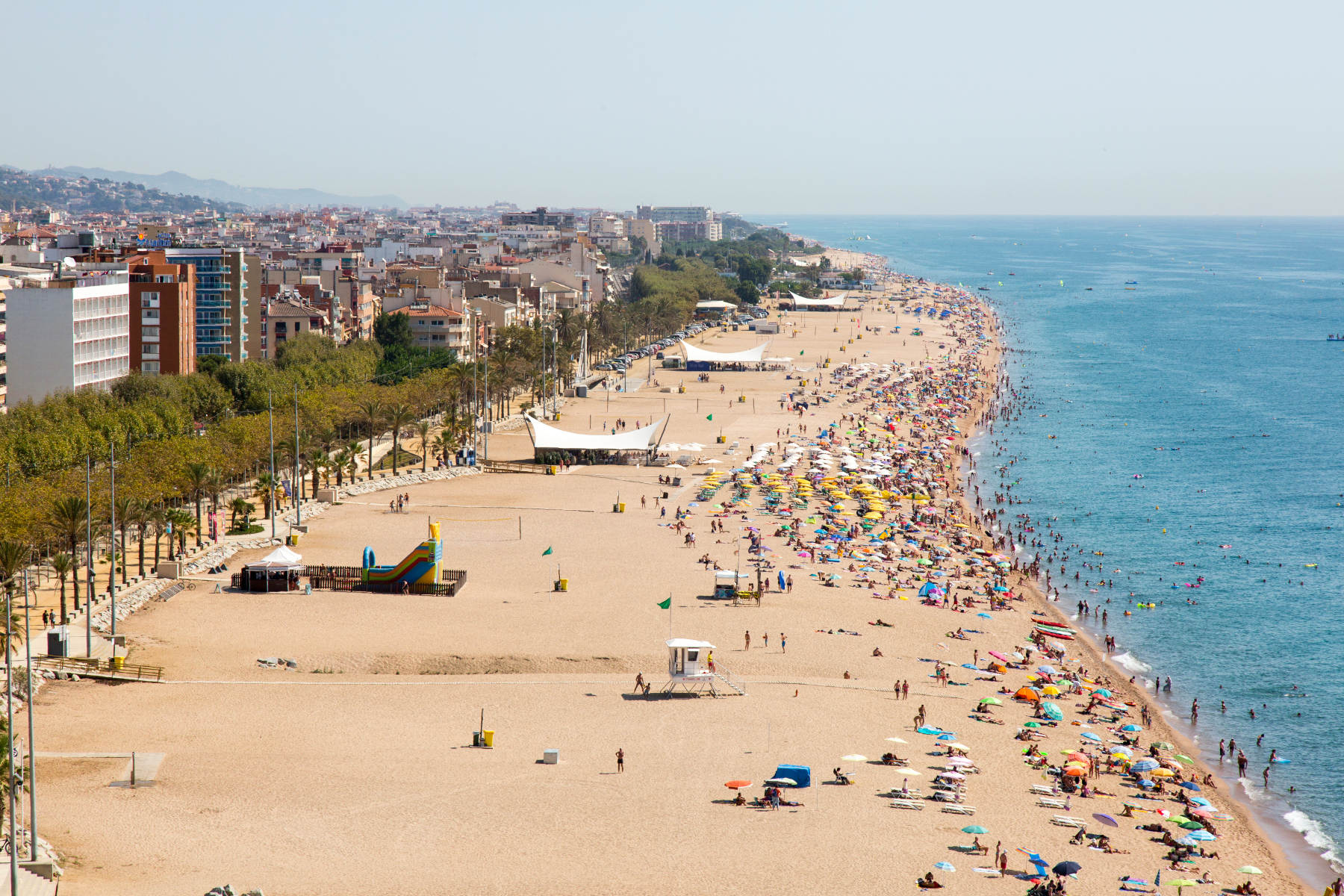
Platja de Calella

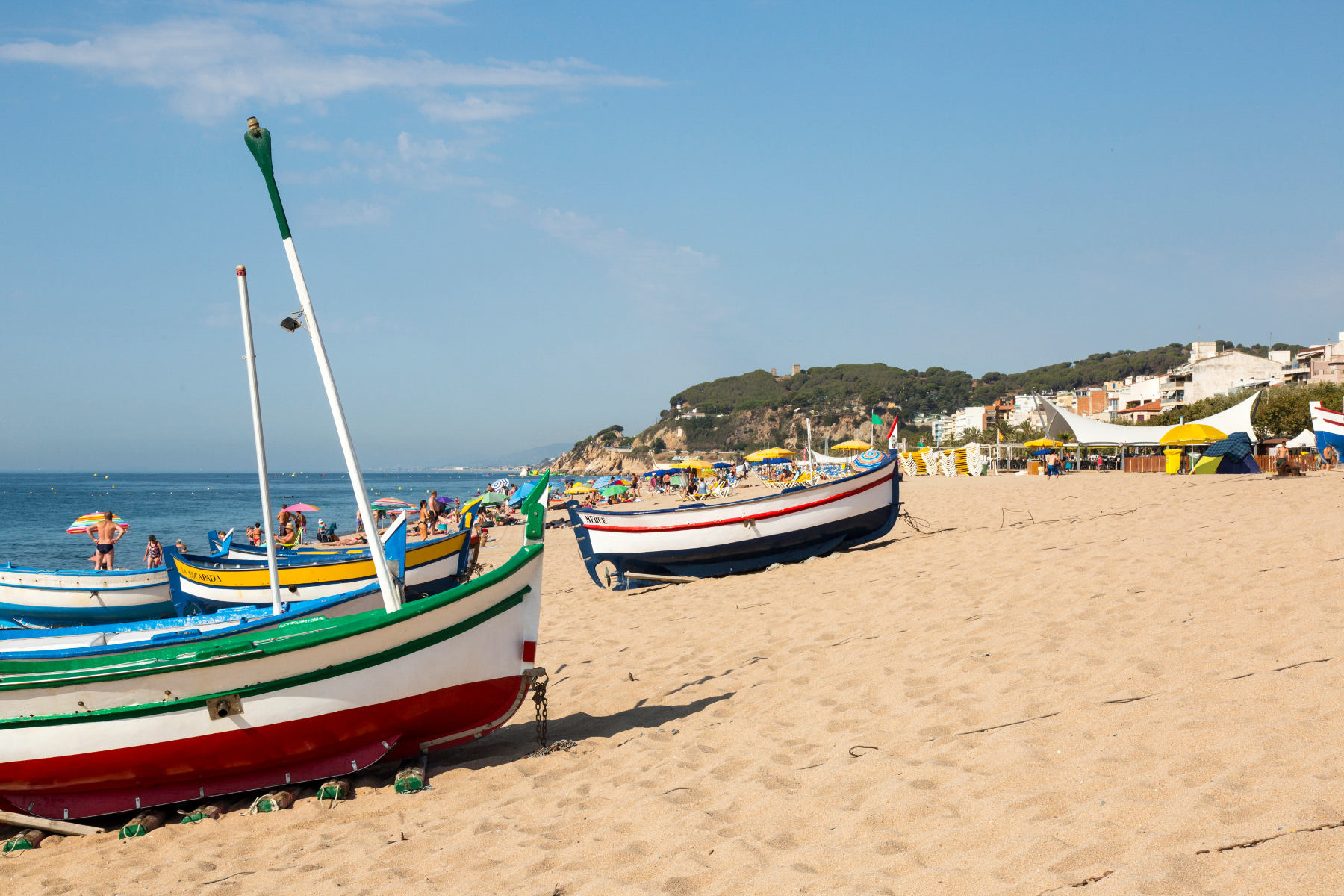
Platja Gran barques

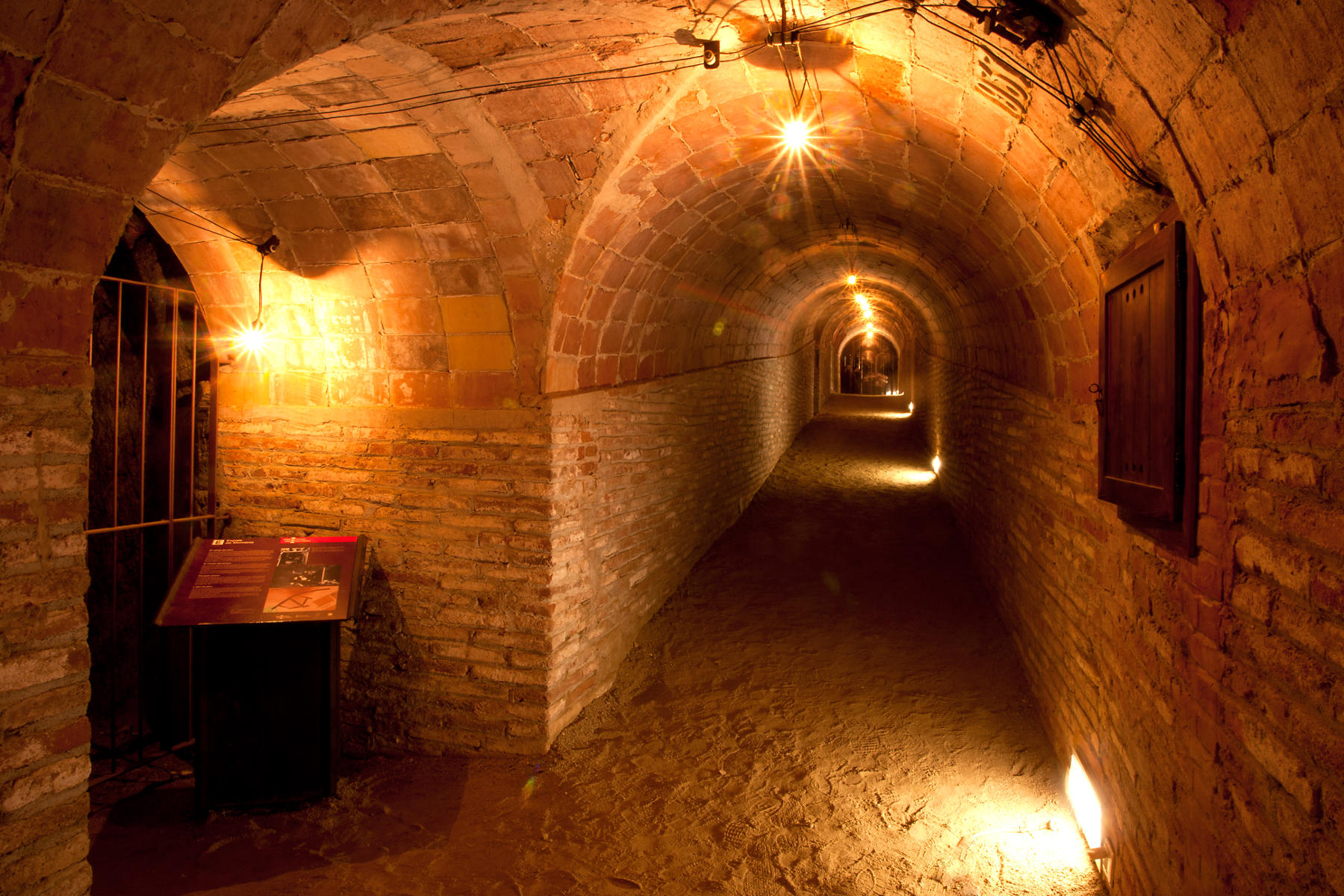
Refugi Antiaeri

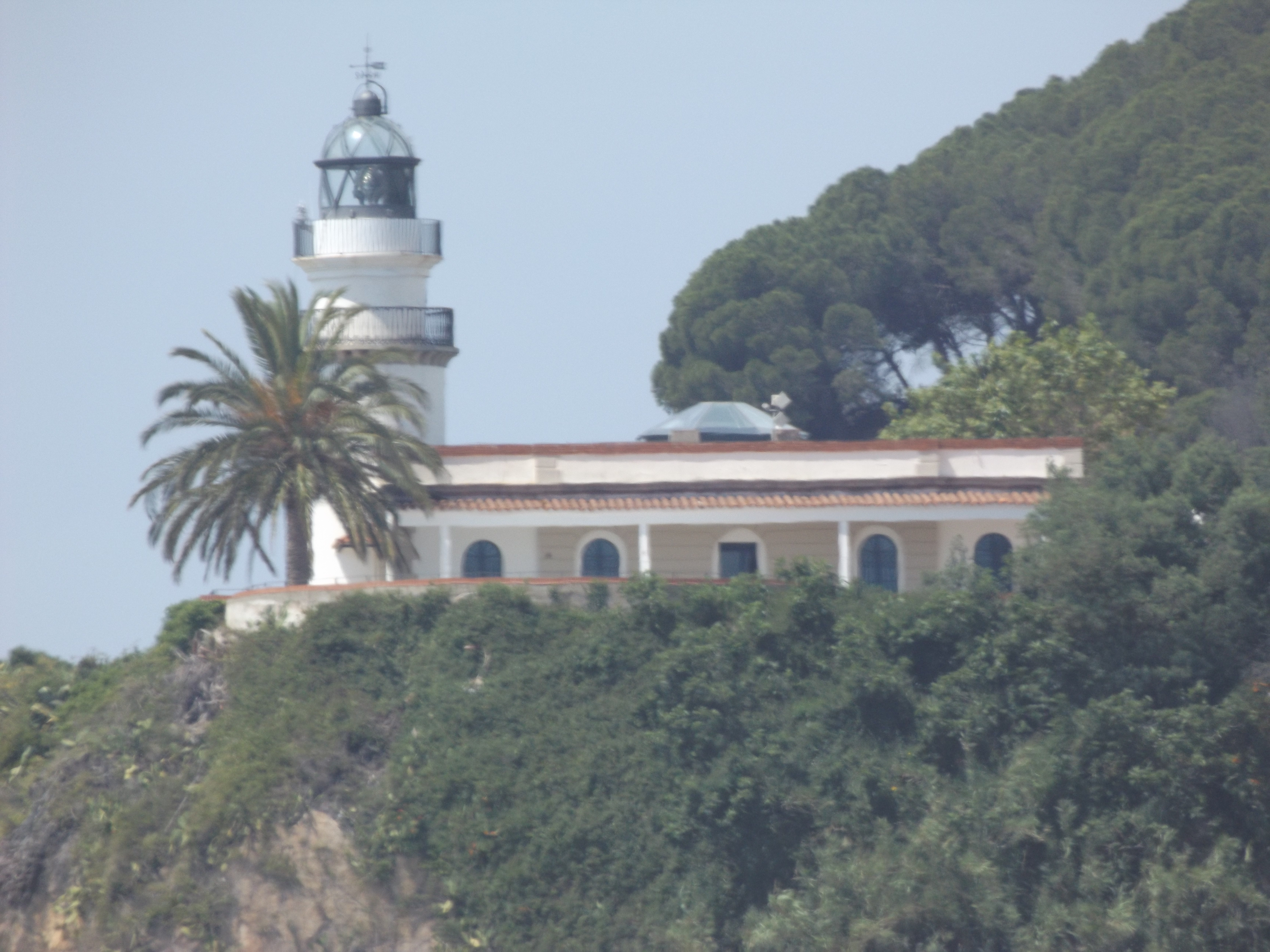
"Spanish Lighthouse Calella"
