= Calella Lighthouse =

Lighthouse in Catalonia, Spain

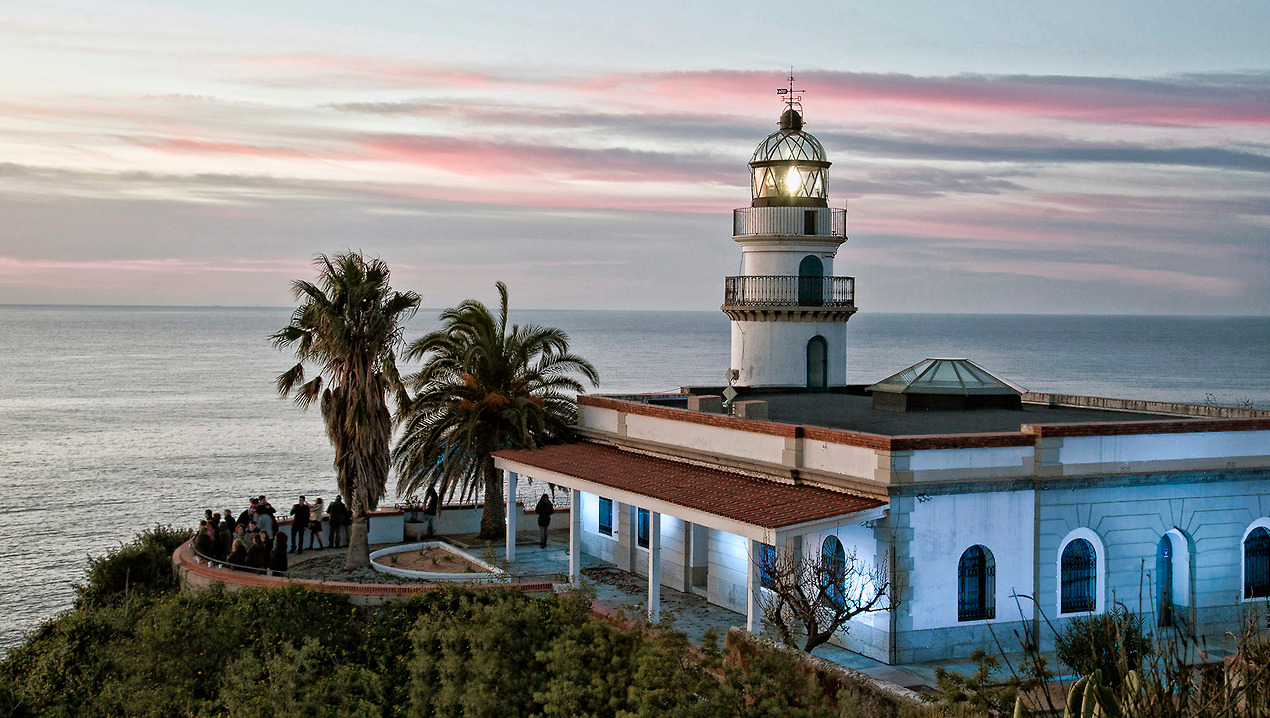
- Location: Calella; Province of Barcelona; Catalonia; Spain
- Coordinates: 41.608107°N 2.646399°E

Tower
- Constructed: 1859
- Construction: masonry tower
- Height: 13 metres (43 ft)
- Shape: cylindrical tower with double balcony and lantern
- Markings: white tower, glass lantern
- Power source: mains electricity
- Operator: Autoridat Portuària de Barcelona
- Heritage: Cultural Asset part of the cultural heritage of Catalonia

Light
- First lit: 1859
- Focal height: 50 metres (160 ft)
- Lens: original 3rd order Fresnel lens
- Range: 18 nmi (33 km)
- Characteristic: Fl (3+2) W 20s.
- Spain no.: ES-30810

The Calella Lighthouse is an active lighthouse situated in the coastal town of Calella in Costa del Maresme, 58 km northeast of Barcelona, in Catalonia, Spain.

Its construction began on 9 October 1856, and the engineer responsible for the project was Marià Parellada. The lighthouse was inaugurated on 15 December 1859. With an elevation of 50 metres (160 ft) above sea level, the light can be seen for 18 nautical miles (33 km). In the beginning, the lamp used oil, then later on, paraffin and petrol was used. Electricity was then introduced in the Lighthouse in 1927.

== See also ==
- List of lighthouses in Spain
