= Costa del Maresme =

Coastal area in northern Catalonia

- Beach and coast
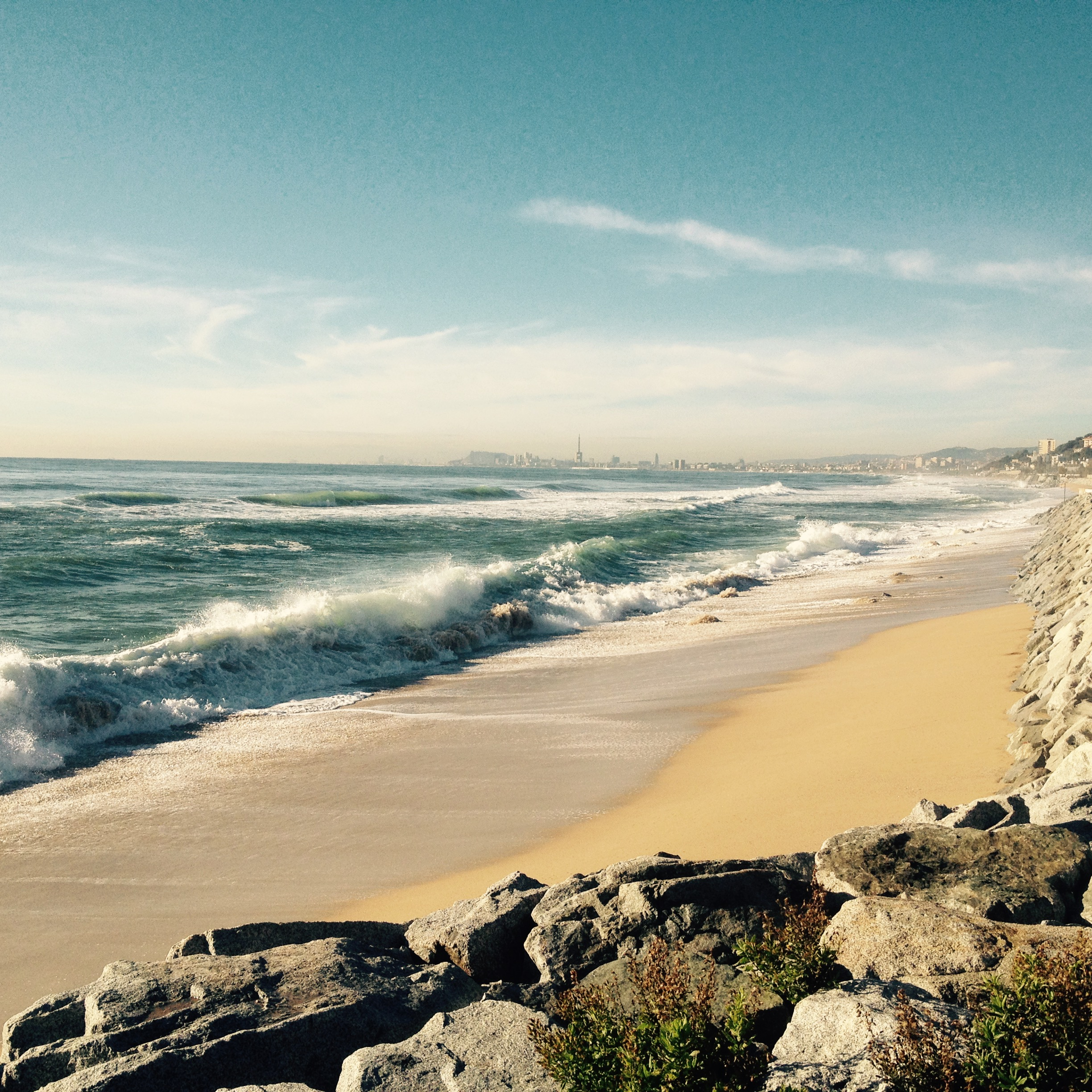
- Interactive map of Costa del Maresme

Dimensions
  - Length: 55 km (34 mi)

The Costa del Maresme is a section of the Catalan coast that coincides with the coast of the Maresme region and covers a total of sixteen municipalities from Montgat to the mouth of the Tordera (Malgrat de Mar). It is bordered on the north by the Costa Brava and on the south by the Costa de Barcelona.

The Costa del Maresme stretches between the Mediterranean Sea and the Catalan Coastal Range, which protects it from the north winds. The Costa del Maresme has extensive beaches, fishing villages and towns with a long history of tourism. Characterized by its mild climate and its Mediterranean landscape, it is a residential and tourist area that in recent decades has hosted many people from cities who have moved their first residence to the coast.

The region has five marinas and fishing activity is mainly concentrated in and around Arenys de Mar. For this reason, Arenys and Sant Pol de Mar have been distinguished as fishing villages by the Catalan Tourism Agency.

== Beaches of the Maresme ==
The Costa del Maresme has a total of 54 beaches and caves that add up to a length of 55 km (34 mi), most of them with medium and coarse sand.

They range from urban beaches - with all kinds of services like restaurants, bars and casinos - to more natural beaches far away from urban centers. Some have been awarded the Blue Flag, others have been recognized as having a commitment to sustainability Biosphere and others certified with the Q for Tourist Quality. Some locations have also been certified as Family Beach destinations and offer facilities and services specially designed for family guests.

From southwest to northeast, they are:

Legend: (N) = Nude / = Blue Flag Beach / Q = Tourist Quality / BCE = Biosphere Committed Entity
Municipality	Name in Catalan	Name in English	Length	Notes (2019)	Pictures
Montgat	(Cala Taps)	Taps Cove	260 m		
Montgat	Platja de les Roques	The Rocks Beach	274 m		
Montgat	Platja de les Barques	The Boats Beach	500 m		
Montgat	Platge de Can Tano	Can Tano Beach	90 m		
Montgat	Platja de Monsolís	Monsolís Beach	660 m		
Montgat	Platja dels Toldos	Toldos Beach	383 m		
El Masnou	Platja del Masnou	Masnou Beach	1240m		
El Masnou	Platja d'Ocata (N)	Ocata Beach (N)	2240m		
Premià de Mar	Platja de Ponent i de la Descàrrega	Ponent and Descàrrega Beach	690m		
Premià de Mar	Platja de Pla de l’Os i Bellamar	Pla de l'Os and Bellamar Beach	860m		
Premià de Mar	Platja de Llevant	Llevant Beach	595m		
Vilassar de Mar	Platja de Ponent	Ponent Beach	1160m		
Vilassar de Mar	Platja de l’Astillero	Astillero Beach	960m		
Vilassar de Mar	Platja de l’Almadrava	Almadrava Beach	290m		
Cabrera de Mar	Platja dels Vinyals	Vinyals Beach	600m		
Cabrera de Mar	Platja del Molí	Molí Beach	500m		
Cabrera de Mar	Platja de Santa Margarida	Santa Margarida Beach	200m		
Mataró	Platja de Ponent	Ponent Beach	180m		
Mataró	Platja del Varador	Varador Beach	765m	Q	
Mataró	Platja del Callao	Callao Beach	400m	Q	
Mataró	Platja de Sant Simó	Sant Simó Beach	1000m		
Sant Andreu de Llavaneres	Platja de l’Estació	Beach of the Train Station	200m	BCE	
Sant Andreu de Llavaneres	Platja de les Barques	Boats Beach	180m	BCE	
Sant Andreu de Llavaneres	Platja del Balís	Balís Beach	50m	BCE	
Sant Vicenç de Montalt	Platja Sant Vicenç de Montalt	Sant Vicenç de Montalt Beach	1237m	BCE	
Caldes d’Estrac	Platja dels Tres Micos	Three Monkeys Beach	400m		
Caldes d’Estrac	Platja Kalima	Kalima Beach	300m		
Arenys de Mar	Platja de la Musclera (N)	Musclera Beach (N)	630m		
Arenys de Mar	Platja de la Picòrdia	Picòrdia Beach	580m		
Arenys de Mar	Platja del Cavaió	Cavaió Beach	1000m		
Canet de Mar	Platja del Cavaió	Cavaió Beach	600m		
Canet de Mar	Platja de Canet	Canet Beach	1500m		
Sant Pol de Mar	Platja de les Roques Blanques	White Rocks Beach	380m		
Sant Pol de Mar	Platja de la Murtra	Murtra Beach	500m		
Sant Pol de Mar	Platja de Can Villar	Can Villar Beach	700m		
Sant Pol de Mar	Platja de Sant Pol	Sant Pol Beach	400m		
Sant Pol de Mar	Platja de les Barques	The Boats Beach	150m		
Sant Pol de Mar	Plata les Escaletes	The Stairs Beach	300m		
Sant Pol de Mar	Platja la Platjola	Platjola Beach	130m		
Sant Pol de Mar	Platja del Morer	Morer Beach	750m		
Calella	Platja de les Roques (N)	The Rocks Beach (N)	736m	BCE	
Calella	Platja de Garbí	Garbí Beach	752m	/ Q / BCE	
Calella	Platja Gran	The Big Beach	1388m	BCE	
Pineda de Mar	Platja Poblenou	Poblenou Beach	634m		
Pineda de Mar	Platja de la Riera	Creek Beach	577m	/ BCE	
Pineda de Mar	Platja dels Pescadors	Beach of the Fishers	1082m	/ BCE	
Pineda de Mar	Platja dels Pins (N)	Pinecone Beach (N)	527m		
Santa Susanna	Platja de les Dunes (N)	Dunes Beach (N)	1000m		
Santa Susanna	Platja de les Caletes	Caletes Beach	400m		
Santa Susanna	Platja de Llevant	Llevant Beach	800m	BCE	
Malgrat de Mar	Platja de l’Astillero	Astillero Beach	1000m		
Malgrat de Mar	Platja Malgrat Centre	The Centre of Malgrat Beach	900m		
Malgrat de Mar	Platja de la Conca	Conca Beach	1700m		
Malgrat de Mar	Platja de la Punta de la Tordera (N)	Mouth of the Tordera Beach (N)	900m		

== Marinas ==
There are a total of five ports along the cost with most of them of being meant for sporting.

From southwest to northeast, they are:

Port	Usage	Docks	Photo
Port del Masnou	Sporting	1058	
Marina Port Premià	Sporting	554	
Port de Mataró	Sporting	1080	
Port Balís (Sant Andreu de Llavaneres)	Sporting	764	
Port d'Arenys	Sporting and Fishing	428	
