= Montserrat Candini =

Spanish politician (1957–2024)

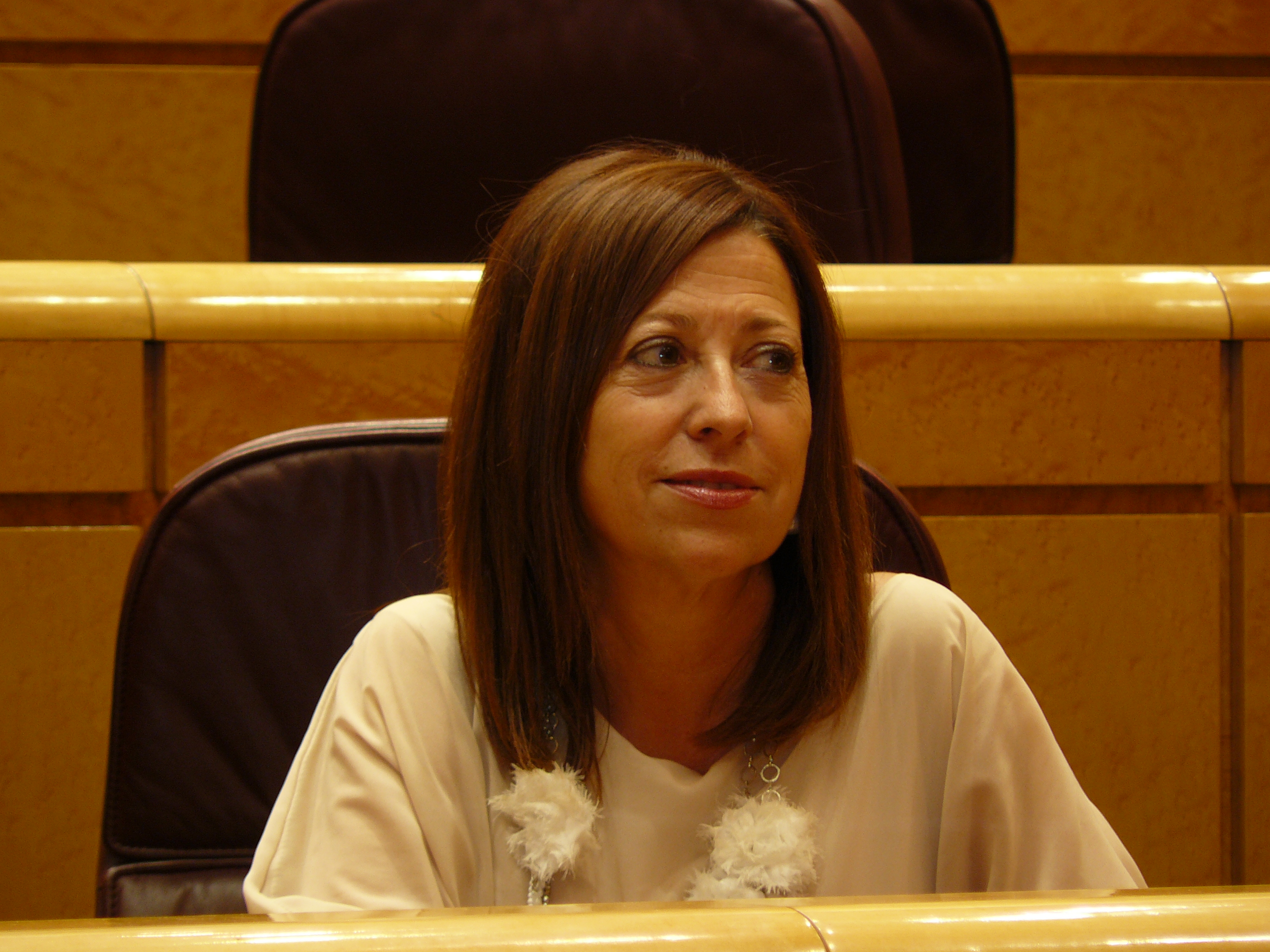
Candini in 2012

Montserrat Candini i Puig (4 September 1957 – 19 July 2024) was a Spanish politician of the Democratic Convergence of Catalonia and the Catalan European Democratic Party. She was the mayor of Calella (2011–2022), a member of the Senate of Spain (2008–2015) and of the Parliament of Catalonia (2015–2017).

== Biography ==
Born in Barcelona, Candini studied journalism and a postgraduate course in political sciences at the University of Barcelona. She was by profession a civil servant in the Generalitat de Catalunya and was married and had a daughter.

In 1996, Candini became chief of cabinet to the Catalan Minister of Agriculture. In 2003, she was elected to the city council in Calella as number two on the Convergence and Union (CiU) list. After two terms in opposition, she was the first woman elected mayor of Calella in 2011. She stood down temporarily in November 2021 and permanently in May 2022 due to cancer.

In tandem with her municipal offices, Candini was a member of the Senate of Spain from 2008 to 2015, and of the Parliament of Catalonia from 2015 to 2017. She was 27th on the Junts pel Sí (JxS) list in the Barcelona constituency in the 2015 Catalan regional election, and was elected as the list won 32 deputies.
