= Violant de Prades de Gandia =

Spanish noblewoman

Violant de Prades de Gandia (1395–1471), was a Catalan noblewoman.

She was born to the noble Jaume de Prades and Violant de Gandia, and married viscount Bernat Joan, viscount de Cabrera and count de Mòdica. She often managed the fief during the absence of her spouse. In 1461, her spouse participated in the capture of Charles, Prince of Viana, but in the Catalan Civil War, he sided with the rebels against John II of Aragon and Navarre. Violant, however, sided with John II, for which she has in history traditionally been given a bad name. When her spouse was captured by the king, she was able to act as a mediator and eventually facilitate his release. She also fought for the property of her spouse not being confiscated, though she failed in this regard.
