= Pou de glaç, Canyamars =

Coordinates: 41.6040°N 2.4547°E

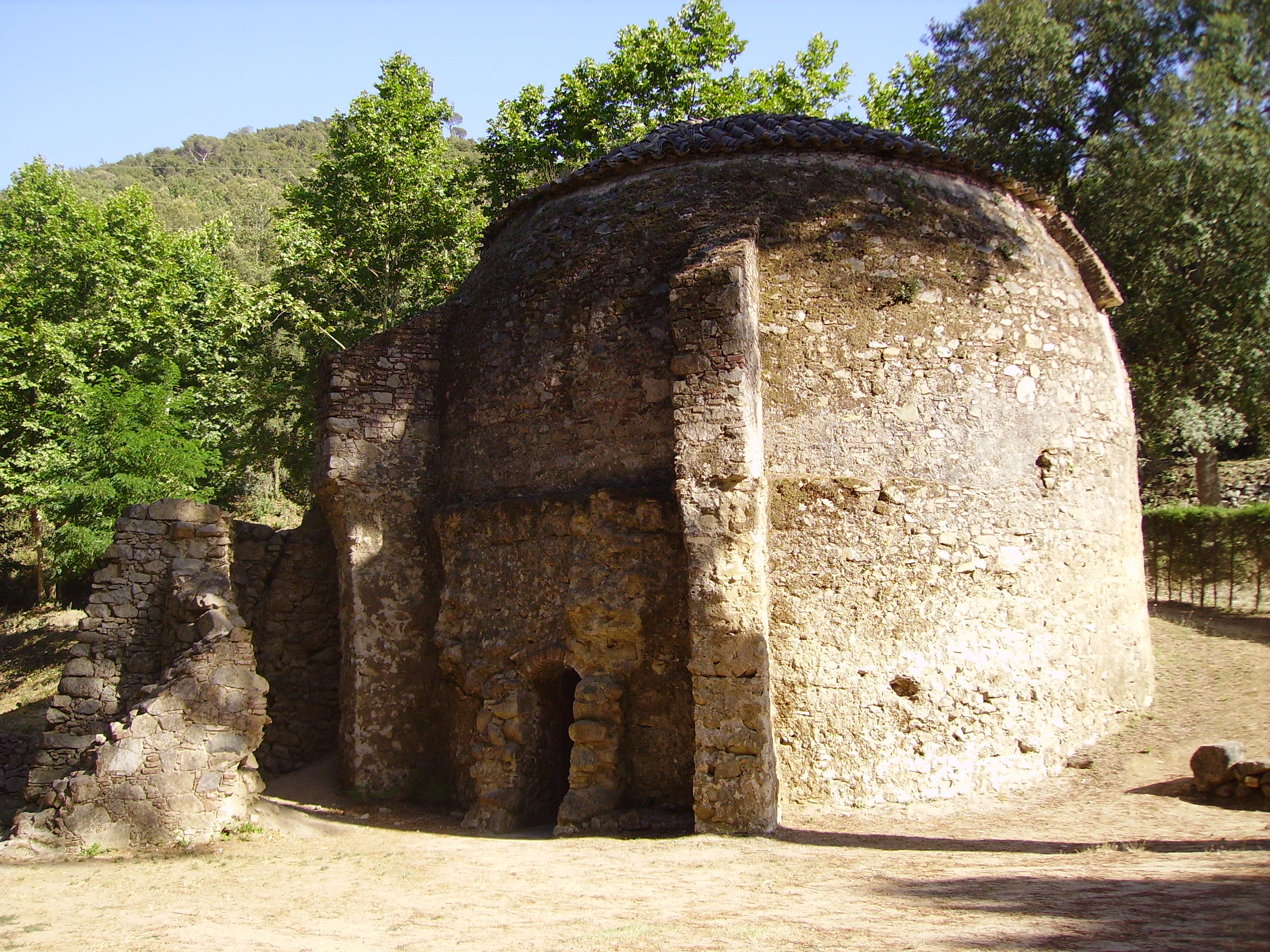
Pou de Glaç (Ice well)

The Pou de Glaç (Ice well) is situated on the outskirts of Canyamars within the municipality of Dosrius, Catalonia, Spain. It was used to store ice transported from the Pyrenees during the winter. This was then made available to the local inhabitants during the summer. The Pou de Glaç was recently bought by the Ayuntamiento de Dosrius.
