= Santuari del Corredor =

16th-century hermitage in Dosrius, Spain

Coordinates: 41°37′35″N 2°28′48″E

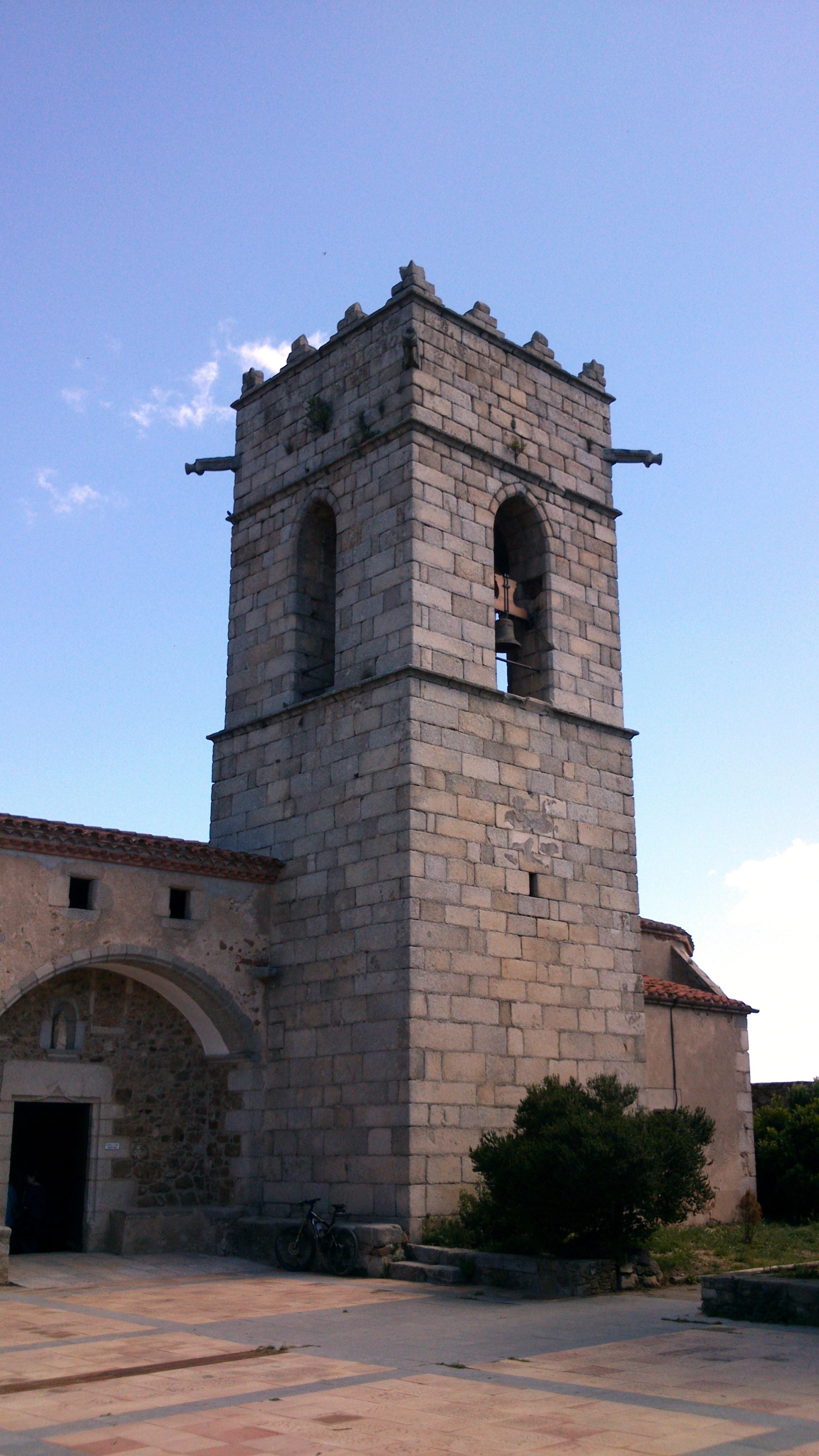
Santuari del Corredor.

The Santuari del Corredor (Shrine of the Corredor) is a 16th-century hermitage within the municipality of Dosrius, Spain. The building is dedicated to the Blessed Virgin, but takes its name from the Corredor hills in the Natural Park of El Montnegre i el Corredor.

It is the annual destination of inhabitants of Canyamars who every May Day go there to celebrate the ending of an Influenza epidemic in the village in the 17th century.
