= Canyamars =

Villages in Catalonia, Spain

Coordinates: 41°36′5.36″N 2°26′29.51″E

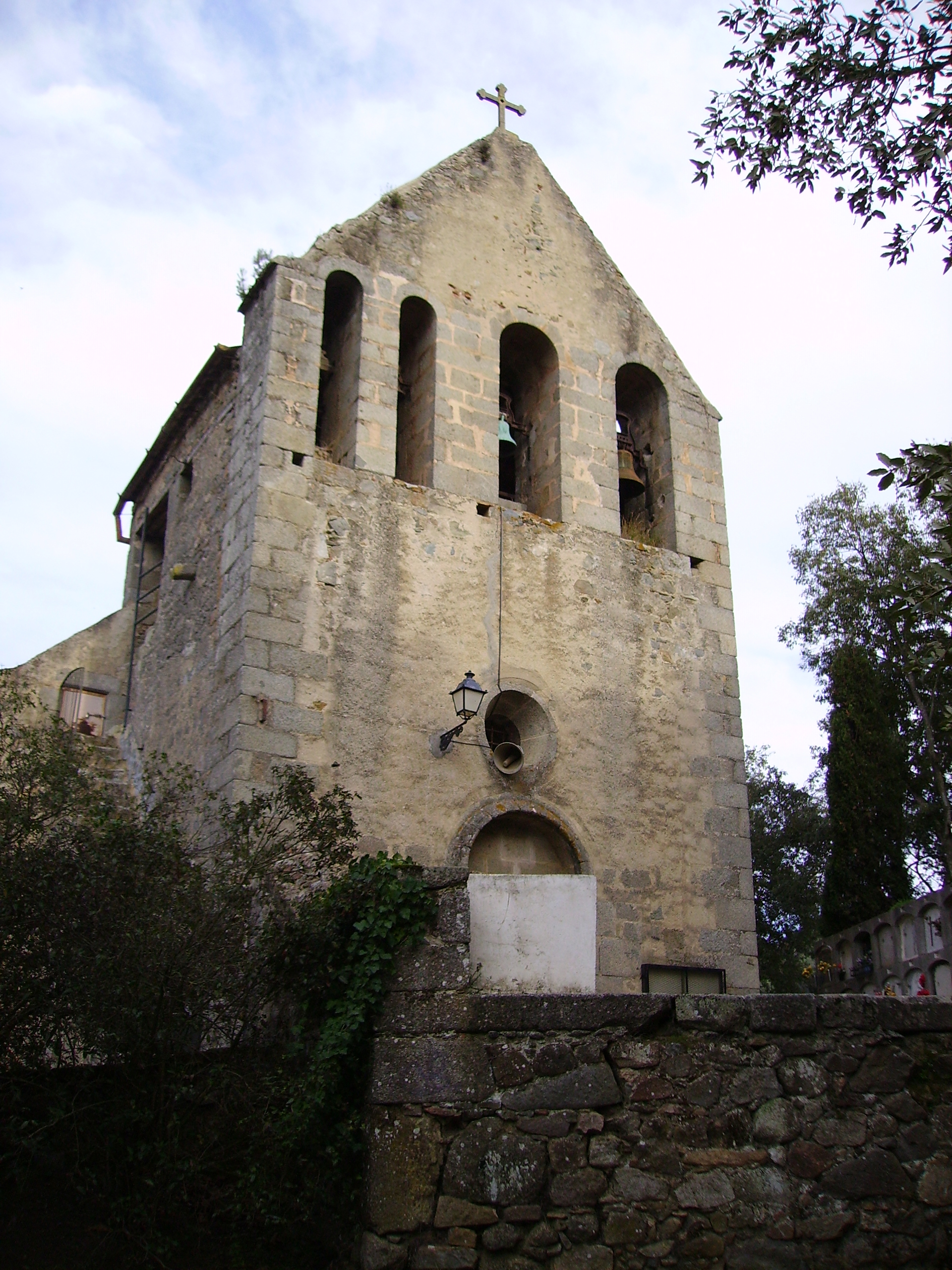
Church of Sant Esteve, Canyamars

Canyamars is one of the three villages that comprise the municipality of Dosrius, in the comarca of Maresme, Catalonia, Spain. It is situated in the base of the valley between the mountains of Corredor and Montalt.

== Places of interest ==
- Esglèsia de Sant Esteve, (Church of Saint Steven)
- Santuari del Corredor (16th-century hermitage)
- Megalithic dolmen in Ca l'Arenes
- Pau de glaç (Ice Well), a semi-subterranean ice house on the outskirts of Canyamars.

== Images ==
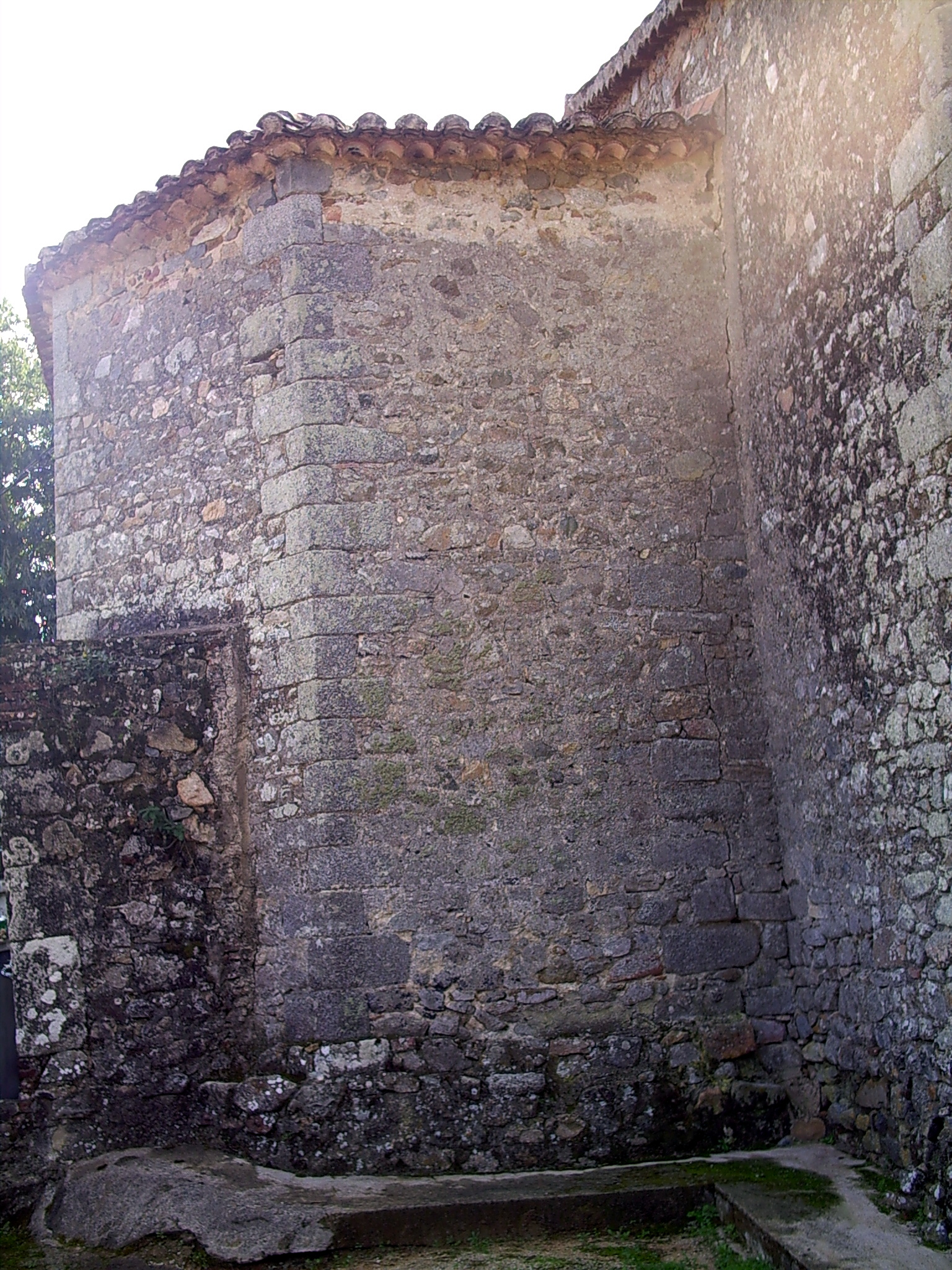
Apse of the Church of Sant Esteve

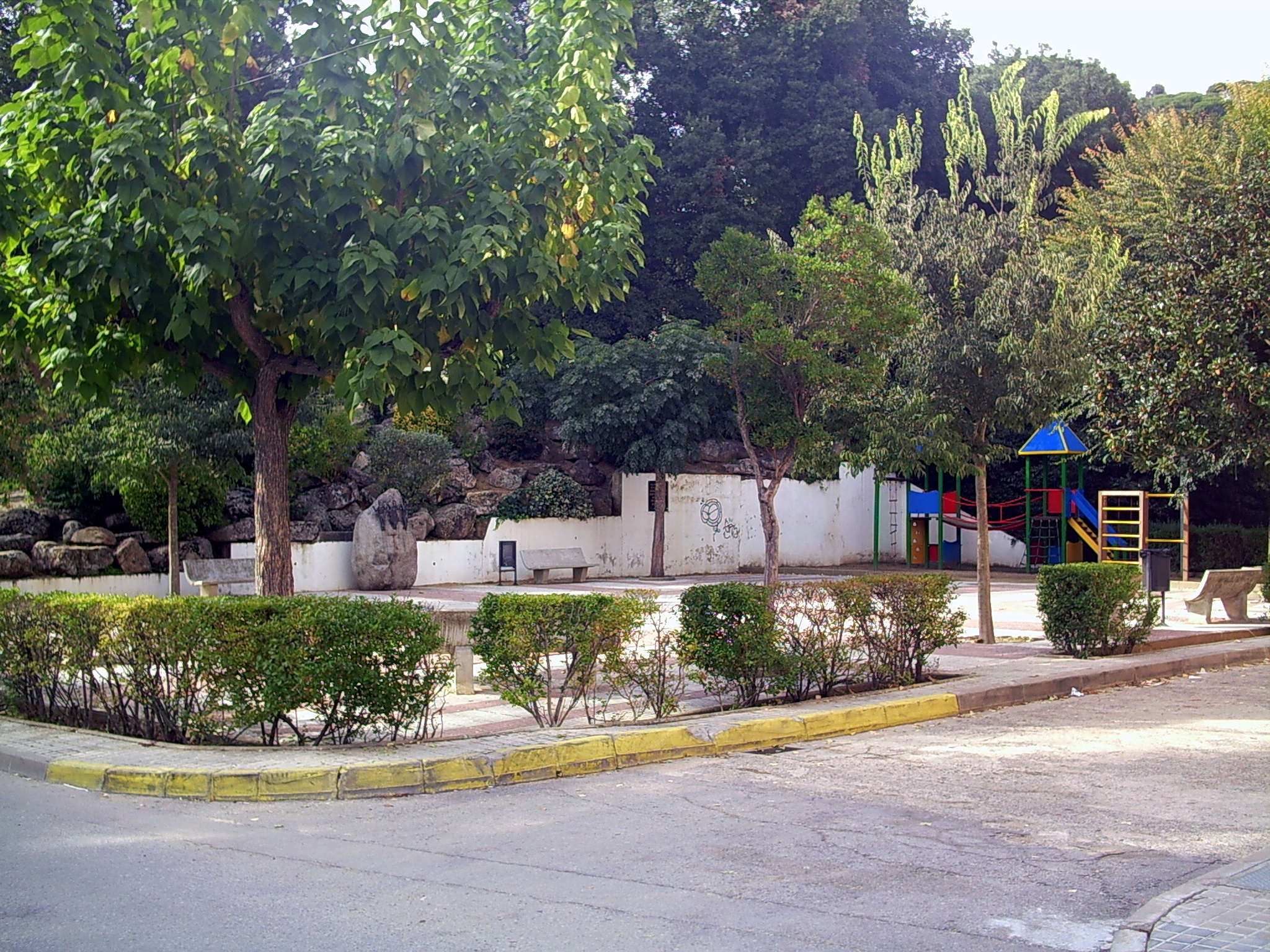
Plaça de la Germandat

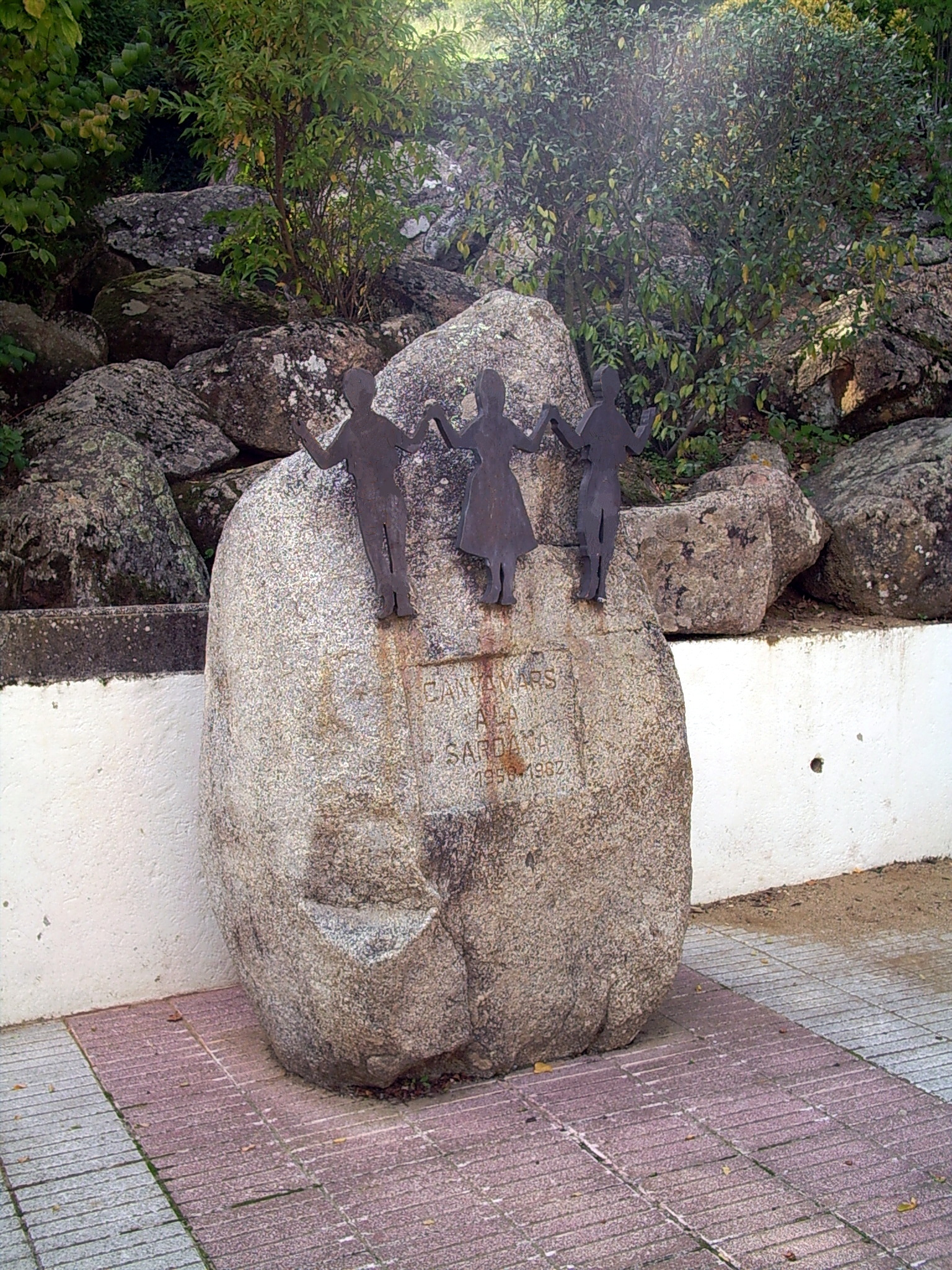
Monument to The Sardana, in the Plaça de la Germandat

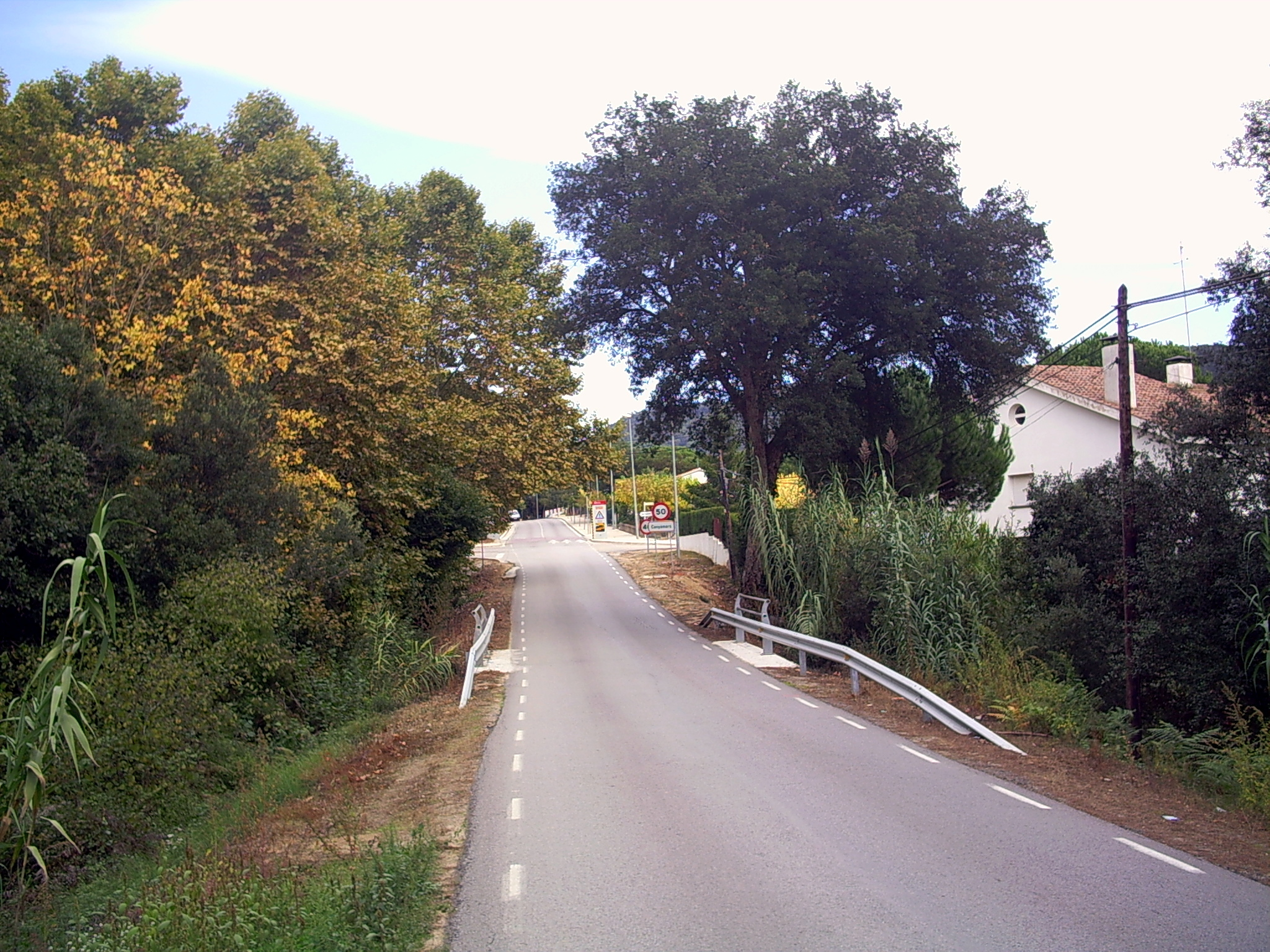
Entrance to the village

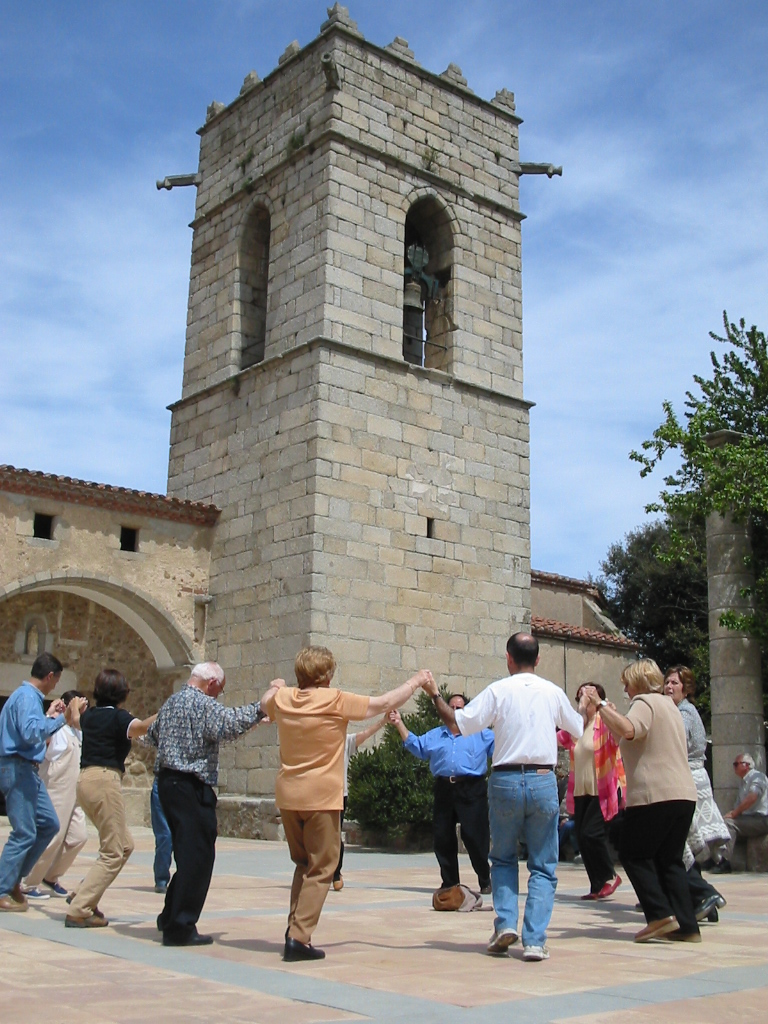
Sanctuari del Corredor
