= Dosrius =

- Municipality
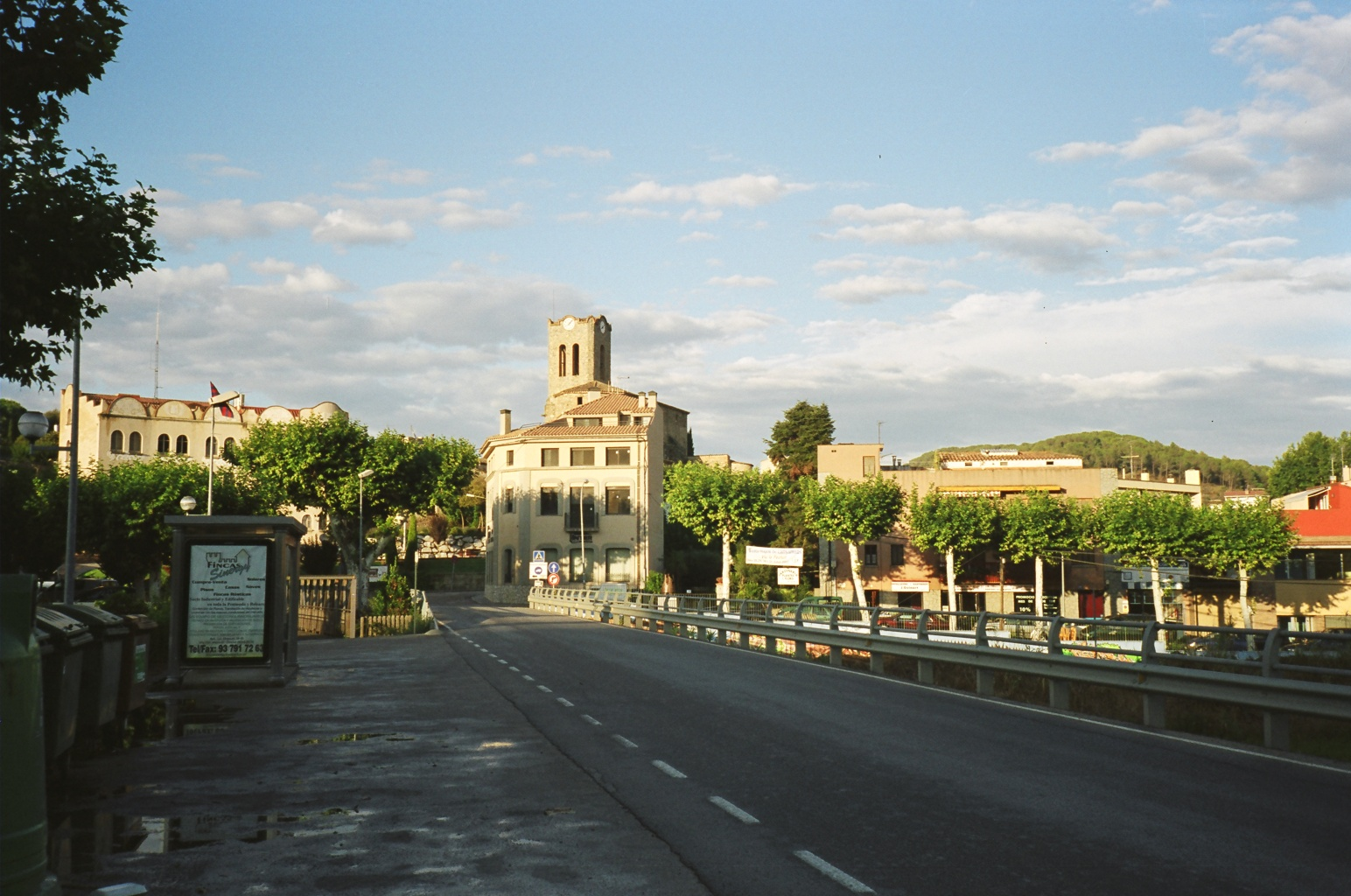

- Flag Coat of arms

- Location in Catalonia Dosrius (Spain)
- Coordinates: 41.594°N 2.406°E
- Country: Spain
- Community: Catalonia
- Province: Barcelona
- Comarca: Maresme

Government
  - Mayor: Marc Bosch De Doria (2015)

Area
  - Total: 40.7 km^{2} (15.7 sq mi)
- Elevation: 147 m (482 ft)

Population (2025-01-01)
  - Total: 6,287
  - Density: 154/km^{2} (400/sq mi)
- Demonym(s): Dosriuenc, dosriuenca
- Website: dosrius.cat

Dosrius (Catalan pronunciation: [ˌdozˈriws], lit. 'two rivers') is a municipality in the comarca of Maresme in Catalonia, Spain, located in the interior of the comarca on the border with the Eastern Valleys, and is at the head of the Argentona Riera. The original name, first recorded in 963, is "Duos Rios". This literally means "Two Rivers" and refers to the 2 rivers that join to form the Argentona Riera, and is reflected in the coat of arms. These rivers rarely flow, though they quickly fill during wet weather causing disruption in the village owing to the narrow streets being one way. Newer housing and schools are on the other side of the river, and egress from housing further up the valley frequently takes this route owing to the poor condition of the newly built "Ronda de Dalt" (Upper Bypass). A bridge has been built that would alleviate this problem, though this still hasn't been opened due to the currently suspended construction work that is part of the same development. It is unknown when the bridge will be open to traffic.

== Economy ==
The municipalities economy is based on various manufacturing processes, predominated by the textile industry, as well as being home to one of the two "Torres" crisp factories. Tourism also plays a large part, as there is an active Donkey sanctuary and a large adventure park, in addition to the area attracting large numbers of walkers and riders.

== Population ==
While Dosrius village itself has a predominantly permanent population, as does the neighboring village of Canyamars (a smaller village that falls within the municipality), there are also several urbanizations, Can Canyamars, Can Massuet, Can Figueras being the largest, which are predominantly second homes.

Historical population
Year	1991	1996	2001	2006
Pop.	1,211	2,269	3,098	4,469
±%	—	+87.4%	+36.5%	+44.3%

== Main sights ==
- Esglèsia de Sant Andreu del Far (Church of Saint Andrew of El Far), containing the tombs of the Counts of Bell-Lloc.
- Santuari del Corredor (Sanctuary of the Corredor), a 16th-century monastery situated in the Corredor Natural Park.
- Església de Sant Esteve (Church of Saint Steven) Canyamars.
- Dosrius Castle
- Pou de glaç (Ice Well), A semi subterranean ice house on the outskirts of Canyamars.

== Famous Inhabitants ==
- Esteve Albert - Writer and Politician.
- Joan of Canyamars - Farmer who fought against Ferdinand II of Aragon in Barcelona.
