= Maria de la Pau Janer =

Spanish writer

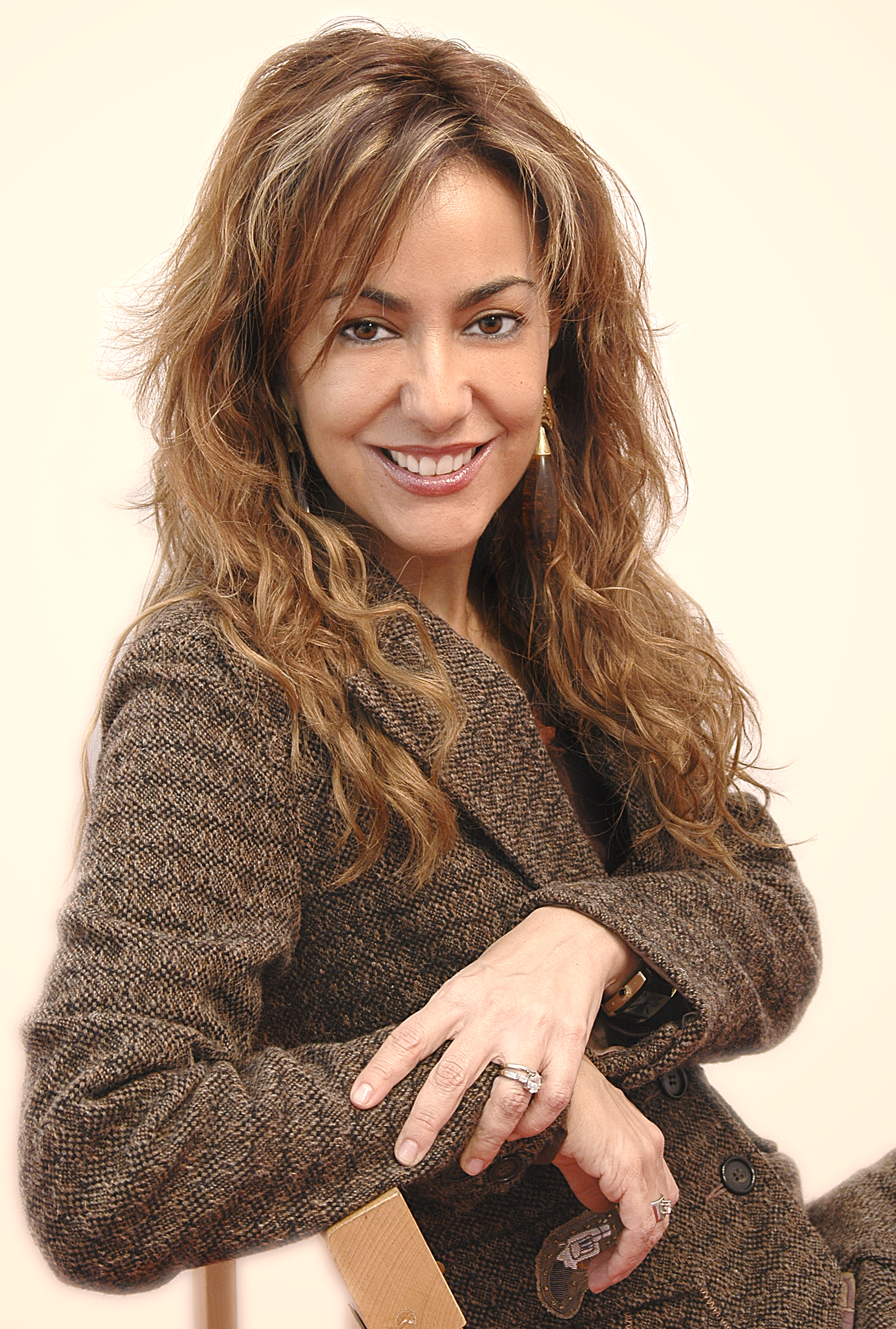
Maria de la Pau Janer in 2006

Maria de la Pau Janer (Catalan pronunciation: [məˈɾi.ə ðə lə ˈpaw ʒəˈne]; born 13 January 1966 in Mallorca) is a Spanish writer who works in Spanish and Catalan. She is a recipient of the Premio Planeta de Novela and the Ramon Llull Novel Award.

She got her PhD degree at the University of the Balearic Islands. She is a member of the Associació d'Escriptors en Llengua Catalana. She was married to Joan Oliver Araujo. They divorced and then she married Joan Corbella. Her father, Gabriel Janer Manila, is also a well-known writer.

== Works ==
- L'hora dels eclipsis (1989), won Premi Andròmina
- Màrmara (1993), won Premi Prudenci Bertrana
- Natura d'anguila (1995), won Premi Carlemany
- Orient, Occident (1997)
- Lola (1999), won Premi Ramon Llull
- Las mujeres que hay en mí (2002)
- Pasiones romanas (2005), won Premio Planeta.
