= Ramon Llull Novel Award =

Spanish literary award for novel

- Named for Ramon Llull
- Awarded for: Catalan language novel, essay, or memoir
- Sponsored by: Editorial Planeta; Government of Andorra
- Venue: Andorra
- Country: Spain
- First award: 1981
- Website: www.planetadelibros.com/premios/premi-de-les-lletres-catalanes-ramon-llull

The Ramon Llull Novel Award (Spanish: Premio Ramon Llull de novela; Catalan: Premi de les Lletres Catalanes Ramon Llull) is an honor given annually to a novel originally written in Catalan. Conceived in 1981 by editor José Manuel Lara Hernández, it is awarded by the Planeta publishing house in conjunction with the Government of Andorra. It confers a monetary prize, originally 250,000 pesetas and now €60,000 (US$67,720). It recognizes works of the greatest economic value in the Catalan language.

The original objective of the award was not only to encourage the writing of books in Catalan, but also to provide the greatest possible social and commercial dissemination, both to the works and to the authors. Therefore, the winning work is not only published in Catalan, but is immediately translated into Spanish and distributed throughout Spain and Latin America.

Although initially the award was reserved for novels, it is currently also open to essays and memoirs.

== Winners ==
Edition	Year	Work	Author	Ref
1st	1981	Les aventures del cavaller Kosmas	Joan Perucho	
2nd	1982	Sala de miralls	Ramon Folch i Camarasa	
3rd	1983	Fortuny	Pere Gimferrer	
4th	1984	El rellotge del pont d'Esplugues	Ignasi Riera	
5th	1985	El misteri del Cant Z-506	Miquel Ferrà	
6th	1986	Zona marítima	Olga Xirinacs Díaz	
7th	1987	Somni Delta	Valentí Puig	
8th	1988	Moro de rei	Pau Faner Coll	
9th	1989	Joc de miralls	Carme Riera	
10th	1990	Elogi de la passió pura	Sebastià Serrano	
11th	1991	Castell de cartes	Luis Romero	
12th	1992	El sexe dels àngels	Terenci Moix	
13th	1993	El jardí de les palmeres	Jaume Fuster	
14th	1994	La Rambla fa baixada	Néstor Luján	
15th	1995	Marià Manent, biografía íntima i literària	Albert Manent	
16th	1996	Santa Maria, pa cada dia	Josep Maria Ballarín i Monset	
17th	1997	D'avui a demà	Joan Corbella	
18th	1998	Parada obligatòria	Joan Barril	
19th	1999	Lola	Maria de la Pau Janer	
20th	2000	Delictes d'amor	Maria Mercè Roca	
21st	2001	L'emperador o l'ull del vent	Baltasar Porcel	
22nd	2002	Les seduccions de Júlia	Màrius Carol	
23rd	2003	El final de joc	Gemma Lienas	
24th	2004	Les set aromes del món	Alfred Bosch	
25th	2005	Per un sac d'ossos	Lluís-Anton Baulenas	
26th	2006	Farsa	Màrius Serra	
27th	2007	Tigres	Gabriel Janer Manila	
28th	2008	L'últim patriarca	Najat El Hachmi	
29th	2009	L'últim home que parlava català	Carles Casajuana	
30th	2010	Tenim un nom	Vicenç Villatoro	
31st	2011	Amor i guerra	Nuria Amat	
32nd	2012	La dona veloç	Imma Monsó	
33rd	2013	L'estiu que comença	Sílvia Soler	
34th	2014	Desig de xocolata	Care Santos	
35th	2015	Algú com tu	Xavier Bosch	
36th	2016	La filla del capità Groc	Víctor Amela	
37th	2017	Rosa de cendra	Pilar Rahola	
38th	2018	La força d'un destí	Martí Gironell	
39th	2019	El fill de l'italià	Rafel Nadal	
40th	2020	Tota una vida per recordar	Núria Pradas	
41st	2021	L'home que va viure dues vegades	Gerard Quintana	
42nd	2022	Benvolguda	Empar Moliner	
43rd	2023	París érem nosaltres	Andreu Claret	
44th	2024	Història d'un piano	Ramon Gener	
45th	2025	Aquest tros de vida	Estel Solé	
46th	2026	La segona vida de Ginebra Vern	Agnès Marquès	
