= Barril =

Barril is a Spanish surname. Notable people with the surname include:

- Bernat Solé i Barril (born 1975), Spanish industrial engineer and politician from Catalonia
- Eduardo Barril (born 1941), Chilean actor and theatre director
- José Barril (born 1992), Spanish football player
- Pilar Barril (1931–2011), Spanish tennis player
- Joan Barril (1952–2014), Catalan journalist and writer
- Paul Barril (born 1946), former officer of the French Gendarmerie Nationale
- Rogelio Barril (1898–?), Spanish footballer
