= David Guzman (journalist) =

David Guzman in 2026

David Guzman (born 1978, in Barcelona) is a cultural journalist specialising in literature and music.

Since 2017, he has hosted the literary program Ciutat Maragda on Catalunya Ràdio, where he also spent eight years hosting L'irradiador on iCat, as well as the music segment Viva l'Italia.

On television, he hosted the landscape and literature programme Rius de tinta (betevé), was sub-director of L’illa del tresor (canal 33) and has presented five seasons of the literary programme Qwerty on Btv, where he has also been an advisor to the magazine programme Àrtic, as well as presenter for the interview programme Terrícoles.

He has worked at Catalunya Ràdio since 2005, where he was part of El Cafè de la República—alongside Joan Barril—as well as programs such as Catalunya vespre, Estat de Gràcia, and El suplement. In print media, he has contributed to several outlets including Avui, El Periódico, La Vanguardia and El País.

He is a lecturer for the Master’s degree in Publishing at the UAB (Autonomous University of Barcelona) and the postgraduate program in Reading Promotion at the UB (University of Barcelona)

He is a co-author of several books, including Breve historia del leer (Ariel, 2009) and El fin de una época (Barril & Barral, 2011). In 2025, he was honored by the Association of Publishers in the Catalan Language with the 5th 'Difusió' (Dissemination) Award, which recognizes a public figure who stands out for making a notable contribution to the dissemination, fostering, promotion, and projection of Catalan-language publishing and literature within their professional sphere.
