= Silvia Soler =

Silvia Soler may refer to:

- Sílvia Soler i Guasch (born 1961), Catalan writer and journalist
- Sílvia Soler Espinosa (born 1987), Spanish tennis player
