= Our Father, Our President =

- Theatrical release poster
- Catalan: Parenostre
- Directed by: Manuel Huerga
- Screenplay by: Toni Soler
- Story by: Toni Soler; Albert Val; Marcel Barrena
- Produced by: Francesc Escribano; David Felani; Ariadna Dot; Tono Folguera
- Starring: Josep Maria Pou; Carme Sansa; Pere Arquillué; Eduardo Lloveras; Xavier Ricart; David Selvas; Marc Rius; Martina Roura; Sílvia Abril; Antonio Dechent; Alberto San Juan; Lluís Soler
- Cinematography: Mario Montero
- Edited by: Gus Alcocer
- Music by: Aida Ten
- Production companies: Minoria Absoluta; Lastor Media; Vilaüt Films; Last Minute AIE
- Distributed by: Filmax
- Release date: 16 April 2025
- Country: Spain
- Language: Catalan

Our Father, Our President (Catalan: Parenostre) is a 2025 Spanish biographical drama film directed by Manuel Huerga from a screenplay by Toni Soler reconstructing the downfall of Catalan pater patriae Jordi Pujol, portrayed by Josep Maria Pou.

== Plot ==
Former Catalan president Jordi Pujol manages reputation damage after a July 2014 announcement acknowledging having concealed money from the tax authorities and his alleged involvement in a series of corruption schemes that would come to be known as the 'Pujol Affair'.

== Cast ==
- Josep Maria Pou as Jordi Pujol
- Marc Rius as young Jordi Pujol
- Carme Sansa as Marta Ferrusola
- Martina Roura as young Marta Ferrusola
- Pere Arquillué as Jordi Pujol Ferrusola
- Eduardo Lloveras as Oriol Pujol Ferrusola
- Xavier Ricart as Josep Pujol Ferrusola
- David Selvas as Artur Mas
- Sílvia Abril as Vicky Álvarez
- Lluís Soler as mossèn Ballarín
- Alberto San Juan as Juan Carlos I
- Antonio Dechent as José Manuel Villarejo

== Production ==
The film was produced by Minoria Absoluta, Lastor Media, Vilaüt Films and Last Minute AIE. It was fully shot at the Mediapro studio in 22@Barcelona, exclusively using chroma keying.

== Release ==
Distributed by Filmax, the film was released theatrically in Spain on 16 April 2025.

== Reception ==
Javier Ocaña of El País assessed that [Our Father, Our President] "may be an interesting film to watch and analyze, but it is by no means a good film", otherwise declaring it as displaying "an almost exasperating digital stiffness".

Jordi Battle Caminal of La Vanguardia rated the film 2 out of 5 stars, deeming it to be "of dubious usefulness", failing to offer the viewer anything that they did not already know about the Pujols, while displaying a tendency for hagiography.

Alfonso Rivera of Cineuropa wrote that the film "exudes a certain TV movie flavour".

Eulàlia Iglesias of Ara rated the film 3 out of 5 stars, assessing that it "does not quite find the right balance between the degree of respect for the figure of Pujol and the farcical actions of his children", also considering that the visuals are spoiled by a "rather poor aesthetic finishing with digital flavor", but welcomed the normality entailed by a film about Pujol being made in Catalan cinema.

== See also ==
- List of Spanish films of 2025
