= Baulenas =

Baulenas may refer to:

== People ==
- Lluís-Anton Baulenas (born 1958), Spanish novelist
- Marta Cuní Baulenas, a competitor in the 2010 Spanish Figure Skating Championships

== Other ==
- Baulenas, alternate name of Bolinas, California
