= Està passant =

- Genre: Satire, news
- Directed by: Toni Soler i Guasch; Jaume Buixó
- Starring: Toni Soler i Guasch; Òscar Andreu i Fernández; Jair Domínguez i Torregrosa; Elisenda Carod; Marc Giró i Costa; Òscar Dalmau i Alcaine
- Country of origin: Catalonia
- Original language: Catalan
- No. of seasons: 7

Production
- Production locations: Sant Joan Despí, Baix Llobregat, Catalonia
- Running time: 45 minutes
- Production companies: Minoria Absoluta; Televisió de Catalunya

Original release
- Network: TV3
- Release: September 13, 2017 – present

Related
- Polònia; Alguna Pregunta Més?

Està passant (Catalan for It's happening) is a satirical news program that analyses current affairs, produced by Minoria Absoluta and broadcast in Catalonia by the public broadcaster TV3. The program mostly focuses on political news, mass media and social media in a satirical way. It is broadcast live from Monday to Thursday, and on Friday a summary of the best moments of the week is shown.

Initially, the team consisted of Toni Soler, Òscar Andreu and Jair Domínguez with occasional collaborations from Elisenda Carod. In the second season, the program added new collaborators such as Marc Giró and Alba Florejachs.

At the end of October 2018, Òscar Andreu left the program to focus on a new weekly television space (La nit dels Òscars) with the collaboration of Òscar Dalmau. In the third season, Elisenda Carod took a more main role along with Jair Domínguez, accompanying Toni Soler in the set.

Since late 2019, and during 2020, the program acquired new collaborators such as Lluís Jutglar Calvés (Peyu) or Magí García Vidal, in charge of the sports news section, as well as participating in the script of the program and obtaining a more important role, next to the presenters. In 2020, Òscar Andreu began once again taking part in the set as a one-off collaborator.

In September 2023, Toni Soler announced that he was stepping down as presenter of the show, handing it over to Òscar Andreu and Natza Farré, with the intention of eventually leaving the show and TVC altogether. On 21 December 2023, he made his last appearance on the show.

== Audience ==
Season	Broadcast date		Audience	
Season	Start	End	Viewers	Share
1	13 September 2017	20 July 2018	-	17.7%
2	10 September 2018	27 June 2019	370,000	18.1%
3	2 September 2019	26 June 2020	403,000	19.5%
4	7 September 2020	2 July 2021	-	-
5	6 September 2021	1 July 2022	-	-
6	5 September 2022	30 June 2023	-	-
7	4 September 2023	(Ongoing)	-	-

The month in which the trial of the independence leaders began, February 2019, was the one that set the best figures, with a share of 20.5%. The most watched episode was on 26 February 2019, with a percentage of 24.8% and 614,000 viewers.

== See also ==
- Polònia
- Alguna Pregunta Més?
- CCMA
