= Baltasar Porcel =

Spanish writer and journalist

Baltasar Porcel i Pujol
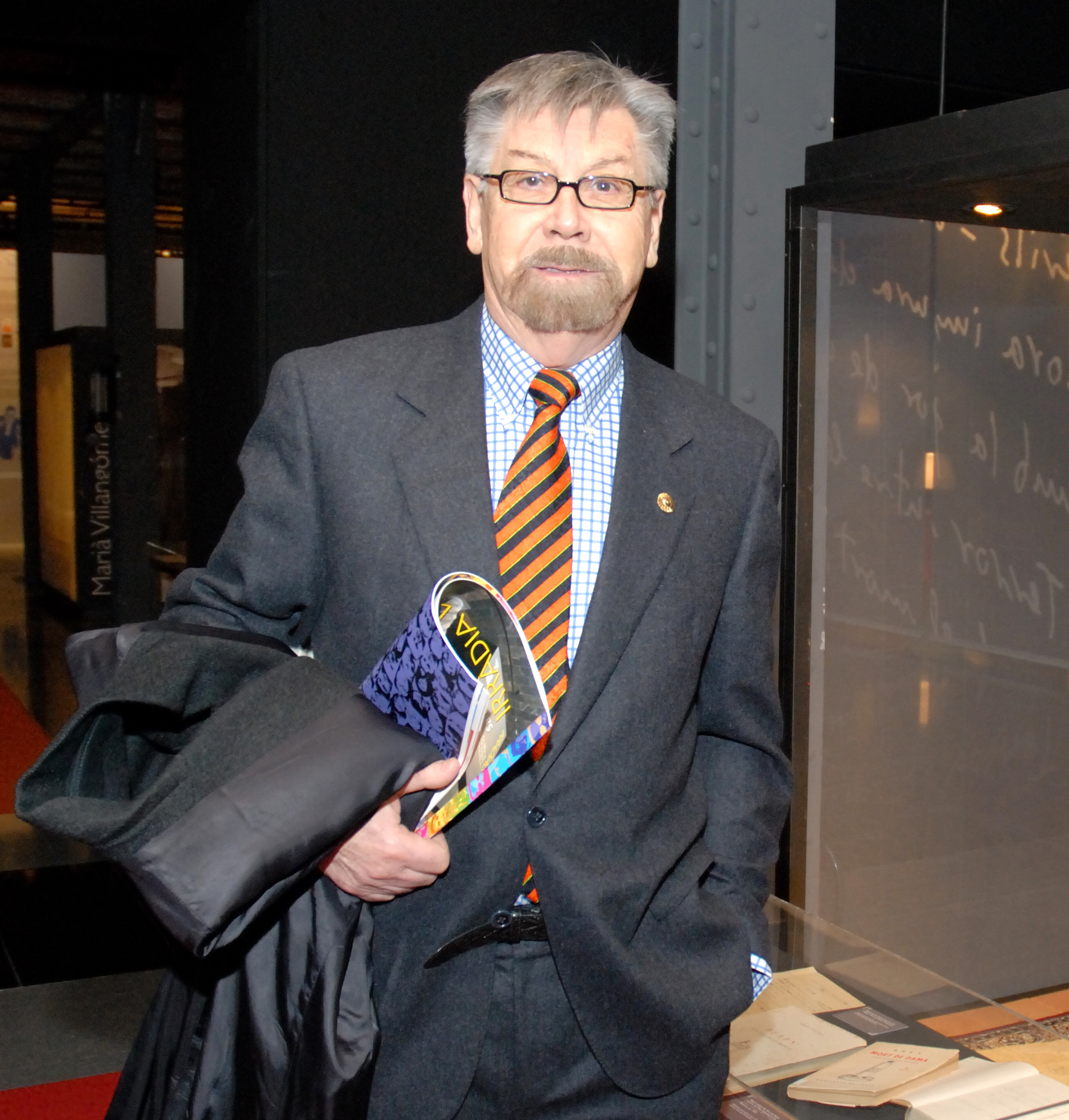
- Porcel in 2006
- Born: 14 March 1937; Andratx, Mallorca
- Died: 1 July 2009 (aged 72); Barcelona, Spain
- Occupations: Journalist, writer
- Writing career
- Notable awards: Prudenci Bertrana Prize; 1997 Ulises a alta mar Premi d'Honor de les Lletres Catalanes; 2007

Baltasar Porcel i Pujol (Catalan pronunciation: [bəltəˈza puɾˈsɛl]; Andratx, Majorca, 14 March 1937 – Barcelona, 1 July 2009) was a Spanish writer, journalist and literary critic. His enormous legacy credited him as one of the greatest authors in Catalan literature from the 20th century.

== Biography ==
He was born on 14 March 1937 in Andratx, Majorca. His Catalan language works have been translated into Spanish, German, English, French, Italian and Vietnamese among other languages. He also won several literary prizes. As a journalist he worked on La Vanguardia, Última Hora and Catalunya Ràdio. From 1960 he lived in both Barcelona and Majorca. He was the president of the Catalan Institute for the Mediterranean from 1989 to 2000. In 2001 he won the Ramon Llull Novel Award for L'emperador o l'ull del vent . In 2002 he won the Catalan Premi Nacional de Literatura and in 2007 the Premi d'Honor de les Lletres Catalanes. He also received in Italy the Premio letterario Boccaccio, in France the Prix Méditerranée and in the United States the Critic's Choice.

Porcel died on 1 July 2009 at the age of 72 after several years battling cancer.

== Works ==
=== Novels ===
- 1961 Solnegre
- 1963 La lluna i el Cala Llamp
- 1965 Els escorpins
- 1968 Els argonautes
- 1970 Difunts sota els ametllers en flor
- 1975 Cavalls cap a la fosca
- 1980 Les pomes d'or
- 1984 Els dies immortals
- 1986 Les primaveres i les tardors
- 1989 El divorci de Berta Barca
- 1994 Lola i els peixos morts
- 1997 Ulisses a alta mar
- 2000 El cor del senglar
- 2001 L'emperador o l'ull del vent
- 2004 Olympia a mitjanit
- 2008 Cada castell i totes les ombres

=== Essays ===
- 1967 Viatge literari a Mallorca
- 1967 Arran de mar
- 1968 Viatge a les Balears menors
- 1969 Els xuetes
- 1969 Exercicis més o menys espirituals
- 1973 Debat català
- 1977 Diàlegs
- 1987 Els meus inèdits de Llorenç Villalonga
- 1990 A totes les illes
- 1993 Camprodon. Una vall del Pirineu.

==== Interviews ====
- 2003 L'àguila daurada

==== Literary biographies ====
- 1972 Grans catalans d'ara
- 2002 El drama i la mar. Entrevista amb Jacint Verdaguer.

==== Travels ====
- 1971 Crònica d'atabalades navegacions
- 1977 Camins i ombres
- 1984 Les illes encantades
- 1996 Mediterrània. Onatges tumultuosos.

=== Short novels ===
- 1979 Reivindicació de la vídua Txing
- 1982 El misteri de l'alzinar i altres contes
- 1984 Tots els contes
- 2002 Les maniobres de l'amor: Tots els contes, 1958–2001

=== Theatre ===
- 1959 Els condemnats
- 1962 La simbomba fosca
- 1965 Teatre
- 1981 Els dolços murmuris del mar

=== Complete works ===
- 1991–1997 Obres completes (7 volums)

=== As actor ===
- 1960 Els condemnats. València: Teatre Estudi.
- 1962 La simbomba fosca. Companyia Agrupació Dramàtica de Barcelona.
- 1962 Èxode. Barcelona: Companyia Teatre Experimental Català.
- 1965 El general. Grup Sis x Set: Terrassa.
- 1965 Romanç de cec. Grup Sis x Set: Terrassa.

=== Works for TV ===
- El món en català.
- L'espai de Baltasar Porcel.
- Una nit d'estiu.
- L'entrevista impossible, Jacint Verdaguer.

=== Foreign language works ===
- 1989 Baleares
- 1994 Viajes expectantes. De Marrakech a Pekín.
- 2004 Geografías expectantes
