= Núria Pradas =

Spanish Catalan philologist and writer (born 1954)

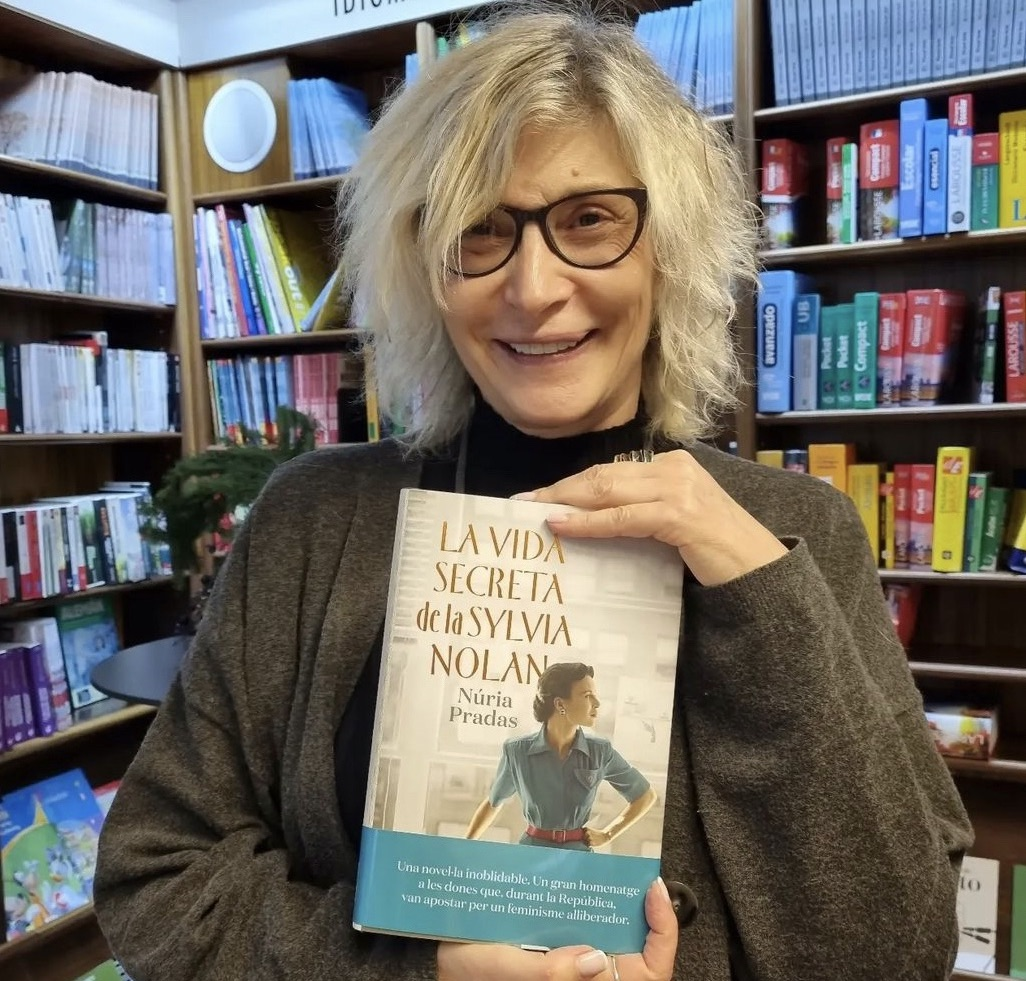
- Núria Pradas (2023)
- Born: Núria Pradas i Andreu; 1 September 1954 (age 72); Barcelona, Spain
- Education: University of Barcelona
- Occupation: Author
- Writing career
- Language: Catalan; Spanish
- Genres: Children's and youth literature; Adult fiction
- Notable awards: Premio Ferran Canyameres; Premio Carmesina; Premio Ciutat d'Olot; Premio Agna Canalies Mestres; Premio Carlemany; Premio Ramon Llull

Núria Pradas i Andreu (born 1 September 1954) is a Spanish Catalan philologist and writer. She began her literary career in the field of children's and youth literature. She is the author of an extensive literary production in this field as well as in adult fiction.

== Biography ==
Núria Pradas i Andreu was born in Barcelona, 1 September 1954, in neighborhood of El Poblenou. Her love of reading led her to study Catalan Philology at the University of Barcelona, graduating in 1980. Immediately, she began working there as a Catalan Language and Literature teacher. It was in Sant Feliu de Llobregat, where she lived for a long time, that her career began in amateur theatre, specifically in the Enric Borràs company, which served as an experience for her to later direct youth theater groups and also to write her own plays. She also collaborated with Borràs in the theater group L'Ull de Bou of Sant Esteve Sesrovires.

From theater, she moved on to narrative and in 1995, she published her first book, Sol d'hivern, with which she began her career in children's and youth literature. In 2012, she was awarded the Premi Carlemany for Sota el mateix cel. In 2014, she published her first novel for adults, La Noia de la Biblioteca, which was followed by Somnis a mida (2016), translated into more than ten languages, and L'aroma del temps (2018).

In 2020, she won the Ramon Llull Novel Award with Tota una vida per recuerdo, a novel set in the U.S. during the 1930s, focused on the world of cartoons. Among her latest youth novels, can be noted, Ella (2020) and El cant del cigne (2022), while her latest novel for an adult audience is La vida secreta de Sylvia Nolan (Ed. Fate, 2022).

== Awards and honours ==
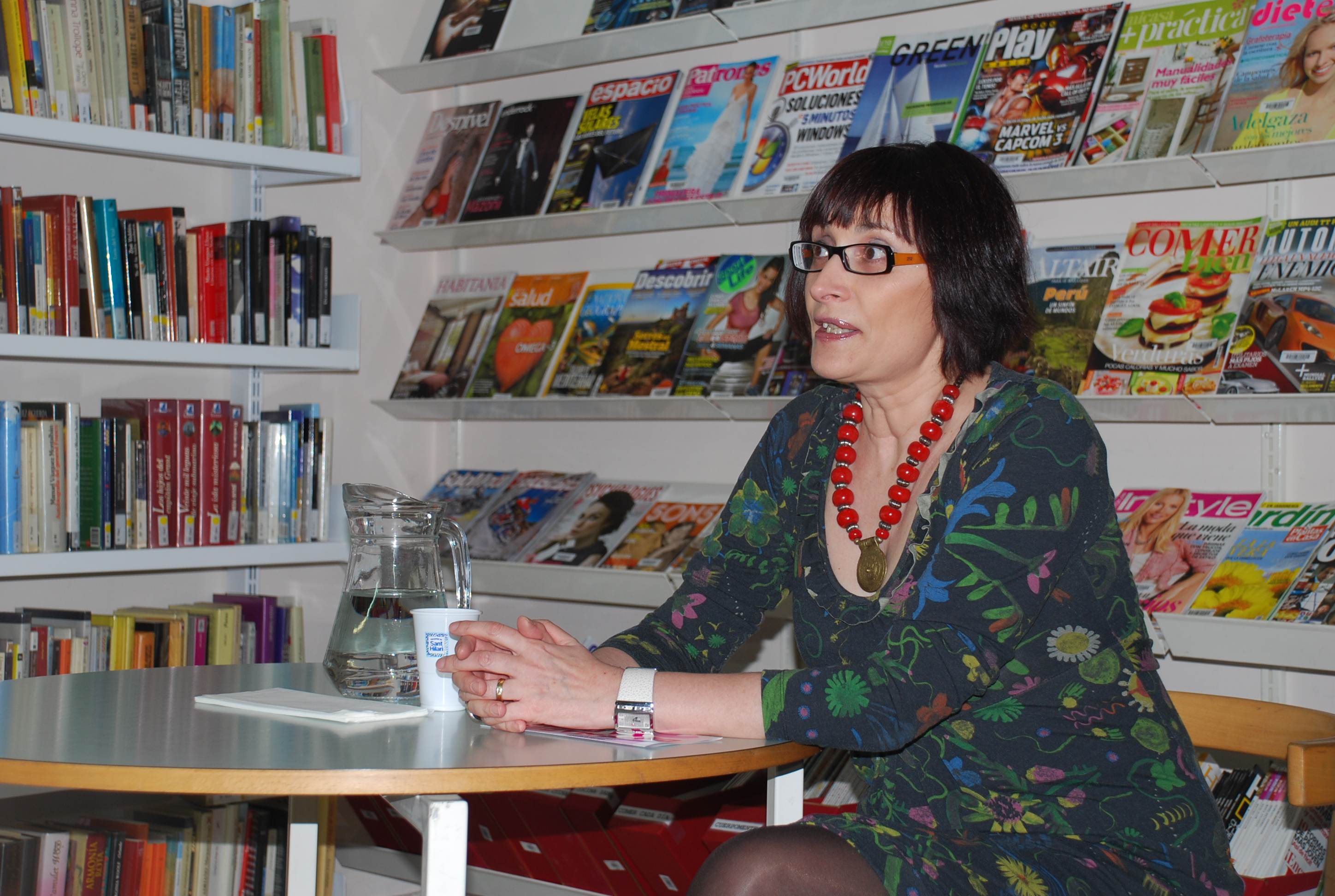
(2010)

- Premio Ferran Canyameres for Parella de Dames (1996)
- Premio Carmesina for La Princesa Pomèlia (1998)
- Premio Ciutat d'Olot for A carn, a carn! (2002)
- Premio Agna Canalies Mestres (2009)
- Premio Carlemany (2012)
- Premio Ramon Llull for Tota una vida per recordar (2020)

== Selected works ==
=== Children's and youth literature ===
- 1995: Sol d'hivern, Ed. Baula
- 1995: Lior, Ed. Cruïlla
- 1995: L'extraordinària píndola rosa, Ed. Cruïlla
- 1996: La batalla de la sopa, Ed. Baula
- 1996: Un estiu amb l'Anna, Ed. Cruïlla
- 1996: Posa una tieta Adela a la teva vida, Ed. Baula
- 1996: Parella de dames, Ed. Baula
- 1997: Algú ha vist en Puck?, Ed. Cruïlla
- 1998: Simfonia per a un segrest, Ed. Alfaguara
- 1998: La vareta Boja, Ed. Cruïlla
- 1998: La princesa Pomèlia, Ed. del Bullent
- 1998: La tieta Adela del Nil, Ed. Baula
- 1999: Laura, Ed. Cruïlla
- 1999: Els iungs, Ed. La Galera
- 1999: Ai, Antonia o t'has ficat?, Ed. Baula
- 2000: L'IJ a la recerca de la iaia perduda, Ed. Alfaguara
- 2000: Diaris de campaments, Ed. Casals
- 2000: L'Intrús, Ed. Cruïlla
- 2001: Embolic al món del no-res, Ed. La Galera
- 2002: La serpent de plomes, Ed. Cruïlla
- 2002: La tieta Adela a Nova York, Ed. Baula
- 2002: A carn, a carn!, Ed. La Galera
- 2003: La Pipa ha perdut la son, Ed. Cruïlla
- 2004: L'últim refugi, Ed. Alfaguara
- 2005: Això no mola, Escarola!, Ed. Barcanova
- 2005: Curs per a joves detectius, Ed. La Galera
- 2005: Curs per a joves genets de dracs, Ed. La Galera
- 2005: Manhattan, Ed. Baula
- 2006: Curs per a joves patges reials, Ed. La Galera
- 2006: Misteri al carrer de les Glicines, Ed. Bambú
- 2006: La tieta Adela a Sevilla, Ed. Baula
- 2006: Curs per a joves fades bones, Ed. La Galera
- 2006: Una nit de reis boja, Ed. La Galera
- 2007: Quina família!, Ed. La Galera
- 2008: Postals en sèpia, Ed. Planeta
- 2009: Paraules figurades, Ed. Barcanova. Col. “Mots Vius”
- 2009: Els secrets de la vida, Ara Editorial
- 2010: : La bruixeta Encantada i l'escombra Primmirada, Ed. Alfaguara
- 2010: Sant Jordi i el drac, Ed. Barcanova, Col. El Petit Univers
- 2010: Heka, un viatge màgic a Egipte. Ed. Bambú
- 2010: La colla de les mofetes, Ed. Barcanova
- 2011: Raidho, Ed. Bambú
- 2011: La tieta Adela a Venècia, Ed. Baula
- 2011: Lulú Pecas: Un secreto secretísimo, Ed. Medialive
- 2011: Lulú Pecas: Aventura en el colegio, Ed. Medialive
- 2011: Lulú Pecas: Lulú y su superequipo, Ed. Medialive
- 2011: Lulú Pecas: Un cumpleaños muy molón, Ed. Medialive
- 2012: : Lulú se pone estupenda, Ed. Medialive
- 2012. Koknom, Ed. Bambú
- 2014: Els desastrosos encanteris de la bruixa Serafina, Ed. Bambú
- 2014: Abril és nom de Primavera, Ed. Animallibres
- 2014: Felipe Qué Flipe y el Supermóvil, Ed. RBA
- 2014: Felipe qué Flipe en tierra de dinosaurios, Ed. RBA
- 2014: Black soul, Ed. Bambú
- 2016: La filla de l'argenter, Ed. Animallibres
- 2020: Ella, ed. Bambú
- 2022: El cant del cigne, ed. Bambú

=== Crossover literature (for all audiences) ===
- 2012: El perfum de les llimones, Món Abacus
- 2013: Sota el mateix cel, Ed. Columna
- 2014: Nebbia, Ed. Bromera
- 2020: La marca del lleó, Ed. Fanbooks (with Glòria Sabaté)

=== Novels ===
- 2014: La noia de la biblioteca, Ed. Columna
- 2016: Somnis a mida, Ed. Columna.
- 2017: La pintora del barret de palla, Ed. Edafós
- 2017: L'aroma del temps
- 2020: Tota una vida per recordar
- 2022: La vida secreta de la Sylvia Nolan

=== Translations ===
- 2009: Ferotge, el Cavernícola, Ed. La Galera (French translation)
- 2011: Dani Bocafoc (1 i 2), Ed. La Galera (Spanish translation)
- 2012: Vordak, L'Ultramalvat, Ed. La Galera (Spanish translation)
- 2012: L'inspector Gadget, Ed. La Galera
- 2012: Johnny Test, Ed. La Galera

=== Easy reading adaptations for Castellnou Edicions ===
- El libro de la Selva
- Dràcula
- El gos dels Baskerville
- Orgullo y perjuicio
- Grandes esperanzas
