= L'adolescent de sal =

1975 novel by Biel Mesquida

- Author: Biel Mesquida
- Language: Catalan
- Publication date: 1975

L’adolescent de sal is a novel by the Catalan writer Biel Mesquida, published in 1975. The novel denounces 1970s society from the passionate perspective of a teenager.

== Plot summary ==
A young man from Mallorca analyzes the crisis of bourgeois consciousness through the sparse writing of prose and poems that express repression, the desire for freedom, and the discovery of love and pleasure.

The boy struggles with his inner contradictions to eliminate old prejudices and transform society. Both the work and the act of writing are presented as acts of rebellion against the establishment — Catholicism, police oppression, society based on the traditional family, and the traditional road to riches. The young man discovers gradually the culture that he had been denied due to a punitive religious education. A narrator presents the work as one in which the teenager expresses his point of view, emotions, fears, and insights. The idea is that the reader advances through the text hastily to come to his or her own conclusions.

Cheska, the protagonist's girlfriend who studies theater, will be on the receiving end of the adolescent's literary efforts.

== Major themes ==
The boy's mother serves as a symbol of oppression; through her monologues, we understand the challenge that the reading of her son's pages has posed to her traditional values.

The father represents power and authority, and, finally, the study group provides the brushstrokes of historical context.

== Analysis ==
The reader participates in a meta-text that imitates the style of the school punishments, religious dogmas, and press releases, that is mixed in with the nascent writings of the teenager.

Stylistically, the text is notable for the fragmentation and mixture of genres: diary, letter, prose, poem, comics, etc.

Formal innovation is presented disruptively in several ways: quotes are recurrent and demanding; the typography is used to denounce or to highlight characters or ideas; the footnotes acquire narrative and theoretical value; the fiction within a fiction assumes a Brechtian ethico-revolutionary character.

Drawings, handwritten lines, censored cutouts, and galley proofs provoke the reader's reflection.

== Awards and nominations ==
L’adolescent de sal marked a milestone in the 1970s in Catalonia, and won the Prudenci Bertrana prize. <Diccionari de la Literatura Catalana, 2008>
