= Miquel Desclot =

Spanish writer

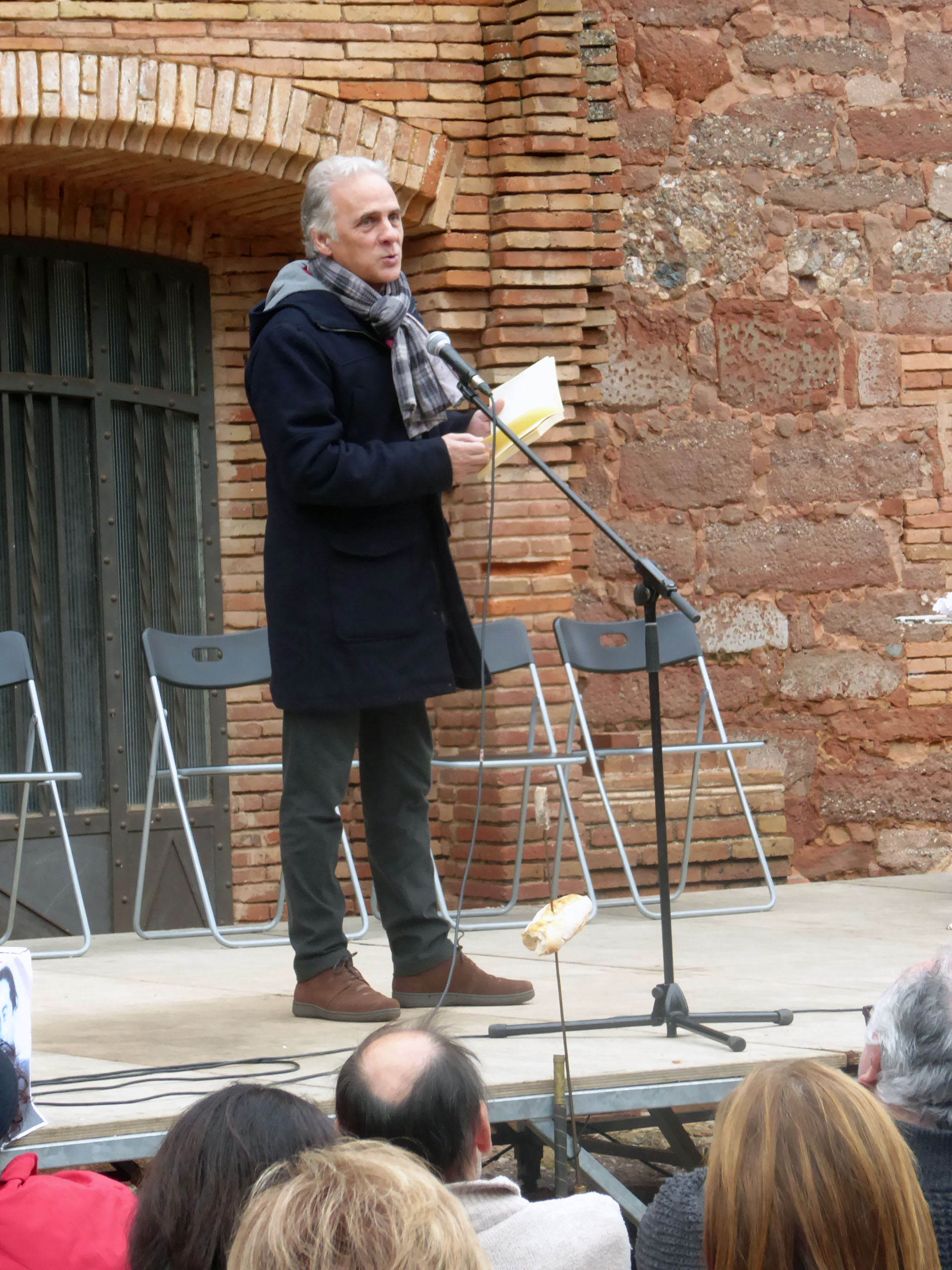
Miquel Desclot, in a poetic vermouth in homage to Pere Quart at the Marquet de les Roques

Miquel Creus i Muñoz alias Miquel Desclot (Barcelona, 1952) is a Spanish writer and translator known for his Catalan translations of works by Dante, Petrarca or Michelangelo Buonarroti. He was one of the founders of the Catalan literary collective, Ofèlia Dracs around 1976.

== Awards ==
- 1971 Premi Amadeu Oller de poesia Ira és trista passió
- 1972 Premi Màrius Torres de poesia per El riu de lava
- 1985 Premi Josep Maria de Sagarra, de traducció teatral Les mamelles de Tirèsies, Guillaume Apollinaire
- 1985 Premi Lola Anglada, Set que no dormen a la palla
- 1987 Premi Pere Quart d'humor i sàtira Auques i espantalls
- 1988 Premi de la Generalitat a la millor traducció en vers Llibres profètics de Lambeth, I: Profecies polítiques, William Blake
- 1988 Premio Nacional de traducción de literatura infantil, Versos perversos de Roald Dahl
- 1993 Premi Crítica Serra d'Or de memòries, Llibre de Durham
- 1993 Premi Crítica Serra d'Or de poesia per a infants, Bestiolari de la Clara
- 1996 Premi Cavall Verd Rafael Jaume de traducció poètica, Per tot coixí les herbes
- 1997 Premi Caixa de Girona dels Ciutat d'Olot, De llavis del gran bruixot
- 2000 Premi Crítica Serra d'Or de traducció, Saps la terra on floreix el llimoner: Dante, Petrarca, Michelangelo
- 2000 Premi Jaume Vidal i Alcover de projectes de traducció
- 2002 Premio Nacional de literatura infantil y juvenil, Més música, mestre!
- 2020 Carles Riba Poetry Prize, Despertar-me quan no dormo

== Works ==
=== Poetry ===
- 1971 Ira és trista passió
- 1974 Viatge perillós i al•lucinant a través de mil tres-cents vint-i-set versos infestats de pirates i de lladres de camí ral
- 1978 Cançons de la lluna al barret
- 1983 Juvenília
- 1987 Auques i espantalls
- 1987 Música, mestre!
- 1992 El llevant bufa a ponent
- 1992 Com si de sempre
- 1995 Oi, Eloi?
- 2001 Més música, mestre!
- 2003 Menú d'astronauta
- 2004 Bestiolari de la Clara
- 2006 Fantasies, variacions i fuga

=== Prose ===
- 1992 Llibre de Durham
- 1994 Montseny, temps avall
- 1996 Veïna de pedra viva
- 2002 Pare, saps què?
- 2004 Muntanyes relegades

==== Children's books ====
- 1971 El blanc i el negre
- 1971 La casa de les mones
- 1973Fava, favera
- 1973 El gran joc dels colors
- 1978 Itawa
- 1980 A la punta de la llengua
- 1980 Waïnämöïnen
- 1983 No riu el riu
- 1986 Què descobreix l'Atlàntida
- 1986 Set que no dormen a la palla
- 1988 Barraca de nas
- 1991 Més de set que no dormen a la palla
- 1993 La cadena d'or
- 1994 Flordecol
- 1995 Amors i desamors d'Oberó i Titània
- 1995 Lluna de mel al Palau de vidre
- 1996 Viatge inaugural a l'Antitetànic
- 1997 La flauta màgica
- 1997 De llavis del Gran Bruixot: els herois de Kalevala
- 1997 La cançó més bonica del món
- 1998 El barber de Sevilla
- 2004 Nas de barraca
- 2004 Aristòtil entre escombraries
- 2004 Amor a mar
- 2005 Les mines del rei Xang Phi Nyo
- 2007 Des de Lapònia, amb amor
- 2008 Pallufet & Ventaflocs

=== Theatre ===
- 1997 Història del sultà
- 2002 Tot esperant l'emperador

=== Essay ===
- 2003 L'edat d'or de la música

=== Discography ===
- 1986 La cançó més bonica del món
- 1994 Fills del segle
- 2002 Transatlàntida
- 2003 Cançó a cau d'orella
- 2004 Un concert desconcertant
