= Joan Corbella =

Spanish psychiatrist and science communicator (1945–2021)

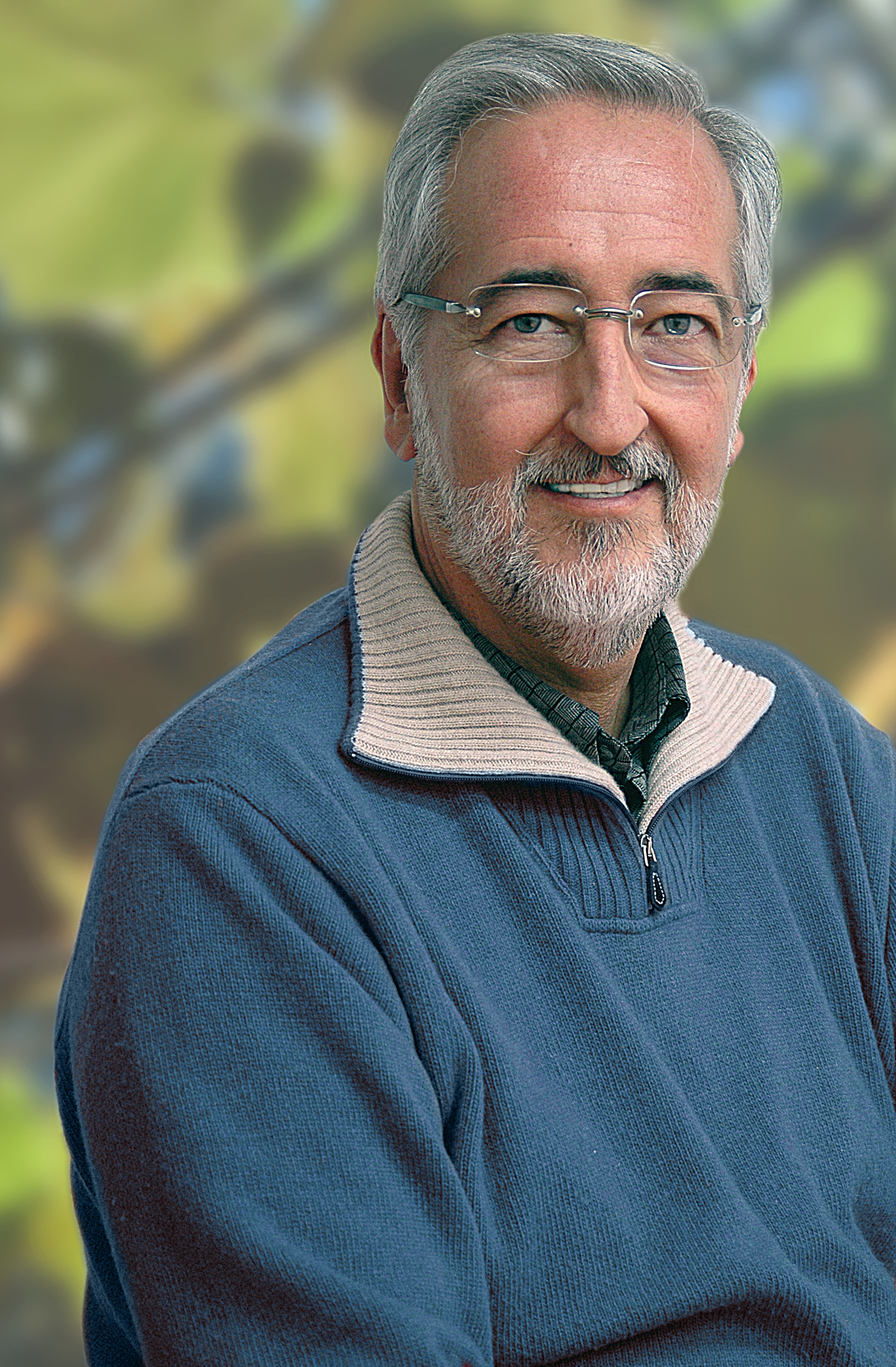
- Corbella in 2005
- Born: Joan Corbella i Roig; 1945; Santa Coloma de Queralt, Francoist Spain
- Died: 3 February 2021 (aged 75–76); Palma de Mallorca, Spain
- Occupation: Psychiatrist

Joan Corbella i Roig (1945 – 3 February 2021) was a Spanish psychiatrist and science communicator.

== Biography ==
Corbella promoted the presence of psychiatry in the media, where he became quite popular. He worked for Ràdio Barcelona, Cadena COPE, TV3, Ràdio Estel, Onda Cero, and Avui. He directed the Enciclopedia práctica de la psicología and wrote various books of psychiatry, such as Qui som, què fem, Viure sense por, Ante una edad difícil, La por del silenci, Viure en parella, and Pensar o viure. He also wrote the novel D'avui per demà, which won the Ramon Llull Novel Award in 1997.

Since 2005 he has been married to the writer Maria de la Pau Janer, with whom he has worked on television and radio programmes.

Joan Corbella died in Palma de Mallorca on 3 February 2021 at the age of 76, a few days after his birthday.
