= Quim Monzó =

Spanish writer

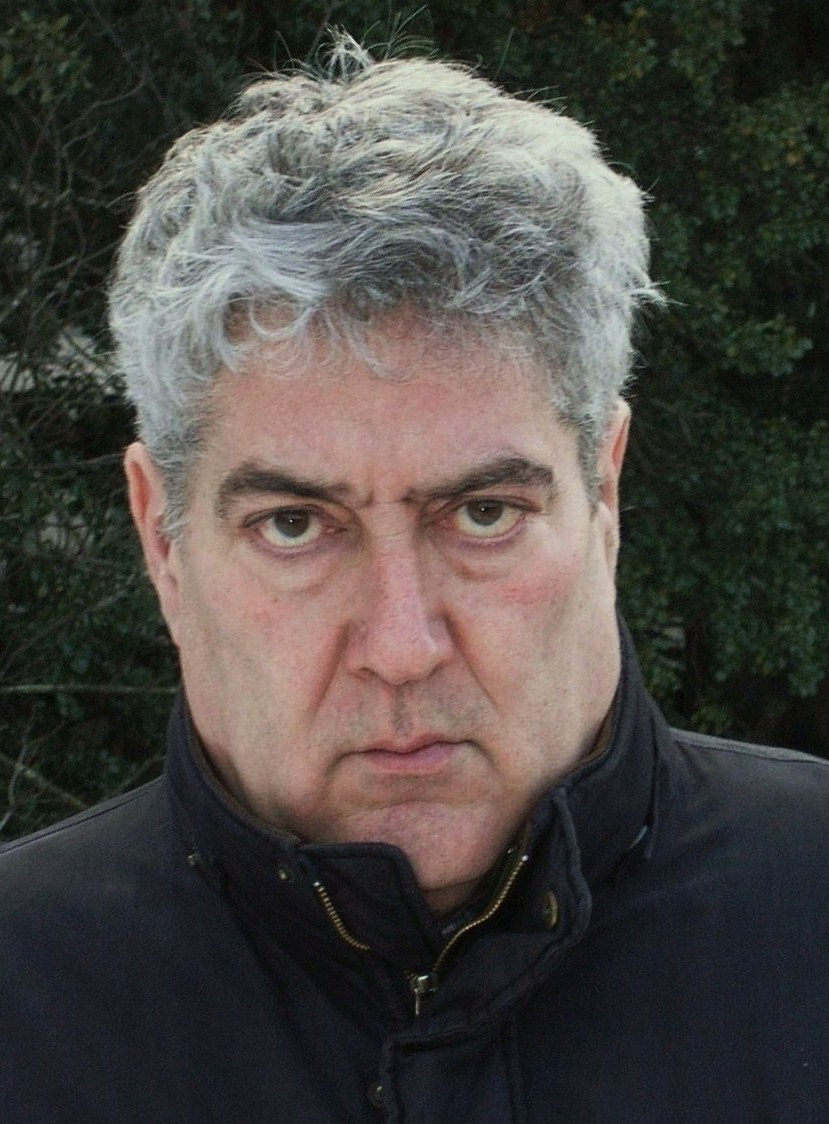
- Born: 15 March 1952 (age 74); Barcelona, Catalonia, Spain
- Occupations: Journalist, Novelist
- Website: www.monzo.info/inde.htm

Joaquim Monzó i Gómez (born 15 March 1952), also known as Quim Monzó (Catalan pronunciation: [ˈkim munˈso]), is a contemporary Spanish writer of novels, short stories and discursive prose, mostly in Catalan. In the early 1970s, Monzó reported from Vietnam, Cambodia, Northern Ireland and East Africa for the Barcelona newspaper Tele/eXpres. He was one of the members of the Catalan literary collective, Ofèlia Dracs. He lives in Barcelona and publishes regularly in La Vanguardia.

His fiction is characterized by an awareness of pop culture and irony. His other prose maintains this humor. One collection of his essays, Catorze ciutats comptant-hi Brooklyn, is notable for its account of New York City in the days immediately following September 11. In collaboration with Cuca Canals, he wrote the dialogue for Bigas Luna's Jamón, jamón. He has also written El tango de Don Joan, with Jérôme Savary.

In 2007 he wrote and read the opening speech at the Frankfurt Book Fair, the year in which Catalan culture was the guest. Monzó designed an acclaimed lecture written as if it were a short story, thus differing completely from a traditional speech. From December 2009 to April 2010 there took place in the Arts Santa Mònica Gallery in Barcelona a great retrospective exhibition on his life and his work, called Monzó.

== Bibliography ==
=== Books in English ===
- O'Clock, 1986. New York: Ballantine Books. Translated by Mary Ann Newman. ISBN 978-0-345-31668-4 ISBN 0345316681
- The enormity of the tragedy, 2007. London: Peter Owen Publishers. Translated by Peter Bush. ISBN 978-0-7206-1299-8 ISBN 0720612993
- Gasoline, 2010. Rochester, NY: Open Letter. Translated by Mary Ann Newman. ISBN 978-1-934824-18-4; ISBN 1-934824-18-6
- Guadalajara, 2011, Rochester, NY: Open Letter. Translated by Peter Bush. ISBN 978-1-934824-19-1; ISBN 1-934824-19-4
- A thousand morons, 2013, Rochester, NY: Open Letter. Translated by Peter Bush. ISBN 978-1-934824-41-2; ISBN 1-934824-41-0
- Why, Why, Why?, 2019, Rochester, NY: Open Letter. Translated by Peter Bush. ISBN 978-1948830041; ISBN 1948830043

=== Books in Catalan ===
==== Fiction ====
- L'udol del griso al caire de les clavegueres, 1976. Winner of the Premi Prudenci Bertrana (1976).
- Self Service, 1977. In collaboration with Biel Mesquida.
- Uf, va dir ell, 1978.
- Olivetti, Moulinex, Chaffoteaux et Maury, 1980. Winner of the Premi de la Crítica Serra d'Or in 1981.
- Benzina, 1983.
- L'illa de Maians, 1985. Awarded the Premi de la Crítica Serra d'Or, 1986.
- La magnitud de la tragèdia, 1989. Winner of the Premi de Novel·la El Temps, 1989.
- El perquè de tot plegat, 1993. Awarded the Premi Ciutat de Barcelona in 1993, and the Premi de la Crítica Serra d'Or in 1994.
- Guadalajara, 1996. Awarded the Premi de la Crítica Serra d'Or, 1997.
- Vuitanta-sis contes (comprising Uf, va dir ell, Olivetti, Moulinex, Chaffoteaux et Maury, L'illa de Maians, El perquè de tot plegat and Guadalajara), 1999. Awarded the Premi Nacional de Literatura and Premi Lletra d'Or, both in 2000.
- El millor dels mons, 2001.
- Mil cretins, 2007. Awarded the Maria Àngels Anglada Prize, 2008.

==== Collected articles and essays ====
- El dia del senyor, 1984.
- Zzzzzzzz, 1987.
- La maleta turca, 1990.
- Hotel Intercontinental, 1991.
- No plantaré cap arbre, 1994.
- Del tot indefens davant dels hostils imperis alienígenes, 1998.
- Tot és mentida, 2000.
- El tema del tema, 2003.
- Catorze ciutats comptant-hi Brooklyn, 2004.
- Esplendor i glòria de la Internacional Papanates, 2010.
- Taula i barra. Diccionari de menjar i beure, 2017.

== Miscellany ==
He has also translated a large number of authors, including Truman Capote, J.D. Salinger, Ray Bradbury, Thomas Hardy, Harvey Fierstein, Ernest Hemingway, John Barth, Roald Dahl, Mary Shelley, Javier Tomeo, Arthur Miller, and Eric Bogosian.

Monzó has been diagnosed with Tourette syndrome.

== Books about Monzó ==
- Margarida Casacuberta and Marina Gustà (ed.): De Rusiñol a Monzó: humor i literatura. Barcelona: Publicacions de l'Abadia de Montserrat, 1996, ISBN 84-7826-695-X
- Christian Camps and Jordi Gàlvez (ed.): Quim Monzó. Montpellier: Université Paul Valéry, 1998. ISBN 978-2-84269-186-8 LO
- Antoni Mestres: Humor i persuasió: l’obra periodística de Quim Monzó. Alicante: Universitat d'Alacant, 2006. ISBN 84-611-1107-9
- Julià Guillamon (ed.): Monzó. Com triomfar a la vida. Barcelona: Galàxia Gutenberg / Cercle de Lectors, 2009, ISBN 978-84-8109-847-1. This is a book catalog published on the occasion of the exhibition devoted to the life and work of author (Arts Santa Mònica, Barcelona, between December 2009 and April 2010).
