= Albert Manent =

Spanish writer and activist (1930–2014)

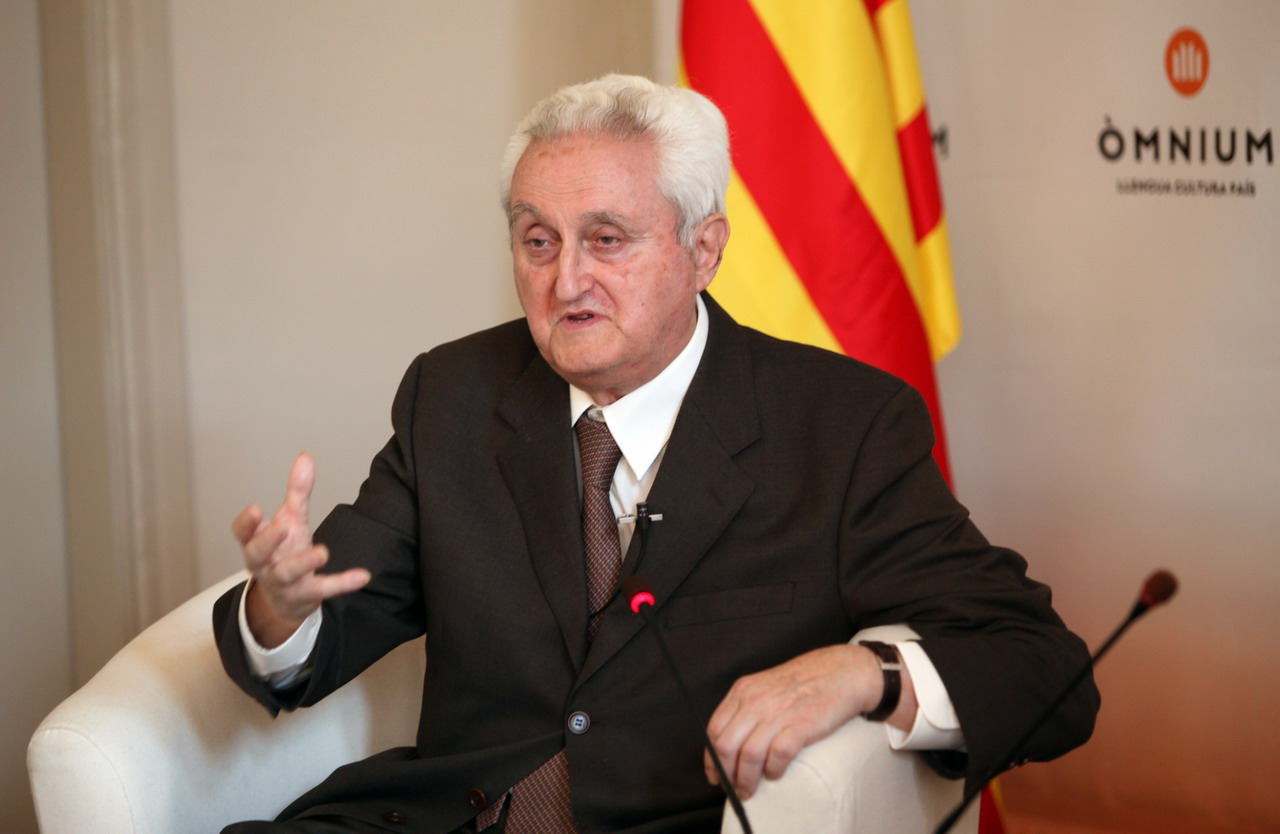

Albert Manent i Segimon (23 September 1930 – 14 April 2014) was a Catalan writer and cultural activist. He was mostly involved in the field of Catalan. Manent was the son of the writer Marià Manent. He graduated the subject of law and in Catalan philology. He was born in Premia de Dalt, Spain.

In 1995 he won the Ramon Llull Novel Award for his biography Marià Manent, biografía íntima i literària.

Manent died in Barcelona from an illness, aged 83.
