= Màrius Serra =

Spanish writer, journalist, translator and television maker

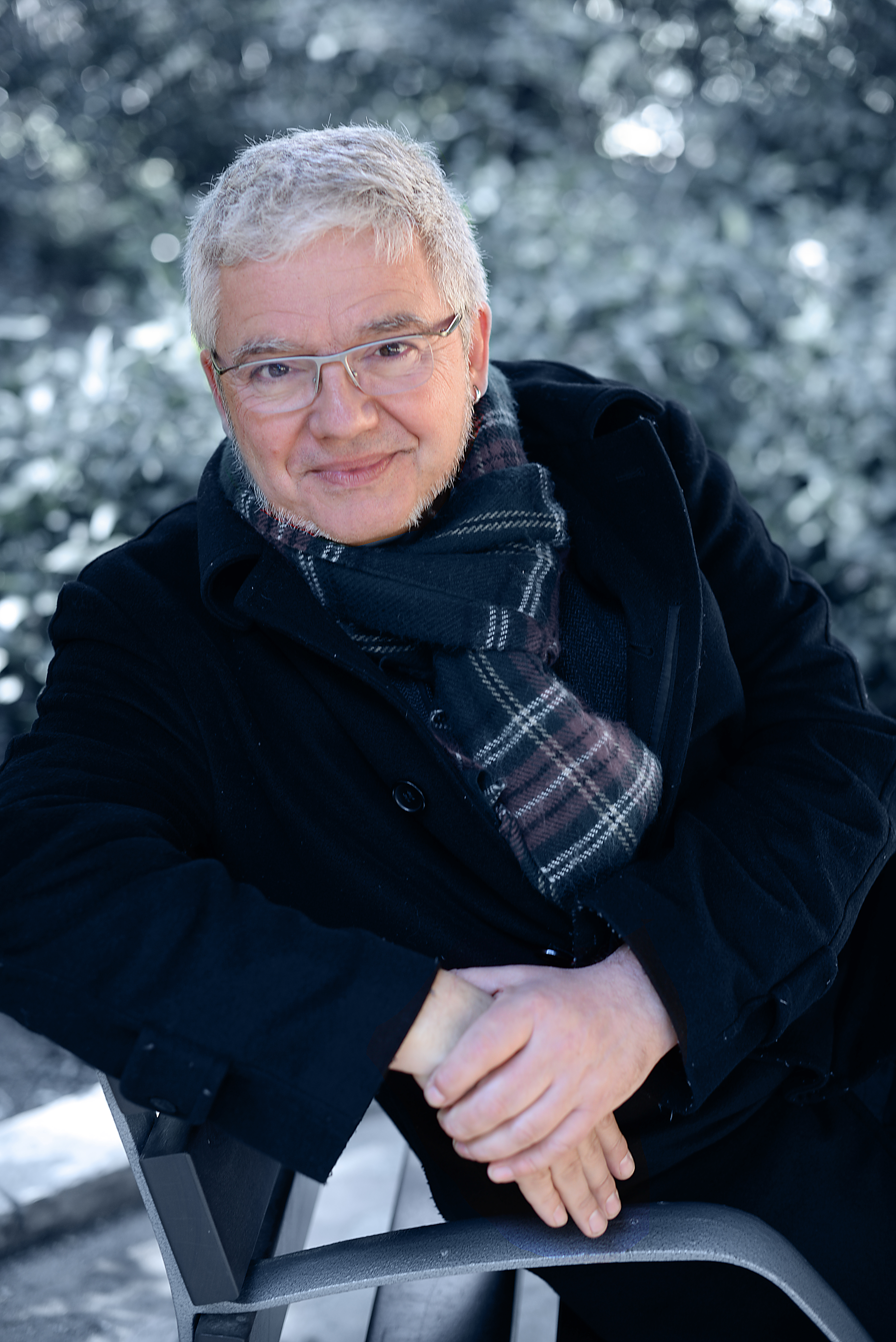
Màrius Serra in 2019

Màrius Serra i Roig (born May 1, 1963, in Barcelona, Catalonia) is a Spanish writer, journalist, translator and television maker.

Serra has a degree in English philology, and in addition to his writing career, is a professor of English. In 2006 he won one of the most prestigious literary awards in Catalan, the Ramon Llull Novel Award, for his novel Farsa (Farce). Since 2013 he's a member of the Institut d'Estudis Catalans.

Though he had already been publishing since 1987, he first became famous with the publication of the novel Mon oncle (My uncle) in 1994. He was also the host of a television show about books, Alexandria on Channel 33 in Catalonia. Serra also was a frequent contributor to the former Barcelona daily newspaper Avui. Besides, he has participated with his crosswords ("Crucigramarius") in the weekend program of Radio Nacional de España "No es un día cualquiera" for years, and has another section called "Enigmarius" in Catalunya Ràdio.

== Works ==
Conference of Màrius Serra at Cardedeu on the occasion of his book Quiet (Still).

=== Short stories ===
- 1987 Línia (Barcelona: Columna, 1987)
- 1988 Amnèsia (Barcelona: Pòrtic, 1988) award El Brot
- 1991 Tres és massa (Barcelona: Columna, 1991)
- 1993 Contagi (Barcelona: Cafè Central, 1993)
- 1998 La vida normal (Barcelona: Proa, 1998) award Ciutat de Barcelona de Literatura Catalana

=== Novels ===
- 1990 L'home del sac (Barcelona: Columna, 1990)
- 1996 Mon oncle (Barcelona: Proa, 1996) award Fundació Enciclopèdia Catalana de narrativa.
- 1999 Ablanatanalba (Barcelona: Edicions 62, 1999)
- 2003 Monocle (Barcelona: Mòbil Books-La Vanguardia, 2003)
- 2006 Farsa (Barcelona: Planeta, 2006)
- 2008 Quiet (Barcelona: Empúries, 2008)
- 2013 Plans de futur (Barcelona: Proa, 2013) award Sant Jordi.

=== Novel "bluetooth" ===
- 2007 La veritable història de Harald Bluetooth (The true story of Harakd Bluetooth), short story written and recorded to be downloaded by mobile.

=== Essays ===
- 2004 De com s'escriu una novel·la (How To Write a Novel), (Barcelona: Empúries, 2004)
- 2007 Enviar i Rebre (Send and Receive), (Barcelona: Columna, 2007) recull d'articles publicades a La Vanguardia i l'Avui

=== Crosswords ===
- 1991 Manual d'enigmística (Barcelona: Columna Edicions)
- 2000 Verbàlia (jocs de paraules i esforços de l'enginy literari) (Barcelona: Editorial Empúries, 2000, 2a edició 2001) Premis Octavi Pellissa, Serra d'Or i Lletra d'Or.
- 2002 Verbàlia.com (jugar, llegir, tal vegada escriure) (Barcelona: Editorial Empúries)
- 2004 Els 100 millors crucigrames de Màrius Serra i Pau Vidal, amb Pau Vidal (Barcelona: Editorial Empúries)
- 2004 Els 50 millors crucigrames amb enigma, amb Pau Vidal (Barcelona: Editorial Empúries)
- 2005 Els 65 millors crucigrames per tenir sort, amb Pau Vidal (Barcelona: Editorial Empúries)
- 2005 Els 66 crucigrames més lletrats (més 3 de lletruts), amb Pau Vidal (Barcelona: Editorial Empúries)
- 2010 Dicciomàrius (Barcelona: labutxaca)
- 2010 Verbàlia 2.0 (Barcelona: Editorial Empúries). Descripció: "A Verbàlia 2.0 trobareu mig centenar d'artificis verbals ben definits, historiats i exemplificats: des d'un logogrif o un anagrama, un calembour o un lipograma, fins a un palíndrom, una paronomàsia o un contrapet."

== Awards ==
- 1986 Ciutat d'Elx award for the story "Lletra menuda", included inside his collection of short stories, Línia (Line)
- 1987 Award El Brot for Amnèsia
- 1994 Foundation Enciclopèdia Catalana of narrative for Mon oncle (My uncle)
- 1999 Premi Ciutat de Barcelona for La vida normal
- 1999 Award Octavi Pellissa for Verbàlia
- 2001 Premi Crítica Serra d'Or d'estudi literari for Verbàlia
- 2001 Premi Lletra d'Or for Verbàlia
- 2006 Ramon Llull Novel Award for Farsa
- 2011 Award Memorial Lluís Companys of Fundació Josep Irla
- 2012 Premi Sant Jordi de Novel·la for Plans de futur

== Bibliography ==
- Biel Barnils: L'orgia verbal. Converses amb Màrius Serra (The verbal orgy. Conversations with Màrius Serra), (Barcelona: Edicions Dau, 2010)
