= Nuria Amat =

Spanish writer

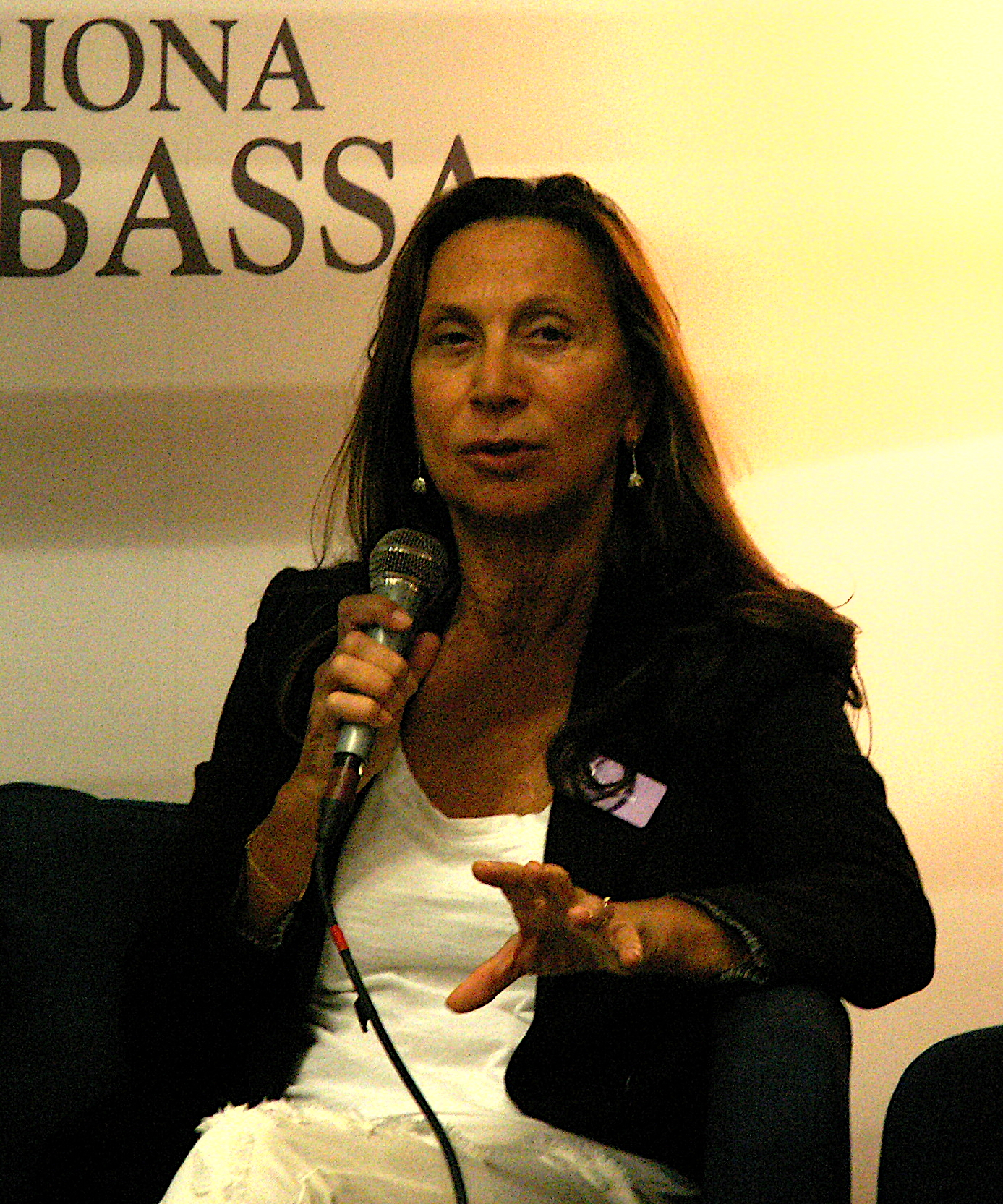
- Amat at the Göteborg Book Fair 2014
- Born: 1950 (age 75–76); Barcelona, Spain
- Education: Autonomous University of Barcelona (PhD)
- Occupations: Writer; librarian
- Writing career
- Notable awards: Ramon Llull Novel Award; 2011 Amor i guerra
- Website: nuriaamat.com

Nuria Amat Noguera, spelled in Catalan as Núria Amat i Noguera (born 1950) is a Spanish writer and librarian who writes in Spanish and Catalan. She is the recipient of the 2011 Ramon Llull Novel Award.

== Early life and education ==
Nuria Amat was born in 1950, in Barcelona. She gained a degree in Spanish studies, then completed a doctorate in information science at the Autonomous University of Barcelona.

== Career ==
Amat wrote some studies on library science, worked as a librarian, and taught library science at the University of Barcelona. Her first non-scholarly published work was a tome of poetry called Pan de boda (1979). Amat went on to write essays, short story collections and novels in Spanish. She was part of the Barcelona literary scene of the 1970s and 1980s, maintaining friendships with such writers as Juan Goytisolo, Carlos Fuentes, Josep María Castellet or Enrique Vila-Matas.

Amat's literary work is often complex in form and focused on the processes of reading and writing, frequently employing metafiction. Her body of work includes the novel Todos somos Kafka, which both reflects on the literary tradition and its own structure; it was called "magnificent" by Carlos Fuentes in El País. In 2002, Amat won the Premio Ciudad de Barcelona for Reina de América – a novel about a Spanish woman writer living through a civil war in Colombia. Her books have been translated to Arabic, English, French, Italian, Hungarian, Portuguese, Romanian, Swedish, Czech and Polish.

Apart from writing in Spanish, Amat has also been published in Catalan. She has written a theatre play called Pat's Room (1997) and a novel Amor i guerra about the assassination of Leon Trotsky by Ramón Mercader, with whom she is distantly related from the mother's side. The novel brought her the Ramon Llull Novel Award 2011. Amat started writing notes for the novel in both Catalan and Spanish, but then decided to write the whole book in Catalan, later creating a Spanish version.

Amat has been vocal about rejecting the normalization of the Catalan language carried out by the Generalitat de Catalunya.

== Literary works ==
=== Fiction ===
- Narciso y Armonía, 1982
- El ladrón de libros, 1988
- Amor Breve, 1990
- Monstruos, 1991
- Todos somos Kafka, 1993
- Viajar es muy difícil, 1995
- La intimidad, 1997
- El país del alma, 1999
- El siglo de las mujeres, 2000
- Reina de América, 2001; Eng. edition: Queen Cocaine, trans. by Peter Bush, 2005
- Deja que la vida llueva sobre mí, 2007
- Amor i guerra, 2011
- Amor y Guerra, 2012
- El sanatorio, 2016

=== Poetry ===
- Pan de boda, 1979
- Amor infiel, 2004
- Poemas impuros, 2008

=== Other ===
- Pat's Room, 1997 – theatre play
- Memorias de una mujer libre, 2022 – autobiography
