= Òscar Andreu i Fernández =

Catalonian broadcaster and comedian

Òscar Andreu
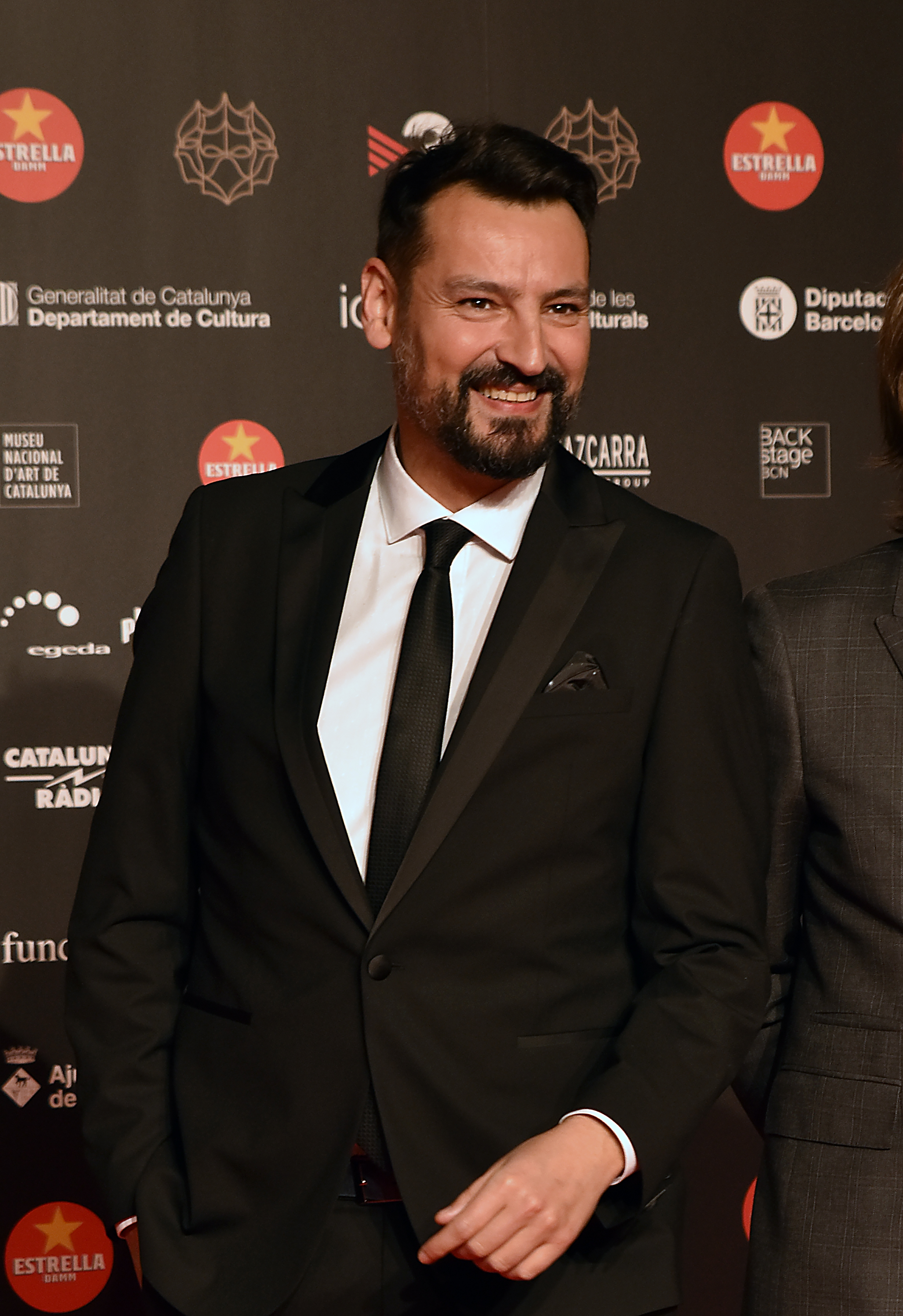
- Òscar Andreu at the XIV Gaudí Awards (2022)
- Born: April 7, 1975 (age 51); Terrassa, Catalonia
- Education: Pompeu Fabra University
- Occupations: Broadcaster, comedian, writer, singer
- Years active: 2000–present

Òscar Andreu is a broadcaster, comedian, writer and singer from Catalonia. He is co-director and scriptwriter of the programmes La competència on RAC1 and La nit dels Òscars on TV3, together with Òscar Dalmau, forming a creative duo since meeting while studying Audiovisual communication at Pompeu Fabra University. He is also the lead singer of the group La Banda Municipal del Polo Norte.

== Biography ==
The son of a textile worker father from a town in the Sierra Morena and a self-employed mother from Fraga who raised three children, Òscar Andreu was born in Terrassa and studied at the high school of the Mancomunitat de Sabadell i Terrassa. He studied Audiovisual Communication at Pompeu Fabra University together with Òscar Dalmau, forming a prominent comic duo. He has been a screenwriter for the TV3 programmes Polònia, Crackòvia and Vinagre, and a collaborator on the radio programme Minoria absoluta on RAC1, all except Vinagre produced by Minoria Absoluta.

Since September 2009, he has been co-director and scriptwriter of La competència, a midday humour programme on RAC1. He voices fictional characters such as Jean-Paul Desgrava, Mohamed Jordi, Duque de Fire, L'Avi sense nom, en Martinet de Cal Pobre, Richard Serra, and el Primo, and performs satirical impressions of known figures like Justo Molinero and David Bisbal. The writing team included Òscar Dalmau, Natza Farré, Oriol de Balanzó and Tomàs Fuentes.

Since 2024, the programme continues under his co-direction with a renewed team of scriptwriters: Oriol de Balanzó, Noelia Karanezi, and Manel Vidal.

On television, he presented and directed La competència en color on 8tv, first aired on 30 September 2011. On 16 October 2011, he premiered the animated series Jokebox, co-directed with Òscar Dalmau. He contributed to the satirical TV3 news show Està passant from its debut in September 2017 until October 2018, returning in September 2020.

He also presented Tot torna with Òscar Dalmau, premiered on 3Cat on 12 December 2024, reviewing the last 40 years with humour.

On 4 March 2013, he published his first book, 17 maneres de matar un home amb un tovalló. In 2017 he published his second book, Com es bull una granota i altres relats.

At the end of 2018, Andreu and Dalmau made their first joint television appearance as a comic duo presenting the late-night show La nit dels Òscars on TV3, which was cancelled in April 2019.

=== Recent activity and Catalan advocacy ===
In 2024, he premiered his first solo theatrical show, Crida als ocells de colors llampants, written, directed and performed by himself, combining humour and reflections on his linguistic biography and the situation of the Catalan language. The play, described by the author as a "fun sociolinguistic show", reflects on bilingualism in Catalonia and warns about its imposition.

=== Awards and recognition ===
- 2013: Ondas Award for Best Radio Programme for La competència (RAC1), presented by Òscar Andreu and Òscar Dalmau.
