= Maria Antònia Oliver Cabrer =

Spanish writer (1946–2022)

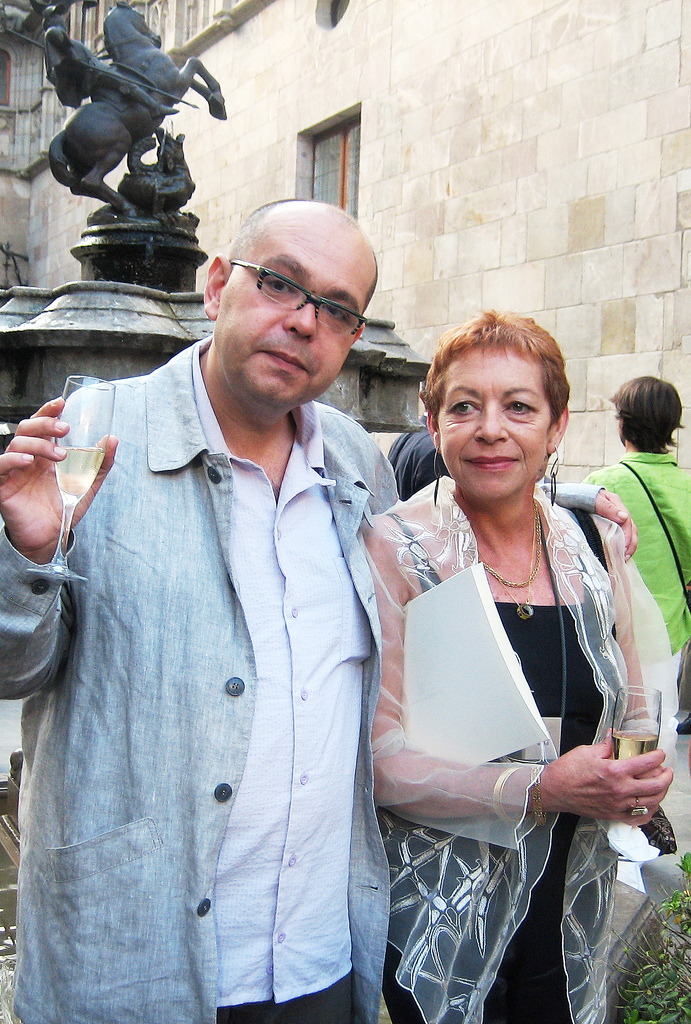
- Oliver (right) with poet Antoni Albalat Salanova
- Born: 4 December 1946; Manacor, Balearic Islands, Spain
- Died: 10 February 2022 (aged 75); Sancellas, Balearic Islands, Spain
- Spouse: Jaume Fuster
- Writing career
- Language: Spanish, Catalan, Castilian
- Genres: Novel, short story, translator

Maria Antònia Oliver Cabrer (4 December 1946 – 10 February 2022) was a Spanish writer. Her work has been translated into German, English, Spanish, Galician, French, Portuguese, and Russian. She was honored with the Premi d'Honor de les Lletres Catalanes in 2016.

== Life ==
Born in Manacor, Balearic Islands, Oliver was a resident of Barcelona from 1969. Oliver was known for her novels and short stories, and was also a Castilian and Catalan language translator. In the 1980s, Oliver joined a number of other Catalan-language writers to form the Ofèlia Dracs collective, looking to bring attention to, and broaden the output of deepening Catalan literature.

Oliver's first work was published in 1970. While most of her work has been for adult readers, some is aimed at children and youth. In addition to novel and short stories, she has written plays (Negroni de ginebra ; 1991), screenplays, as well as stories for radio (Catalunya Ràdio) and television (TV3; TVE Catalunya). She has worked for El Correo Catalán, Diario de Mallorca, Última hora, and Diari de Barcelona. Writing in Catalan, many of her works have been translated into Castilian, German, English, Galician and Russian.

Oliver was married to the writer Jaume Fuster. She has served as dean of Institució de les Lletres Catalanes (2001-2004). She died on 10 February 2022, at the age of 75.

== Selected works ==
- Cròniques d'un mig estiu (1970)
- Cròniques de la molt anomenada ciutat de Montcarrà (1972)
- El vaixell d'Iràs i no Tornaràs (1976)
- Punt d'arròs (1979)
- Crineres de foc (1985)
- Estudi en lila (1985)
- Antípodes (1988)
- Joana E. (1992)
- El sol que fa l'ànec (1994)
- Amor de cans (1994)
- Tallats de lluna (2000)

== Awards ==
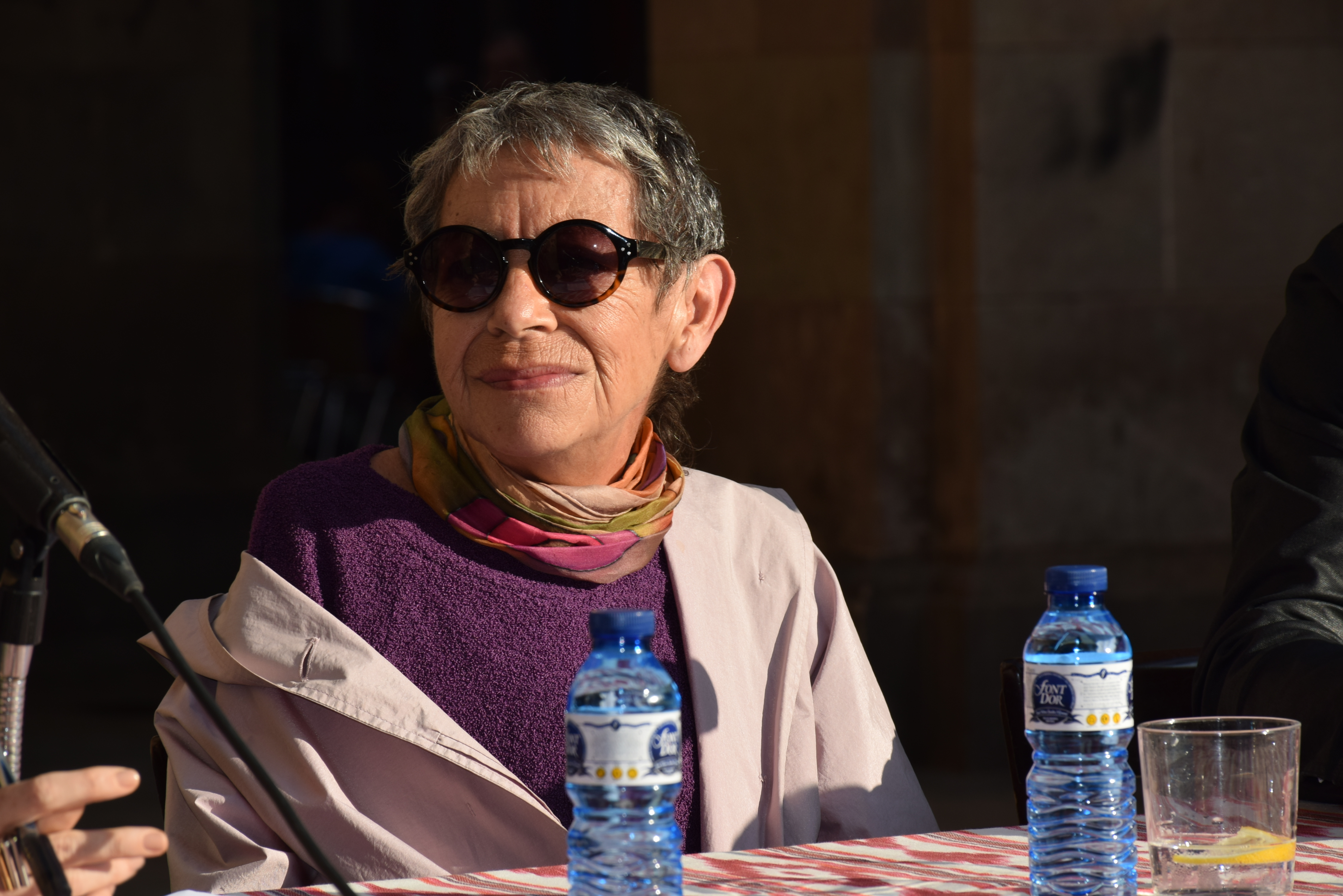
Maria Antònia Oliver in 2016

- Prudenci Bertrana Prize
- 2001, Outstanding Achievement Award of the Llibre Setmana in Catalan
- 2003, Ramon Llull Prize, Balearic Government
- Finalist for the Sant Jordi Prize (1984) for Crineres de foc
- Prize for Catalan Literature of the Generalitat of Catalonia (1985) for the translation of Moby Dick
- Jaume Fuster Prize for Catalan Writers (2004)
- Premi d'Honor de les Lletres Catalanes (2016)
