= Ofèlia Dracs =

Literary collective of Catalan writers

Ofèlia Dracs was a literary collective of Catalan writers. Set up in 1976 or 1977, the name originates from the initials of the surnames of its founders: Miquel Desclot, Carles Reig, Josep Albanell, Jaume Cabré and Joaquim Soler; it also included Jaume Fuster, Xavier Romeu and Maria Antònia Oliver Cabrer.

The collective circled around a nucleus of authors. Including the founders, these were Joan Rendé, Joaquim Carbó, Vicenç Villatoro, Margarida Aritzeta, and Isidre Grau. There were occasional contributors (Quim Monzó, Josep Maria Illa, Carme Riera, Joana Escobedo in the early years; Assumpció Cantalozella and Roser Vernet joined in the latter period). After the group's failed first work, Desclot and Reig departed it.

Hoping to reach a new readership in the Catalan language, the group published genre literature, particularly crime, science fiction, erotica, as well as a book of gastronomy, arguing that Catalan literature had the same right to a complete range of narratives as other languages. Furthermore, they resisted assimilation into the cultural 'normalisation' demanded under the Franco regime; instead, they were feminist, socialist and separatist.

In the collections of Dracs, the writers were anonymous and would later be revealed only when their works reappeared in their own named publications.

Deu pometes té el pomer (Ten little apples has the apple tree) was the first publication of the collective. The book of erotic stories won the Premi La Sonrisa Vertical (Vertical Smile Prize) in 1980.

The collection of detective stories Negra i consentida (1983) comprised works both by authors who had previously published in the genre as well as first-time crime story writers, such as Antoni Serra and Maria Antònia Oliver Cabrer, and provided scope for their various interpretations of the genre.

== Selected works ==
- Deu pometes té el pomer. Barcelona: Tusquets. 1980. ISBN 978-8472239951. (Genre: erotica)
- Lovecraft, Lovecraft. Barcelona: Edicions 62. 1981. ISBN 978-8429717433. (Genre: horror)
- Negra i consentida. Barcelona: Editorial Laia. 1983. ISBN 978-8472224261. (Genre: crime)
- Essa Efa. recull de contes intergalàctics. Barcelona: Editorial Laia. 1985. (Genre: science fiction)
- Boccato di cardinali. València: Edicions Tres i Quatre. 1985. (Theme: gastronomy)
- Misteri de reina. València: Edicions Tres i Quatre. 1994. (Genre: crime)

== Bibliography ==
- Aramburu, Diana (2019). Resisting Invisibility: Detecting the Female Body in Spanish Crime Fiction. University of Toronto Press. ISBN 978-1-4875-0459-5.
- Bermúdez, Silvia (2002). "Let's Talk About Sex? From Almudena Grandes to Lucía Etxebarria, the Volatile Values of the Spanish Literary Market". In Kathleen Mary Glenn; Ofelia Ferrán (eds.). Women's Narrative and Film in Twentieth-century Spain: A World of Difference(s). Psychology Press. ISBN 978-0-415-93633-0.
- Gregori, Alfons (2019). "Fantasy, History, and Politics: Jaume Fuster's Trilogy, or the Undone Catalan Nation". In Pompeu Casanovas; Montserrat Corretger; Vicent Salvador (eds.). The Rise of Catalan Identity: Social Commitment and Political Engagement in the Twentieth Century. Springer International Publishing. ISBN 978-3-030-18144-4.
