= Nadia Ghulam =

Afghan woman (born 1985)

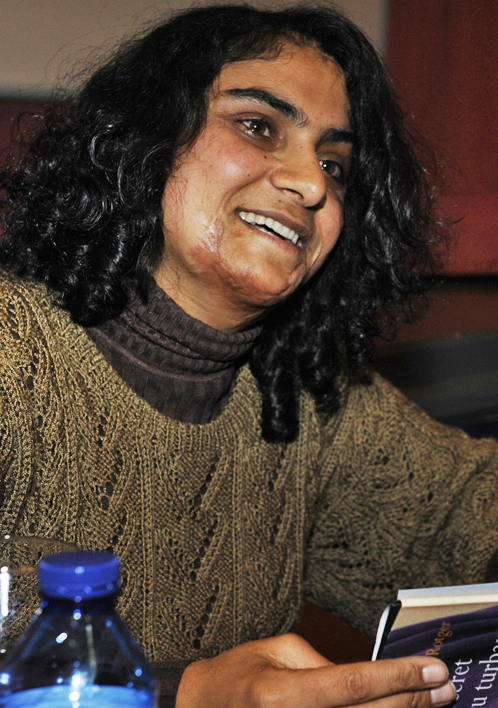
Nadia Ghulam in 2012

Nadia Ghulam Dastgir (born 8 June 1985 in Kabul) is an Afghan woman who spent ten years posing as her dead brother to evade the Taliban's strictures against women. Her book about her experiences, written with Agnès Rotger and published in 2010, El secret del meu turbant (The Secret of My Turban), won the Prudenci Bertrana Prize for fiction.

== Life and publications ==
In 1993, a portion of Ghulam's family's home was destroyed by a bomb. She spent a total of two years in different hospitals to treat the injuries she sustained in the bombing. After the Taliban's insurgency took control of Kabul, at the age of 11 Nadia decided with her mother to disguise herself as a boy, adopting the identity of her dead brother Zelmai, so that she could leave the house alone and work to support her family. As a boy, she studied the Koran and became an assistant in a mosque, and at 16 was allowed to resume her schooling.

With the outbreak of renewed war in Afghanistan at the beginning of the 21st century, Ghulam's story became known to some westerners, and was the basis for the 2003 film Osama. In 2006 the Associació per als Drets Humans a l'Afganistan (Association for Human Rights in Afghanistan), an international NGO in Kabul, enabled her relocation to Catalonia, Spain where she received facial reconstructive surgery.

In 2010, with Agnès Rotger, she published El secret del meu turbant (The Secret of My Turban), which won the Prudenci Bertrana Prize for fiction. In 2014, with Joan Soler i Amigó, she published Contes que em van curar (Tales That Healed Me), which was awarded the Mención Especial Mare Terra, and in 2016, with Javier Diéguez, La primera estrella de la noche (The First Star of the Night). In 2016 she earned a bachelor's degree in social education, and in 2019 a master's degree in international development. She also appears in Nadia, a dramatised documentary on her story by Carles Fernández Giua.

In 2016, Ghulam established Ponts per la pau (Bridges for Peace), an NGO that provides language courses for migrants in Catalonia and also assists school children in Afghanistan with materials and reading assignments.

== Education ==
- 2009: Associate degree in Computer Science, Institut La Pineda, Badalona (Spain)
- 2011: Associate degree in Social Integration, Institut Eugeni d’Ors de Badalona (Spain)
- 2016: Bachelor's Degree in Social Education, URL Facultat Pere Tarrés, Barcelona (Spain)
- 2019: Master's Degree in International Development, Institut Barcelona D'Estudis Internacionals (Spain)

== AWARDS ==
- Premio de Memoria y Convivencia de Gobierno de Navarra 2025
- Memorial Joan XXIII for Peace 2023
- Memorial per la Pau Josep i Liesel Vidal 2023
- Women of the Year Award: Women of Peace, look! Magazine Vienna 2021
- Socio-Educational and E-Inclusive Action, Esplai Foundation for Committed Citizenship 2020
- Premis Ones Mención especial Mare Terra de la XXVI edición de los Premis Ones Mediterránia for activism and peacebuilding in Catalonia 2020
- Primis Trencant Invisibilitats for Social Transformation and Overcoming Gender Stereotypes, Municipal Council of Women Badalona 2016
- Girona Literary Award: Prudenci Bertrana Prize for “El secret del meu turbante” 2010
