= Pau Faner Coll =

Spanish novelist and painter (born 1949)

Pau Faner Coll (born 1949) is a Spanish novelist and painter. He won numerous prizes, such as the 1988 Ramon Llull Novel Award, for his literary works which are usually centered on mythical themes.

== Works ==
=== Short narrative ===
- 1972 Contes menorquins
- 1976 El camp de les tulipes
- 1981 Amb la mort al darrera
- 1984 Lady Valentine
- 1986 AEIOU
- 1995 La núvia del vent
- 1997 Roses de paper
- 2003 Caps de rata
- 2005 Per no oblidar-te

=== Children's narratives ===
- 1983 El violí màgic
- 1985 Ses ganes de riure
- 1991 L'illa dels homes (La dama de la mitja ametlla I)
- 1991 El camí de roques negres (La dama de la mitja ametlla II)
- 1997 Les noces del cel i de la terra (La dama de la mitja ametlla III)

=== Novels ===
- 1974 L'arcàngel
- 1976 Un regne per a mi
- 1979 Potser només la fosca
- 1983 La vall d'Adam
- 1986 El cavaller i la fortuna
- 1986 Viatge de nit
- 1986 Flor de sal
- 1988 Moro de rei
- 1993 Mal camí i bon senyor
- 1996 Per una mica d'amor
- 2004 Aetara
