= Toni Soler i Guasch =

Spanish journalist and writer (born 1965)

Toni Soler
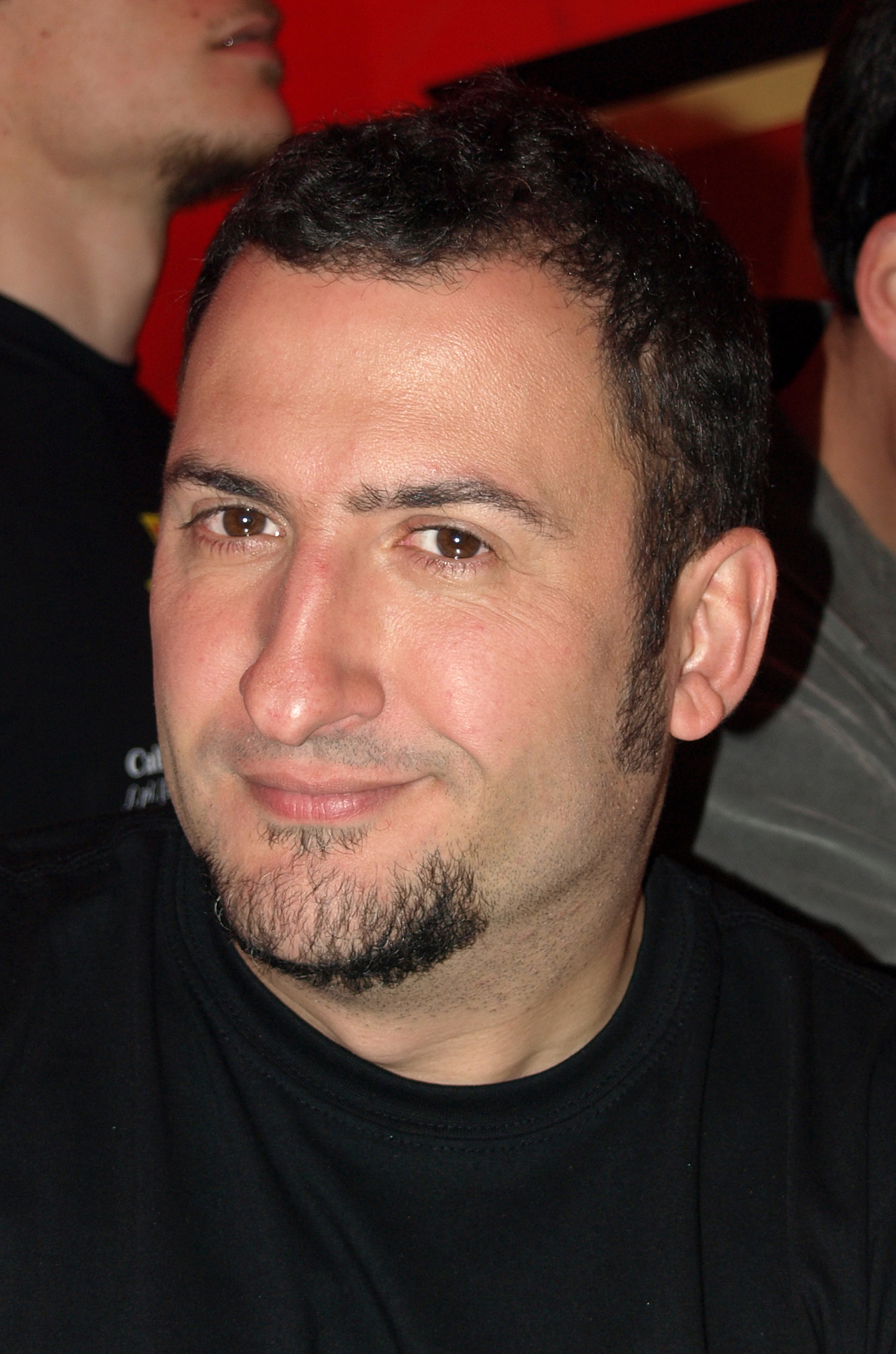
- Toni Soler
- Born: 1965 (age 60–61); Figueres
- Occupations: writer, producer, tv presenter
- Notable work: Polònia

Toni Soler i Guasch (born June 4, 1965, Figueres) is a Spanish journalist, television producer and writer.

== Career ==
With a degree in Contemporary History, he is the creator of the TV show Polònia, on air in Catalan public television channel TV3 since 2006, and currently is the presenter of the daily satirical programme Està passant on the same channel since 2017.

He is director of Minoria Absoluta, a content production company responsible for tv shows such as Polònia and Crackòvia on TV3, and other audiovisual products, including several fiction and documentary films.

He is one of the promoters of the Ara newspaper, born in 2010, where he writes regularly. He is also the director of the history magazine El Món d'Ahir.

As a writer, he is the author of a dozen of books in various genres.

His programs have received several awards, including three Ondas awards, the City of Barcelona Award (2005) and the Catalan National Prize for Communication (2008).

== Private life ==
His sister is the writer Sílvia Soler.

== Published works ==
Works published in Catalan language:

=== Non-fiction ===
- 1994: Pretèrit Imperfecte
- 1996: Roca, l'últim segon (with Andreu Farràs)
- 1998: Badalona davant del mirall
- 2005: La Penya en 75 paraules
- 2008: Amb llengua o sense
- 2009: L'última carta de Companys

=== Narrative ===
- 1996: Els mals moments
- 1997: Diccionari poc útil
- 1998: Història de Catalunya (modèstia a part)
- 2003: Vota'm inútil
- 2003: Objectiu la pau: 34 dies inoblidables
- 2011: 14 d'abril. Macià contra Companys
- 2018: El tumor (Anagrama) ISBN 978-84-339-1566-5
- 2020: Un bon cel (La Campana)
