= Sílvia Soler =

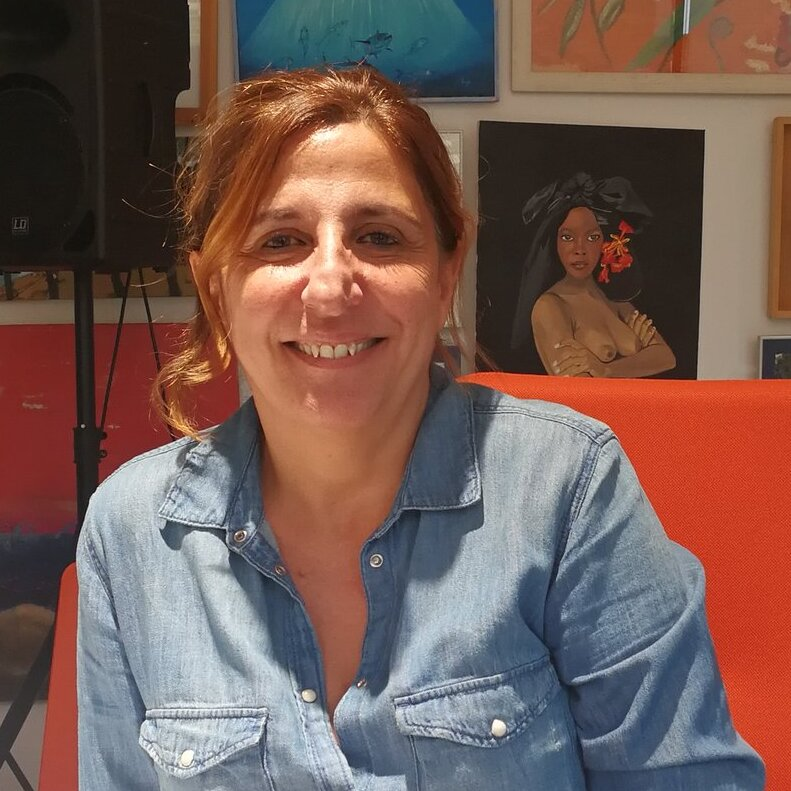
- Soler in 2025
- Born: Sílvia Soler i Guasch; 1961 (age 64–65); Figueres
- Known for: Writing

Sílvia Soler i Guasch (born 1961) is a Spanish writer and journalist who writes in Catalan. In 2013, her novel L’estiu que comença was awarded the Ramon Llull Novel Award.

== Early life and education ==
Sílvia Soler i Guasch was born on 5 October, 1961, in Figueres. Her mother is the writer Carme Guasch, her brother the journalist Toni Soler i Guasch. She has a degree in information science.

== Career ==
As a journalist, Soler has worked for the radio, press, and television. She has written for such newspapers as Avui, Punt Diari and Presència. With time, she began to put more focus on book writing.

Soler has written over twenty books, chiefly novels. Her fiction debut, Semblava de vidre (1984), won the Recull award. She is also the recipient of Fiter i Rossell Prize (ca) for Mira’m als ulls and the Prudenci Bertrana Prize for Petons de diumenge. In 2013, Soler was awarded the Ramon Llull Novel Award for L’estiu que comença, a novel about a fifty years long friendship between a man and a woman.

Soler's novel 39+1. L’edat en què una dona sap que l’home de la seva vida és ella mateixa (2005) was adapted for television.

== Works ==
=== Fiction ===
- Semblava de vidre,1984
- Arriben els ocells de nit, 1985
- Ramblejar, 1992
- El centre exacte de la nit, 1992
- El son dels volcans, 1999
- L’arbre de Judes, 2001
- Mira’m als ulls, 2004
- 39+1. L’edat en què una dona sap que l’home de la seva vida és ella mateixa, 2005
- 39+1+1: Enamorar-se és fàcil, si saps com, 2007
- Petons de diumenge, 2008
- Una família fora de sèrie, 2010
- Un creuer fora de sèrie, 2012
- Bàsquet, scrabble i tu, 2012 (young adult fiction written with son, Ferran Muñoz)
- L’estiu que comença, 2013
- Un any i mig, 2015
- Els vells amics, 2017
- Rellotges de sol, 2018
- El fibló, 2019
- Nosaltres, després, 2021
- Estimada Gris, 2023
- Cor fort, 2025

=== Non-fiction ===
- Àngel Casas Show: anecdotari secret, 1983
- El gust de ser mare, 2004
