= Joan Oliver Araujo =

Spanish author (born 1959)

Joan Oliver Araujo (born 1959, in Palma de Mallorca) is a Spanish author, who holds the chair of Constitutional Law in the University of the Balearic Islands (UIB).

Among his writings are El recurso de amparo (Universitat de les Illes Balears, 1986); El sistema político de la Constitución española de 1931 (1991); La objeción de conciencia al servicio militar (Editorial Cívitas-Universitat de les Illes Balears, 1993); Política y Derecho (Tirant lo Blanch, 1996); La Constitución día a día (Tirant lo Blanch, 2003) and Los sistemas electorales autonómicos (Generalitat de Catalunya, 2011).

== Education ==
Oliver Araujo's honours degree and doctorate were both awarded with distinction. In 1983 he was awarded a scholarship by the Faculté Internationale de Droit Comparé (Strasbourg), and in 1988 extended his studies in the Department of Constitutional Law of the Università degli Studi di Siena.

== Career ==
Oliver Araujo has been Professor of Constitutional Law at UIB since 1992, and a member of the Consultative Council of the Balearic Islands since 1993. He has been President of that Council and Secretary General of UIB. He won the Law Prize 1981, the Nicolás Pérez Serrano Prize 1985, and the Josep Maria Vilaseca i Marcet Prize 2010. He is Distinguished Professor at the National University of San Marcos (Peru), Visiting Professor of the Technological University of Peru, and Distinguished Guest of the City Council of Xalapa (Mexico). He teaches courses and gives seminars at various universities in Europe and Latin America. He is a member of the es:Colegio de Abogados de Madrid.

== Bibliography ==
=== Oliver Araujo's works ===
- Oliver Araujo, Joan (2011). Los sistemas electorales autonómicos (PDF). Generalitat de Cataluña. Institut d’Estudis Autonòmics. ISBN 978-84-393-8793-0.

=== Secondary sources ===
- Ballester Cardell, María (1994). "La objeción de conciencia al servicio militar". Revista de Estudios Políticos (83). Centro de Estudios Políticos y Constitucionales: 361–366. ISSN 0048-7694.
- Calafell Ferrá, Vicente Juan (2004). "La Constitución día a día". Revista de Estudios Políticos (123). Centro de Estudios Políticos y Constitucionales: 423–426. ISSN 0048-7694.
- Gálvez Muñoz, Luis A. (2012). "Oliver Araujo, Joan. Los sistemas electorales autonómicos. Barcelona : Generalitat de Catalunya, 2011". Teoría y Realidad Constitucional (30). Centro de Estudios Ramón Areces: 585–589. ISSN 2174-8950. Archived from the original on 2023-04-01.
- Oehling de los Reyes, Alberto (2012). "Joan Oliver Araújo, Los sistemas electorales autonómicos, Generalidad de Cataluña, Instituto de Estudios Autonómicos, Barcelona, 2011". Anuario Iberoamericano de Justicia Constitucional (16): 704–709. ISSN 1138-4824.
- Ribas Maura, Andrés (1986). "El recurso de amparo de Joan Oliver Araujo". Cuadernos de la Facultad de Derecho. 13. Universitat de les Illes Balears: 165–167. ISSN 2386-7531.
