= Gabriel Janer Manila =

Spanish university professor, translator and writer

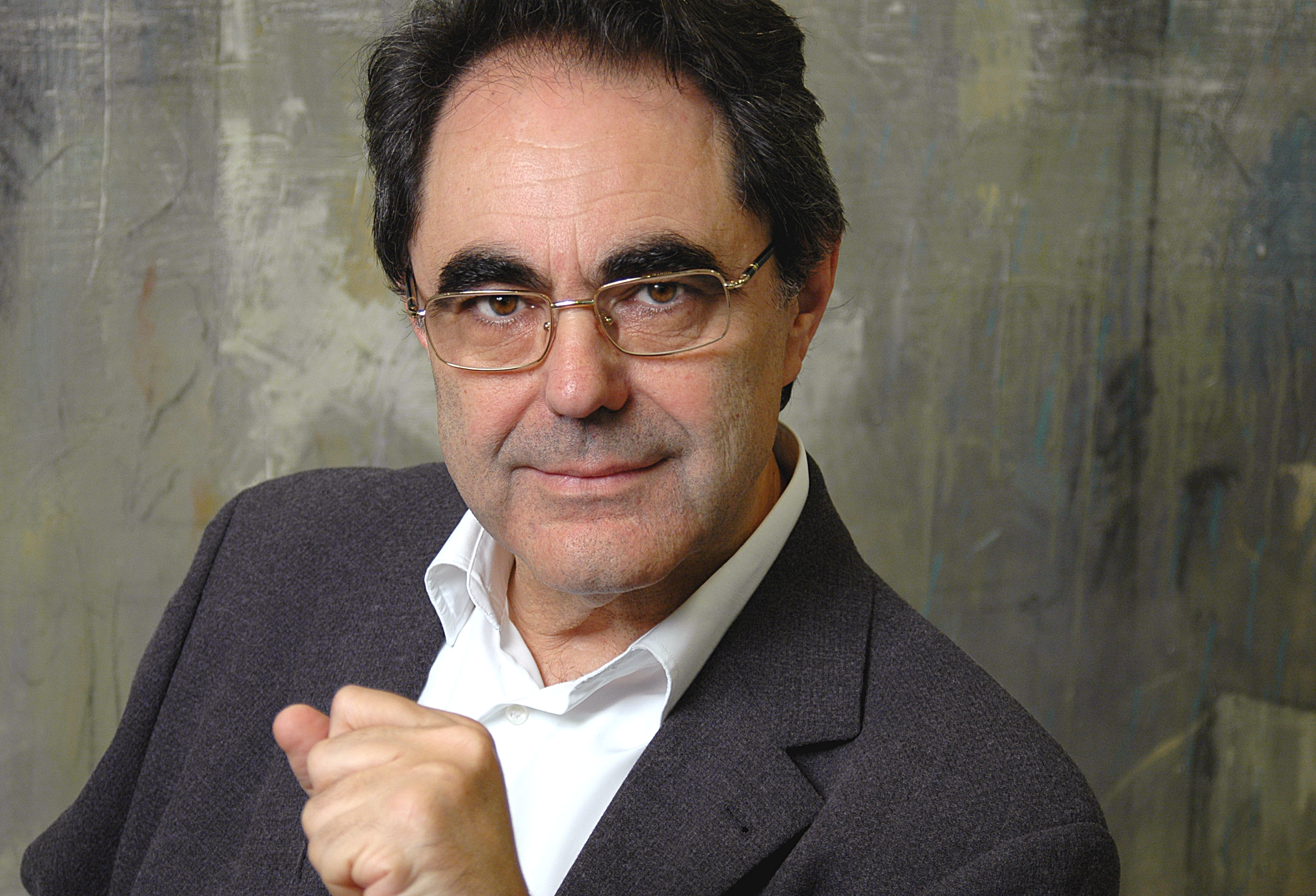
Portrait of Gabriel Janer Manila

Gabriel Janer Manila (born November 1, 1940, in Algaida, Mallorca, Spain) is a Spanish university professor, translator and writer. He is well-known across Spain for being a prolific author who has worked in almost every genre.

His work has been translated into several languages, including German, English, Spanish, Basque and Galician. Manila combines his literary career with teaching at the University of the Balearic Islands.

== Awards ==
He was the winner of the 2007 Premi Ramon Llull, the most prestigious prize in Catalan literature, for his novel Tigers. In 1998 he was awarded the Cross of Saint George of the Generalitat (Parliament) of Catalonia.

== Personal life ==
He is the father of Maria de la Pau Janer, also a writer.

== Works ==
=== Short fiction ===
- 1972 El cementiri de les roses (The Cemetery of Roses)
- 1988 La finestra (The Window)
- 1991 Contes per als qui dormen amb un ull obert (Stories for those who Sleep with One Eye Open)
- 2002 Vola, vola Josh! (Fly, fly Josh!)
- 2004 L'illa i una nit (The Island and a Night)

=== Novels ===
- 1969 L'abisme (The Abyss)
- 1970 El silenci (The Silence)
- 1971 Han plogut panteres
- 1972 La capitulació (The Capitulation)
- 1972 Els alicorns
- 1973 L'agonia dels salzes (The Agony of Willows)
- 1976 El rei Gaspar (King Gaspar)
- 1977 Tango
- 1977 La cerimònia (The Ceremony)
- 1979 Com si els dits m'haguessin tornat cuques de llum
- 1983 Diumenge, després de lluna plena (Sunday, After the Full Moon)
- 1983 La Serpentina
- 1984 El corsari de l'illa dels conills
- 1984 Angeli musicanti
- 1985 Els rius de Babilònia (The Rivers of Babylon)
- 1987 La dama de les boires (The Lady of the Fog)
- 1987 Els peixos no es pentinen
- 1987 Violeta, el somriure innocent de la pluja (Violet, the Innocent Smile of the Rain)
- 1987 Tot quant veus és el mar (All You See is the Sea)
- 1988 Diu que n'era un rei
- 1988 Els rius dormen als núvols (Rivers Sleep in the Clouds)
- 1989 El Palau de vidre (The Glass Palace)
- 1990 Arlequí, el titella que tenia els cabells blaus (Harlequin, the Puppet who had Blue Hair)
- 1990 La perla verda (The Green Pearl)
- 1991 Els rius de la lluna (The Rivers of the Moon)
- 1992 Paradís d'orquídies (Orchid Paradise)
- 1993 Han cremat el mar (Burned the Sea)
- 1993 Lluna creixent sobre el Tàmesi (Moon Rising over the Thames)
- 1995 Viatge a l'interior del fred (Journey to the Center of Cold)
- 1995 El terror de la nit (Terror of the Night)
- 1996 Aquella dona que vingué de Mart (That woman who came from Mars)
- 1996 La vida, tan obscura (Life, So Dark)
- 1997 Els jardins incendiats (The Gardens Burned)
- 1999 La invenció de la primavera (The Invention of Spring)
- 2000 Estàtues sobre el mar (Statues on the Sea)
- 2000 Samba per a un "menino da rua"
- 2002 George. El perfum dels cedres (George. The Scent of Cedar)
- 2003 Daniel i les bruixes salvatges (Daniel and the Wild Witches)
- 2005 Èxtasi (Ecstasy)
- 2007 Tigres (Tigers)

=== Essays and Other Prose Works ===
- 1975 Petita memòria d'un mestre del meu temps (Little Memorial of a Master of My Time)
- 1975 Implicació social i humana del teatre (The Social and Human Engagement of the Theater)
- 1979 Aucells esquius
- 1979 Sexe i cultura a Mallorca: el cançoner (Sex and Culture in Mallorca: The Song)
- 1980 Història de l'illa de Mallorca (History of the Island of Mallorca)
- 1980 La ciutat de Mallorca: al recer d'una badia mediterrània (The City of Mallorca: in Search of a Mediterranean Bay)
- 1982 Sexe i cultura a Mallorca: la narrativa oral i el teatre (Sex and Culture in Mallorca: The Narrative and Theater)
- 1982 Cultura popular i ecologia del llenguatge (Popular Culture and Ecology of Language)
- 1985 Pregoner de quimeres (The Crier of Chimeras)
- 1986 Pedagogia de la imaginació poètica (Pedagogy of the Poetic Imagination)
- 1990 Satan estima Berlín (Satan loves Berlin)
- 1991 L'educació de l'home que riu
- 1995 Literatura infantil i experiència cognitiva (Children’s Literature and Learning Experience)
- 1995 Les cançons eròtiques del camp de Mallorca (The Erotic Songs of the Countryside of Mallorca)
- 1996 Com una rondalla: els treballs i la vida de Mossèn Alcover (The Life and Work of Mossèn Alcover)
- 1999 L'infant selvàtic de Sierra Morena (The Wild Child of Sierra Morena)
- 1999 Les festes llunyanes
- 2005 Costa i Llobera: territoris de l'ànima (Costa and Llobera: Territories of the Soul)

=== Plays ===
- 1981 Les aventures d'en Pere Pistoles (The Adventures of Peter Pistols)
- 1981 La princesa embruixada (The Haunted Princess)
