= Alguna Pregunta Més? =

- Also known as: APM?
- Genre: Comedy; Zapping
- Created by: Antoni Bassas; Xavier Bosch
- Written by: Albert Monreal; Albert Duran; Manel Piñeiro
- Directed by: Guillem Sans; Aniol Florensa; Yanina Montalvo
- Starring: Manel Piñeiro (2009-2016); Lluís Jutglar, "Peyu" (2012-2018); Joel Diaz (2019-present); Jordi Asturgo (2017-2019); Nerea Sanfe (2022-present); Arnau Garcia (2023-2024)
- Voices of: Lluís Jutglar, "Peyu"
- Theme music composer: Can Sons
- Country of origin: Spain
- Original language: Catalan
- No. of seasons: 23
- No. of episodes: 879

Production
- Executive producers: Antoni Bassas; Mireia Giró
- Producers: Carolina Tebé; Montse Feliu
- Editors: Matias Carmona; Charly Fernàndez; Montse Gómez
- Running time: approx. 30 minutes
- Production companies: Royal Box (2004-2010); Alguna Pregunta (2010-present); Televisió de Catalunya

Original release
- Network: TV3
- Release: July 14, 2004 – present

Alguna Pregunta Més? (Catalan for "Any more questions?") often referred to by its initials APM? is a Catalan comedy show aired on the autonomous community's main public TV station TV3 since 2004, being the longest-running humor show in the channel. APM? has also gained nationwide exposure and popularity thanks to YouTube.

The program consists of a humorous recall of the news in Catalonia and the rest of Spain mixing scenes from television shows, documentaries, adverts and films.

== History ==
=== APM? on the radio ===
Alguna Pregunta Més? was born out of a segment in Catalunya Ràdio's morning program El matí de Catalunya Ràdio. The segment was created by Antoni Bassas and Xavier Bosch in 1995, and consisted of reviewing the news comically using sound bites taken from other radio and television shows. In its early years Bassas was the host of this section, and until 2000 it featured the collaboration of current Antena 3 host Manel Fuentes, who did voice impersonations. He was later replaced by Carles Capdevila.

In 1997, the first incarnation of APM? won the Ondas Award for best local radio show. It was discontinued when Antoni Bassas left El matí de Catalunya Ràdio in July 2008 due to discrepancies in the process of his contract renewal.

In 2012, Catalunya Ràdio brought back the radio version of Alguna Pregunta Més? under the name APM? Exprés as a segment in the program La Tribu that was hosted by Sergi Vives.

=== The jump to television ===
In 2004, to commemorate the tenth anniversary of the APM? radio show, Televisió de Catalunya ordered a special television installment that aired on July 14 on TV3. It was initially planned as a one-off deal, but the success of the special led to TV3 making Alguna Pregunta Més? a weekly 20-minute show from that same year. Much of the team that worked on APM? in Catalunya Ràdio was retained for the TV edition, with Guillem Sans becoming the director of the program in 2007. In 2010 Andalusian regional channel Canal Sur acquired the rights to the format and launched a Spanish-language version named Vamos que nos vamos.

== Segments ==
Aside from the television gaffe videos that are the centerpiece of the show, Alguna Pregunta Més? features several recurring segments:

- Pressing APM: A television star is invited to comment his/her own on-screen mistakes.
- La televisió és cultura ("Television is culture"): Television stars comment videos from different shows.
- Homo APM: Hidden camera pranks in which a character known as the "Homo APM" (played by one of the show's writers, Manel Piñeiro) tries to engage in conversations with anonymous or famous people using lines from footage shown on APM?.
- El defensor del espectador ("The defender of the viewer"): Funny moments or mistakes from presenters and game show contestants.
- Ole tu ("Olé for you"): Actor Lluís Jutglar, "Peyu", visits different places of Catalonia poking fun at their worst buildings.
- Què m'has dit? ("What did you say?"): This segment compiles diction mishaps on TV.
- Cinquè mil·leni ("Fifth millennium"): Humorous parody of Cuatro mystery research show Cuarto milenio.
- Per un Tub ("Through the Tube"): Fragments of films are re-dubbed with sound bites from notorious moments shown at APM?. The screen takes a YouTube-style appearance.
- APM? Trailer: An ongoing news issue is inserted comically into the teaser trailer of an upcoming or recently released film or video game.
- Clàssics APM? ("APM? Classics"): Similar to "APM? Trailer", using images of classic films.
- Sputnik: Musical segment that parodies the show of the same name aired on TV3's sister channel El 33. Usually consists of a music video with the audio of a different song.
- Xooof: This segment shows contradictory statements that a famous person made on different television programs, followed by footage of someone falling into a pool.
- La parabòlica ("The satellite dish"): This segment shows videos in foreign languages with comical subtitles related to current news.
- Fot Lee: Footage of different people on the receiving end of harsh criticism. The name of this segment is a pun of the renowned martial arts films actor Bruce Lee and "fot-li", Catalan for "screw him/her".

== Awards ==
- 1997: Ondas Award for best local radio show.
- 2009: Award for best communicator presented by the Blanquerna Department of Communication of Ramon Llull University.
- 2014: Ondas Award for best television show on a Spanish regional channel.
