= Lluís-Anton Baulenas =

Catalan writer, translator and literary critic (born 1958)

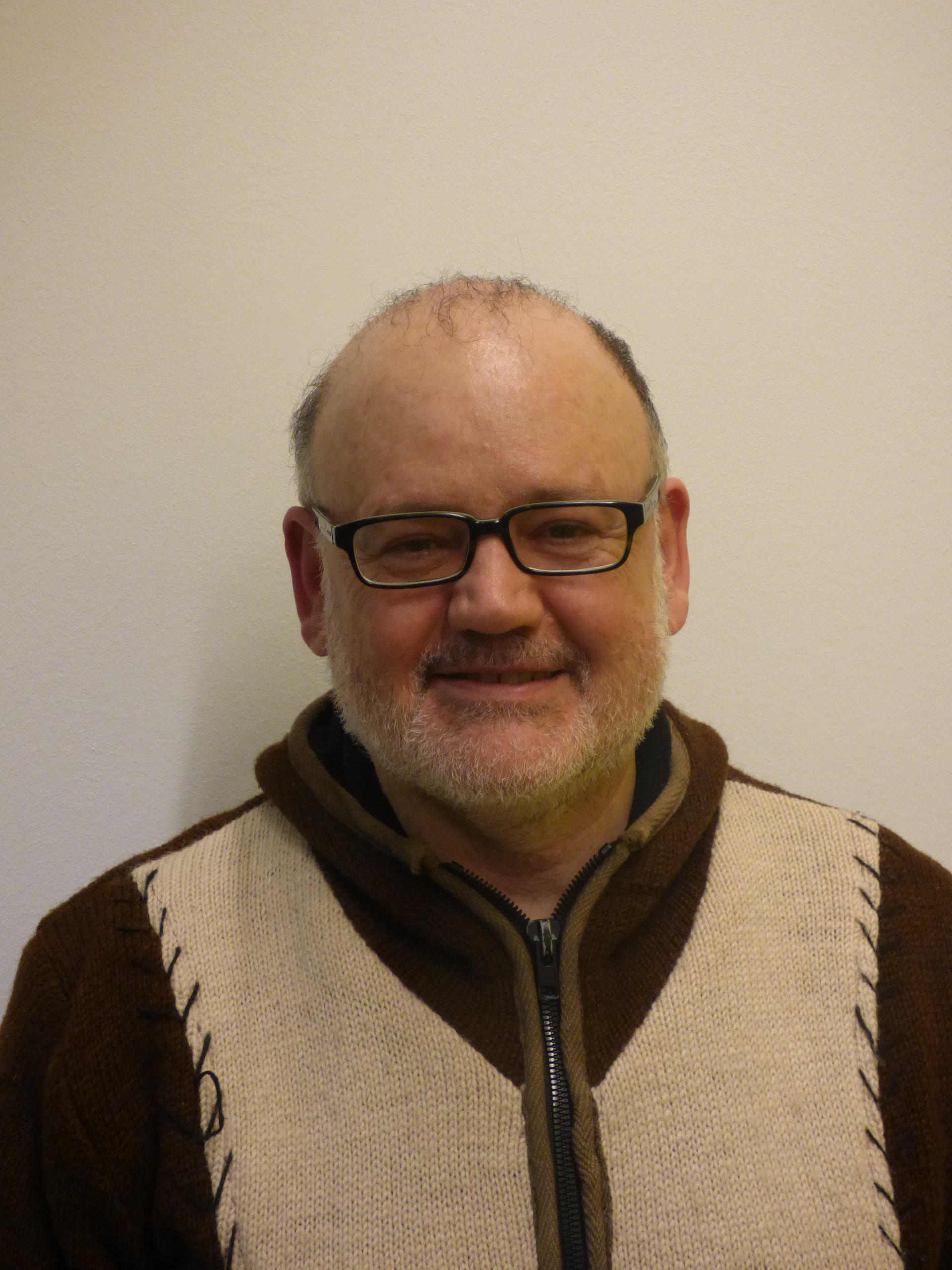
- Born: September 21, 1958 (age 67); Barcelona, Catalonia
- Occupations: Novelist, playwright, translator, literary critic
- Writing career
- Language: Catalan

Lluís-Anton Baulenas (Catalan pronunciation: [ʎuˈiz ənˈtɔm bəwˈlɛnəs]; born 21 September 1958 in Barcelona) is a Catalan novelist, translator and playwright.

== Career ==
Among his works are the novels Rampoines 451 (1990, English: Good-for-Nothing 451), Noms à la sorra (1995, English: Names in the Sand), which was a finalist for the Sant Jordi Prize, Alfons XIV (1997), El fil de plata (1998, English: The Silver Thread), which was awarded the Serra d'Or Critics' Prize and Carlemany Novel Award, La felicitat (2001, English: Happiness), which received the Prudenci Bertrana Prize. His novels Amor d'idiota (2003), Àrea de servei (2007) and La vostra Anita (2015) have been adapted for the screen by the film-maker Ventura Pons.

His work has been translated into a dozen languages. He has translated, from French and English to Catalan, classics by authors like Truman Capote or George Orwell, among others. He writes cultural articles and literary criticism for newspapers like El País, Ara, El Periódico de Catalunya, La Vanguardia and El Punt Avui.

== Works ==
=== Novels ===
- Qui al cel escup (EUMO, 1987)
- Neguit (Pòrtic, 1988)
- Sus Scrofa (porcs) (EUMO, 1988)
- Càlida nit (Edicions 62, 1989)
- Rampoines-451 (Columna Edicions, 1990)
- Noms a la sorra (Columna Edicions, 1994)
- Alfons XIV, un crim d'estat (Columna Edicions, 1997)
- Els caníbals (És la mateixa novel·la que Sus Scrofa (porcs))
- El fil de plata (Columna Edicions, 1998)
- La felicitat (Edicions 62, 2001)
- Amor d'idiota (Edicions 62, 2003)
- Per un sac d'ossos (Planeta, 2005)
- Àrea de servei (Destino, 2007)
- El nas de Mussolini (Proa, 2008)
- Quan arribi el pirata i se m'emporti (La Magrana, 2013)
- La vostra Anita (Bromera, 2015)
- Amics per sempre (Bromera, 2017)
- Els camins de la Rut (Proa, 2019)
- Seré el teu mirall (Comanegra / Àfora, 2023)

=== Plays ===
- La ben calçada (with Damià Barbany)
- No hi ha illes meravelloses
- Melosa fel
- El pont de Brooklyn
- Trist, com quan la lluna no hi és
- Cabaret d'hule i sofregit
- Un arabesc a la pell
- Històries negres

=== Non-fiction ===
- Manual de llengua catalana per a ús i bon aprofitament dels estudiants de COU
- El català no morirà
- L'últim neandertal (La Magrana/RBA, 2014)

== Awards ==
- 1988 La Piga Award for Neguit
- 1989 Documenta Award for Càlida nit
- 1995 Ciutat d'Alcoi Theatre Award for El pont de Brooklyn
- 1998 Carlemany Novel Award for El fil de plata
- 1999 Crítica Serra d'Or Novel Award for El fil de plata
- 2000 Prudenci Bertrana Prize Award for La felicitat
- 2005 Ramon Llull Novel Award for Per un sac d'ossos
- 2008 Sant Jordi Novel Award for El nas de Mussolini
- 2016 Ciutat d'Alzira Award for Amics per sempre
- 2023 Santa Eulàlia Award for Seré el teu mirall
