= Prudenci Bertrana Prize =

Literary prize

The Prudenci Bertrana Prize (Catalan: Premi Prudenci Bertrana, IPA: [ˈpɾɛmi pɾuˈðɛnsi βəɾˈtɾanə]) is a literary award for novels written in Catalan. It has been awarded annually since 1968 in honour of the Catalan author Prudenci Bertrana (1867–1941). The winner receives €42,000, and the prize is considered one of the most prestigious awards in Catalan literature.

The Fundació Prudenci Bertrana makes the award in September of each year at a ceremony in Girona. At the same time it makes awards for the best Catalan language poetry, essay, children's literature and website.

== Winners ==
Year	Novel	Author
2023	L'any que vaig estimar Ava Gardner	Jordi Solé i Comas
2022	El fabricant de records	Martí Gironell
2021	Amor a l’art	Tània Juste
2020	nima de tramuntana	Núria Esponellà
2019	La memòria de l'aigua	Montse Barderi
2018	El far	Maria Carme Roca
2017	Melissa i Nicole	David Nel·lo
2016	I ens vam menjar el món	Xevi Sala Puig
2015	La bíblia andorrana	Albert Villaró
2014	El dia que vaig fer vuit anys	Antoni Pladevall
2013	Faré tot el que tu vulguis	Iolanda Batallé
2012	La néta d'Adam	Patrícia Gabancho
2011	El món gira	David Cirici
2010	El secret del meu turbant	Agnès Rotger and Nàdia Ghulam
2009	L'home dels pijames de seda	Màrius Carol
2008	Petons de diumenge	Sílvia Soler
2006	Inquisitio	Alfred Bosch
2005	País Intim	Maria Barbal
2003	L'home que va estimar Natàlia Vidal	Julià de Jòdar
2002	Matèria fràgil	Jordi Arbonès
2001	La ciutat del fum	Vicenç Villatoro
2000	La felicitat	Lluís-Anton Baulenas
1999	El secret de Goethe	Martí Domínguez
1998	Com unes vacances	Imma Monsó
1997	Ulises a alta mar	Baltasar Porcel
1996	El camí de Vincennes	Antoni Marí
1995	La passió segons Renée Vivien	Maria Mercè Marçal
1994	Les hores detingudes	Ramon Solsona
1993	L'instint	Sergi Pàmies
1992	Senyoria	Jaume Cabré
1991	Joana E.	Maria Antònia Oliver Cabrer
1990	Ofidi	Josep Lozano
1989	La dona sense atributs	Jaume Melendres and Joan Abellan
1986	Hotel África	Ferran Cremades
1984	Cambra de bany	Joaquim Soler
1983	Fra Junoy o l'agonia dels sons	Jaume Cabré
1982	Biografía de J. L.	Josep Lluís Seguí
1981	Cercamon	Lluís Racionero
1980	Una primavera per a Domenico Guarini	Carme Riera
1978	L'anarquista nu	Lluís Fernández
1977	Dies d'ira a l'illa	Antoni-Lluc Ferrer
1976	L'udol del griso al caire de les clavagueres	Quim Monzó
1975	Cavalls cap a la fosca	Baltasar Porcel
1973	L’adolescent de sal	Biel Mesquida
1972	Oferiu flors als rebels que fracassaren	Oriol Pi de Cabanyes
1971	Siro o la increada consciència de la raça	Terenci Moix
1970	Amb permís de l'enterramorts	Vicenç Riera Llorca
1969	Prohibida l'evasió	Avel·lí Artís-Gener
1968	Estat d'excepció	Manuel de Pedrolo
