= Joan Barril =

Spanish writer and journalist

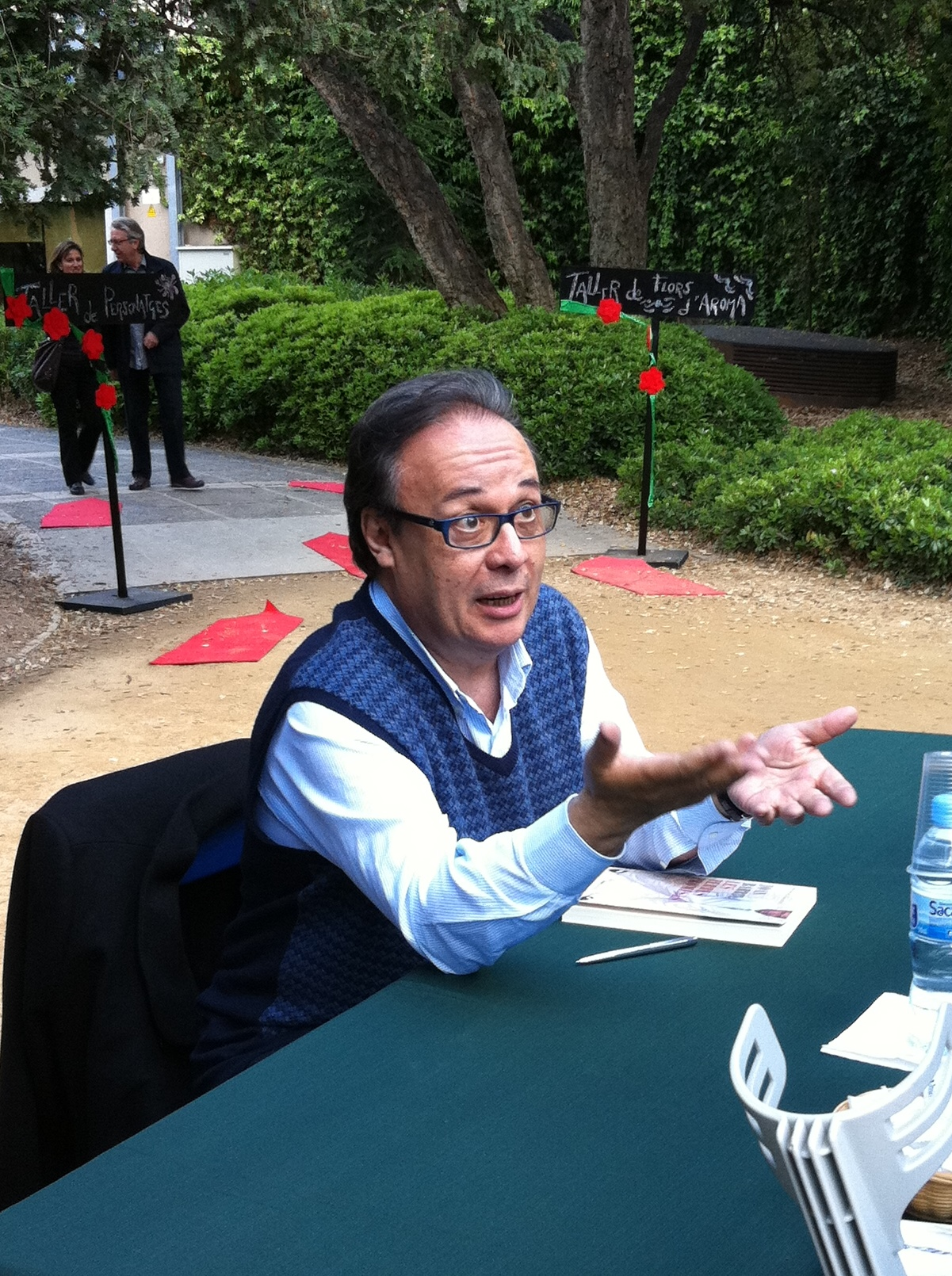
Barril in 2011

Joan Barril i Cuixart (20 January 1952 – 13 December 2014) was a Catalan journalist and writer. He was born in Barcelona, Spain. He was known for his writing columns in El País, La Vanguardia, and in El Periódico de Catalunya.

In 1998, he won the Ramon Llull Novel Award for Parada obligatòria.

Barril died in Barcelona from pneumonia, aged 62.
