= Isabel-Clara Simó =

Catalan writer (1943–2020)

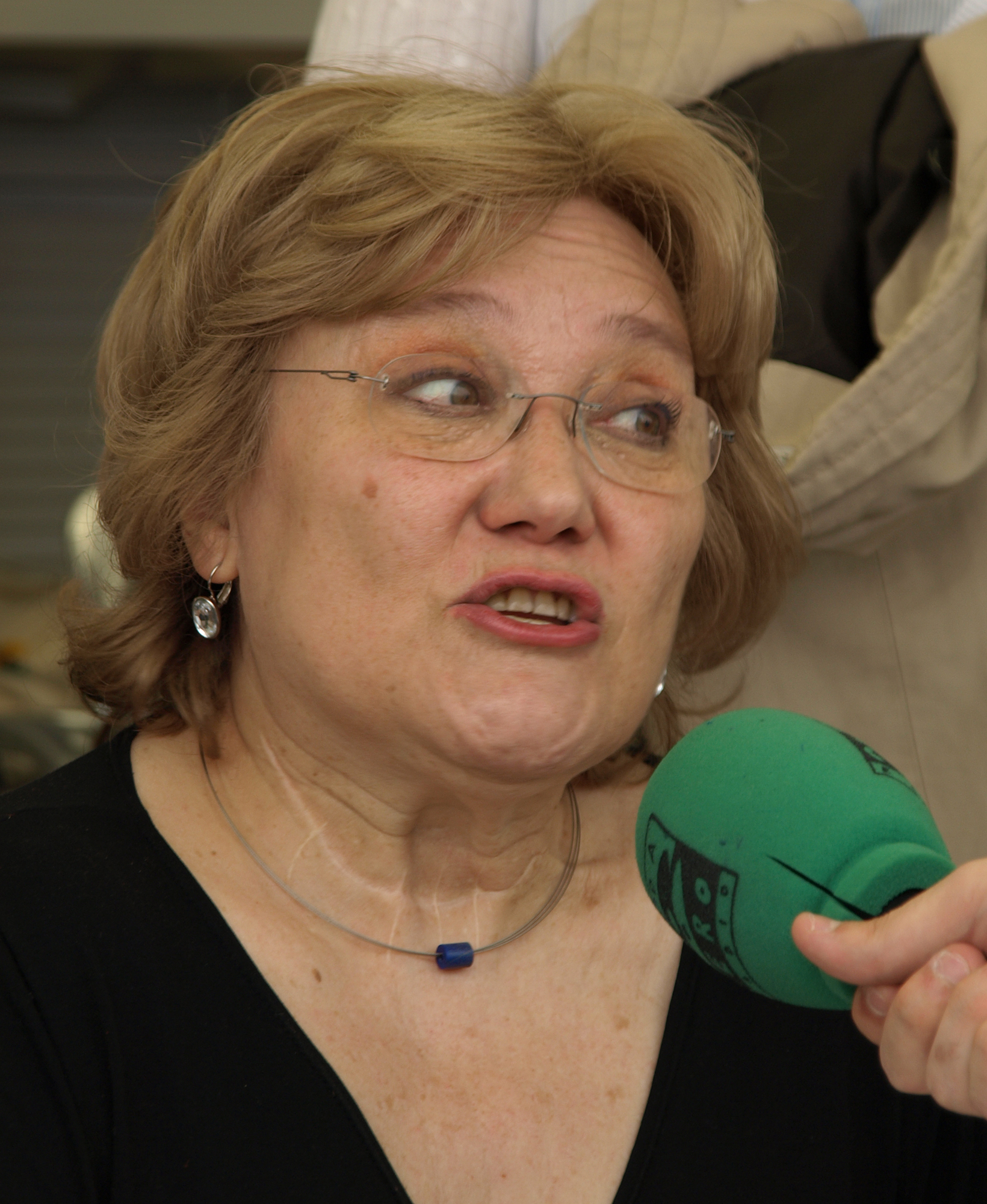
- Isabel-Clara Simó in 2008
- Born: April 4, 1943; Alcoi, Alicante, Spain
- Died: January 13, 2020 (aged 76); Barcelona, Catalonia
- Occupations: Writer, journalist, politician
- Writing career
- Notable work: És quan miro que hi veig clar (1979)
- Notable awards: Premi Víctor Català 1978 És quan miro que hi veig clar; Premi Sant Jordi de novel·la 2003 La salvatge

Isabel-Clara Simó i Monllor (4 April 1943 – 13 January 2020) was a Spanish journalist and writer. She is considered one of the most important writers in the Catalan language.

Simó was awarded several prizes, including the Premi Sant Jordi in 1993. As a journalist, she was the director of Canigó magazine and had a daily column in the newspaper Avui. She was a delegate of the Culture Department of the Generalitat de Catalunya.

== Biography ==
Isabel-Clara Simó was BSc+MSc on Philosophy for the Universitat de València and Journalism, and PhD on Romance Philology. She taught at Bunyol and afterwards at the IES Ramon Muntaner of Figueres, a town where her kids were born, and at the IES Sant Josep de Calasanç of Barcelona. She turned to journalism in 1972 as a director of the weekly Canigó and collaborated on a regular basis in several media. She created in her tales and novels a number of complex characters who have conflictive relationships, such as La Nati (1991), Raquel (1992), those from Històries perverses (1992) or those from T'imagines la vida sense ell? (2000). Some works as Júlia (1983) or D'Alcoi a Nova York (1987) was set on Alcoi, her birthplace.

She was awarded the Sant Jordi prize in 1993, for La salvatge. She was deputy of Books for the Departament de Cultura of the Generalitat de Catalunya. In 1999 she received the Creu de Sant Jordi, for her career. The collection Dones (1997) was adapted to the cinema in 2000. She also published L'home que volava en el trapezi (2002) and her collection of articles at the journal Avui, titled En legítima defensa. She also had a great success, both from critics and audience, for her theatre piece Còmplices, taken to the scenarios by Pep Cortès.

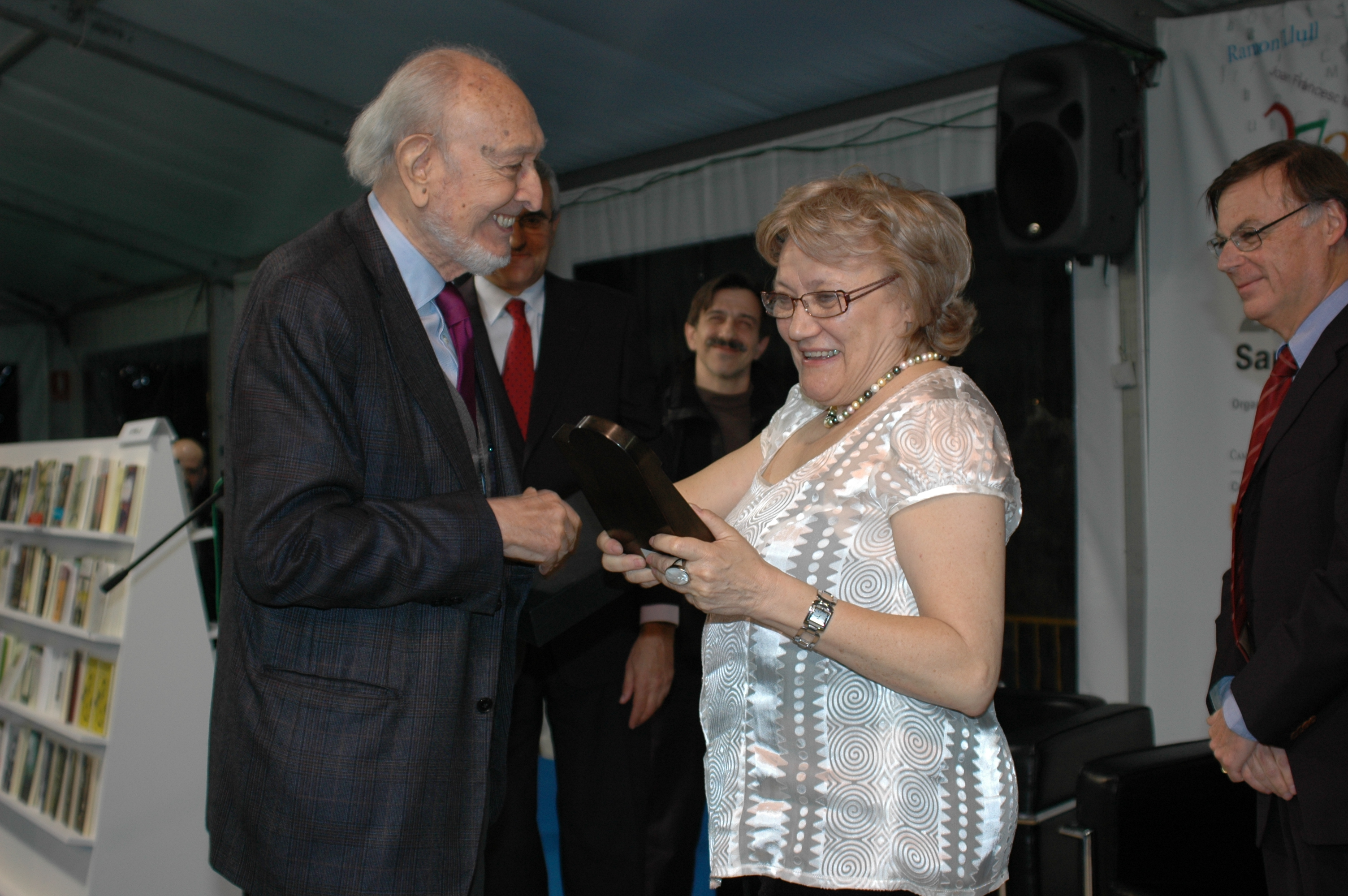
Isabel-Clara Simó receives the Trajectòria prize from Josep Maria Castellet. Right, Carles Solà. Background, Jordi Boixaderas and Albert Pèlach

In 1993 she won the Premi Crítica Serra d'Or de narració for Històries perverses. In 2001 she received the Andròmina prize for her work Hum... Rita!: L'home que ensumava dones, and in 2004 the Crítica dels Escriptors Valencians prize for her essay En legítima defensa. In 2007, she won the Premi de Novel·la Ciutat d'Alzira with El meu germà Pol.

As a journalist, she was director of the weekly Canigó, she wrote a number of articles for the journal Avui and nowadays for El Punt Avui.

In 2009 she was awarded the Trajectòria prize at the Setmana del Llibre en Català. According to the organization, this award recognizes the huge work of the writer and her effort in protecting the Catalan language. In 2013, she received the Golden Medal of the City council of Alcoi, as well as its Key to the City.

In 2017 she won the Premi d'Honor de les Lletres Catalanes.

== Selected works ==
- Júlia (1983)
- D'Alcoi a Nova York (1988)
- La veïna (1990)
- La Nati (1991)
- Raquel (1992)
- Històries perverses (1992)
- La Salvatge (1994)
- Dones (1997)
- El gust amarg de la cervesa (1999)
- T'imagines la vida sense ell? (2000)
- Carta al meu nét. Sobre el nacionalisme (2000)
- La Nati (2001)
- Estimats homes (una caricatura) (2001)
- L'home que volava en el trapezi (2002)
- En legítima defensa (2003)
- Angelets (2004)
- Adeu-Suau (2006)
- El caníbal (2007)
- Un Tros de Cel (2012)
