= Premi Sant Jordi de novel·la =

The Premi Sant Jordi de novel·la (Catalan pronunciation: [ˈpɾɛmi ˈsaɲ ˈʒɔɾði ðə nuˈβɛlːə]; "Saint George's novel prize") is an award for Catalan language literature, given by Òmnium Cultural and Enciclopèdia Catalana.

== History ==
=== Francoism ===
This award was created in 1947 by the Catalan publisher Aymà. First named Premi Joanot Martorell in 1947, changed the name to Premi Sant Jordi de novel·la in 1960.

=== Democracy ===
The award is given yearly during the Nit literària de Santa Llúcia in December and has an endowment of 60,000 euros.

== List of winners ==
=== Premi Joanot Martorell ===
	Year	Work	Author
1st	1947	Primera part	Cèlia Suñol i Pla
2nd	1948	El cel no és transparent	Maria Aurèlia Capmany
-	1949	No award	-
-	1950	No award	-
3rd	1951	El carrer estret	Josep Pla
4th	1952	La família Rouquier	Xavier Benguerel i Llobet
5th	1953	Com ganivets o flames	Josep Maria Espinàs
6th	1954	Estrictament personal	Manuel de Pedrolo
7th	1955	Incerta glòria	Joan Sales
8th	1956	La maroma	Ramon Folch i Camarasa
9th	1957	El mar	Blai Bonet
10th	1958	Un camí de Damasc	Miquel Llor
11th	1959	Animals destructors de lleis	Ricard Salvat

=== Premi Sant Jordi ===
	Year	Work	Author
1st	1960	Viure no és fàcil	Enric Massó
2nd	1961	L'últim replà	Josep Maria Espinàs
3rd	1962	Balanç fins a la matinada	Manuel de Pedrolo
4th	1963	L'ombra de l'atzavara	Pere Calders
5th	1964	La visita	Ramon Folch i Camarasa
6th	1965	La derrota	Estanislau Torres
7th	1966	El carrer de les Camèlies	Mercè Rodoreda
8th	1967	39° a l'ombra	Antònia Vicens
9th	1968	Un lloc entre els morts	Maria Aurèlia Capmany
10th	1969	No winner	-
11th	1970	Nifades	Josep Maria Sonntag
12th	1971	Fes memòria, Bel	Vicenç Riera Llorca
13th	1972	L'enquesta del Canal Quatre	Avel·lí Artís-Gener
14th	1973	La casa encesa	Miquel Àngel Riera
15th	1974	Pinyol tot salivat	Josep Albanell
16th	1975	Un regne per a mi	Pau Faner
17th	1976	El temps de les cireres	Montserrat Roig
18th	1977	Coll de serps	Ferran Cremades
19th	1978	Un home qualsevol	Jordi Carbonell i Tries
20th	1979	La senyora	Antoni Mus
21st	1980	L'espectacle	Joan Mas i Bauzà
22nd	1981	Evangeli gris	Vicenç Villatoro
23rd	1982	Christian	Antoni Pasqual
24th	1983	La teranyina	Jaume Cabré
25th	1984	Al meu cap una llosa	Olga Xirinacs
26th	1985	Els colors de l'aigua	Isidre Grau
27th	1986	Les primaveres i les tardors	Baltasar Porcel
28th	1987	Posicions	Ricard Creus
29th	1988	Retrat de Carme en penombra	Agustí Alcoberro
30th	1989	Declarat desert pel jurat	-
31st	1990	Línia trencada	Ferran Cremades
32nd	1991	El sol de la tarda	Robert Saladrigas
33rd	1992	Cames de seda	Maria Mercè Roca
34th	1993	La salvatge	Isabel-Clara Simó
35th	1994	Gràcies per la propina	Ferran Torrent
36th	1995	Els fantasmes del Trianon	Nèstor Luján
37th	1996	El misteri de Berlín	Jordi Mata
38th	1997	L'atles furtiu	Alfred Bosch
39th	1998	El Quincorn. Una història romàntica	Miquel de Palol
40th	1999	El llibre de les mosques	Emili Teixidor
41st	2000	Sota la pols	Jordi Coca
42nd	2001	No miris enrere	David Castillo
43rd	2002	Purgatori	Joan Francesc Mira
44th	2003	La meitat de l'ànima	Carme Riera
45th	2004	La ciutat invisible	Emili Rosales
46th	2005	El metall impur	Julià de Jòdar
47th	2006	Sayonara Barcelona	Joaquim Pijoan

	Year	Work	Author	Runner up	Author
48th	2007	Les senyoretes de Lourdes	Pep Coll	El monestir de l'amor secret	Maria Dolors Farrés
49th	2008	El nas de Mussolini	Lluís-Anton Baulenas	El músic del bulevard Rossini	Vicent Usó
50th	2009	Se sabrà tot	Xavier Bosch i Sancho	La dona que fugia de la boira	Albert Llimós
51st	2010	L'home de la maleta	Ramon Solsona	Després de Laura	Jordi Cabré
52nd	2011	Crim de sang	Sebastià Alzamora	Kabul i Berlín a l'últim segon	Joan Mas i Vives

	Year	Work	Author
53rd	2012	Plans de futur	Màrius Serra
54th	2013	Dies de frontera	Vicenç Pagès
55th	2014	L'àguila negra	Joan Carreras
56th	2015	La vida sense la Sara Amat	Pep Puig
57th	2016	El setè àngel	David Cirici
58th	2017	Jo sóc aquell que va matar Franco	Joan-Lluís Lluís
59th	2018	Digues un desig	Jordi Cabré i Trias
60th	2019	Les amistats traïdes	David Nel·lo
61st	2020	L'aigua que vols	Víctor García Tur
62nd	2021	Morir-ne disset	Sergi Belbel
63rd	2022	Les nostres mares	Gemma Ruiz i Palà
64th	2023	Confeti	Jordi Puntí
