= Olga Xirinacs Díaz =

Spanish writer and piano teacher (born 1936)

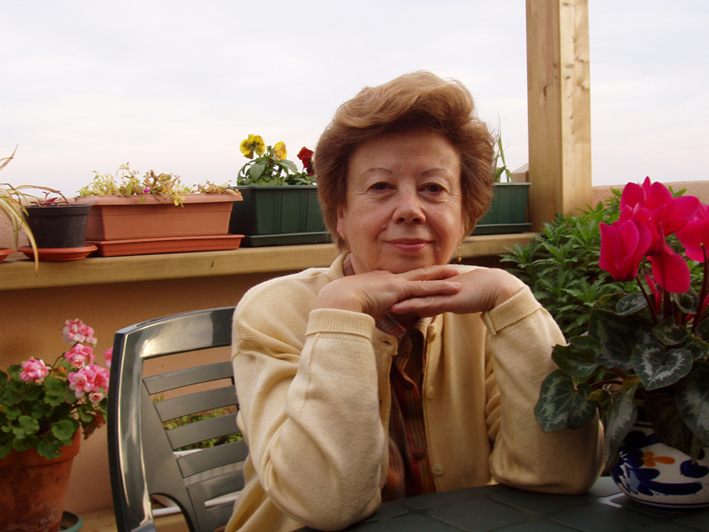
Olga Xirinacs Díaz

Olga Xirinacs Díaz (born 1936) is a Spanish writer and piano teacher. During her literary career, she has written poetry, drama, tales and essays. She was born in Tarragona (Catalonia, Spain), where she still lives and works.

Xirinacs often writes in the daily press: her articles have been published in La Vanguardia, Avui, and Foc Nou, amongst others. She has given narrative courses in the Aula de Lletres and in Barcelona's Pompeu Fabra University.

Some of her books have won prestigious Catalan literature awards, including the Sant Jordi, Sant Joan, Josep Pla, Ramon Llull and the Carles Riba prizes.

She has published more than three hundred tales, 250 for adults and around 50 for children. She is the only female "Mestra en Gai Saber" (Master in the Art of Poetry) of the Jocs Florals (Literary Contest) after Mercè Rodoreda Gurgui. In 1990, the Generalitat de Catalunya awarded her the Creu de Sant Jordi. She is a member of Association of Catalan-Language Writers.

== Prose works ==
- Música de cambra (Chamber music) Barcelona 1982.
- Interior amb difunts (Inside Corpses), Josep Pla Prize, 1982. Barcelona 1983.
- La mostela africana i altres contes (The African weasel and other tales) Barcelona 1985.
- Al meu cap una llosa (On my Head, a Tombstone) Sant Jordi Prize, 1984 and Serra d'Or Critics Prize for the Novel. Barcelona 1985.
- Zona marítima (Maritime Area), Ramon Llull Novel Award, 1986. Barcelona 1986.
- Relats de mort i altres matèries (Stories of death and other stuff) Barcelona 1988.
- Mar de fons (Deep sea). Barcelona 1988.
- Tempesta d'hivern (Winter storm). Barcelona 1990.
- Enterraments lleugers (Shallow Interments), Sant Joan Prize, 1990. Barcelona 1991.
- Cerimònia privada (Private ceremony). Barcelona 1993.
- Josep Sala. Tarragona 1993.
- Sense malícia (Without wickedness), City of Palma Novel Prize, 1993. Barcelona 1993
- Sucant el melindro. (Dipping the sponge biscuit). Barcelona 1996.
- La Via Augusta. Vint pobles fan el Tarragonès. De Llevant a Ponent. (August Way . Twenty villages that make Tarragones. From West to East)Barcelona 1997.
- Viatge d’aigua. Un passeig per la Costa Daurada (Water travel. A walk through Costa Daurada). Barcelona 1999.
- La tarda a Venècia (An afternoon in Venice). Barcelona 1999.
- L’home que mossegava les dones (The man who bit women). Barcelona 2000.
- Pavana per un tauró (Mourning music for a Shark). Barcelona 2001.
- No jugueu al cementiri (Do not play in the cemetery). Thriller Prize 2001. Barcelona 2002.
- Els 7 pecats capitals. La peresa – eròtica- (The 7 capital sins. The erotic laziness). Barcelona 2002.
- Setmana de difunts (Dead week). Barcelona 2003
- El viatge. Dietari 1986-1990 (The voyage: Diary 1986-1990). Barcelona 2004.
- El hijo del tejedor (The weaver's son). Spanish language. Barcelona 2006.
- Trens (Trains). Barcelona 2006

== Poetic works ==
- Botons de tiges grises (Buttons from grey ítems). Barcelona 1977.
- Clau de blau (Tarraconis vrit amor) (The Blue Key). Tarragona 1978.
- Llençol de noces (Wedding bedsheet). Barcelona 1979.
- Tramada (Ploted) Collective with the group Espiadimonis. Tarragona 1980.
- Preparo el te sota palmeres roges( I prepare the tea under red palm trees). Caravel·la Prize, 1980. Barcelona 1981.
- Versifonies. Collective with the group Espiadimonis (Versymphonies).Tarragona 1987.
- Llavis que dansen (Lips that dance). Barcelona 1987.
- La pluja sobre els palaus ( The rain over the palaces). Barcelona 1990.
- La muralla. (The wall). Barcelona 1993.
- Mansardes. (Mansards) Collective with the group Espiadimonis. Tarragona 1997.
- Grills de mandarina. (Mandari orange segments). Lleida 2004.
- El sol a les vinyes. (The Sun in the vineyards. Il vangelo, Pasolini in memoriam). Bilingual edition. Barcelona 2005
- Eterna. (Eternal). Bilingual edition Catalan/Spanish. Barcelona 2006

== Works for children ==
- Marina. Illustrated by Asun Balzola. Barcelona 1986.
- Patates fregides. (Fried potatoes). Illustrated byCarme Solé. Barcelona 1994.
- Sóc un arbre. (I’m a tree). Illustrated by Asun Balzola. Barcelona 1994.
- El far del capità. (The captain’s lighthouse). Illustrated by Carme Solé. Barcelona 1994.
- Xocolata. (Chocolate) Barcelona 1994.
- El meu pare és capità (My father is a captain). Illustrated by Gemma Sales. Barcelona 1995.
- Final d’estiu. (Summer’s end) Barcelona 1996.
- Wendy torna a volar. (Wendy flies again)Barcelona 1996.
- El vol de Dràcula. (Dracula’s fly)Illustrated by Francesc Infante. Barcelona 1996.
- Mòmies. (Mummies) Barcelona 1996.
- Triangles mortals o la sala dels difunts (Mortal triangles or the corpses' room). Illustrated by Mercè Canals. Barcelona 1998.
- Marina / Cavall de mar. (Marina/Seahorse). Illustrated by Asun Balzola. Barcelona 1998.
- La núvia adormida. (The sleeping bride) Barcelona 1998.
- La Vaca Xoriça. (Xoriça caw). Illustrated by Laia Soler. Barcelona 1998.
- Un cadàver per sopar. (A corpse for dinner) City of Badalona Prize for Young People's Narrative, 2000. Barcelona 2000.
- L’escrivent de làpides. (The tombstone court clerk) Barcelona 2002.

== Translated works ==
=== Spanish ===
- Zona marítima. (Maritime zone). Translated by Sara Pujol. Barcelona 1987.
- El faro del capitán. (The captain’s lighthouse). Author’s translation. Madrid 1994.
- Fin de verano. (Summer’s end). Author’s translation. Madrid 1996.
- El vuelo de drácula. (Dracula’s fly). Author’s translation. Madrid, 1996.
- El árbol de mi patio.(The tree from my courtyard). Asun Balzola's drawings. Author’s translation. Barcelona, 1996.
- Marina y Caballito de mar. (Marina and Sea horse). Author’s translation. Madrid, 1998.
- La novia dormida.(the Asleep bride) Author’s translation. Barcelona, 1998.
- El escribiente de lápidas. (The tombstone court clerk) Translated by Pau Joan Hernàndez. Barcelona, 2002.

=== Other languages ===
- Many tales have been translated into German, Basque, Spanish and Russian
- Lips that dance (poetry) translated to English by Hillary J Gardner. Washington University.
- Poetry translated to French published in some French and Canadian magazines.
- Jardines sobre el mar (Gardens over the sea) Bilingual anthology of poetry. Translated to Russian by Elena Zernova. Sant Petersburg University. 2003
