= Pilar Aymerich i Puig =

Spanish photographer and photojournalist

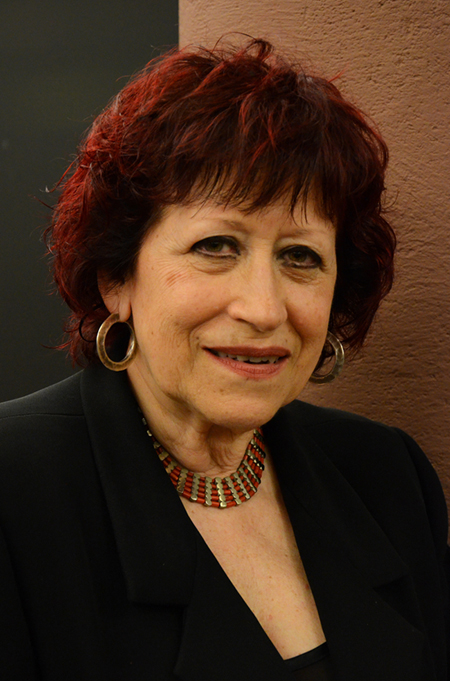

Pilar Aymerich i Puig (commonly, Pilar Aymerich; born 1943 in Barcelona) is a Catalan photographer and photojournalist. In 2005, she received the Creu de Sant Jordi Award.

== Early years ==
She studied at the Escuela de Arte Dramático Adrià Gual (EADAG) in Barcelona and then in London, where she was introduced to the field of photography. Under the guidance of EADAG's co-director, Maria Aurèlia Capmany, and others, Aymerich and childhood friend, Montserrat Roig, learned of the European Left, its literary tradition, and Catalan writers.

== Career ==
After expanding her expertise, Aymerich specialized in photojournalism and portraits. She began her career as a professional photographer in 1968 in Barcelona collaborating with the CIS agency at a time when there was still censorship. Her graphic work has appeared in various periodicals such as Triunfo, Destino, Cambio 16, El País, Fotogramas, and Qué Leer. She collaborated in several books including those dedicated to important Catalan women such as Montserrat Roig, Federica Montseny, Mercè Rodoreda, Caterina Albert, and Maria Aurèlia Capmany, which led to exhibitions dedicated to them. Since 1974, she has worked in audiovisual media with TVE participating in various programs. She has also done pedagogical work teaching photography to youth and at the Institute of Photographic Studies of Catalonia. In late 2004, she exhibited at the Museum of Catalan History entitled "Memory of a time".

== Awards ==
In 2005, she received the Creu de Sant Jordi Award.

In 2021 she obtained the National Photography Prize of Spain.

== Bibliography ==
- Barry-Waag, Kathleen Nelly (2005). The Early Novels of Montserrat Roig: Ramona Adéu, El Temps de Les Cireres, and L'hora Violeta; an Approach to Contemporary Catalonia and Catalan Women Writers. University of California, Berkeley.
