= Xavier Bosch i Sancho =

Catalan-Spanish writer and journalist

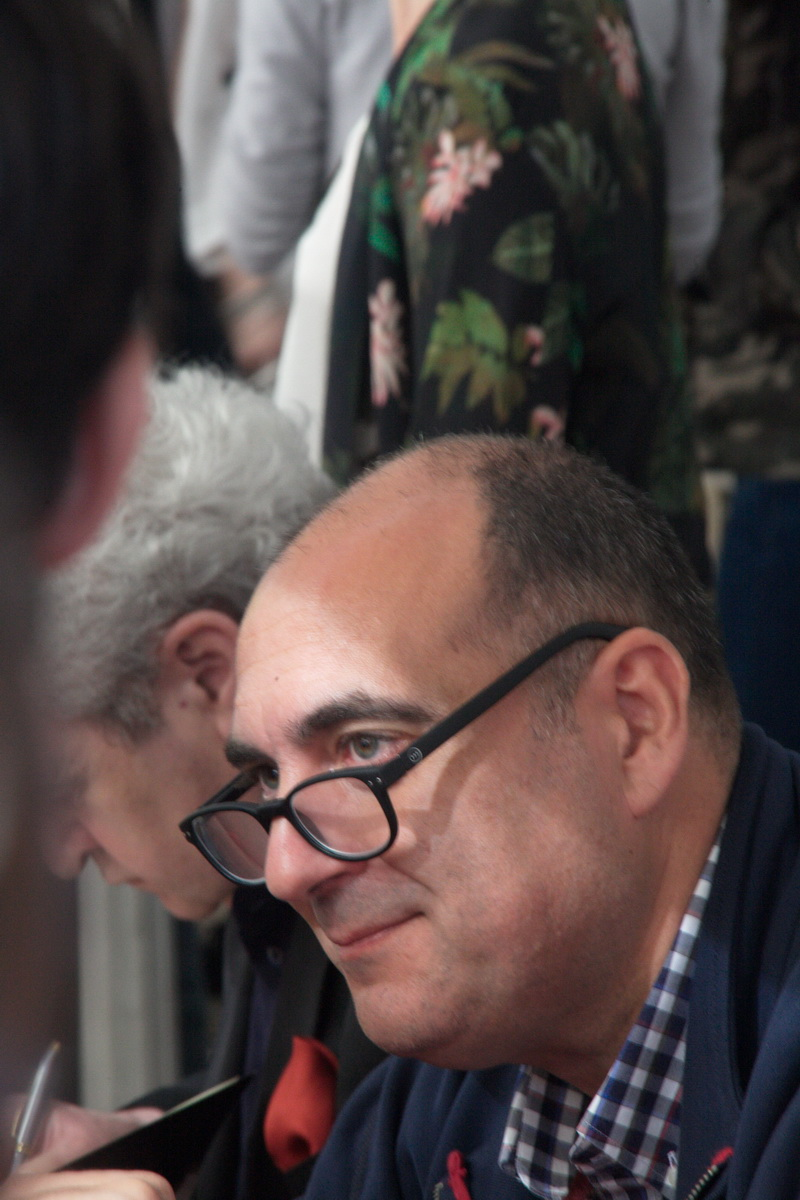
- Bosch in 2015
- Born: 21 July 1967 (age 58); Barcelona, Spain
- Occupation(s): writer and journalist

Xavier Bosch i Sancho (born 21 July 1967) is a Catalan-Spanish writer and journalist.

He was the creator, together with Antoni Bassas of the humorous program Alguna pregunta més? at Catalunya Ràdio, for which he received an Ondas award. Specializing in sports journalism, he worked at La Vanguardia, TV3, RAC 1 and was director of the newspaper Avui from 2007 to 2008. In 2010 he has been one of the initiator of a new daily newspaper in Catalan language, Diari Ara. Regarding his career as a novelist, he has written a trilogy starred by journalist Dani Santana, which first book Se sabrà tot received a Sant Jordi Award in 2009. Second and third novels were Homes d'honor (2012) and Eufòria. His novel Algú com tu (Someone like you) (2015), is winner of the 2015 Ramon Llull Award. On his last novel La dona de la seva vida he writes about child abduction.

== Works ==
=== Short stories ===
- Jo, el simolses, Barcelona: La Magrana, 1992.
- Estimat diari (with Lloll Bertran, Antoni Bassas), Barcelona: La Magrana, 1996.
- Vicis domèstics, Barcelona: La Magrana, 1998.

=== Novel ===
- La màgia dels reis, Barcelona: Columna - La Galera, 1994.
- Se sabrà tot, 2009.
- Homes d'honor, Barcelona: Proa, 2012.
- Eufòria, 2014.
- Algú com tu, 2014
- Nosaltres dos, 2017
- Paraules que tu entendràs, 2019
- La dona de la seva vida, 2021.

=== Teatre ===
- El culékulé, Barcelona: La Magrana, 1996

== Prizes ==
- Premi Ondas 1997 for the humour program Alguna pregunta més?
- Premi Mundo Deportivo de periodisme 1999, for the program Aquest any, cent!.
- Premio Premi APEI-Catalunya (in its sixth edition) for El món a RAC 1.
- Premi Ràdio Associació de Catalunya 2007 in the category of the Best Radio Program for El món a RAC 1.
- Premi Sant Jordi for the novel Se sabrà tot.
- Premi Ramon Llull 2015 for the novel Algú com tu.
