= Aymerich =

Aymerich is a surname of Catalan origin. Notable people with the surname include:

- Joseph Gaudérique Aymerich (1858–1937), French soldier
- Melchor Aymerich (1754–1836), Spanish general and colonial administrator
- Pilar Aymerich i Puig (born 1943), Spanish photographer and photojournalist
