= Ramon Solsona i Sancho =

Catalan writer and publicist

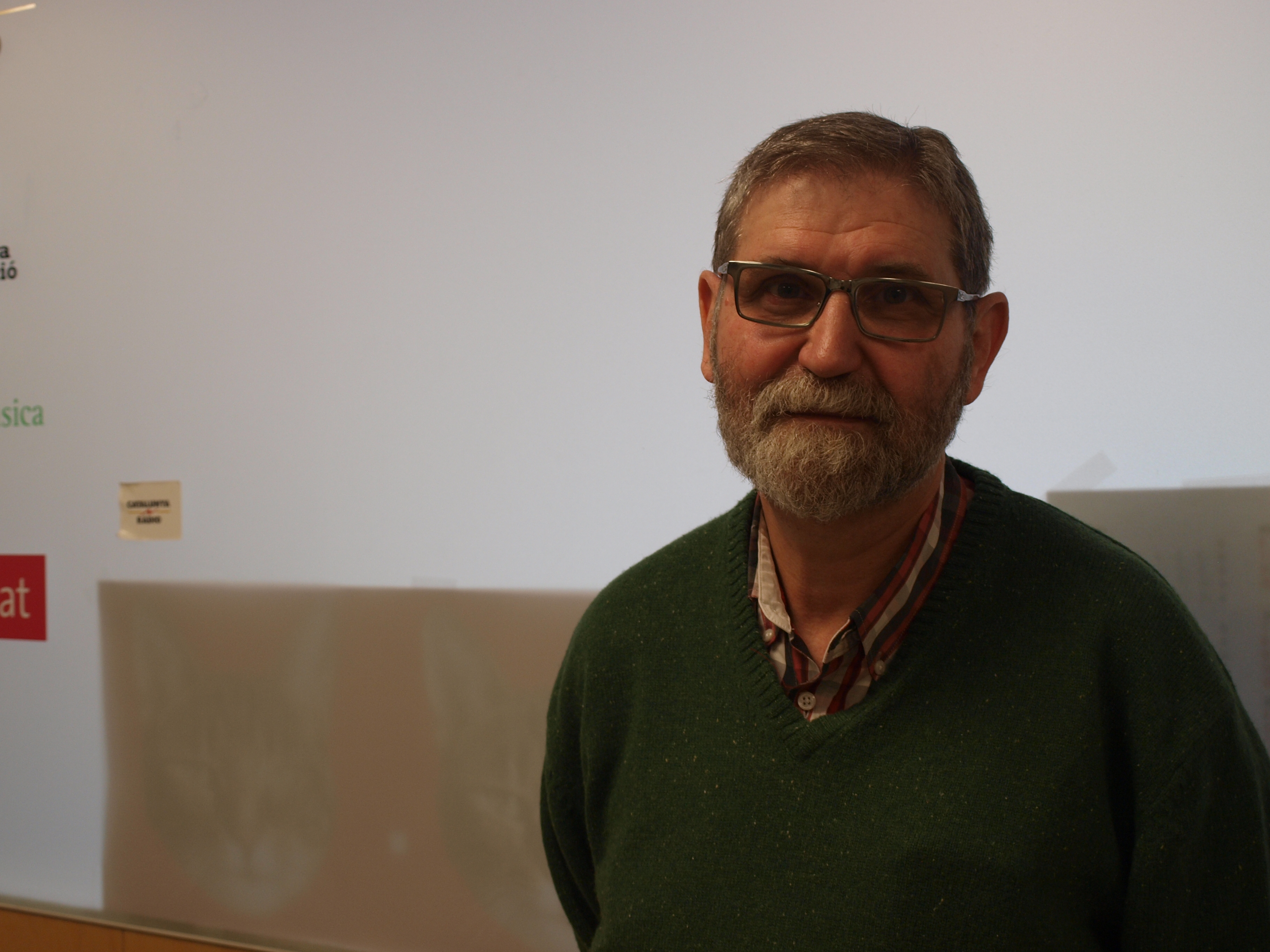
- Ramon Solsona in 2015
- Born: February 7, 1950 (age 76)
- Occupation: Writer
- Writing career
- Language: Catalan

Ramon Solsona i Sancho (Barcelona, February 7, 1950) is a Catalan writer and publicist. He has a degree in Romance Philology and he is also a high school teacher on leave. Notable for his ironic style and numerous collaborations with print media (Avui, Diari de Barcelona, La Vanguardia) and radio (Catalunya Ràdio, RAC 1), he is a currently collaborator of a radio program (El Matí de Catalunya Ràdio with Mònica Terribas, section "Entre paraules").

== Career ==
He has also been a poet (satirist) under the pseudonym Lo Gaiter del Besòs. His novel Les hores detingudes won three literary prizes in the same year and was translated into Spanish and French. For television, he has worked as a writer for the series Agència de viatges, Estació d'enllaç and El cor de la ciutat, which were broadcast by TV3. He was author of the lyrics of the hymn for the centenary of FC Barcelona (1998), set to music by Antoni Ros-Marbà. In 2010 he received the premi Sant Jordi de novel·la for his book L'home de la maleta.

== Works ==
Ramon Solsona talking about Tísner

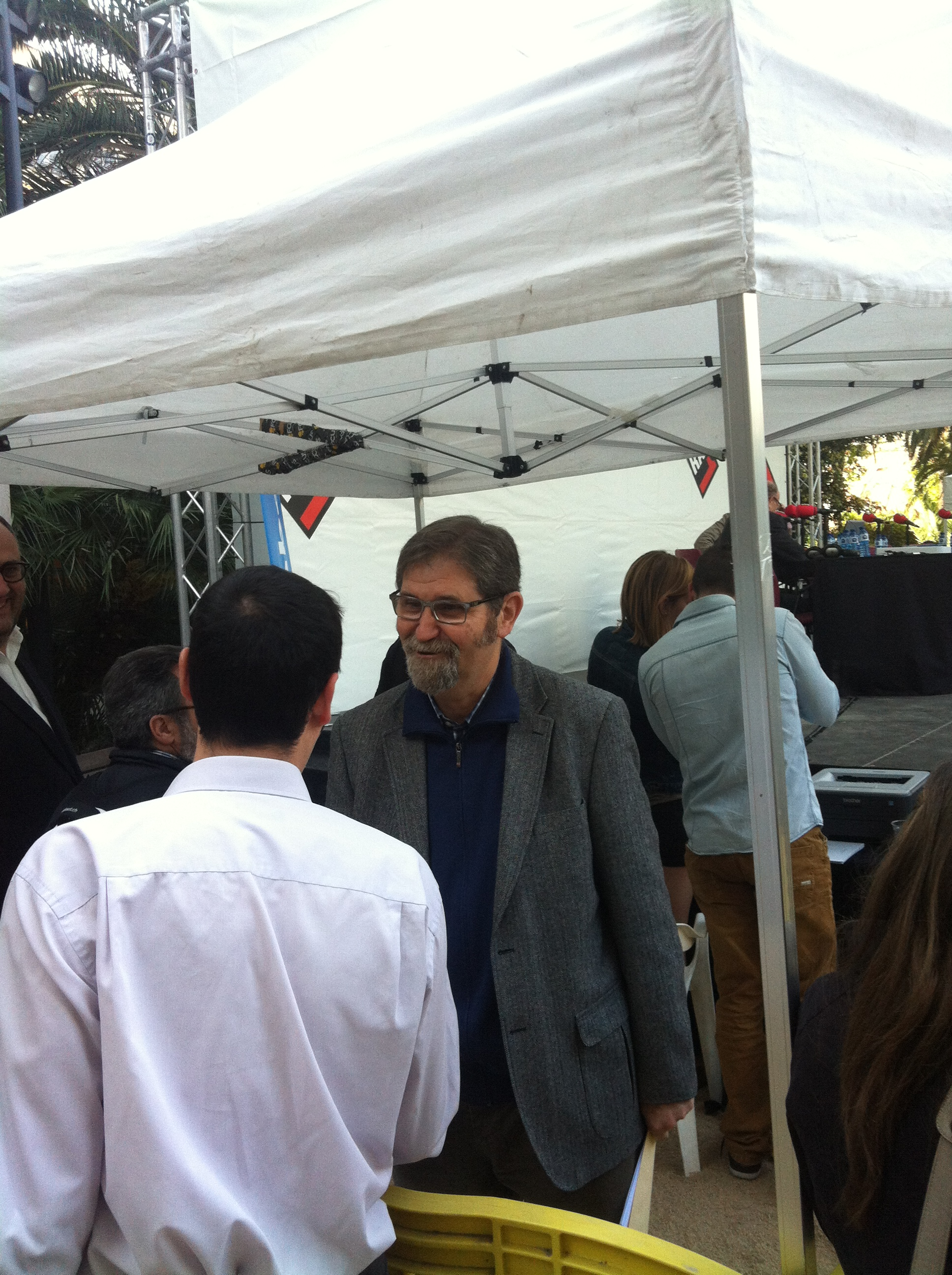
Solsona at St George's Day, 2013

=== Short stories ===
- 1991: Llibreta de vacances
- 2006: Cementiri de butxaca

=== Novels ===
- 1989: Figures de calidoscopi
- 1993: Les hores detingudes
- 1998: DG
- 1999: No tornarem mai més
- 2001: El cor de la ciutat
- 2004: Línia blava
- 2011: L'home de la maleta

=== Poetry ===
- 1989: Sac de gemecs

=== Nonfiction ===
- 1995: Ull de bou
- 1995 Ull de vaca
- 2005: A paraules em convides
