= Vicenç Pagès =

Catalan writer, professor, and literary critic (1963–2022)

Vicenç Pagès i Jordà
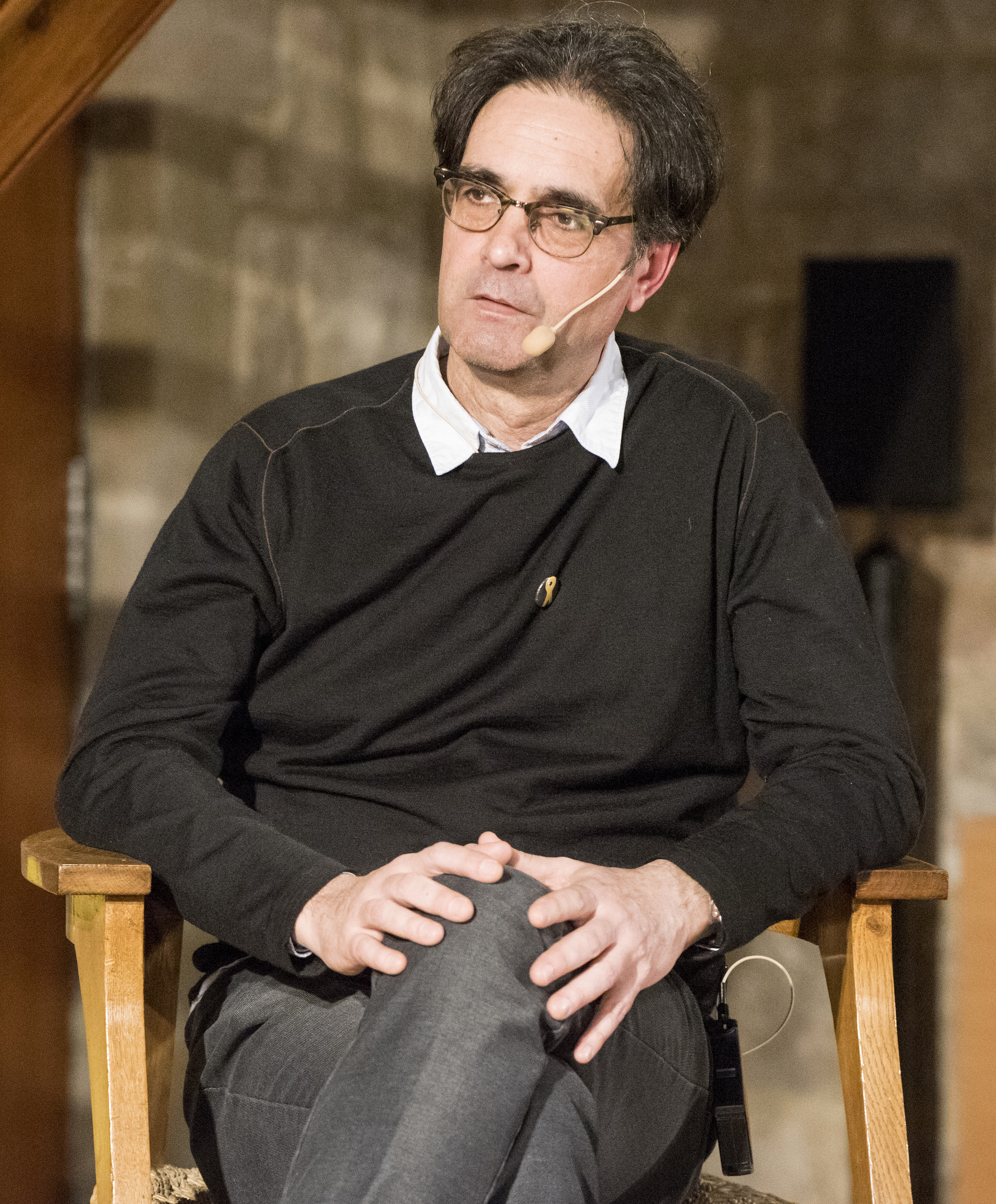
- Born: 14 December 1963; Figueres, Spain
- Died: 27 August 2022 (aged 58)
- Writing career
- Language: Catalan

Vicenç Pagès i Jordà (14 December 1963 – 27 August 2022) was a Catalan writer and literary critic. He was also a language and aesthetics professor at the Ramon Llull University. He published a dozen books, including novels, story collections, and essays. Among his many awards are the 1999 Documenta, the 2003 Sant Joan, the 2009 Crexells, the 2013 sant Jordi, and the 2014 Catalan National Cultural Prize.

== Works and recognition ==
In 1989 he won the Barcelona's Biennal in the literature section, and the following year published his first book, the collection of stories Cercles d'infinites combinacions (Circles of infinite combinations). In 1991 he published the work Grandeses i misèries dels premis literaris (Greatness and misery of literary awards), with a thousand citations.

In 1995 appeared his most ambitious work, El món d'Horaci (Horaci's world), a novel that is halfway between fiction and creative essay. In 1997 he published his best-seller book, Carta a la reina d'Anglaterra (Letter to the England's Queen), that tells in a hundred pages thousand years of life of its main character. This book is followed by Un tramvia anomenat text (A streetcar named text), an essay about writing the text as it considers an inseparable mixture of inspiration and craft, genius and power, magic and discipline.

En companyia de l'altre (in each other's company) (award Documenta 1998) marks the return to the story genre. In this occasion, the collection is unitary, since all the stories revolve around the issue of dual. It was followed by the novel La felicitat no és completa (The happiness is not complete), award Sant Joan of narrative 2003, the intermittent biography of a character without convictions. In 2004, the collection El poeta i altres contes obtained the award Premi Mercè Rodoreda, and was published the following year. In 2006 appeared De Robinson Crusoe a Peter Pan. Un cànon-de literatura juvenil. He won the award premi Creixells with the novel Els jugadors de Whist. From 2010 to 2011 he had a column in the newspaper Avui. In 2012 he published El llibre de l'any with the painter Joan Mateu Bagaria.

In 2013 he won premi Sant Jordi de novel·la for Dies de frontera, in 2014 he was awarded the National Literature Prize of the Generalitat of Catalonia and in 2015 he won the Maria Àngels Anglada Prize.

== Personal life and death ==
Pagès died on 27 August 2022, at the age of 58.
