= Joan Carreras i Goicoechea =

Catalan writer & journalist (born 1962)

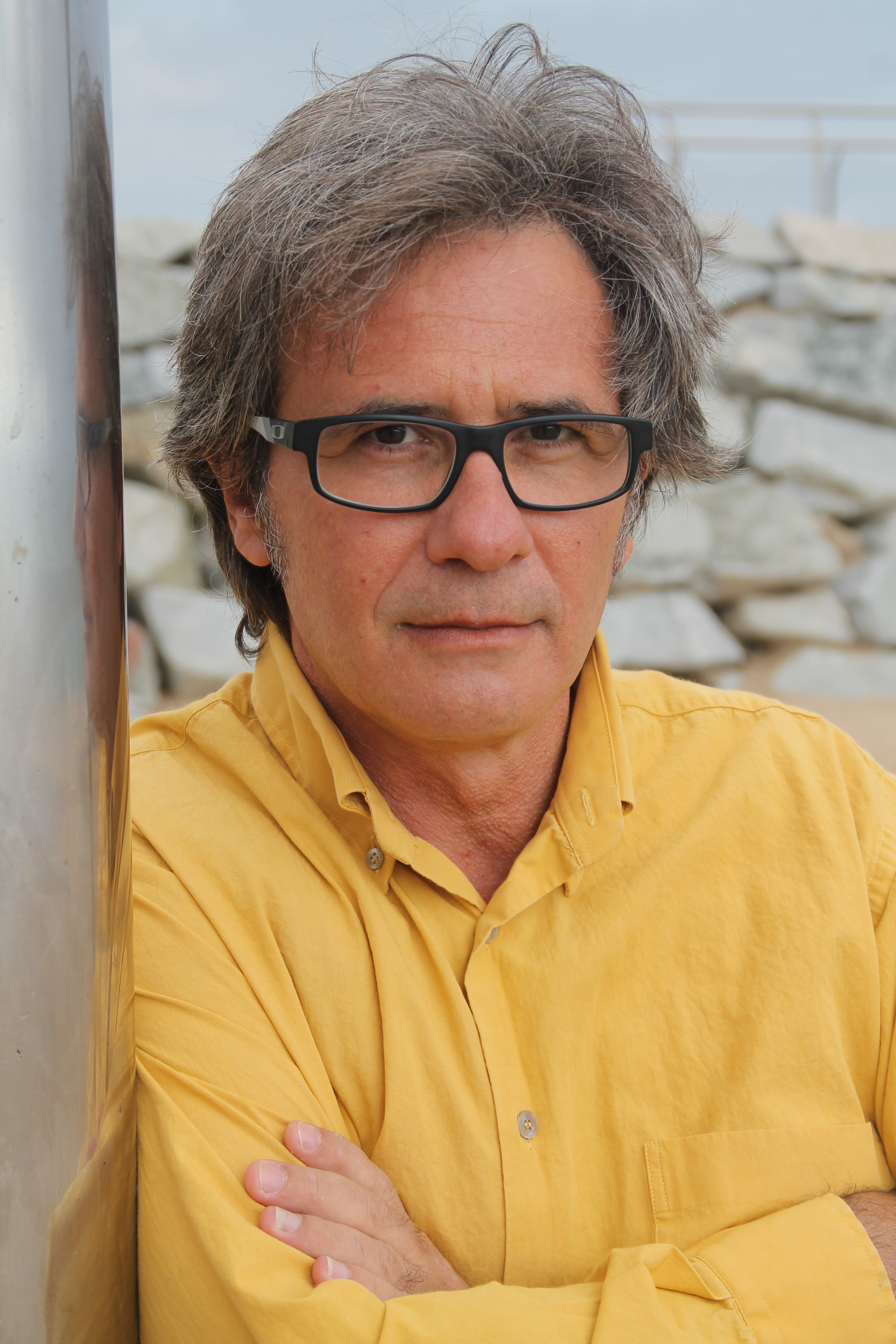
- Joan Carreras in 2013
- Born: 1962 (age 63–64); Barcelona
- Occupations: Writer and journalist
- Writing career
- Language: Catalan
- Notable work: Cafè Barcelona
- Website: janquim.cat

Joan Carreras i Goicoechea (born 1962) is a Spanish journalist, screenwriter and writer in the Catalan language.

== Biography ==
Son of Joan Carreras i Martí, he is associated lecturer in the Faculty of Communication at Blanquerna, where he teaches digital journalism. He worked for a decade at the broadcasting company Corporació Catalana de Mitjans Audiovisuals, where he was director of Canal 33 and in charge of the creation of the program Info-K. At website 324.cat he has experimented with new formats and digital narratives. He has also worked for several newspapers, as Avui, Diari de Barcelona and El Temps.

Cafè Barcelona (Edicions Proa) is the fifth novel by Joan Carreras. His characters often don't express what they really mean. They have secrets. They are moving between Amsterdam and Barcelona, and the blame pursues them. The writer gives them another opportunity. The novel was awarded the Premi Ciutat de Barcelona at 2014.

By 2014, he also received the Premi Sant Jordi de novel·la for his novel L'àguila negra.

== Works ==
=== Story collections ===
- 1990 – Les oques van descalces (Quaderns Crema)
- 1993 – La bassa del gripau (Quaderns Crema)

=== Novels ===
- 1998 – La gran nevada (Empúries)
- 2003 – Qui va matar el Floquet de Neu (Empúries)
- 2009 – L'home d'origami (Amsterdam)
- 2012 – Carretera secundària (Proa)
- 2013 – Cafè Barcelona (Proa)
- 2015 – L'àguila negra
- 2017 – La dona del cadillac (Proa)

== Awards and honours ==
- 2012 – Premis Literaris de Cadaqués – Carles Rahola de periodisme. Postals de la nostàlgia des de Cadaqués
- 2014 – Premi Ciutat de Barcelona of Catalan literature for his book Cafè Barcelona
- 2014 – Premi Sant Jordi de novel·la for his book L'àguila negra
