= Montserrat Roig =

Catalan writer (1946–1991)

Montserrat Roig i Fransitorra
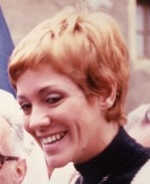
- Born: 13 June 1946; Barcelona, Spain
- Died: 10 November 1991 (aged 45); Barcelona
- Occupation: Writer
- Writing career
- Period: Late 20th century
- Genres: Novels, short stories, essays
- Notable works: El temps de les cireres (1977); Els catalans als camps nazis (1977); L'agulla daurada (1986)
- Notable awards: Premi Victor Català for Molta roba i poc sabó... i tan neta que la volen (1970); Premi Sant Jordi de novel·la for El temps de les cireres (1976); Premi Crítica Serra d'Or for Els catalans als camps nazis (1978); Premi Nacional de Literatura Catalana d'assaig for L'agulla daurada (1986)

Signature
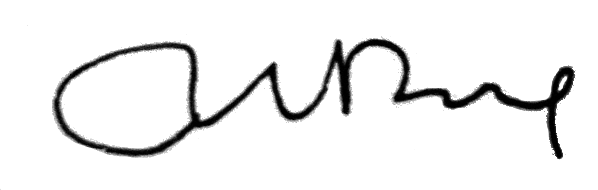

Montserrat Roig i Fransitorra (Catalan pronunciation: [munsəˈrad ˈrɔtʃ]; Barcelona, 13 June 1946 – 10 November 1991) was a Catalan writer of novels, short stories and articles.

== Biography ==
Roig was born in 1946 into a liberal middle-class family in Barcelona's Eixample neighborhood, the sixth of seven children of lawyer and writer Tomàs Roig i Llop and Albina Fransitorra. She was born and lived most of her life on Bailén Street.

=== Education ===
She began her schooling in 1951 at the Col·legi Mari del Diví Pastor, also on Bailén Street. At the age of 13, she enrolled at the Institut Montserrat, where she completed her pre-university education.

From 1961 to 1964, she studied at the Escola d'Art Dramàtic Adrià Gual (Adrià Gual School of Dramatic Arts), appearing as an actress in multiple productions. She earned a degree in philosophy and letters from the University of Barcelona in 1968 and a doctorate in 1970. Roig grew up in an intellectually rich environment; her father, Tomàs Roig i Llop, was a lawyer and playwright, and her mother, Albina Fransitorra, a feminist and defender of Catalan identity. She came of age during the Franco dictatorship, a time when Catalan language and culture were heavily repressed, which deeply influenced her later literary and political engagement.

=== Literary and academic career ===
In 1970, Roig won the Víctor Català prize for Molta roba i poc sabó... i tan neta que la volen, a compilation of short stories, and began to dedicate herself to writing literature. She began a literary cycle composed of works such as Ramona adéu (1972), which portrays three generations of women – grandmother, mother and daughter – who live their own stories with key moments in Catalan history as a background, or El temps de les cireres (1977), starring the same characters, for which Roig received the "Premi Sant Jordi de novel·la" in 1976.

L'hora violeta (1980) is the novel which culminates her feminist positioning. From then on, her novels took a different turn. Later, she published L'òpera quotidiana (1982), La veu melodiosa (1987) and a compilation of short stories with the title El cant de la joventut (1989). The last of her publications was Digues que m'estimes encara que sigui mentida (1991), where she conveys personal poetry as a literary will.

Montserrat Roig was a member of the Association of Catalan Language Writers (Associació d'Escriptors en Llengua Catalana) and vice-president of its Junta Territorial del Principat de Catalunya (Territorial Committee of the Catalan Principality) (1989–1990).

She worked as a lecturer in Catalan and Spanish at the University of Bristol, England during the academic year 1972–1973. From January to April 1983, she taught Catalan history and creative writing at the Department of Hispanic and Latin American Studies of the University of Strathclyde in Glasgow, Scotland, by invitation of the Carnegie Foundation. From January to June 1990, she taught twentieth-century Spanish literature and creative writing at the University of Arizona.

=== Political activism and journalism ===
Montserrat Roig was a feminist and a Leftist. As a young woman, she participated in the student protest movements of the last years of Francoist Spain. She was among the many Catalan intellectuals who assembled in the monastery of Montserrat to protest the Burgos Trial in 1970. She twice joined and subsequently left the Unified Socialist Party of Catalonia. Socialist Party of Catalonia). She was active in the feminist movement and published three books about women and feminism ¿Tiempo de mujer? (1980), El feminismo (1981) and Mujeres hacia un nuevo humanismo (1981).

Her work as a journalist is also remarkable, showing her will to build a tradition of cultured, feminist journalism and recover the historical memory of her country. She gained popularity as an interviewer, both in print and on television, first contributing to the magazine Serra d'Or with interviews later published in 1975 and 1976 as a series of books titled Retrats paral·lels ("Parallel portraits") In 1977 she began working for the Catalan division of Televisión Española, where she produced a program of interviews called "Personatges", later collected in two books of the same title.

Roig's 1977 nonfiction book Els catalans als camps nazis ("Catalans in the Nazi Camps"), which included testimony from Catalans who survived deportation to Nazi concentration camps, was honored with the Serra d'Or critics' prize. Her research for this book involved direct interviews with survivors and visits to former concentration camps. Roig approached the Holocaust from a humanist and testimonial perspective, seeking to restore dignity to those who had been forgotten by Spanish official narratives. Her book L'agulla daurada ("The Golden Spire"), inspired by a two-month stay in Leningrad, dealt with the siege of Leningrad during the Second World War and earned her the National Prize of Catalan Literature (essay) in 1986.

From 1984 to 1989 she was a daily columnist for El Periódico, and from September 1990 until her death she contributed regularly to the Catalan-language newspaper Avui. Her columns for Avui were published in the posthumous collection Un pensament de sal, un pessic de pebre (1992).

Roig strongly defended the role of women in Catalan society and often wrote about the need to overcome the "double silence" faced by women under dictatorship: silence as women and silence as Catalans. She was involved in movements defending women's reproductive rights and contributed to feminist congresses and publications during the Spanish transition to democracy.

=== Death ===
During her stay at the University of Arizona, Roig began to feel unwell and, upon returning to Europe, she was diagnosed with an aggressive form of breast cancer. Her final article for Avui was published the day before her death. Montserrat Roig died in Barcelona on 10 November 1991, at the age of 45, and is interred in the Montjuïc Cemetery in Barcelona.

== Awards ==
- Víctor Català Award 1970 for Molta roba i poc sabó (Lots of clothing and little soap)
- Recull-David Puig i Llensa de narración 1970 for Aquella petita volta blava
- Sant Jordi Award 1976 for El temps de les cireres (Cherry season)
- Crítica Serra d'Or Award for historical report 1978 por Els catalans als camps nazis (The Catalans in Nazi camps)
- Omnium Cultura Award 1980 for the interviews on TVE on the programme Clar i català (Clear and Catalan)
- Award for Catalan Literature by the Generalidad de Cataluña 1986 for L'agulla daurada (The golden spire)

== Works ==
- Molta roba i poc sabó... i tan neta que la volen, 1970
- Ramona, adéu, 1972
- El temps de les cireres, 1977
  - English translation by Julia Sanches, The Time of Cherries, Modern Library edition, 2026
- Els catalans als camps nazis, 1977
- L'hora violeta, 1980
- ¿Tiempo de mujer? 1980
- L'Òpera quotidiana, 1982
- L'agulla daurada, 1985, 1986 National Prize of Catalan Literature
- La veu melodiosa, 1987
- El cant de la joventut, 1989
  - English translation by Tiago Miller, The Song of Youth, shortlisted for 2022 Republic of Consciousness Prize
- Reivindicació de la senyora Clito Mestres (play), 1990
  - An English translation, The Vindication of Senyora Clito Mestres, opened at the Persephone Theatre in Saskatoon, Canada in 1997.
- Digues que m'estimes encara que sigui mentida, 1991

== Legacy ==
In 2016, on the 25th anniversary of her death, the city of Barcelona organized a series of tributes under the slogan "Roig, 25 anys". Streets and libraries in Catalonia bear her name, and her work remains essential reading in Catalan literature curricula.

== Bibliography ==
- Davies, Catherine. Contemporary Feminist Fiction in Spain: The Work of Montserrat Roig and Rosa Montero (New Directions in European Writing), 1994. Berg Publishers. ISBN 978-1859730867
