= Cèlia Suñol i Pla =

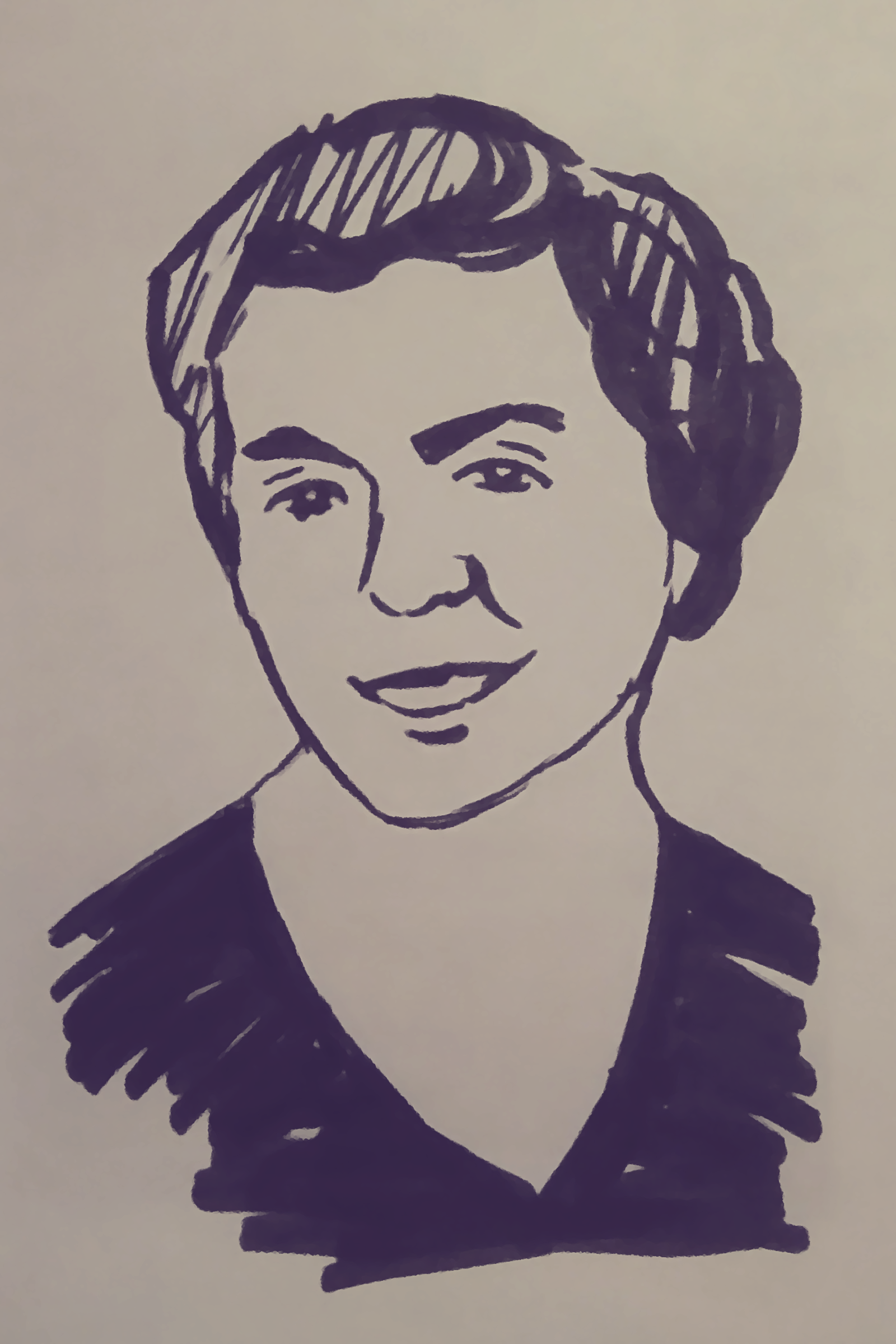
- Portrait of Cèlia Suñol
- Born: May 5, 1899; Barcelona
- Died: June 8, 1986 (aged 87); Ametlla del Vallès
- Occupation: Writer
- Notable work: Primera part; L'home de les fires i altres contes
- Spouses: Kaj Hansen (1922–1929); Joaquin Figuerola (1930–1945)
- Children: Antoni and Rosa
- Awards: Premi Sant Jordi

Signature
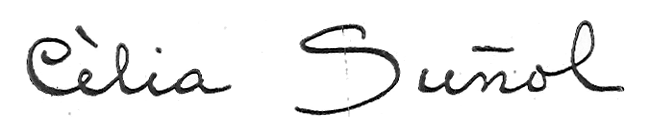

Cèlia Suñol i Pla (Barcelona, May 5, 1899 – Ametlla del Vallès, June 8, 1986) was a Catalan writer.

== Biography ==
Born in Barcelona in 1899, she was daughter of the politician Antoni Suñol i Pla and Antònia Pla i Manent. After some years of childhood and adolescence of formation and stability, his parents' deaths marked a point of inflection in his life. On 1921 she had tuberculosis and travelled to Switzerland to find a better cure. There she met Kaj Hansen, whom she married in Denmark on 1922. A year later they went together to Catalonia, and their son Antoni was born. In 1929 Hansen died. Later Cèlia Suñol married Joaquim Figuerola, and on 1931 she had a daughter, Rosa. In 1932 she joined the Ministry of Culture of the Generality of Catalonia, as a secretary. Figuerola died in 1945. Two years later, she won the Joanot Martorell novel award, currently known as Premi Sant Jordi, with her novel Primera part. In 1950 she published L'home de les fires i altres contes. She went blind at sixty-five and died on 1986 at the age of 87.

== Works published ==
- 1947 – Primera part, Barcelona, Aymà. Republished in 2014 without Francoism censorship of first edition.
- 1950 – L'home de les fires i altres contes, Barcelona, Selecta.

== Prizes and recognition ==
- Premi Joanot Martorell of novel 1947 for Primera part.
