= Emili Rosales i Castellà =

Catalan writer and editor

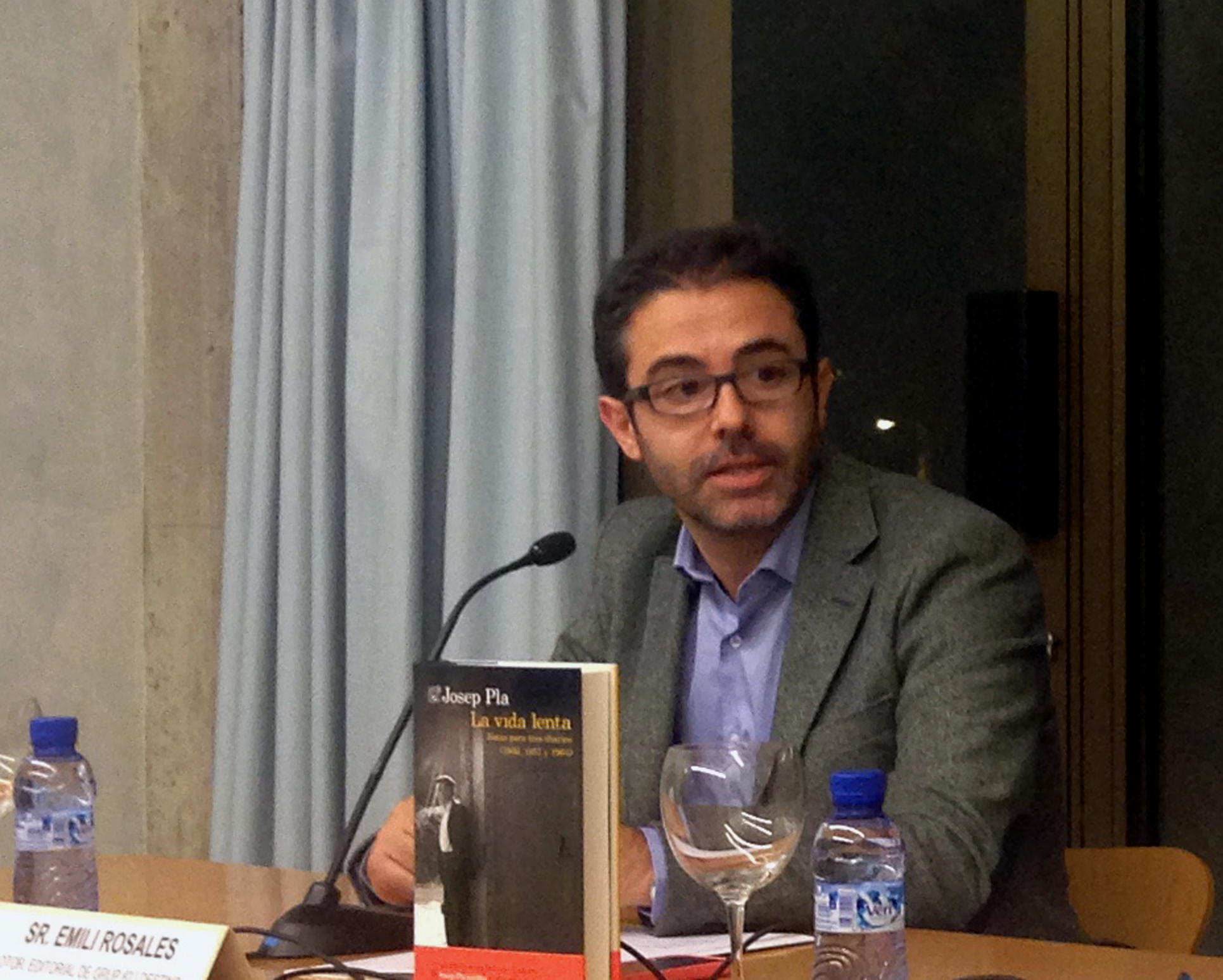
- Rosales at the presentation of La vida és lenta
- Born: Emili Rosales i Castellà; February 12, 1968 (age 58); Sant Carles de la Ràpita, Catalonia, Spain
- Occupations: writer, editor
- Years active: 1989 - present
- Awards: 2004 Sant Jordi

Emili Rosales i Castellà (born February 12, 1968) is a Catalan writer and editor. He began in the field of poetry, but quickly became a novelist. After publishing three books in four years, he dedicated five years to publish the fifth. Rosales' fifth novel was called La ciutat invisible. The novel's plot alternates between the present day and the reign of Charles III of Spain. The effort was rewarded and La ciutat invisible won the Sant Jordi award and received great reviews. The novel has been translated into Spanish and English (as The Invisible City).

Rosales has also worked as a translator and as a literature professor. He occasionally publishes book reviews in the press. He is the editorial director of Grup 62 (a publishing house) and Destino.

== Work ==
=== Poetry ===
- 1989 – Ciutats i mar
- 1991 – Els dies i tu

=== Novels ===
- 1995 – La casa de la platja
- 1997 – Els amos del món
- 1999 – Mentre Barcelona dorm
- 2005 – La ciutat invisible

== Awards ==
- 2005 – Sant Jordi for La ciutat invisible
