= Maria Aurèlia Capmany =

Spanish novelist, playwright and essayist (1918–1991)

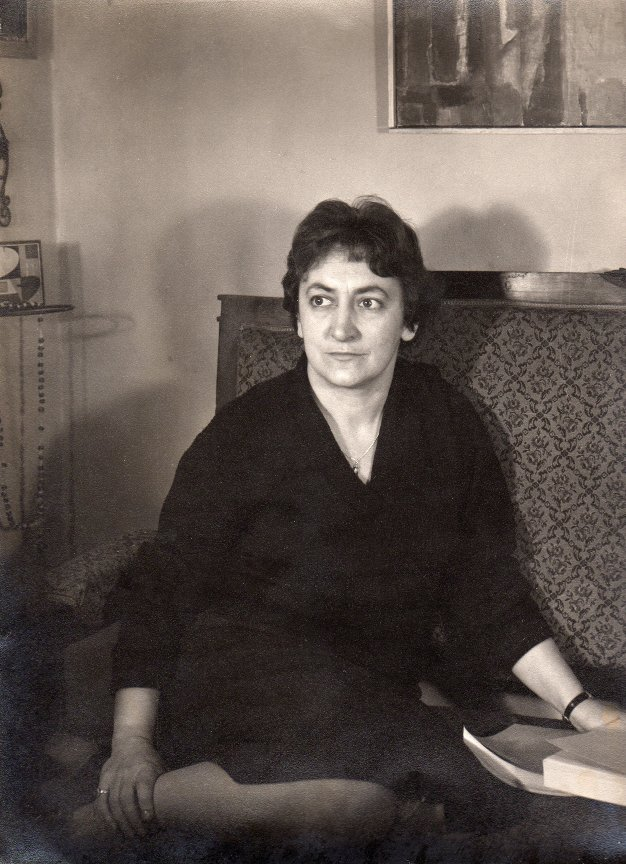
- Maria Aurelia Capmany i Farnés
- Born: 3 August 1918; Barcelona
- Died: 2 October 1991 (aged 73); Barcelona
- Writing career
- Language: Catalan and Spanish

Maria Aurelia Capmany i Farnés (3 August 1918, in Barcelona – 2 October 1991) was a Catalan novelist, playwright and essayist. She was also a prominent feminist cultural and anti-Franco activist.

Along with the writers Manuel de Pedrolo, Jordi Sarsanedas, Joan Perucho, and Josep Maria Espinàs, Capmany co-authored, Cita de narradors ("Rendezvous of Narrators") (1958), which was awarded the Josep Yxart Essay Prize.

== Biography ==
Granddaughter of Sebastià Farnés (1854–1934), intellectual author of Paremiologia catalana comparada, and daughter of Aureli Capmany i Farrés, folklorist and contributor of children's magazines, she spent her youth in the family's apartment near la Rambla in Barcelona. She studied at the Institut-Escola de la Generalitat de Catalunya and she graduated on Philosophy at the University of Barcelona after the war.

She practiced teaching during the 40s and 50s at the Institut Albéniz of Badalona and at the Escola Isabel de Villena in Barcelona. She also worked engraving glass, a job that she had learnt at University.

With her first novel Necessitem morir (We need to die) (published in 1952), she got to the final of the Joanot Martorell Price of 1947, price that she won the following year with El cel no és trasparent (The sky is not transparent). Her prestige as a narrator would arrive with novels like Betúlia, El gust de la pols (The flavour of dust) and especially for Un lloc entre els morts (A place for the death), Sant Jordi Price of 1968. In 1981 she received the Ramon Fuster Price, given by the Col·legi Oficial de Doctors i Llicenciats en Filosofia i Lletres i en Ciències de Catalunya and in 1983 she won the Premi Crítica Serra d'Or de Literatura Infantil i Juvenil with El malefici de la reina d'Hongria (The curse of the Hungarian Queen).

She was one of the most versatile Catalan writers, as apart from writing fiction, she was also devoted to translation, and she worked on the theatrical genre as well as on other literary genres.

In the field of dramaturgy, she founded in 1959 the Escola d'Art Dramàtic Adrià Gual (School of Dramatic Arts Adrià Gual) together with Ricard Salvat. She exercised as a teacher, actress and headmaster. Besides, she premiered own plays, such as Preguntes i respostes sobre la vida i la mort de Francesc Layret advocat dels obrers de Catalunya (Answers and questions about life and dead of Francesc Layret, lawyer of Catalan workers).

As an essay writer, she excelled for her works on the situation of women, especially with La dona a Catalunya: consciència i situació (The woman in Catalonia: awareness and situation) in 1966. The same year, she took part in the Caputxinada, an assembly against the Spanish dictator Franco. She also devoted many articles to several aspects of Catalan culture and society. The book of memories Pedra de toc (1 and 2), Mala memòria, and Això era i no era also excelled.

She took part and intervened in the Míting de la Llibertat (Meeting of freedom) (22 June 1976) and in the constitutional process of Socialist Party of Catalonia-Congress (November 1976).

She was councillor and responsible for Culture and Editions at Barcelona's Town Hall during the first legislatures of the Socialists' Party of Catalonia (PSC) and member of the Diputation of Barcelona, since 1983 until she died on 2 October 1991. She was also member of the Associació d'Escriptors en Llengua Catalana, and president of the Catalan PEN Club, the Catalan version of the PEN International.

== Narrative work ==
With her first novel, Necessitem morir ("We Need to Die"), published in 1952, she was a finalist for the Joanot Martorell Prize of 1947, an award she won the following year with El cel no és transparent ("The Sky Is Not Transparent").

Her prestige as a novelist came with works such as Betúlia, El gust de la pols and, above all, Un lloc entre els morts ("A Place Among the Dead"), which won the Premi Sant Jordi in 1968. In 1981 she received the Premi Ramon Fuster, awarded by the Col·legi Oficial de Doctors i Llicenciats en Filosofia i Lletres i en Ciències de Catalunya (Official College of Doctors and Graduates in Philosophy and Letters and in Sciences of Catalonia), and in 1983 she won the Premi Crítica Serra d'Or de Literatura Infantil i Juvenil with El malefici de la reina d'Hongria ("The Spell of the Queen of Hungary").

== Other genres: theatre and essay ==
She was one of the most versatile Catalan writers, since, in addition to narrative prose, she devoted herself to translation and cultivated theatre, essay, and other literary genres.

In the field of playwriting she co-founded, in 1959, the Escola d'Art Dramàtic Adrià Gual together with Ricard Salvat. There she worked as a teacher, actress, and director. She also premiered her own works there, such as Preguntes i respostes sobre la vida i la mort de Francesc Layret, advocat dels obrers de Catalunya ("Questions and Answers on the Life and Death of Francesc Layret, Lawyer of the Workers of Catalonia"), as well as a theatrical adaptation of Tirant lo Blanc.

As an essayist she stood out for her works on the situation of women; contemporary Catalan feminism is indebted to her pioneering role, through books such as La dona a Catalunya: consciència i situació (1966), El feminismo ibérico (1970), El feminisme a Catalunya (1973), and Dona i societat a la Catalunya actual (1978)

== Political activity ==
In 1966 she took part in the Caputxinada, an anti-Francoist assembly. She also published numerous articles on different aspects of Catalan culture and society. Among her memoirs are Pedra de toc (vols. 1 and 2), Mala memòria ("Bad Memory"), and Això era i no era ("This Was and Was Not").

She participated and spoke at the "Míting de la Llibertat" ("Freedom Rally") on 22 June 1976 and in the constituent process of the Socialist Party of Catalonia–Congress in November 1976.

She was a councillor and head of the areas of Culture and Publications in the Barcelona City Council during the first legislatures of the Socialists' Party of Catalonia (PSC), from 1983 to 1991, a very productive stage in which she undertook important initiatives. These included the creation of the Mercat de les Flors, with significant programming; the Museums Plan, which commissioned Gae Aulenti to design the new National Art Museum of Catalonia in the former Palau Nacional; the restoration of the historic building of the Palau de la Virreina, which became the headquarters of the councillorship and a central exhibition space; the exhibition Homenatge a Barcelona and the book collection «Diàlegs a Barcelona».

She was also a member of the Barcelona Provincial Council from 1983 until her death on 2 October 1991. In addition, she was a member of the Association of Catalan Language Writers and president of the Catalan PEN Club.

== Recognitions ==
According to the open database of street names from 2021, there are more than 80 streets or squares in Catalonia dedicated to this writer. There is a Carrer de Maria Aurèlia Capmany in Barcelona, officially approved since 23 December 1996.

Maria Aurèlia Capmany has been honoured with several distinctions throughout her life and posthumously. She received the 8 March – Maria Aurèlia Capmany Award from the Barcelona City Council, recognizing initiatives in defense and promotion of women's rights. In 2018, the Government of Catalonia declared the Year of Maria Aurèlia Capmany to commemorate the centenary of her birth. She was awarded the Creu de Sant Jordi in 1982. On the 30th anniversary of her death in 2021, the Barcelona City Council dedicated a commemorative plaque on Rambla de Catalunya, 65, where she had lived.

== Work ==
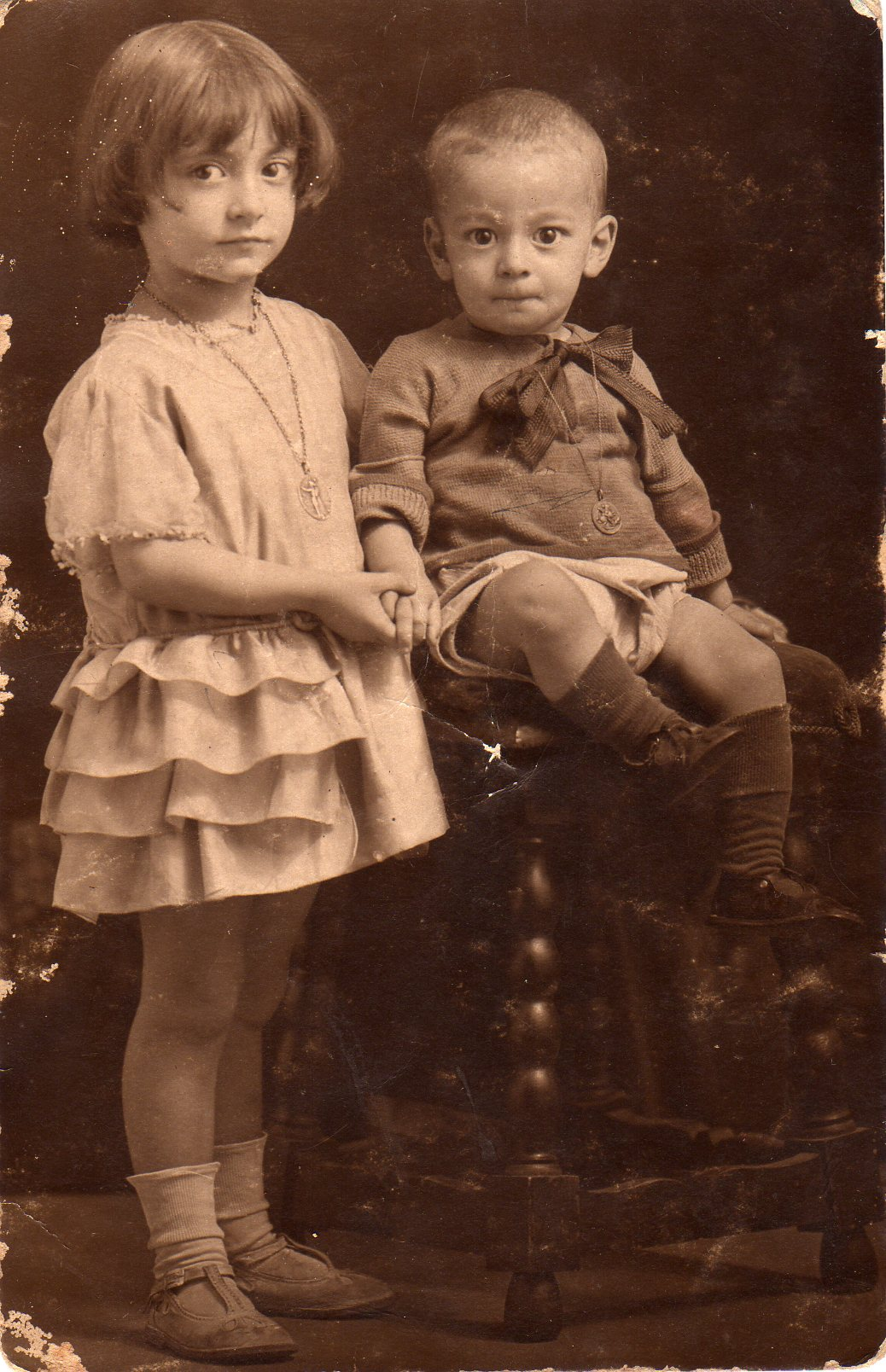
Maria Aurèlia Capmany at age 3, with her brother Jordi

=== Novel ===
- Necessitem morir. Barcelona: Aymà, 1952 / Barcelona: Proa, 1977
- L'altra ciutat. Barcelona: Selecta, 1955
- Tana o la felicitat. Palma de Mallorca: Moll, 1956
- Betúlia. Barcelona: Selecta, 1956
- Ara. Barcelona: Albertí, 1958/ Barcelona: Plaza & Janés, 1988
- Traduït de l'americà. Barcelona: Albertí, 1959
- El gust de la pols. Barcelona: Destino, 1962 / Barcelona: Edicions 62, 1986
- La pluja als vidres. Barcelona: Club Editor, 1963
- El desert dels dies. Barcelona: Occitània, 1966
- Un lloc entre els morts. Barcelona: Nova Terra, 1967 / Barcelona: Laia, 1979 / Barcelona: Edicions 62, 1984 / Barcelona: Proa, 1999
- Feliçment, jo sóc una dona. Barcelona: Nova Terra, 1969 / Barcelona: Laia, 1983 / Barcelona: Barcanova, 1994
- Vitrines d'Amsterdam. Barcelona: Club Editor, 1970
- Quim-Quima. Barcelona: Estela, 1971 / Barcelona: Laia, 1977 / Barcelona: Planeta, 1991
- El jaqué de la democràcia. Barcelona: Nova Terra, 1972 / Barcelona: La Magrana, 1987
- Vés-te'n ianqui. Barcelona: Laia, 1980 / Barcelona: Barcanova, 2006
- Lo color més blau. Barcelona: Planeta, 1983
- El cap de Sant Jordi. Barcelona: Planeta, 1988.

==== Short narrative ====
- Com una mà. Palma de Mallorca: Moll, 1952
- Cartes impertinents de dona a dona. Palma de Mallorca: Moll, 1971
- Numnius Dexter Optatur, Papa de Roma. Barcelona: Tarot, 1971
- Coses i noses. Barcelona: La Magrana, 1980
- Fumar o no fumar : vet aquí la qüestió (with Pere Calders). Barcelona: Destino, 1988
- Aquelles dames d'altres temps. Barcelona: Planeta, 1990
- De veu a veu: contes i narracions. [with Montserrat Roig]. Barcelona: Cercle de Lectors, 2001

==== Literature for children and young adults ====
- Anna, Bel i Carles. Barcelona: Lumen, 1971
- Ni teu, ni meu. Barcelona: La Galera, 1972
- L'alt rei en Jaume. Barcelona: Aymà, 1977
- Àngela i els vuit mil policies. Barcelona: Laia, 1981
- El malefici de la reina d'Hongria o Les aventures dels tres patrons de nau. Barcelona: Barcanova, 1982
- Contes. Barcelona: Publicacions de l'Abadia de Montserrat, 1993
- La rialla del mirall. Barcelona: Empúries, 1989

==== Drama ====
- Tu i l'hipòcrita. Palma de Mallorca: Moll, 1960
- Vent de garbí i una mica de por. Palma de Mallorca: Moll, 1968
- Preguntes i respostes sobre la vida i la mort de Francesc Layret, advocat dels obrers de Catalunya. [with Xavier Romeu i Jover]. París: Edicions * Catalanes de París, 1970 / Madrid: Moisés Pérez Coterillo, 1976 / Barcelona: Institut del Teatre-Diputació de Barcelona, 1992
- L'ombra de l'escorpí. València: Gorg, 1974
- El cavaller Tirant. Barcelona: Edebé, 1974
- Tirant lo Blanc. València: Eliseu Climent / 3i4, 1980
- Ca, barret! [with Jaume Vidal Alcover]. Palma de Mallorca: Moll, 1984

==== Essay ====
- Cita de narradors (with Manuel de Pedrolo, Jordi Sarsanedas, Joan Perucho i Josep M. Espinàs). Barcelona: Selecta, 1958
- Historias de Barcelona [fotografies de A. Basté]. Barcelona: Barrigotic, 1963
- La dona a Catalunya : consciència i situació. Barcelona: Ed. 62, 1966
- Dia sí, dia no : apunts sobre la nostra societat actual. Barcelona: Llibres de Sinera, 1968
- La dona catalana. Barcelona: Mateu, 1968
- Els vells. Barcelona: Mateu, 1968
- La joventut és una nova classe? Barcelona: Edicions 62, 1969
- El feminismo ibérico.. Vilassar de Mar: Oikos-tau, 1970
- De profesión mujer. Esplugues de Llobregat: Plaza & Janés, 1971
- Salvador Espriu. Barcelona: Dopesa, 1972
- El feminisme a Catalunya. Barcelona: Nova Terra, 1973
- Poema i vers o El cor salvatge de Carles Riba. Barcelona: Institut d'Estudis Hel·lènics – Departament de Filologia Catalana, Universitat de Barcelona, 1973
- Carta abierta al macho ibérico. Madrid: Ediciones 99, 1973
- El comportamiento amoroso de la mujer. Barcelona: Dopesa, 1974
- La dona. Barcelona: Dopesa, 1976
- Cada cosa en el seu temps i lectura cada dia. Barcelona: Dopesa, 1976
- Subirachs o el retreat de l'artista com a escultor adult. Barcelona: Dopesa, 1976
- La dona i la Segona República. Barcelona: Ed. 62, 1977
- Temps passat, notícia d'avui: una història de Catalunya. Barcelona: Vicens Vives, 1978
- Dies i hores de la Nova Cançó. Barcelona: Abadia de Montserrat, 1978
- Antifémina (with Colita). Madrid: Editora Nacional, 1978
- En busca de la mujer española. Barcelona: Laia, 1982
- Diàlegs a Barcelona: M. Aurèlia Capmany, Pasqual Maragall [interview transcribed by Xavier Febrés]. Barcelona: Ajuntament de Barcelona-Laia, 1984
- Retrobar Barcelona [with Jaume Sobraqués]. Barcelona: Lunwerg, 1986
- Fem memòria. El port de Barcelona. Barcelona: Lunwerg, 1990
- ¿Qué diablos es Cataluña? Madrid: Temas de hoy, 1990
- Barcelona entre mar i muntanya. Barcelona: Polígrafa, 1992

==== Memoirs ====
- Pedra de toc (2 vol.). Barcelona: Nova Terra, 1970 – 1974
- Dietari de prudències. Barcelona: La Llar del Llibre, 1981
- Mala memòria. Barcelona: Planeta, 1987
- Això era i no era. Barcelona: Planeta, 1989

==== Comic ====
- Dona, doneta, donota (with Avel·lí Artís-Gener). Barcelona: EDHASA, 1979

==== Complete work ====
- Obra completa (7 volumes). Barcelona: Columna, 1993 – 2000 (edition by Guillem-Jordi Graells)

==== Scripts ====
- L'alt rei en Jaume. Television, 1977 – 1978
- La nina. Televisió, 1977–1978 [based on Casa de nines by Ibsen].
- Tereseta-que-baixava-les-escale. Television, 1977–1978 [based on tale by Salvador Espriu]
- Aquesta nit no vindrem a sopar. Television, 1978 – 1979
- La nit catalana. Television, 1978–1979
- Temps passat, notícia d'avui. Ràdio 4, 1979
- Història de Catalunya, 1977–1978 (45 capítols). Radio. Cassette edition (1979).
- Les nits de la tieta Rosa. Television, 1980

==== Translations ====
===== From French =====
- BALZAC, Honoré de: L'última encarnació de Vautrin. Barcelona: Nova Terra, 1972
- DURAS, Marguerite: Un dic contra el pacífic [Un barrage contre le Pacifique]. Barcelona: Edicions 62, Col. El Balancí 2, 1965
- FOURNIER, Alain: El gran Meaulnes [Le grand Meaulnes]. Barcelona: Edicions 62, Col. El Trapezi 10, 1966
- KASSAK, Fred: Carambolades [Carambolages]. Barcelona: Edicions 62, Col. La cua de palla, 1963
- LAFONT, Robert: Història de la literatura occitana. Barcelona: Dopesa, Col. Pinya de Rosa 8 i 9, 1973
- PROUST, Marcel: A la recerca del temps perdut [À la recherche du temps perdu]. Barcelona: Columna, 1990–1991 [with Jaume Vidal Alcover]
- SARTRE, Jean-Paul: Fenomenologia i existencialisme [L'existencialisme est un humanisme]. Barcelona: Laia, 1982
- SIMENON, Georges: Liberty Bar. Barcelona: Edicions 62, Col. La cua de palla 28, 1965
- SIMENON, Georges: El gos groc [Le chien jaune]. Barcelona: Edicions 62, Col. La cua de palla 48, 1966 / Barcelona: Àrea, 1989 / Barcelona: Columna, 1995
- SIMENON, Georges: La nit de la cruïlla. Barcelona: Edicions 62, Col. La cua de palla, 1966
- SIMENON, Georges: L'Ombra xinesa. Barcelona: Edicions 62, Col. La cua de palla 54, 1967
- SIMENON, Georges: Maigret i el client del dissabte [Maigret et le client du samedi]. Barcelona: Edicions 62, Col. La cua de palla 62, 1968
- SIMENON, Georges: Signat Picpus [Signée Picpus]. Barcelona: Edicions 62, Col. La cua de palla 65, 1968
- STEWART, Terry: Mà forta [La belle vie]. Barcelona: Edicions 62, Col. La cua de palla 2, 1963
- VÉRY, Pierre: El senyor Marcel de la funerària. Barcelona: Edicions 62, Col. La cua de palla 19, 1964
- VÉRY, Pierre: Goupi Mans-Roges [Goupi Mans-Rouges]. Barcelona: Edicions 62, Col. La cua de palla 16, 1964

===== From Italian =====
- CALVINO, Italo: El baró rampant [Il barone rampante]. Barcelona: Edicions 62, Col. El Balancí 7, 1965 / Barcelona: Avui, 1995
- CASSOLA, Carlo: La tala del bosc [Il taglio del bosco]. Barcelona: Edicions 62, Col. El Trapezi 8, 1966
- CHIARINI, Luigi: Art i tècnica del film [Arte e tecnica del film]. Barcelona: Edicions 62, Col. A l'abast 13, 1967
- LIONNI, Leo: Frederick. Barcelona: Lumen, 1969
- PASOLINI, Pier Paolo: Una vida violenta [Una vita violenta]. Barcelona: Edicons 62, Col. El Balancí 32, 1967
- PAVESE, Cesare: La lluna i les fogueres [La luna e il falò]. Barcelona: Edicions 62, Col. El Balancí 12, 1965
- PIRANDELLO, Luigi: Aquesta nit improvisem [Questa notte si recita a soggetto]. Barcelona: Institut del Teatre-Diputació de Barcelona, 1996
- PRATOLINI, Vasco: Crònica dels pobres amants [Cronache di poveri amanti]. Barcelona: Edicions 62, Col. El Balancí 1, 1965
- PRATOLINI, Vasco: Metel·lo [Metello]. Barcelona: Edicions 62, Col. El Balancí 15, 1966
- VITTORINI, Elio: Conversa a Sicília [Conversazione in Sicilia]. Barcelona: Edicions 62, Col. El Balancí 19, 1966

===== From English =====
- CAIN, James M.: Doble indemnització [Double Indemnity]. Barcelona: Edicions 62, Col. La cua de palla 28, 1965

== Fonts bibliogràfiques i documentals ==
- Caampillo, Maria i Castellanos, Jordi (1988). “Maria Aurèlia Capmany”, en Història de la literatura catalana, vol. 11. Barcelona: Ariel, pàgs. 62–71.
- Dale may, Barbara (2000). “Maria Aurèlia Capmany y el activismo polifacético” en Breve historia feminista de la literatura española (en lengua catalana, gallega y vasca), Vol. VI, Iris M. Zavala (coord.). Barcelona: Anthropos, pàgs. 92–99.
- DD.AA. (1986). Maria Aurèlia Capmany en els seus millors escrits. Barcelona: Miquel Arimany editor.
- DD.AA. (1991). Montserrat Roig/ Maria Aurèlia Capmany en homenatge. Barcelona: Institució de les Lletres Catalanes.
- DD.AA. (1992). Maria Aurèlia Capmany Farnés (1918–1991). Barcelona: Ajuntament de Barcelona.
- DD.AA. (2002). Un lloc entre els vius. Homenatge a Maria Aurèlia Capmany. Barcelona: Partit dels Socialistes de Catalunya.
- DD.AA. (1992). Maria Aurèlia Capmany: homenatge. Barcelona: Ajuntament de Barcelona/Centre Català del Pen Club.
- DD.AA. (1993). Catalan Review. International Journal of Catalan Culture. Woman, History and Nation in the Works of Montserrat Roig and Maria Aurèlia Capmany. Vol. VII, núm. 2.
- DD.AA. (1994). Feliçment sóc una dona: homenatge a Maria Aurèlia Capmany. Barcelona: Ajuntament de Barcelona.
- DD.AA. (2002). “Universos” dins l'Univers: elles hi són: Jornada homenatge a Maria Aurèlia Capmany i Montserrat Roig. Barcelona: Institut Català de la Dona.
- Fundació Maria Aurèlia Capmany i Reñé Ferrando, Teresa (2002). Ciutadana Maria Aurèlia Capmany: escriptora i dona d'acció. Barcelona: Fundació Maria Aurèlia Capmany.
- Graells, Guillem-Jordi (1990). “Maria Aurèlia Capmany, un bosc per a viure-hi”, Serra d'Or, març 1990.
- (1992). Maria Aurèlia Capmany. Barcelona: Diputació de Barcelona.
- (1992). “Presentació”, Preguntes i respostes sobre la vida i la mort de Francesc Layret, advocat dels obrers de Catalunya, Maria Aurèlia Capmany i Xavier Romeu. Barcelona: Institut del Teatre.
- (1992). “La narrativa de Maria Aurèlia Capmany, un calidoscopi fascinant”, Maria Aurèlia Capmany Farnés (1918–1991). Barcelona: Ajuntament de Barcelona, pàgs. 95–128.
- (1993). “La producció literària de Maria Aurèlia Capmany I. La novel·la (a)”, Obra Completa I de Maria Aurèlia Capmany. Barcelona: Columna, pàgs. IX-XXVIII.
- (1994). “La producció literària de Maria Aurèlia Capmany II. La novel·la (b)”, Obra Completa II de Maria Aurèlia Capmany. Barcelona: Columna, pàgs.IX-XXIII.
- (1995). “La producció literària de Maria Aurèlia Capmany III. La novel·la (c)”, Obra Completa III de Maria Aurèlia Capmany. Barcelona: Columna, pàgs.XI-XXIII.
- (1996). “La producció literària de Maria Aurèlia Capmany IV. La narrativa breu. Apèndix: El cel no és transparent”, Obra Completa IV de Maria Aurèlia Capmany. Barcelona: Columna, pàgs. XI-XXV.
- (1998). “La producció literària de Maria Aurèlia Capmany V. Teatre”, Obra Completa V de Maria Aurèlia Capmany. Barcelona: Columna, pàgs.XI-XXXVIII.
- (1997). “La producció literària de Maria Aurèlia Capmany 6. Memòries”, ”, Obra Completa VI de Maria Aurèlia Capmany. Barcelona: Columna, pàgs. XI-XXII.
- (2000). ““La producció literària de Maria Aurèlia Capmany VII. La dona”, Obra Completa VII de Maria Aurèlia Capmany. Barcelona: Columna, pàgs. V-XII.
- Julià, Lluïsa (1999). “Quan les dones fumen. Maria Aurèlia Capmany-Simone de Beauvoir”, Memòria de l'aigua. Onze escriptores i el seu món, Lluïsa Julià (ed.), Barcelona: Proa, pàg. 89–122.
- Nadal, Marta (1991). “Maria Aurèlia Capmany: Combativity and tenderness in a writer from Barcelona”, Catalan Writing, núm. 7. pàgs. 25–37.
- Pablos, M. del Mar (2001). El fons documental Vidal-Capmany dipositat a la biblioteca de la Universitat Rovira i Virgili: tractament i descripció. Tarragona: Universitat Rovira i Virgili.
- Palau, Montserrat (2008). Maria Aurèlia Capmany. Escriure la vida en femení, Tarragona: Arola.
- Palau, Montserrat i Martínez Gili, Raül-David (eds.) (2002). Maria Aurèlia Capmany: l'afirmació en la paraula, Valls: Cossetània.
- Pedrolo, Manuel de (1974). “Impressions-expressions sobre tres novel·les de la Maria Aurèlia Capmany”, Obra Completa. vol. I. Barcelona: Editorial Nova Terra.
- Pessarrodona, Marta (1996). Maria Aurèlia Capmany, un retrat. (Fotografies de Pilar Aymeric). Barcelona: Institut Català de la Dona.
- Pons, Agustí (2000). Maria Aurèlia Capmany. L'època d'una dona. Barcelona: Columna.
- Sarsanedas, Jordi (1958). “Llegeixo les novel·les de Maria Aurèlia Capmany”, Cita de narradors. Barcelona: Ed. Selecta.
- Vidal Alcover, Jaume (1986). Maria Aurèlia Capmany en els seus millors escrits. Barcelona: Miquel Arimany editor, pàgs. 7–31.
- Jaume Vidal Alcover i Maria Aurèlia Capmany a escena. (2012)

== Archives and Documentation ==
The archive and bibliographic collection of Jaume Vidal i Alcover and Maria Aurèlia Capmany i Farnés was bequeathed to the Faculty of Philosophy and Letters of Tarragona in 1991, in accordance with the testamentary dispositions of both. This became the Vidal-Capmany Collection, located at the Library of the CRAI Campus Catalunya of the University Rovira i Virgili in Tarragona, and it is accessible to researchers and interested parties.
