= Gemma Ruiz i Palà =

Catalan journalist and writer

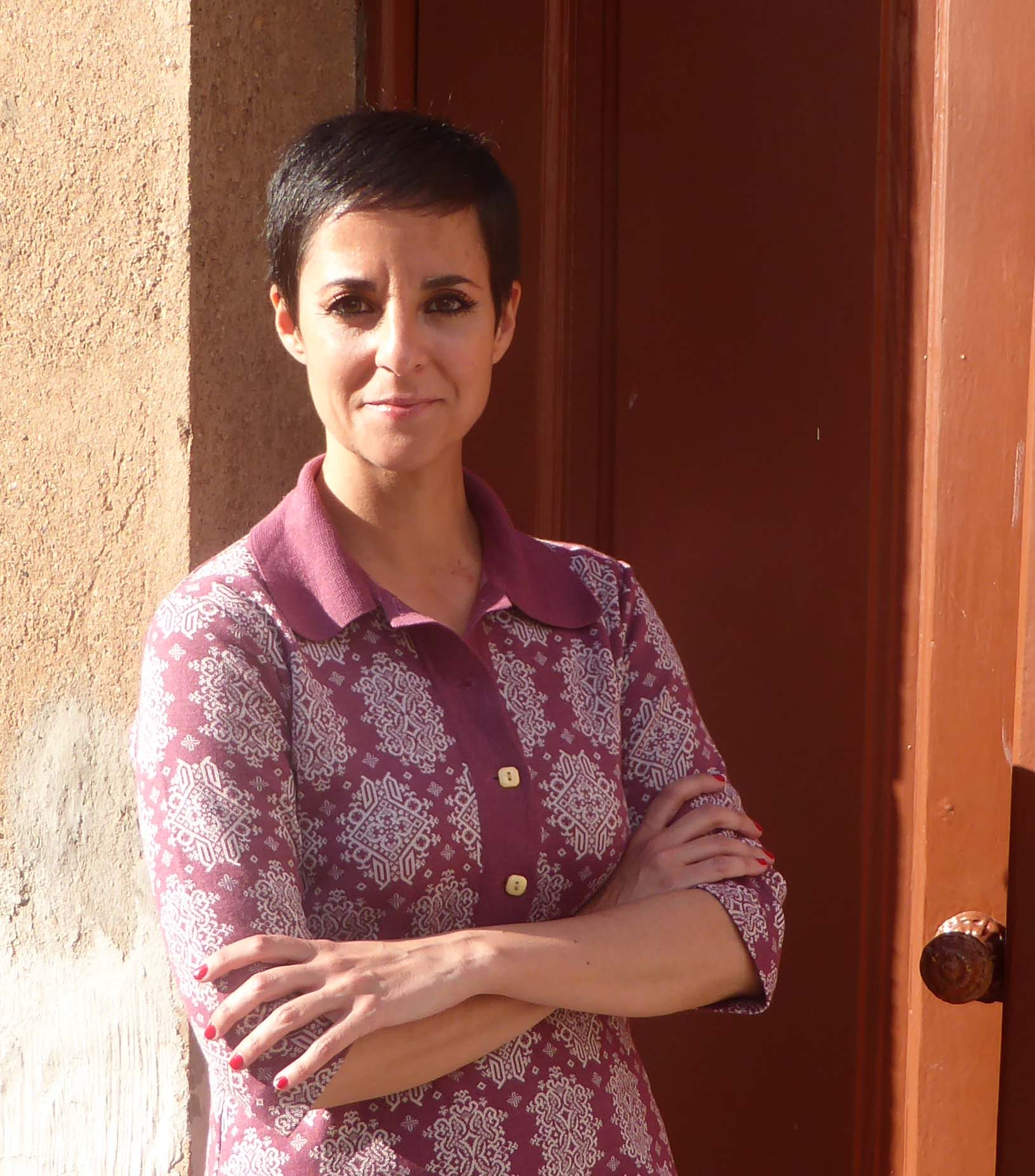
- Gemma Ruiz in 2017
- Born: Gemma Ruiz i Palà; 1975; Sabadell
- Occupation: Journalist & writer

Gemma Ruiz i Palà (Sabadell, December 6, 1975) is a Catalan journalist and writer.

As a journalist, she has worked since 1997 in the news service of Televisió de Catalunya and has specialized in cultural chronicles for Telenotícies. For six years, she made the theatrical chronicles in the TV show La nit al dia. As a writer, she published her first novel, Argelagues, in September 2016. The work focuses on the lives of three women born to farmers at the beginning of the 20th century who have to make their way to the city, working in the textile industry, participating in the Spanish Civil War from the rear and risking their lives at various times. The work was a bestseller and, by March 2017, nine editions had already been made and more than 15,000 copies had been sold in the Catalan language.

In February 2020, she published her second novel, Ca la Wenling. In 2022, she won the Sant Jordi novel Prize with the novel Les nostres mares.

Her works, written in Catalan language, have been translated to Spanish, English, French and Italian.

== Works ==
- Argelagues (2016)
- Ca la Wenling (2020)
- Les nostres mares (2022). Premi Sant Jordi 2022
