= Antònia Vicens =

Spanish writer in the Catalan language (born 1941)

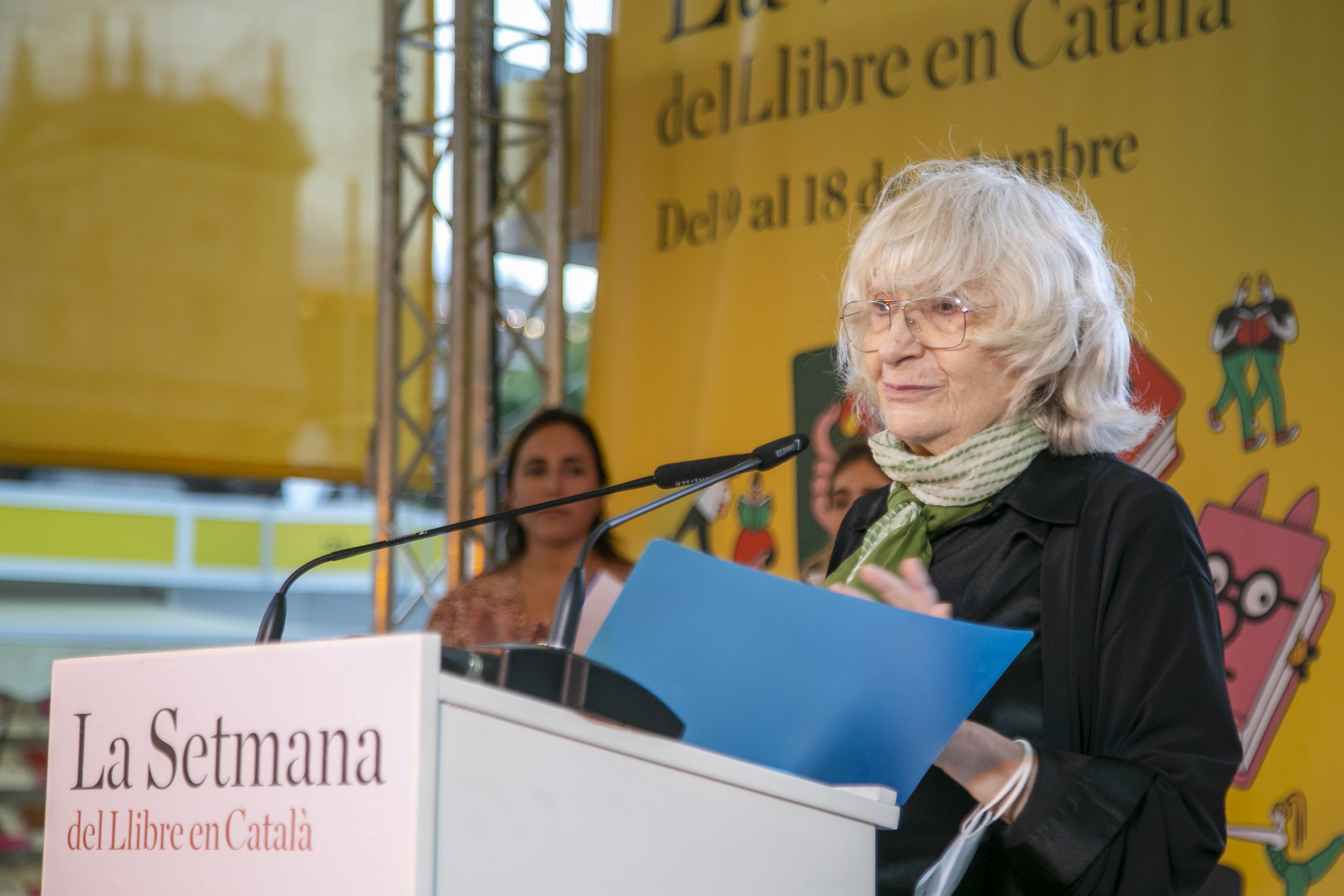
Vicens in 2022

Antònia Vicens i Picornell (born 1941) is a Majorcan writer in the Catalan language. She is a recipient of the Premi Sant Jordi de novel·la prize and the Premi d'Honor de les Lletres Catalanes.

== Biography ==
Antònia Vicens i Picornell was born on 27 March 1941 in Santanyí, Balearic Islands.

Her first published book was a collection of short stories, Banc de fusta . Her novel, 39º a l'ombra, was awarded the Premi Sant Jordi de novel·la prize in 1967. In 1977, she joined the board of the Associació d'Escriptors en Llengua Catalana, serving as vice president for the Balearic Islands. She received international recognition after being honored with the Creu de Sant Jordi in 1999 and the Ramon Llull medal in 2004, which she gave back in protest at the government's Spanish language policy. Vicens writes for adults and children. Her books have been translated into German and Spanish.

== Selected works ==
- 1968, 39º a l'ombra
- 1971, Material de fulletó
- 1974, La festa de tots els morts
- 1980, La Santa
- 1982, Quilòmetres de tul per a un petit cadàver
- 1984, Gelat de maduixa
- 1987, Terra seca
- 1997, L'àngel de la lluna
- 1998, Massa tímid per lligar
- 1998, Febre alta
- 2002, Lluny del tren
- 2007, Ungles perfectes
