= Joaquim Pijoan i Arbocer =

Spanish painter and writer

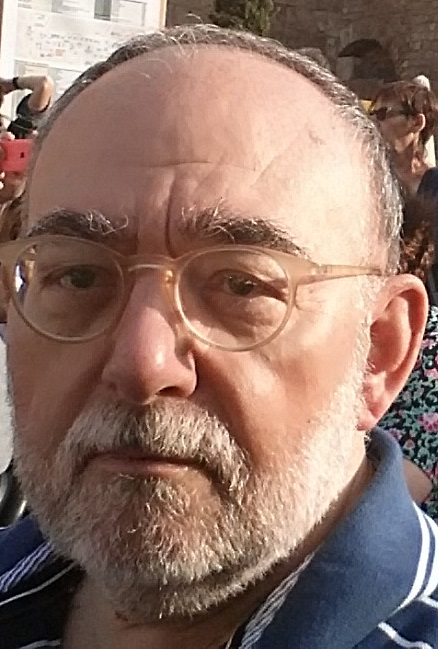
- Born: 27 March 1948 (age 78); Santa Cristina d'Aro, Catalonia, Spain
- Occupations: Writer and painter
- Writing career
- Language: Catalan
- Notable works: Sayonara Barcelona (2007); Amor a Venècia (2007)
- Notable awards: 1983. Documenta; 2006: Sant Jordi

Joaquim Pijoan (Santa Cristina d'Aro, Baix Empordà, 27 March 1948) is a Spanish painter and writer from Catalonia.

His published works are Somni (1983), Sayonara Barcelona (2007) and Amor a Venècia (2007). He considers painting as his passion, but he has become famous by two literary awards: the Documenta (1982) by Somni and, especially, the Premi Sant Jordi de novel·la (2006) for his work Sayonara Barcelona. The only material published between these two dates was in Revista de Girona.

== Sayonara Barcelona ==
Sayonara Barcelona, his second novel was published in 2007. He received the Premi Sant Jordi de novel·la, an award by Òmnium Cultural, in 2006.

=== Plot ===
Abraham is a painter who left Barcelona twenty-five years ago without telling anyone, abandoning the people he knew, including a young woman who was pregnant with his child. Now, having spent decades living in Japan, he returns to bid farewell to the city and the life he left behind, with no intention of coming back. But Abraham finds that the city, like himself, has changed. Having grown deeply attached to Japanese culture, he feels increasingly estranged from the West, his former friends and, above all, Barcelona itself, which has become a kind of theme park where hearing Catalan spoken on the streets is increasingly rare.

This novel is written, first with narrator in third person who observes his characters, so that even as he is found as a character in the novel, as a private detective who follows them. Sentences in first person can also be found with the characters narrating their views. These effects give polyphony in the novel.

== Bibliography ==
- Pijoan, Joaquim (2007). Diari del pintor JP. L'Abadia de Montserrat. ISBN 9788484158899.
