= Max Cahner =

Max Cahner i Garcia
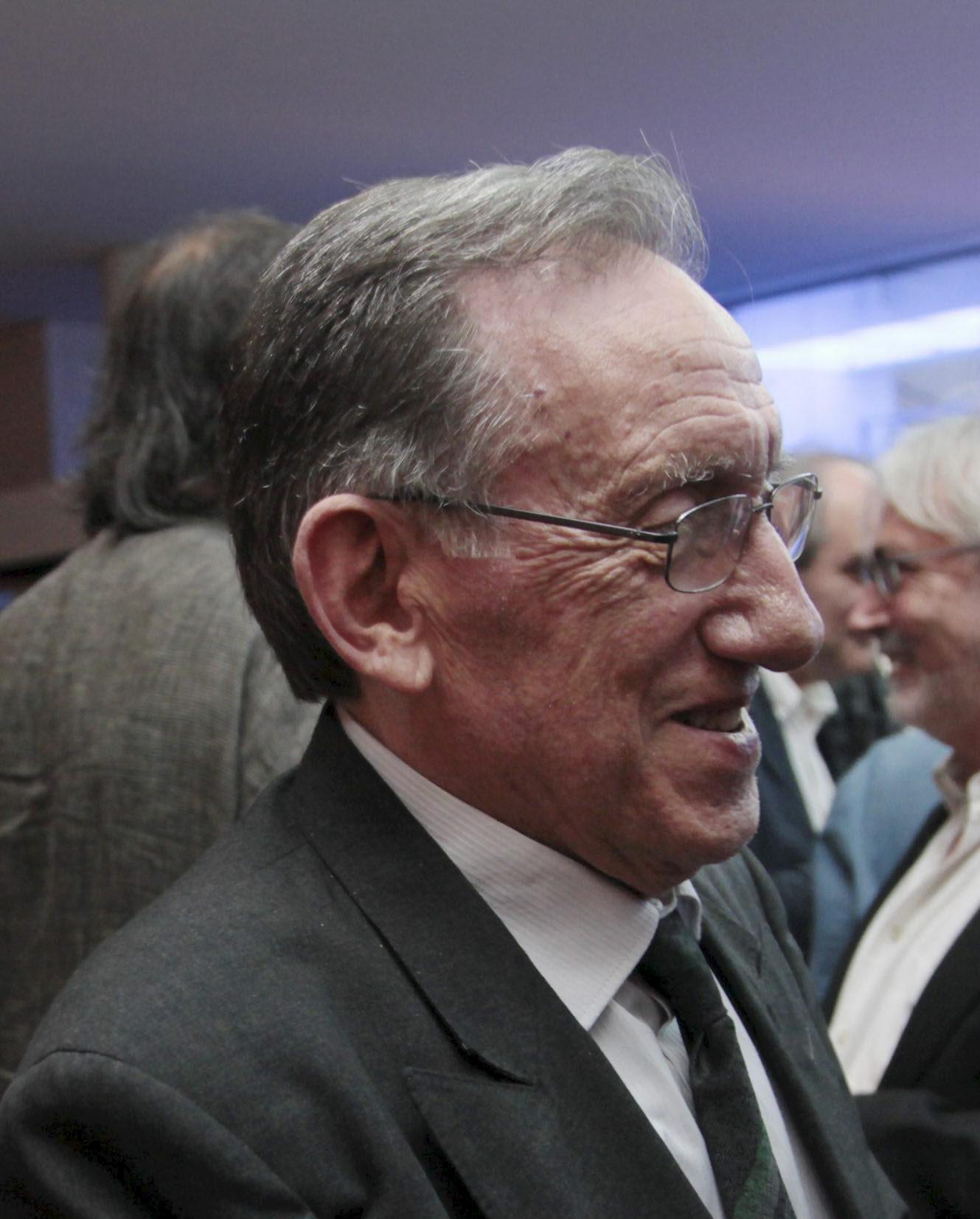
- Cahner in 2012
- Born: 3 December 1936; Bad Godesberg, Bonn, Germany
- Died: 14 October 2013 (aged 76); Barcelona
- Known for: politician and historian of Catalan literature
- Political party: Democratic Convergence of Catalonia

Max Cahner i Garcia (3 December 1936 – 14 October 2013) was a Catalan politician, and editor and historian of Catalan literature.

== Career ==
Cahner was born in Bad Godesberg, now a municipal district of Bonn, Germany, to a Jewish-Catalan father and a Catalan mother who had left during the Spanish Civil War. The Cahner family moved to Galicia in 1937 to avoid persecution from the rise of National Socialism, and then to Barcelona in 1939. He enrolled at the University of Barcelona in 1952 studying chemistry.

Via Ramon Bastardes, Cahner was introduced to and began working on Serra d'Or, an influential Catalan magazine published by Santa Maria de Montserrat Abbey. In 1964, he was expelled from Francoist Spain for his Catalan nationalist activity. From exile he continued he work on Catalan literature.

In 1980, Cahner was appointed the Minister of Culture in the Generalitat de Catalunya under Jordi Pujol, where he served for four years until 1984, when Joan Rigol took his place.

In 1986, Cahner joined the Democratic Convergence of Catalonia, where he led the party's cultural work, and was elected as an MP in the 1988 elections.

He died, aged 76, in 2013, and was posthumously awarded the Gold Medal of the Generalitat of Catalonia.

Political offices
New office	Minister of Culture of the Generalitat de Catalunya; 1980–1984	Succeeded by Joan Rigol
