= El Punt =

1979–2011 Catalonian nationalist newspaper

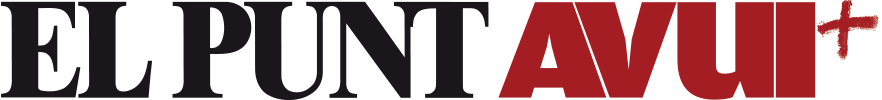
- Logo of El Punt Avui
- Type: Daily newspaper
- Owner: Hermes Comunicacions
- Editor: Emili Gispert
- Founded: 24 February 1979
- Ceased publication: 31 July 2011
- Political alignment: Catalanism, Left
- Language: Catalan
- Headquarters: Santa Eugènia 42, Girona
- Circulation: 25,800 (2005)

El Punt (Catalan pronunciation: [əl ˈpun], lit. 'The Point') was a Catalan daily newspaper based in Girona, Catalonia (Spain). The newspaper was renamed in 1990 from the original Punt Diari ('Daily Point'). It was published between 24 February 1979 and 31 July 2011.

== History and profile ==
The newspaper was founded on 24 February 1979. In the beginning the paper was only circulated in the province of Girona, but from 11 September 2004 it became available in the province of Barcelona. By 2008 it had seven editions: Barcelona, Girona, Barcelonès nord, Maresme, Camp de Tarragona-Terres de l'Ebre, Penedès, and Vallès Occidental.

On 31 July 2011, the newspaper merged with the newspaper Avui, creating the new newspaper El Punt Avui. El Punt, however, kept its own edition for the Girona area, where the original El Punt newspaper began.

The Catalan government subsidised those Catalan newspapers with at least one Catalan language edition. In 2008, El Punt was the most subsidised of all in terms of circulation and funds granted, having received almost two million euros, which amounts to 72 euros a year per newspaper sold per day, or almost 20 Euro cent per newspaper actually sold.
