= Serra d'Or =

Catalonian magazine

- Director: Josep Massot i Muntaner
- Frequency: Monthly
- First issue: October 1959
- Country: Catalonia
- Language: Catalan

Serra d'Or (Catalan pronunciation: [ˈsɛrə ˈðɔɾ]) is a Catalan magazine that appeared in October 1959. It was promoted by a group of university students, and was published by the Montserrat abbey press, with a monthly circulation of 8.000 copies.

== Origins ==
The origins of the magazine can be traced in 1946. During the Virgin of Montserrat coronation festivities in 1947, even though the conditions were difficult, there was a meeting between Catalan intellectuals and the Benedictine monks of the Montserrat abbey. In that moment there were two publications that were sponsored by the Montserrat abbey, and that have been born separately: Germinàbit, which was a magazine for the old singers of the abbey's choir, and Serra d'Or, which was the magazine for the abbey's workers. At the end of 1959, the two magazines were merged into one. The Germinàbit staff (Enric Bastardes and Max Cahner, that had entered due to Josep Benet) became part then of the one of Serra d'Or. This is why the magazine said "2nd period".

== History and development ==
From the beginning this magazine became a platform for the Catalan intellectuals of the second half of the 20th century, taking profit from the possibilities of cultural and political activity that existed in Francoist Spain, if the censorship could be avoided. Owing to the Call to the young writers (which is made still every year for writers that are younger than thirty years old) some important writers appeared, such as Montserrat Roig, Oriol Pi de Cabanyes, Carme Riera, Baltasar Porcel, or Terenci Moix. These ones, and many other ones, who are important for the Catalan literature, published their first articles in Serra d'Or.

From 1964 until 1995, it has been directed by the monk Maur Maria Boix, who has been replaced by Josep Massot i Muntaner. Since 1963 Jordi Sarsanedas has been editor in chief. This post is held today by Marta Nadal.

After Spain's transition to democracy, the magazine continued but only in the cultural area, and the political matters were generally excluded, so that it could not be in favour of one group or another. Nowadays there are collaborators from all the political tendencies.

Among the board members there are several important people in the Catalan culture: Antoni Maria Badia i Margarit, Oriol Bohigas, Ramon Bastardes, Sebastià Benet, Josep M. Bricall, Max Cahner, Jordi Carbonell, Josep M. Castellet, Alexandre Cirici, Joan Colomines, Xavier Fàbregas (that replaced Joan Triadú), Joaquim Molas, Miquel Porter i Moix, Antoni de Rosselló, Josep Termes, Francesc Vallverdú and Jordi Ventura i Subirats.

The magazine has many collaborators, that come from different ideologies, and it has also a varied list of topics, such as politics, design, architecture and urbanism, religion, economy, arts, cinema, theatre, language, literature, and so on.

During the 1960s, the Serra d'Or Critics prizes were established. They have the following categories: novel, tales, poetry, translation, literature for the young, critics and theatre.
