= David Castillo (author) =

- Born: Barcelona, Spain
- Occupations: Writer, journalist
- Writing career
- Genres: Fiction, non-fiction
- Notable works: As de Corazones (2023); La vida en tiempos de guerra (2024)

David Castillo is an Andorran writer and journalist born in Barcelona, Spain. He is the author of the novel As de Corazones (2023), the non-fiction book La vida en tiempos de guerra (2024) and As de Corazones: La venganza (2026). He is also a documentary producer and directed, produced and co-presented the documentary Chipre: La isla dividida (Cyprus: The Divided Island), which deals with the division of the Mediterranean island of Cyprus since the 1960s.

== Early life and career ==
David Castillo was born in Barcelona, Spain, and later became a resident of Andorra. He studied Labour Relations, specialising in labour law, and worked briefly as a lawyer before moving into media and literary work. He worked for about ten years in radio and television as a contributor, producer and presenter. At the same time he founded a strategic consulting firm with offices in several countries.

== Literary work ==
=== As de Corazones (2023) ===
In 2023, Castillo published his first novel, As de Corazones, through Editorial Universo de Letras, an imprint of Grupo Planeta. The novel is a thriller that follows a journalist involved in the investigation of a serial killer, with a plot set in several Spanish cities and in Paris.

The book was presented at literary events and book fairs in several Spanish cities, including Barcelona, Madrid and Palma de Mallorca. The publisher gave the work its "Maestría" seal, which it uses internally to highlight selected publications.

=== La vida en tiempos de guerra (2024) ===
In 2024, Castillo published La vida en tiempos de guerra, a non-fiction book released by Grupo Planeta. The book collects 26 testimonies from people affected by the war in Ukraine and includes an interview with Ukrainian President Volodymyr Zelenskyy. Castillo is the only journalist in Europe to whom the Ukrainian president granted a personal interview.

The book was promoted through presentations in several Spanish cities and featured at cultural and literary events around the time of its release.

=== As de Corazones: La venganza (2026) ===
In 2026, Castillo published As de Corazones: La venganza through Editorial Universo de Letras, an imprint of Grupo Planeta. The novel is the second part of the thriller of the same name and resolves the mystery behind the killings committed by the Ace of Hearts murderer.

== Documentary work ==
=== Chipre: La isla dividida (2025) ===
Castillo directed and presented the documentary Chipre: La isla dividida (Cyprus: The Divided Island), which examines the political division of Cyprus. The documentary premiered in September 2025 in Nicosia at the Ledra Palace Hotel, located in the United Nations buffer zone. The premiere was attended by diplomats, local authorities and media representatives.

The documentary includes interviews with political representatives from both sides of the island and with United Nations officials involved in the Cyprus issue.

Because of the documentary's informational rigour and neutrality on the Cyprus problem, the authorities of the self-proclaimed Turkish Republic of Northern Cyprus, recognised only by Turkey and then led by Ersin Tatar, declared Castillo banned and prohibited him from entering the TRNC for just over a year. When Ersin Tatar lost the election, the entry ban was lifted with immediate effect.

In 2026 the production company signed a distribution agreement with Espresso Media International so that the documentary can be seen anywhere in the world, and it was presented at MIPCOM in Cannes as the new release of the year.

The documentary is part of the official selection of the Altavilla Film Fest (Italy) and was a finalist at the European Cinema & ScreenPlay Festival (Oslo).

== Public activity ==
Castillo has taken part in book presentations and literary events in Spain and other countries in connection with his published works.

He has also been received by public officials in connection with his work, including the Mayor of Paris, Anne Hidalgo, the Head of Government of Andorra, Xavier Espot, as well as various ambassadors and mayors.

He has publicly advocated for human rights in Cyprus, including his stated intention to bring concerns about alleged human rights violations before the United Nations Human Rights Committee.

Through his human rights advocacy in Cyprus, he succeeded in getting the Government of the Republic of Cyprus to remove signs installed at the checkpoints that distinguished Turkish Cypriots from other citizens. Castillo had reported this practice, which he considered a violation of human rights, to the United Nations Human Rights Committee. After his complaint the signs were removed.

He also denounced the Government of the Republic of Cyprus because, despite a commitment he personally obtained from President Nikos Christodoulides during an exclusive interview, the razor wire installed in residential and sensitive areas of Nicosia had not been removed, putting residents of those areas at risk, especially children. The razor wire was eventually removed, and Cypriots thanked Castillo with several signs for his work in making the affected areas safer.

He also filed a complaint against the Ambassador of Cyprus to Spain, Michalis Ioannou, and the consul, Christina Makridou, for violating press freedom and, as a result, human rights. Spain even considered withdrawing the agrément of both diplomats. The Cypriot Ministry of Foreign Affairs eventually dismissed consul Christina Makridou, who ended her mission in Spain.

He has also been interviewed by major international media, including the BBC, in the context of his documentary work and his public statements on human rights issues.

== Awards and recognition ==
In 2024, Castillo's novel As de Corazones received an honourable mention at the International Latino Book Awards.

In the same year, La vida en tiempos de guerra was recognised with a medal of honour for merit awarded by the Government of Ukraine for his work on the book.

He has recently been included in a proposal to the Government of Cyprus to declare him an honorary citizen for his work in defending human rights in Cyprus and in raising awareness of the Cyprus problem.
