= Aymà =

Spanish publisher

- Status: Defunct
- Founded: 1942
- Founder: Jaume Aymà i Ayala, Jaume Aymà i Mayol,
- Country of origin: Spain
- Headquarters location: Barcelona

Aymà was a Spanish publishing house founded in Barcelona by Jaume Aymà i Ayala and his son, Jaume Aymà i Mayol. It was the first company to release books in Catalan under the Franco dictatorship (1939-1975).

== History ==
Created in 1942, the publishing house took its name from its founders, although the legal name went through various stages: Ediciones Aymà, Aymà Editor, Aymà SL Editores, and (from 1957 until its closure in 1983) Aymà Sociedad Anónima Editora. In 1962, father and son sold their shares to businessman Joan Baptista Cendrós, who assumed control of the society. Cendrós appointed Joan Oliver as literary director and incorporated book collections from other publishing houses into the company. In 1983, after ceasing activities, the corporation transferred some of its collections to the Enciclopèdia Catalana Foundation.

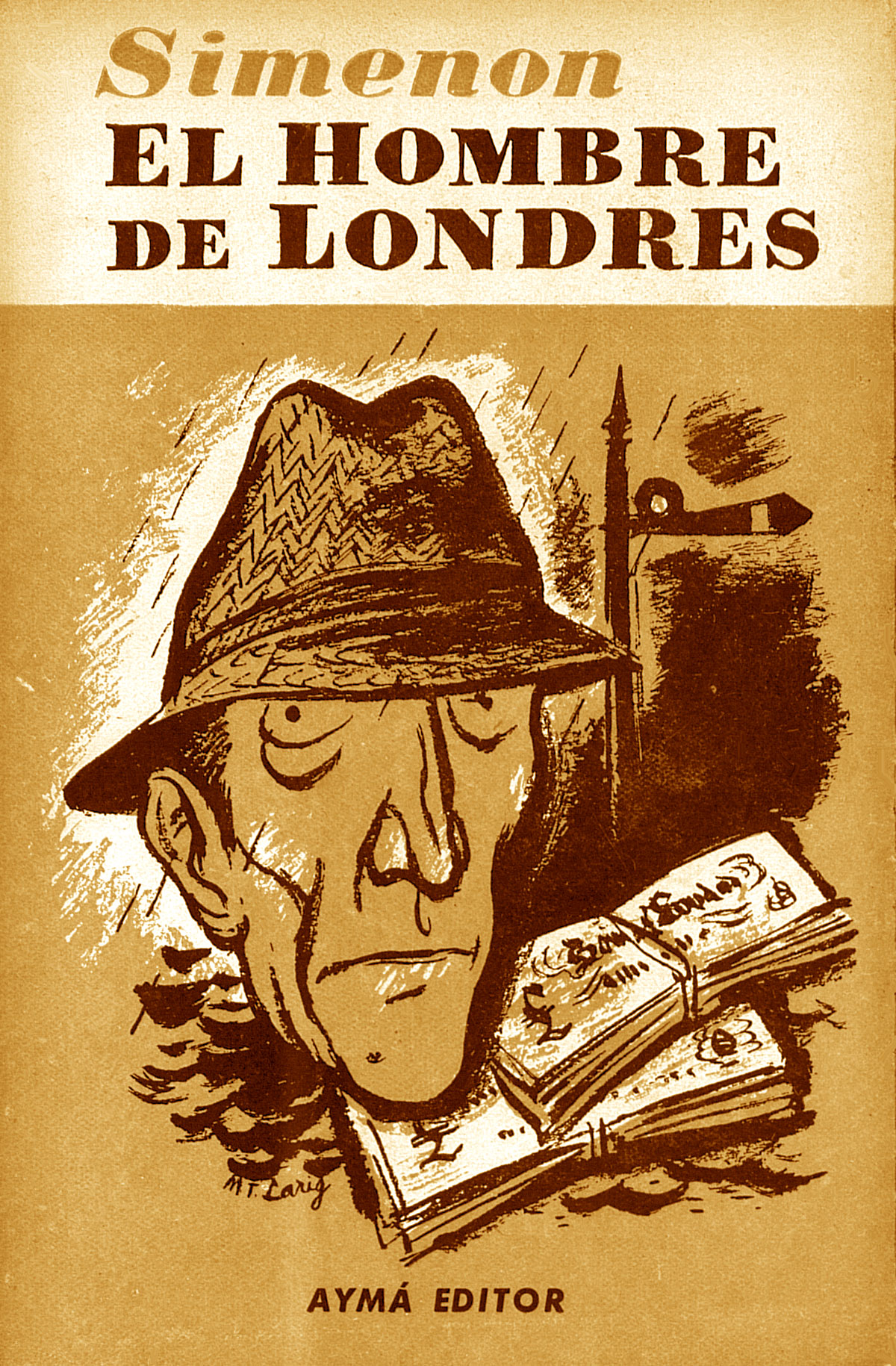
Cover of the novel El hombre de Londres, by Georges Simenon, published by Editorial Aymà in 1948

Despite their desire to resume publishing in Catalan, which had been halted by the establishment of the Francoist regime following the Spanish Civil War, the Aymàs had no choice but to begin their venture by printing books in Spanish. They initially opted for novels by foreign authors who had achieved international renown, such as Pearl S. Buck, G. K. Chesterton or Margaret Mitchell; the translation of Mitchell’s novel Gone with the Wind sold thousands of copies in a few days. They also focused on popular genres like detective fiction, notably by publishing the books of the French writer Georges Simenon, creator of Inspector Maigret; later, in the 1960s, the firm introduced the work of the British novelist Ian Fleming, author of the spy series popularized by the James Bond films.

In 1946, after having clandestinely published some titles using false imprints (such as L'aperitiu by Josep Maria de Sagarra, which claimed to have been printed in Perpignan before the Civil War), the publishing house launched the first post-war literary collection in Catalan: the Col·lecció Literària Aymà (1947–1950). The novel La Bogeria, by Narcís Oller, inaugurated this collection, which encompassed all genres (novels, short stories, theatre, and poetry) and included works by established and emerging Catalan authors. Primera història d'Esther (1948), by Salvador Espriu, was one of the early commercial successes.

Ediciones Aymà also promoted Catalan literature through the creation of the Joanot Martorell Prize. Established in 1947, it was the first writing competition organized under Francoism, and it lasted (with several interruptions) until 1960; Maria Aurèlia Capmany, Josep Pla, Josep Maria Espinàs, Manuel de Pedrolo, and Miquel Llor were some of the laureates. Another initiative by Aymà was the inception, in 1955, of the Club dels Novel·listes series; in 1959, the writers Joan Sales and Xavier Benguerel acquired this collection and transformed it into the core of Club Editor, a new publishing house that contributed to the development and dissemination of contemporary Catalan novel.
