= Associació d'Escriptors en Llengua Catalana =

The Associació d'Escriptors en Llengua Catalana (Catalan pronunciation: [əsusi.əsiˈo ðəskɾipˈtoz əɲ ˈʎeŋɡwə kətəˈlanə], "Association of Writers in the Catalan Language", or "Association of Catalan-Language Writers"), also known by the acronym AELC, is a professional organisation of authors, poets, scriptwriters, translators and other writers in the Catalan language. It is headquartered in Barcelona.

== History ==
The organisation was formerly instituted on 31 October 1977, following a 1975 resolution at a congress of Catalan culture to form a professional association of Catalan writers, with the participation of more than 100 writers from all of the Catalan-speaking territories, that is to say, Catalonia, the Valencian area, the Balearic Islands, and as well with the written participation of another 100 writers who could not personally attend the ceremony. From 1977 to 1988, the AELC developed the representative functions of the literary vitality of the Catalan countries with the desire to articulate a program that would be an instrument of dialogue and relation with the new political powers that constituted what was known as the Spanish democratic transition. One of the primary objectives was to re-vitalize the idea of the Institute of Catalan Letters, an institution that had been active during the 1930s until the end of the Spanish Civil War. The AELC proposed the creation of an infrastructure that recognized the aspirations of its associates and defended their interests. In 1988 the autonomous government of the Generalitat of Catalonia decreed to finally restore the ILC. Since then the AELC has centered its activities primarily on aspects of the writer's union and its claims, while leaving questions of representation to the ILC.

== Activities ==
The AELC divides its activities into two large blocks that revolve around two axes: professional activity and cultural activity, and it has three basic axes of operation:

- To protect the professional, cultural, and intellectual interests of writers.

In this context, we'd like to emphasize the important work realized by the AELC since 1988, the year in which the Generalitat of Catalonia made the Institute of Catalan Letters (ILC) a functioning entity. During this period (1977–1991, with the writer Guillem-Jordi Graells as Secretary) important judicial activity took place. Above all, the AELC participated in the elaboration of the Law of Intellectual Property. The AELC actively intervened in the administration of the Value Added Tax (VAT) and generally, in all that related to the fiscal concerns of the writer. We must not forget that up until that time the act of writing was not considered a professional activity but rather an exclusively vocational one. This intervention meant that one year later a landmark agreement was reached with the federation of publishers, in respect to both authors' as well as translators' contracts. In 1991 screenwriters' contracts were negotiated and established, with the agreement of Televisió de Catalunya (TVC). With these instruments, writers have become professionals of cultural production in Catalonia.

- To Promote Catalan literature in national and international society, and to help in the professional, technical, and cultural development of its members.

In this context, one of the most popular initiatives has been the Meetings of Writers which, like the AELC, has joined together authors from all corners of the Catalan linguistic realm; specifically from the three autonomous regions within the Spanish state: the Valencian country, the Balearic Islands, and Catalonia. The AELC is the only cultural association whose scope includes the entire linguistic territory. This fact is a reflection of a complex political situation derived from the fact that each autonomous community has its own government with its own distinct politics and manner of acting.

- To represent Catalan writers in a collective manner before public, private, community, state, national and international institutions.

As of 2015 the AELC president is Bel Olid. Past AELC presidents include: Josep M. Castellet, Josep M. Llompart, Joan Fuster, Avel·lí Artís-Gener, Jaume Fuster, Antònia Vicens, and Jaume Pérez Montaner and Guillem-Jordi Graells.

== See also ==
- Jordi Peñarroja
