= Avui =

Catalan daily newspaper

AVUI
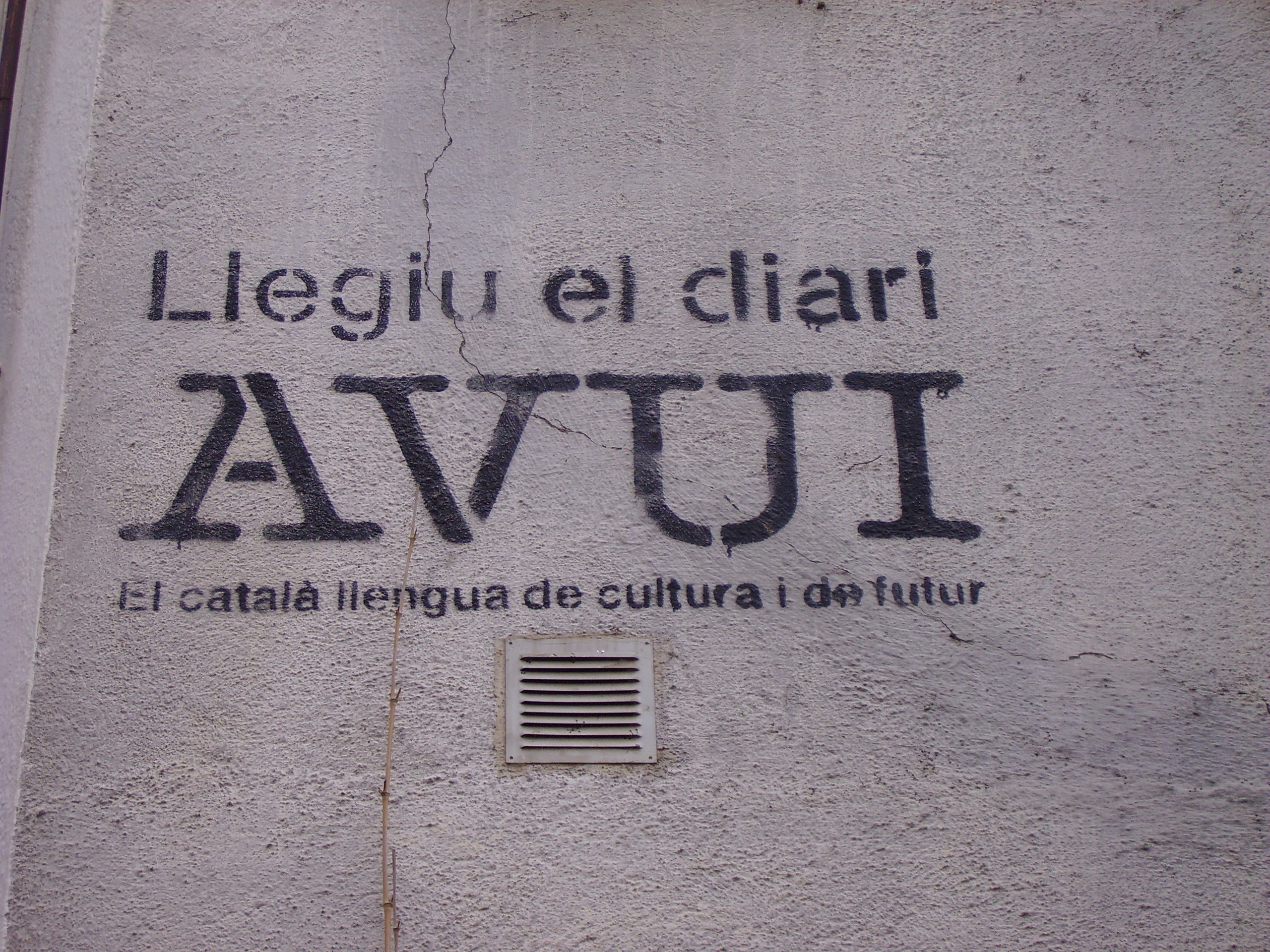
- Former logo
- Type: Daily newspaper
- Format: 39x29cm
- Owner: Hermes Comunicacions (publisher of El Punt)
- Founded: 23 April 1976
- Ceased publication: 31 July 2011
- Political alignment: Catalan nationalism; Catalan independentism; centrism
- Language: Catalan
- Headquarters: Enric Granados 84, Barcelona
- Circulation: 41,216 (OJD, June 2005)
- Website: www.elpuntavui.cat

Avui (Catalan pronunciation: [əˈβuj]; transl. "Today") was a Catalan-language daily newspaper, based in Barcelona, Catalonia. It was one of the city's newest papers, having been founded in 1976. The editorial line was Catalan nationalist.

== History and profile ==
Avui was first published on 23 April 1976, (Saint George's day, a symbolic holiday in Catalonia). The founding company was Premsa Catalana. The paper initially relied on the subscriptions of thousands of Catalans for financial support. It soon went into financial problems and changed ownership. A partnership of two publishers along with the Catalan national government itself took over in order to avoid imminent bankruptcy. The Grupo Godó owned 40% of the paper, which had its headquarters in Barcelona.

The Catalan government subsidises with important amounts those Catalan newspapers with at least one Catalan language edition. In 2008 Avui was only second to El Punt in terms of circulation/funds granted, having received almost €1.5 million that amounted to 48.9 euros per newspaper sold.

Then it went to change hands again in 2009, being bought by its rival El Punt, and creating the new newspaper El Punt Avui on 31 July 2011.
