= Eva Piquer =

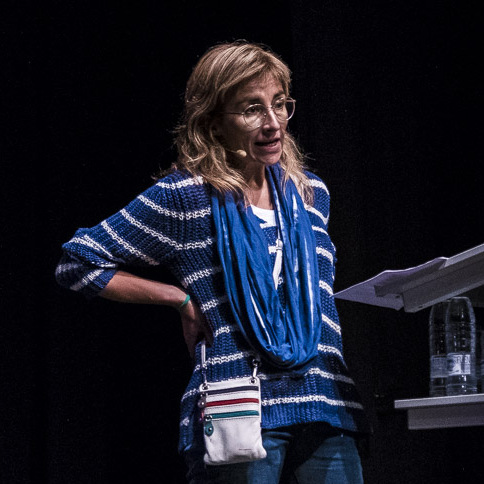
- Born: May 30, 1969 (age 57); Barcelona

Eva Piquer i Vinent (born in Barcelona on May 30, 1969) is a Catalan writer and journalist. She is the director and editor-in-chief of the cultural magazine Catorze.

== Biography ==
=== Career in journalism and teaching ===
Piquer worked as a correspondent in New York City (1992–1994) and taught journalism at the Autonomous University of Barcelona (1994–2001). She received the Atlàntida award in 2006 for best columnist in the Catalan language. She was the deputy head of culture and coordinator of the cultural supplement of Avui newspaper, where she worked from 1988 to 2010. She wrote articles on culture, politics and society for the newspaper Ara. She has also written in La Vanguardia, El Periódico, Time Out Barcelona, Nació Digital, Catalan International View, ONGC and others. From 1992 to 2022, she collaborated with Catalunya Ràdio. In 2014 she created the cultural digital publication Catorze, which was awarded the 15th LletrA Award for digital projects in 2015 and the National Prize for Culture, considered one of the most important distinctions in the field of culture in Catalonia, in 2018.

=== Career in publishing ===
As literary director of the publishing house Thassalia (1995–1997), she published books by Kate Atkinson, Daniel Pennac, Anita Brookner, Alexander Jardin, Barbara Trapido, Jerome Charyn, Rachel Cusk, Ann Beattie i Kingsley Amis, among others. She was part of the collective Germanes Quintana.

== Literary works ==
=== Individually ===
- 1996 — La noia del temps. El Vaixell de Vapor. Cruïlla, 1997.
- 1997 — Què pensa Mikimoto?
- 1999 — Alícia al país de la televisió
- 2002 — Una victòria diferent
- 2003 — No sóc obsessiva, no sóc obsessiva, no sóc obsessiva: Dèries, plaers i addiccions d'una lectora desacomplexada
- 2004 — Els fantasmes no saben nedar
- 2005 — Supermare treballadora i altres estafes
- 2010 — La feina o la vida. Certeses (provisionals) d'una mare desacomplexada
- 2012 — Petita història de Barcelona
- 2014 — Catorze de cara al 2014
- 2014 — Marta Rovira, cada dia més a prop
- 2018 — Evasions. Illustrated by Eva Armisén.
- 2021 – Com abans de tot. Illustrated by Eva Armisén.
- 2023 – Aterratge

=== Collectively ===
- 1998 — Zel
- 2000 — Por
- 2001 — Domèstics i salvatges
- 2003 — Tancat per vacances (with Sebastià Alzamora, Lluís Calvo, Miquel de Palol i Muntanyola, Gemma Lienas, Andreu Martín, Isabel Olesti, Maria Mercè Roca, Care Santos and Lluís Maria Todó)

== Awards and recognitions ==
- 1996 Vaixell de vapor for La noia del temps.
- 1999 Ciutat d'Olot-Marià Vayreda for Alícia al país de la televisió.
- 2002 Josep Pla for Una victòria diferent.
- 2006 Atlàntida award for the best columnist in the Catalan language.
