= Catalonia Yes =

Catalonia Yes Catalunya Sí
- Leader: Alfred Bosch
- Founded: 6 October 2011
- Dissolved: c. 2021
- Ideology: Catalan independence
- Regional affiliation: Republican Left of Catalonia–Catalonia Yes (2011–c. 2020)

Website
- www.catalunyasi.cat

Catalonia Yes (Catalan: Catalunya Sí, CatSí) was a Catalan independence political platform founded in 2011 bringing together people from civil society and various public figures in favour of independence for Catalonia.

In order to be able to run in coalition with other political parties, it was registered as a political party on 6 October 2011, later to contest jointly with Republican Left of Catalonia (ERC) and Independence Rally (RI) in the 2011 Spanish general election as part of Republican Left of Catalonia–Catalonia Yes.

== History ==
Following the internal renewal within ERC in 2010, primary elections were held shortly after to select the candidate for the 2011 general elections; the winner was the independent Alfred Bosch (with 65.81% of the vote), who beat the party's then secretary general, Joan Ridao (30.66%). After being named the candidate, Bosch engaged with Reagrupament and Solidaritat to create a joint independentist candidacy for the general elections. On 4 October 2011, Oriol Junqueras stated that Esquerra's proposal was to integrate members of Solidaritat, Reagrupament and independents into its lists via an electoral platform, with the legal form of a coalition, such that the republican party would predominate in the candidacy. The proposal was accepted by Reagrupament and rejected by Solidaritat, which lamented in a statement that "Oriol Junqueras should decide to turn down the electoral coalition with Solidaritat" and that "ERC represents itself with its acronym and its programme alone, which does not prioritise the battle for independence in Catalonia".

On October 8, 2011, Oriol Junqueras and Joan Carretero, the presidents of Esquerra and Reagrupament respectively, as well as Alfred Bosch, held a press conference in the Barcelona Athenaeum to announce the formation of an electoral coalition named Republican Left of Catalonia-Catalonia Yes (Esquerra Republicana de Catalunya-Catalunya Sí), aimed at achieving Catalan independence and the preservation of the Catalan welfare state. The coalition agreement also left space on its lists for independents with connections to the Catalonia Yes citizens' platform, such as Miquel Sellarès, Gorka Knörr and Josep Cruanyes, among others. On October 11, 2011, the coalition announced that another independent from the platform, centenarian surgeon Moisès Broggi, would lead the list for Barcelona for the Senate.

During the electoral campaign, its motto was República del sí (Republic of Yes).

The platform put forward lists in the four electoral subdivisions in Catalonia, obtaining 256,393 votes (1.05% nationally, 7.06% of the total in Catalonia) for the Congress of Deputies, seeing three of its candidates elected, two for Barcelona (Alfred Bosch and Joan Tardà) and one for Girona (Teresa Jordà), thus becoming part of the mixed group of the lower chamber; this was the same number of seats obtained by ERC alone in 2008. However, in the Senate, where it ran solo, despite having won seats for three senators in the previous elections as part of Catalan Agreement of Progress, the coalition won no seats.

In 2012, in preparation for the regional elections, ERC called a meeting with Solidaritat, Reagrupament, the CUP (which did not attend) and Democràcia Catalana to negotiate an electoral coalition. However, the four forces present could not reach an agreement for a joint candidacy, leading Solidaritat to announce a solo candidacy; Reagrupament and Democràcia Catalana declined to run, with the former endorsing CiU and the latter calling for votes for either CiU or ERC. ERC announced that it would revive the ERC-Catalunya Sí Coalition, to which Catalonia Yes would bring jurist Gemma Calvet (4th for Barcelona), journalist Eva Piquer (7th for Barcelona), writer Jordi Llavina (25th for Barcelona) and philosopher Josep Maria Terricabras closing the list for Tarragona.

In the European Parliament elections of 2014, Catalonia Yes gave its support to ERC and The Left for the Right to Decide coalition, led by Catalonia Yes member Josep Maria Terricabras.

In the 2015 municipal elections, the ERC list for Barcelona led by Alfred Bosch included Catalonia Yes member and actor Juanjo Puigcorbé in second place and lawyer Santiago Vidal in last place.

== Related people ==
Alongside the aforementioned writer Alfred Bosch, doctor Moisès Broggi, journalist Eva Piquer, writer Jordi Llavina, philosopher Josep Maria Terricabras, politician Miquel Sellarès, singer Gorka Knörr and lawyer Josep Cruanyes, the platform's collaborators include singer-songwriter Lluís Llach, actor Anna Sahun, Sopa de Cabra singer Gerard Quintana, politician and philologist Jordi Carbonell, director Ventura Pons, actor Toni Albà, journalist and writer Miquel Giménez, and theatre critic Àlex Gorina.
