= Olvido García Valdés =

Spanish poet & essayist (born 1950)

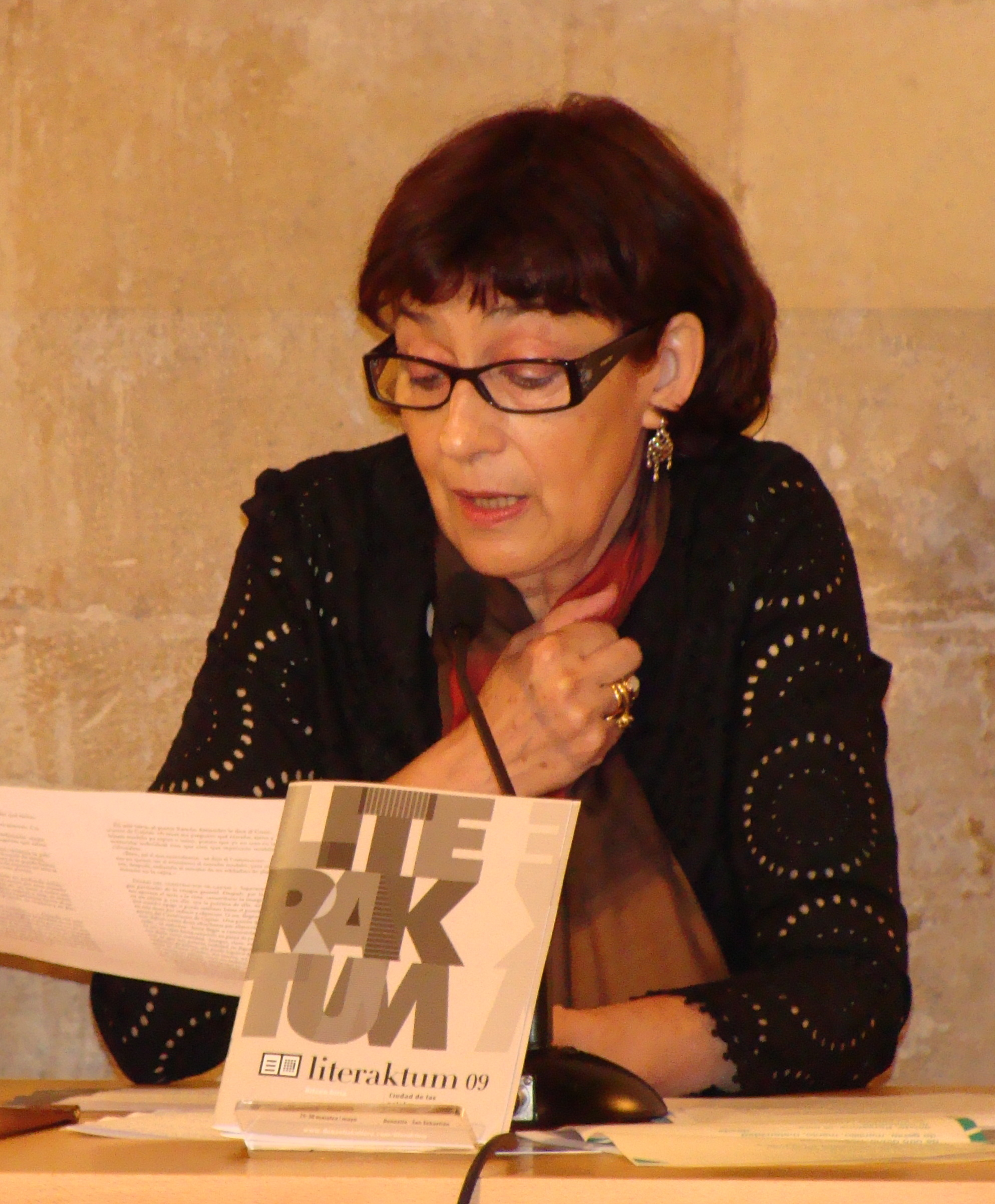
- Olvido García Valdés (2009)
- Born: 2 December 1950 (age 75); Santianes de Pravia, Asturias, Spain
- Occupation: Poet
- Writing career
- Notable works: Caza nocturna, Y todos estábamos vivos

Olvido García Valdés (born 2 December 1950) is a Spanish poet, essayist, translator, and professor. She is married to the poet Miguel Casado.

== Life and work ==
García Valdés holds degrees in Philosophy from the University of Oviedo, and Romance Philology from the University of Valladolid. She is currently a professor of Literature and of Spanish in the Instituto El Greco of Toledo, Spain, and at Sant Em de Sant Feliu de Guíxols. In 2007 she was awarded the National Poetry Prize for her verse collection "Y todos estábamos vivos" (And we were all alive". In 2008 she retired from her post as the director of the Cervantes Institute in Toulouse, France. A frequent collaborator with the Revista de Occidente and Ínsula, among others, she is also co-director of the poetry review Los Infolios, and is a member of the editorial board for El signo de gorrión, which she co-founded. Her work appears in various anthologies of Spanish literature: La prueba del nueve (1994), Ellas tienen la palabra (1997), El último tercio del siglo (1968–1998), Antología consultada de la poesía española, Madrid, Visor, 1998. Her poems have been translated into French, English, German, Swedish and Portuguese.

The author describes her work as divided into three stages. The first includes her first three verse collections: El tercer jardín (1986); Exposición (Icarus Prize for Literature, 1990); and Ella, los pájaros (Leonor Prize, 1994). One book, Caza nocturna (1997), comprises the second stage, and the third includes her two most recent: Del ojo al hueso (2001) and Y todos estábamos vivos (2006), two books marked by a profound awareness of death. Her style is characterized by juxtapositions of fractured verbal asceticism with the sustained lyrical line, quotidian commentary and existential reflections.

== Literary works ==
=== Poetry ===
- El tercer jardín, Valladolid: Editorial del Faro, 1986.
- Exposición, Ferrol, 1990, premio Ícaro de Literatura.
- Ella, los pájaros, Soria: Diputación, 1994, premio Leonor de Poesía.
- Mimosa de febrero (1994).
- Caza nocturna, Madrid: Ave del Paraíso, 1997
- Si un cuervo trajera (2000).
- Del ojo al hueso, Madrid: Ave del Paraíso, 2001.
- La poesía, ese cuerpo extraño, Madrid, 2005.
- Y todos estábamos vivos, Barcelona: Tusquets, 2006, National Poetry Prize
- Esa polilla que delante de mí revolotea, Galazía Gutenberg: Círculo de Lextores, 2008
- "Lo solo del animal", Tusquets 2012

=== Prose ===
- Los poetas de la República (with Miguel Casado), Barcelona, 1997.
- Teresa de Jesús, Barcelona, 2001.

=== Translations ===
- Pier Paolo Pasolini, La religión de mi tiempo (1997).
- Anna Akhmatova and Marina Tsvetáieva, El canto y la ceniza. Antología poética (2005) (with Monika Zgustova)

=== Art criticism ===
- Vincent: la sombra debida (2005). Catalogue of an exhibit of Luis Costillo.
- Agrafismos (Ondulaciónes) (2008). Catalogue of an exhibit of José-Miguel Ullán.

== Awards ==
- 1989 - Premio Esquío de Poesía en Lengua Castellana.
- 1990 - Premio Icaro de Literatura.
- 1993 - Premio Leonor de Poesía.
- 2007 - Premio Nacional de Poesía for her book Y todos estábamos vivos.
