= Saladrigas =

Saladrigas is a surname. Notable people with the surname include:

- Carlos Saladrigas Zayas (1900–1956), Cuban politician and diplomat
- Robert Saladrigas (1940–2018), Spanish writer, journalist and literary critic
