= Silent Woman =

Silent Woman may refer to:

- Silent Woman (pub name), a popular name for pubs
- The Silent Woman (film), a 1918 American silent drama film
- Epicœne, or The Silent Woman, a comedy by Renaissance playwright Ben Jonson
  - The Silent Woman, or Die schweigsame Frau, a 1935 comic opera adaptation by Richard Strauss
- Silent Woman, a 1994 biography of Sylvia Plath and Ted Hughes by Janet Malcolm
- The Silent Woman, a 2005 novel by Monika Zgustová
