= Cèlia Sànchez-Mústich =

Spanish poet and writer

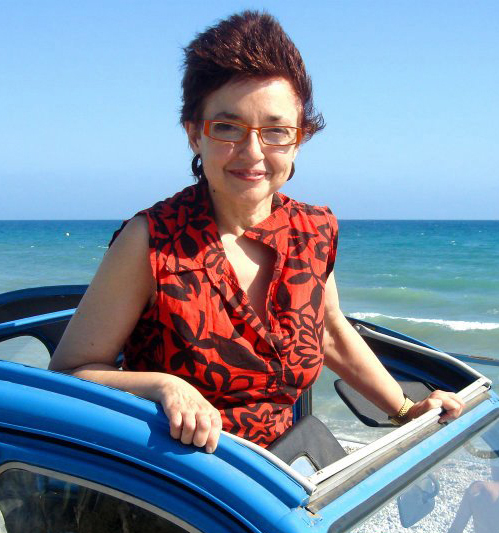
- Born: 9 December 1954 (age 71); Barcelona
- Occupations: Poet, Writer
- Writing career
- Genres: poetry, novel, short stories
- Website: www.escriptors.cat/autors/sanchezmustichc

Cèlia Sànchez-Mústich (born 9 December 1954) is a Spanish poet and writer in the Catalan language. She has lived in Sitges since 2001.

== Biography ==
Cèlia Sànchez-Mústich undertook musical studies (piano, guitar, harmony) at the Arts of the Rhythm School and at the Liceu Conservatory in Barcelona. Her work includes several titles of poetry, novels, brief narrative and non-fiction narrative, seven of which have received awards such as the Mercè Rodoreda of narrative, Miquel de Palol, Serra d'Or or Premi Octubre of poetry. Part of her poems have been translated to Galician, Basque, Spanish, French, Occitan, Italian and English, and form part of several anthologies (Parlano le donne, poetesse catalane of the XXI secolo, 48 poètes Catalan pour le XXI siècle, La Traductière or the most recent Paraula encesa, by Jordi Julià and Pere Ballart, between other) and audiovisual (audiovisual File of poets of the ACEC, etc.).

She has read her poems in several places of the Catalan Countries, often in collaboration with other poets and musicians. A short film, Radio-Taxi (2012) directed by Jordi Bueno was based on one of her short stories. Also as a cultural activist, she has promoted several projects about poetry such as the poetical and musical meetings in Lailo, during five years, and the Festa de la poesia a Sitges she directs along with the poet and biochemist Joan Duran i Ferrer since 2007.

She has been included with Pere Gimferrer, Maria Mercè Marçal and Jaume Pont as part of an anthology of four poets included in a study devoted to Catalan literature in number 1007 (May, 2013) of the French literary magazine Europe. Since then, she began to receive some attention from France such as the joint offer of Editions du Noroît (Quebec), and Myriam Solal (Paris), to publish the French version of her book On no sabem, or the invitation to take part in the Voix de la Méditerranée 2014 festival in Lodève. In autumn 2013, Myriam Solal and Editions du Noroît finally reached an agreement to publish On no sabem as Cet espace entre nous, translated by the poet and translator François-Michel Durazzo. The presentation took place on 5 June 2014 at the Maison de l'Amérique latine in Paris.

== Work ==
=== Poetry ===
- La cendra i el miracle. Barcelona: Columna, 1989
- El lleu respir. Barcelona: Columna, 1991
- Temperatura humana. Barcelona: Columna, 1994
- Taques. Barcelona: Edicions 62, 1997
- Llum de claraboia. Lleida: Pagès, 2004
- A la taula del mig. Palma de Mallorca: Moll, 2009
- On no sabem. València: Tresiquatre, 2010
- A l'hotel, a deshora. Girona: Curbet Edicions, 2014
- La gota negra. Lleida: Pagès, 2018

=== Novel ===
- Les cambres del desig. Barcelona: Columna, 1999
- Tercer acte d'amor. Barcelona: Proa, 2002

=== Short stories and essay ===
- Diagnòstic: lluna nova. Barcelona: ICD, 1993
- Pati de butaques. Barcelona: Columna, 1996
- El tacte de l'ametlla. Barcelona: Proa, 2000
- Peret, l'ànima d'un poble. Barcelona: Edicions 62, 2005
- Il·lusionistes del futbol. Valls: Cossetània, 2007
- No. I sí. Lleida: Pagès, 2009
- Ara et diré què em passa amb les dones i tretze contes més. Barcelona: Editorial Moll, 2013.
- Els vells, aquella nosa. Barcelona: Comanegra, 2020.

=== Translated works ===
- Peret, el alma d'un pueblo to Spanish. Península, 2005.
- Le Jour J anthology in French, dins Nouvelles de Catalogne. Magellan & Cie,
- Cet espace entre nous French version of On no sabem. Myriam Solal, Paris, and Editions du Noroît, Quebec, 2014.

== Awards ==
- Rosa Leveroni (1990): El lleu respir
- Don-na (1992): Diagnòstic: lluna nova
- Premi Miquel de Palol de poesia (1996): Taques
- Mercè Rodoreda Award, de la Nit literària de Santa Llúcia (1999): El tacte de l'ametlla
- 7LLETRES (2008): NO. I SÍ
- Premi Crítica Serra d'Or de Literatura i Assaig|Premi Crítica Serra d'Or de poesia 2010 A la taula del mig
- Ploma d'Or de l'Ajuntament de Sitges (2010)
- Premi Octubre Vicent Andrés Estellés de poesia 2010 On no sabem
