= Mercè Rodoreda Award =

Catalan literary award

The Mercè Rodoreda Award for stories and narrations, officially and in Catalan Premi Mercè Rodoreda is a literary award in the Catalan language convened by Òmnium Cultural and the Fundació Enciclopèdia Catalana and published by Edicions Proa. Initially called the Víctor Català Award (named after Victor Català), which was awarded for the first time in 1953, in 1998 it changed its name to become the current Mercè Rodoreda Award (named after Mercè Rodoreda) for stories and narratives.

Works of original and unpublished stories or narratives, written in Catalan, are eligible for the prize. Its delivery takes place during the Literary Night of Santa Llúcia during the month of December. The prize has an endowment of 6,000 euros.

== Winners ==
=== Premi Víctor Català ===
- 1953 – Jordi Sarsanedas, for Mites
- 1954 – Pere Calders, for Cròniques de la veritat oculta
- 1955 – Lluís Ferran de Pol, for La ciutat i el tròpic
- 1956 – Manuel de Pedrolo, for Crèdits humans
- 1957 – Mercè Rodoreda, for Vint-i-dos contes
- 1958 – Josep Maria Espinàs, for Varietés
- 1959 – Josep A. Baixeras, for Perquè no
- 1960 – Ramon Folch i Camarasa, for Sala d'espera
- 1961 – Estanislau Torres, for La Xera
- 1962 – Jordi Maluquer, for Pol·len
- 1963 – Carles Macià, for La nostra terra de cada dia
- 1964 – Joaquim Carbó, for Solucions provisionals
- 1965 – Víctor Mora Pujadas, for El cafè dels homes tristos
- 1966 – Guillem Viladot, for La gent i el vent
- 1967 – Terenci Moix, for La torre dels vicis capitals
- 1968 – Jaume Vidal Alcover, for Les quatre llunes
- 1969 – Robert Saladrigas, for Boires
- 1970 – Montserrat Roig, for Molta roba i poc sabó
- 1971 – Gabriel Janer Manila, for El cementiri de les roses
- 1972 – Josep Albanell, for Les parets de l'insomni
- 1973 – Jaume Cabré, for Atrafegada calor
- 1974 – Beatriu Civera, for Vides alienes
- 1975 – Xavier Romeu, for La mort en punt
- 1976 – Antoni Mus, for Vida i miracles de n'Aineta dels matalassos
- 1977 – Joan Rendé, for Sumari d'homicida
- 1978 – Isabel-Clara Simó, for És quan miro que hi veig clar
- 1979 – Joan Casas, for Pols de terrat
- 1980 – Margarida Aritzeta, for Quan la pedra es torna fang a les mans
- 1981 – Francesc Sales, for Les alveolars a la Romània
- 1982 – Llorenç Sant Marc, for Quaranta històries
- 1983 – Pau Faner, for Lady Valentine
- 1984 – Llorenç Capellà, for Una cinta de dol al capell
- 1985 – Maria Mercè Roca, for Sort que hi ha l'horitzó
- 1986 – Jordi Condal, for Els germans Pinçons
- 1987 – Jordi Jané i Romeu, for Microcosmos
- 1988 – Carme Guasch, for Situacions insulars
- 1989 – Magí Sunyer, for La serp
- 1990 – Rafa Gomar, for Legítima defensa
- 1991 – Joaquim Soler, for A una sola veu
- 1992 – Skipped edition
- 1993 – Skipped edition
- 1994 – Skipped edition
- 1995 – Skipped edition
- 1996 – Skipped edition
- 1997 – Miquel de Palol, for Contes per a vells adolescents

=== Premi Mercè Rodoreda ===
- 1998 – Albert Roca, for Galeries subterrànies
- 1999 – Cèlia Sànchez-Mústich, for El tacte de l'ametlla
- 2000 – Xavier Gual, for Delirium tremens
- 2001 – Àngel Burgas, for Adéu
- 2002 – Lluís Muntada i Vendrell, for Canvi d'agulles
- 2003 – Joan Rendé, for Una pedra a la sabata
- 2004 – Vicenç Pagès Jordà, for El poeta i altres contes
- 2005 – Joan Esculies Serrat, for Tràilers
- 2006 – Borja Bagunyà, for Defensa pròpia
- 2007 – Guillem Frontera, for La mort i la pluja
- 2008 – Víctor Alexandre, for Set dones i un home sol
- 2009 – Monika Zgustová, for Contes de la lluna absent
- 2010 – Alba Dedeu, for Gats al parc
- 2011 – Ramon Erra, for La vida per rail
- 2012 – Tina Vallès, for El parèntesi més llarg
- 2013 – Neus Canyelles, for Mai no sé què faré fora de casa
- 2014 – Maria Mercè Cuartiella, for Gent que tu coneixes
- 2015 – Empar Moliner, for Tot això ho faig perquè tinc molta por
- 2016 – Jenn Díaz, for Vida familiar
- 2017 – Clara Queraltó, for El que pensen els altres
- 2018 – Víctor Garcia Tur, for El país dels cecs
- 2019 – Carlota Gurt, for Cavalcarem tota la nit
- 2020 – Anna Gas, for El pèndol
- 2021 – Ricard Sunyol, for Declaració d'invencions
- 2022 – Marc Vintró Castells, for Unes ganes salvatges de cridar
- 2023 – Carme Serna Far, per Perdona'm per desitjar-ho tant
