= Empar Moliner =

Spanish writer and journalist

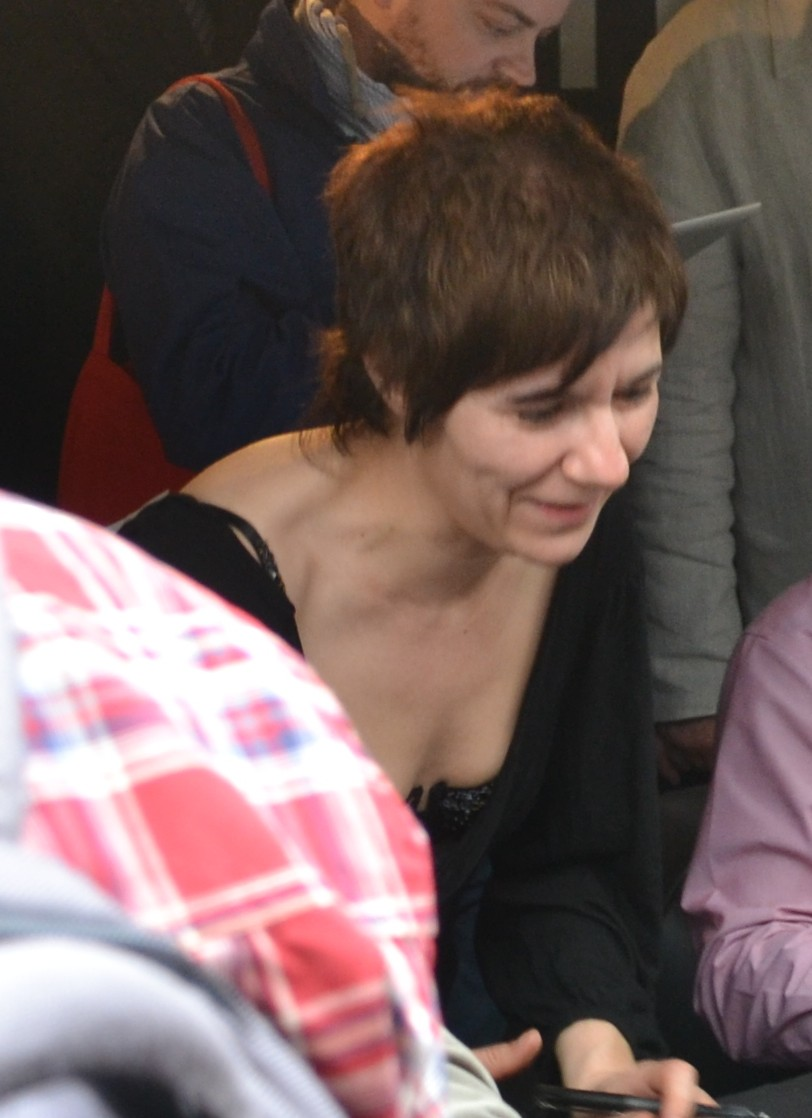
Empar Moliner (2012).

Empar Moliner Ballesteros (Catalan pronunciation: [əmˈpaɾ muliˈne]; Santa Eulàlia de Ronçana, Barcelona, 1966) is a Catalan writer and journalist. She works for the newspapers El País, Avui, and appears in several TV and radio programs as Minoria Absoluta (RAC 1), El matí de Catalunya Ràdio and Els matins (TV3). In 2000, she received the Josep Pla Award.

== Published books ==
- L'Ensenyador de pisos que odiava els mims. ISBN 84-233-3114-8
- Feli, esthéticienne. (Josep Pla Prize 2000) ISBN 84-233-3202-0
- T'estimo si he begut. (Lletra d'Or Prize 2005) ISBN 84-7727-410-X
- Busco senyor per amistat i el que sorgeixi. ISBN 84-7727-428-2
- Desitja guardar els canvis? ISBN 84-7727-444-4
