= Borja Bagunyà =

Catalan writer and university professor

- Born: 1982 (age 43–44); Barcelona
- Occupations: Writer, university professor

Borja Bagunyà Costes (born 1982, Barcelona) is a Catalan writer and university professor.

== Biography ==
He has a degree in literary theory and comparative literature from the University of Barcelona, where he is an associate professor. He is also co-founder of the Escola Bloom (Bloom literature School) with Lana Bastasic and editor of the literary magazine Carn de cap.

He wrote his first book of short stories at the age of 19 – published in 2004, Apunts per al retrat d'una ciutat — 2 and in 2007 won the Mercè Rodoreda Award for short stories for Defensa pròpia. In 2011 he published Plantes d'Interior (Empúries) and in 2021 Els angles morts (Periscopi). Winner of the Critics' Award 2022 in the category of Catalan narrative, it has been translated into Spanish by Rubén Martín Giráldez with the title Los Puntos Ciegos.

== Works ==
- Apunts per al retrat d'una ciutat (Tarragona: Arola Editors, 2004).
- Defensa pròpia (Barcelona: Edicions Proa, 2007 – Premi Mercè Rodoreda 2007)
- Plantes d'interior (Barcelona: Editorial Empúries, 2011).
- Trapologia, with Max Besora (Ara llibres, 2018)
- Els angles morts (Edicions del Periscopi, 2021)
- Sessió de control / Una casa i un flagell (Comanegra, 2023)
- Breu història del mandat (Fragmenta, 2023)
