= Ediciones Destino =

Spanish publishing house

- Parent company: Planeta Group
- Founded: 1942; 83 years ago
- Founders: Josep Vergés i Matas; Joan Teixidor i Comes; Ignasi Agustí i Peypoch
- Country of origin: Spain
- Headquarters location: Barcelona
- Publication types: Books
- Official website: http://www.edestino.es/

Ediciones Destino is a Spanish publishing house, founded by the editors of the weekly Destino in the 1942.

Destino's catalogue includes the most emblematic Spanish authors of the post-war period such as Miguel Delibes, Camilo José Cela, Carmen Martín Gaite, Rafael Sánchez Ferlosio, Ana María Matute, Carmen Laforet, etc. and great foreign authors such as George Orwell, Bohumil Hrabal or Naguib Mahfuz. Recently it has been publishing authors such as Andrés Trapiello, Antonio Soler, Pedro Zarraluki or Eduardo Lago.

In Catalan, the highly illustrated "Image of Catalonia" collection, often by photographers as Francesc Català Roca, had a strong impact and collected important Catalan subjects by leading authors.

The publishing house awards two prizes a year for unpublished works, the Nadal Prize, founded in 1944 (the oldest award in Spanish literature), and the Josep Pla Prize, founded in 1968, for unpublished works in Catalan.

Planeta Group bought half of the publisher's shares in 1989, and the rest in 1996.

== Destino Infantil & Juvenil ==
Destino Infantil & Juvenil is a children's publishing label of Destino Publishing House, who publish books for young people since 2002. Under this label are published illustrated albums and children's and youth fiction, in Spanish and Catalan. Some of the bestsellers are The Lord of Thieves, by acclaimed German writer Cornelia Funke, the Chronicles of Narnia series, by C. S. Lewis, and books by Geronimo Stilton, among others.

In 1981, it established the Apel·les Mestres Award, that rewards illustrated international children's and youth literature.
