= Tina Vallès =

Catalan writer, proofreader and translator

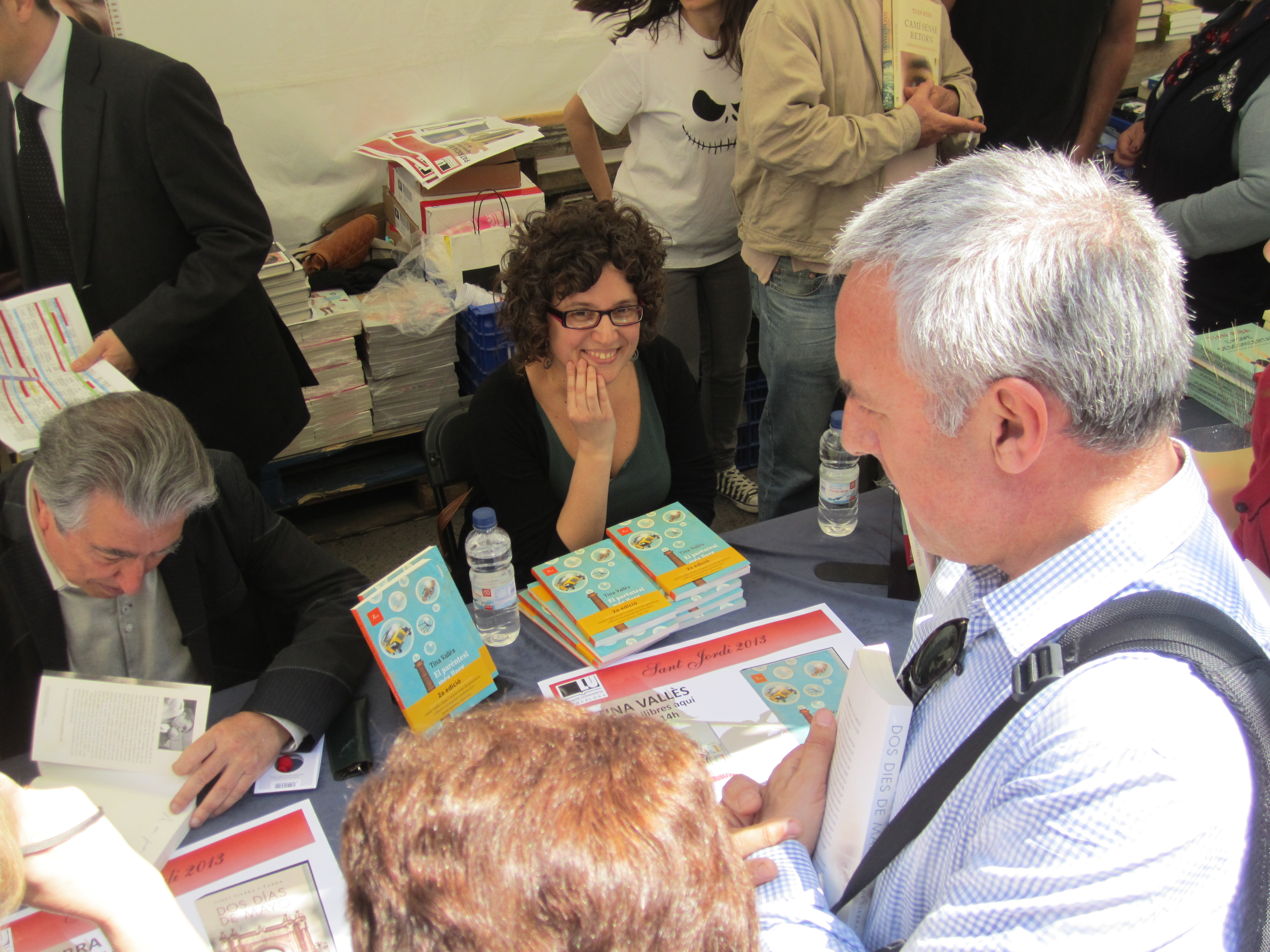
- Tina Vallès signing books in 2013
- Born: 1976 (age 49–50); Barcelona
- Occupations: writer, proofreader and translator
- Notable work: La memòria de l'arbre

Tina Vallès (born 1976 in Barcelona) is a Catalan writer, proofreader and translator.

She graduated in Catalan Philology at the University of Barcelona in 1999. Since then she has worked as a proofreader for several publishing houses in Catalonia, and has translated several works from Spanish to Catalan. She has also written several books of fiction, including El parèntesi més llarg (The Longest Parenthesis), for which she won the Mercè Rodoreda Award.

She has been the co-editor of the literary magazine Paper de Vidre since 2006 and was a founding member of the Professional Association of Translators and Interpreters of Catalonia. In 2017 she won the Anagrama Prize for novels with La memòria de l'arbre (The Memory of the Tree), a book that has been translated into 19 languages: Spanish, Italian, French, Portuguese, Galician, Turkish, Arabic, German, Polish, Lithuanian, Brazilian, Slovenian, Russian and Czech.

== Works ==
- L'aeroplà del Raval. Barcelona: LaBreu (2006)
- El caganer més divertit de Nadal en 3D. Barcelona: Estrella Polar (2011)
- Petita història: Palau Güell. Barcelona: Mediterrània (2011)
- Maic. Barcelona: Baula (2011)
- Un altre got d'absenta. Barcelona: LaBreu (2012)
- El parèntesi més llarg. Barcelona: Proa (2013)
- La cigala i la formiga. Barcelona: Estrella Polar (2016)
- La llebre i la tortuga. Barcelona: Estrella Polar (2016)
- Bocabava. Il·lustracions de Gabriel Salvadó. Barcelona: Fragmenta (2016) ISBN 978-84-15518-39-6.
- Totes les pors. Barcelona: La Galera (2016)
- La marieta sense taques. Barcelona: Bambú (2017)
- La memòria de l'arbre. Barcelona: Anagrama (2017)
- Crec. Amb il·lustracions d'Alicia Baladan. Barcelona: Kireei (2017)
- Erra. Barcelona: Comanegra (2018)
- Els pòstits del senyor Nohisoc. Illustrated by Christian Inaraja. La Galera (2021)
- El senyor Palomar a Barcelona. Barcelona: Anagrama (2021)
- Mira. Il·lustracions de Mercè Galí. Barcelona: Animallibres (2021)
- La primera ostra. Barcelona: Babulinka (2023)
- Sant Jordi de cap per avall. Barcelona: Comanegra (2024)
- Maic. Barcelona: Anagrama (2025)

== Awards ==
- Mercè Rodoreda Award for El parèntesi més llarg (2012)
- Anagrama award for La memòria de l'arbre (2017)
- Maria Àngels Anglada Prize for La memòria de l'arbre (2018)
- Prix Jean Monnet des Jeunes Européens for the French version of La memòria de l'arbre, translated by Juliette Lemerle. Philippe Rey Editors (2020)
- Folch i Torres award for Els pòstits del senyor Nohisoc (2020)
