= Jaume Clotet =

Catalan historian and journalist

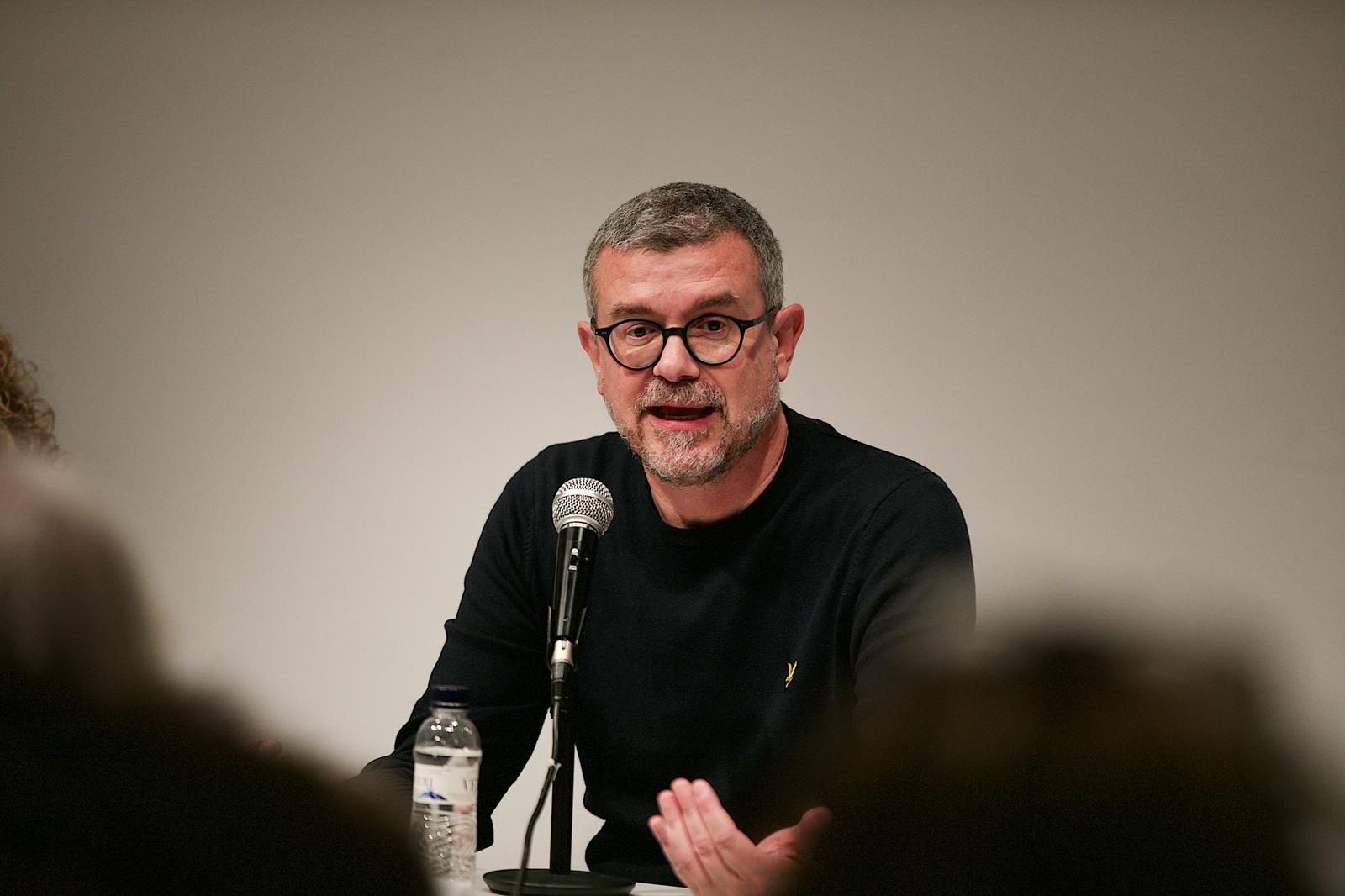
- Born: Jaume Clotet i Planas; 1974 (age 51–52); Barcelona
- Occupations: writer, journalist, historian
- Known for: Winner of Josep Pla Award 2024

Jaume Clotet i Planas (Barcelona, 16 May 1974) is a Catalan journalist, historian and writer.

Graduated in Journalism at the Autonomous University of Barcelona and in History at the University of Barcelona, he was head of the politics section of the Catalan newspaper Avui. He was a correspondent in Basque Country between 2001 and 2003 for Avui and Ona Catalana. Between 2003 and 2008 he was head of press at the Catalan Government and between 2008 and 2010 he held the position of deputy director of the Catalan News Agency. He is a founding member of the Ramon Barnils Group of Journalists and has collaborated in various media, such as Diari Ara, El Punt Avui, TV3, Público, Ona Catalana and RAC 1.

He is co-author, with Quim Torra, of Les millors obres de la literatura catalana (comentades pel censor) (A Contra Vent, 2010) and of the historical novel Lliures o morts (Columna, 2012), with the journalist David de Montserrat. In 2014 he published 50 moments imprescindibles de la història de Catalunya (Columna). He has also published some children's stories, like La meva primera Diada.

In 2014 he curated the Eugeni Xammar year for the Catalan Government. In 2016 he was appointed Director General of Communications of the Government of the Catalan Government for Carles Puigdemont's cabinet.

As a writer, he has won the Nèstor Luján Prize in 2016 and in 2024 the Josep Pla Award.

== Notable ==
- Les millors obres de la literatura catalana (comentades pel censor) (A Contravent, 2010) with Quim Torra.
- Lliures o morts (Columna, 2012) with David de Montserrat
- 50 moments imprescindibles de la història de Catalunya (Columna, 2015)
- El càtar proscrit (Columna, 2016)
- La Germandat de l'Àngel Caigut (2024)
- La calavera de l'apòstol (2025)
- L'espasa del rei (2026)
