= Gemma Lienas =

Spanish writer, feminist activist, and politician

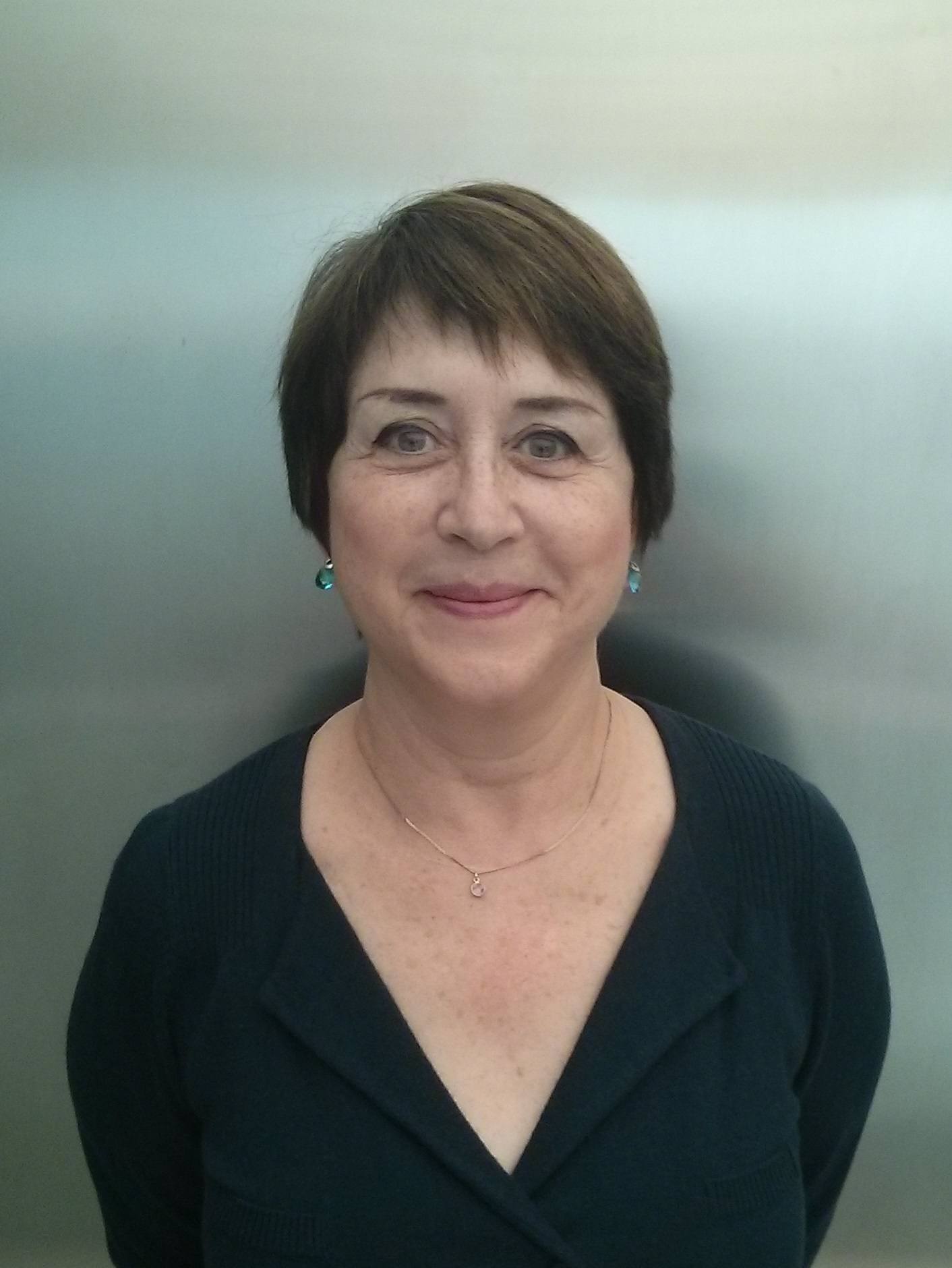
- Gemma Lienas i Massot
- Born: Gemma Lienas Massot; 16 January 1951 (age 75); Barcelona
- Education: Autonomous University of Barcelona
- Writing career
- Notable awards: Francesc Macia al Treball

Gemma Lienas Massot (born 16 January 1951) is a Spanish writer, feminist activist, and politician. In October 2015, she became one of Barcelona's deputies for Catalunya Sí que es Pot. She is a recipient of the medal Francesc Macia al Treball.

== Early life and education ==
Lienas was born in Barcelona. She earned a degree in Philosophy and Literature at the Autonomous University of Barcelona.

== Career ==
Lienas worked as a teacher and editor before she started writing. Her first work is "Cul de sac", a young adult novel published in 1986. She has written a series of books called “Carlota’s Diaries”, which mix fiction and nonfiction and explain to young people different subjects such as violence against women, feminism, sex and emotions, drugs and immigration and multiculturalism. She has also two series for children: "Emi & Max", where her characters live adventures in exotic places, and "Camelot’s Tribe", where a group of children solve all kind of mysteries.

Her novels aimed at adults include El final del Joc (Game over), Atrapada al mirall (Trapped in the mirror) and Una nit, un somni (Last night I dreamt of you). Each focuses on a psychological conflict.

Lienas has also published essays on various topics associated to the world of women, including Rebels, ni putes ni submises and Pornografia i vestits de núvia. Her books have been translated into several languages (German, Basque, Slovenian, Italian, Portuguese, Brazilian, Gallego and Serbo-Croat).

== Selected works ==
=== Novels ===
- Vol nocturn (catalán) - Ed. 3 i 4, 1988. ISBN 9788475023656, OCLC 433915387
- Anoche soñé contigo / Una nit, un somni (catalán) - Ed. El Aleph, 2010 (1ª Ed. 2001) / Ed. Labutxaca, 2010. ISBN 9788415325369, OCLC 921411825
- El final del joc (catalán) / El final del juego - Ed. Labutxaca, 2011 (1ª Ed. Planeta, 2003) / Ed. Quinteto, 2011 (1ª Ed. Planeta, 2003).
- Atrapada al mirall (catalán) / Atrapada en el espejo - Ed. Empúries / Ed. El Aleph, 2007. ISBN 9788497872560, OCLC 552374132

=== Non-fiction ===
- Vivir sin ellos, los hombres no son imprescindibles - Ed. Apóstrofe, 1996. ISBN 9788445501252, OCLC 431884209
- Rebels, ni putes ni submises (catalán) / Rebeldes, ni putas ni sumisas - Ed. Empúries, 2005 / Ed. Península, 2005.
- Quiero ser puta. Contra la regulación del comercio sexual / Vull ser puta. Contra la regularització de la prostitució - Ed. Península / Ed. Empúries, 2006.
- Pornografia i vestits de núvia (catalán) / Pornografía y vestidos de novia - Ed. Empúries / Ed. Península, 2007.
- Us espero a taula (catalán) - Ed. Columna, 2009.

=== Short stories ===
- El gust del café (catalán) - Ed. Pòrtic, 1989. ISBN 9788473063876, OCLC 494429825
- Mirada líquida dentro de Tancat per vacances (collective, with Sebastià Alzamora, Lluís Calvo, Miquel de Palol, Andreu Martín, Isabel Olesti, Eva Piquer, Maria Mercè Roca, Care Santos & Lluís Maria Todó) - Ed. Columna, 2003. OCLC 432038090
- La síndrome del conill blanc dentro de Condició de mare - Ed. Ara llibres, 2004.
- Barcelona, 1964 dentro de El llibre de la Marató de TV3. Vuit relats sobre les malalties mentals greus - Ed. Columna, 2008.
- Con papá y sin papá dentro de El viaje del Polizón - Ed. Mundos épicos, 2012.

=== Children's short stories ===
- Cul de sac (catalán) / Callejón sin salida - Ed. Estrella Polar, 2010 (1ª Ed. Empúries, 1986) / Ed. PlanetaLector, 2012 (1ª Ed. Ediciones SM, 1997).
- 2 CV (catalán) / Dos caballos - Ed. Estrella Polar, 2010 (1ª Ed. Empúries, 1987) / Ed. Planeta & Oxford, 2004.
- Bitllet d'anada i tornada (catalán) / Billete de ida y vuelta - Ed. Empúries / Ed. El Aleph, 1999.
- El diari lila de la Carlota(catalán) / El diario violeta de Carlota - Ed. Empúries, 2001 / Ed. El Aleph, 2009.
- El diari vermell de la Carlota (catalán) / El diario rojo de Carlota - Ed. Empúries / Ed. Destino, 2004.
- El diari blau de la Carlota (catalán) / El diario azul de Carlota - Ed. Empúries, 2006 / Ed. El Aleph, 2010.
- L'Emi i en Max. Les balenes desorientades (catalán) / Emi y Max. Las ballenas desorientadas - Ed. La Galera, 2007.
- L'Emi i en Max. La glacera verinosa (catalán) / Emi y Max. El glaciar venenoso - Ed. La Galera, 2007.
- L'Emi i en Max. El llac assassí (catalán) / Emi y Max. El lago asesino - Ed. La Galera, 2007.
- L'Emi i en Max. Els lemmings bojos (catalán) / Emi y Max. Los lemmings locos - Ed. La Galera, 2008.
- L'Emi i en Max. L'asteroide destructor (catalán) / Emi y Max. El asteroide destructor - Ed. La Galera, 2008.
- La tribu de Camelot. Carlota y el misterio del canario robado / La tribu de Camelot. La Carlota i el misteri del canari robat (catalán) - Ed. Destino / Ed. Estrella Polar, 2008.
- Així és la vida, Carlota (catalán) / Así es la vida, Carlota - Ed. Estrella Polar, 2009 (1ª Ed. Empúries, 1989) / Ed. Destino, 2009 (1ª Ed. SM, 1990).
- Ets galàctica, Carlota! (catalán) / ¡Eres galáctica, Carlota! - Ed. Estrella Polar, 2009 (1ª ed. Editorial Cruïlla, colección Gran Angular, 1994) / Editorial Destino, 2010 (1ª ed. 1998 en Ediciones SM).
- Emi y Max. Los elefantes enfurecidos / L'Emi i en Max. Els elefants enfurismats - Ed. La Galera, 2009.
- La tribu de Camelot. Carlota y el misterio del botín pirata / La tribu de Camelot. La Carlota i el misteri del botí pirata (catalán) - Ed. Destino / Ed. Estrella Polar, 2009.
- L'Emi i en Max. Guia de supervivència (catalán) / Emi y Max. Guía de supervivencia - Ed. La Galera, 2009.
- La tribu de Camelot. La Carlota i el misteri del passadís secret (catalán) / La tribu de Camelot. Carlota y el misterio del pasadizo secreto - Ed. Estrella Polar / Ed. Destino, 2009.
- Emi y Max. Los pozos contaminados / L'Emi i en Max. Els pous contaminats - Ed. La Galera, 2009.
- La tribu de Camelot. La Carlota i el misteri del túnel del terror (catalán) / La tribu de Camelot. Carlota y el misterio del túnel del terror - Ed. Estrella Polar / Ed. Destino, 2010.
- El diari groc de la Carlota(catalán) / El diario amarillo de Carlota- Ed. Empúries / Ed. Destino, 2010.
- Emi y Max. La amenaza del virus mutante/L'Emi i en Max. L'amenaça del virus mutant(catalán) - Ed. La Galera, 2010.
- La tribu de Camelot. La Carlota i el misteri de la catedral gòtica (catalán) / La tribu de Camelot. Carlota y el misterio de la catedral gótica - Ed. Estrella Polar / Ed. Destino, 2010.
- El gran llibre de la Carlota(catalán) - Ed. Empúries, 2010.
- La tribu de Camelot. Carlota y el misterio de la casa encantada / La tribu de Camelot. La Carlota i el misteri de la casa encantada (catalán) - Ed. Destino / Ed. Estrella Polar, 2010.
- La tribu de Camelot. Carlota y el misterio de la varita mágica / La tribu de Camelot. La Carlota i el misteri de la vareta màgica (catalán) - Ed. Destino / Ed. Estrella Polar, 2010.
- La tribu de Camelot. Carlota y el misterio de los gatos hipnotizados / La tribu de Camelot. La Carlota i el misteri dels gats hipnotitzats (catalán) - Ed. Destino / Ed. Estrella Polar, 2011.
- La tribu de Camelot. Carlota y el misterio de la extraña vampira / La tribu de Camelot. La Carlota i el misteri de l'estranya vampira (catalán) - Ed. Destino / Ed. Estrella Polar, 2011.
- La tribu de Camelot. Carlota y el misterio de las ranas encantadas / La tribu de Camelot. La Carlota i el misteri de les granotes encantades (catalán) - Ed. Destino / Ed. Estrella Polar, 2011.
- El diari taronja de la Carlota(catalán) / El diario naranja de Carlota- Ed. Empúries / Ed. Destino, 2011.
- La tribu de Camelot. Carlota y el misterio de los mensajes anónimos / La tribu de Camelot. La Carlota i el misteri dels missatges anònims (catalán) - Ed. Destino / Ed. Estrella Polar, 2011.
- La tribu de Camelot. Carlota y el misterio de las turquesas polvorientas / La tribu de Camelot. La Carlota i el misteri de les turqueses empolsegades (catalán) - Ed. Destino / Ed. Estrella Polar, 2012.
- La tribu de Camelot. Los pájaros enloquecidos / La tribu de Camelot. Els ocells embogits (catalán) - Ed. Destino / Ed. Estrella Polar, 2012.
- La tribu de Camelot. La noche de Halloween / La tribu de Camelot. La nit de Halloween (catalán) - Ed. Destino / Ed. Estrella Polar, 2012.
- El Club de los Malditos. Maldita hermana / El Club dels Maleïts. Maleïda germana (catalán) - Ed. Destino / Ed. Estrella Polar, 2012.
- La tribu de Camelot. El fantasma de la ópera / La tribu de Camelot. El fantasma del Liceu (catalán) - Ed. Destino / Ed. Estrella Polar, 2013.
- La tribu de Camelot. El drac de Sant Jordi (catalán) - Ed. Estrella Polar, 2013.
- La tribu de Camelot. El esqueleto emparedado / La tribu de Camelot. L'esquelet emparedat (catalán) - Ed. Destino / Ed. Estrella Polar, 2013.
- La tribu de Camelot. La duquesa de Olivares / La tribu de Camelot. La duquessa de Pals (catalán) - Ed. Destino / Ed. Estrella Polar, 2013.
- El Club de los Malditos. Malditos matones / El Club dels Maleïts. Maleïts brètols (catalán) - Ed. Destino / Ed. Estrella Polar, 2013.
- El Club de los Malditos. Malditas chicas / El Club dels Maleïts. Maleïdes noies (catalán) - Ed. Destino / Ed. Estrella Polar, 2014.

== Honors ==
- 1987, Premio Recull de Blanespor El gust del café
- 1987, Premio Ramón Muntaner de literatura juvenil for Dos cavalls (2 Cv)
- 1987, Premio Andròmina de narrativa de Valencia for Vol nocturn
- 1988, Premio White Ravens por la International Youth Library de Múnich for “2 CV”.
- 1990, Mención de honor de IBBY for Així és la vida Carlota
- 1990, Finalista del Premio Nacional de Literatura infantil y juvenil for Així és la vida Carlota
- 1998, Premio L’Odissea de Editorial Empúries, Grup 62 for Bitllet d'anada i tornada
- 2003, Mención de honor de la UNESCO for El diari lila de la Carlota
- 2003, 23rd Ramon Llull Novel Award El final del joc
- 2006, Premio White Ravens por la International Youth Library de Múnich for Busco una mare.
- 2008, - Premio "Participando creamos espacios de igualdad" in the category "Arte y Cultura, por el Consejo de Mujeres del Municipio de Madrid por el conjunto de su obra"
- 2010, Medal Francesc Macià al Trabajo for her role in Catalan literature and feminist struggle in the late 20th and early 21st centuries.
