= Carlota Gurt =

Spanish writer and translator

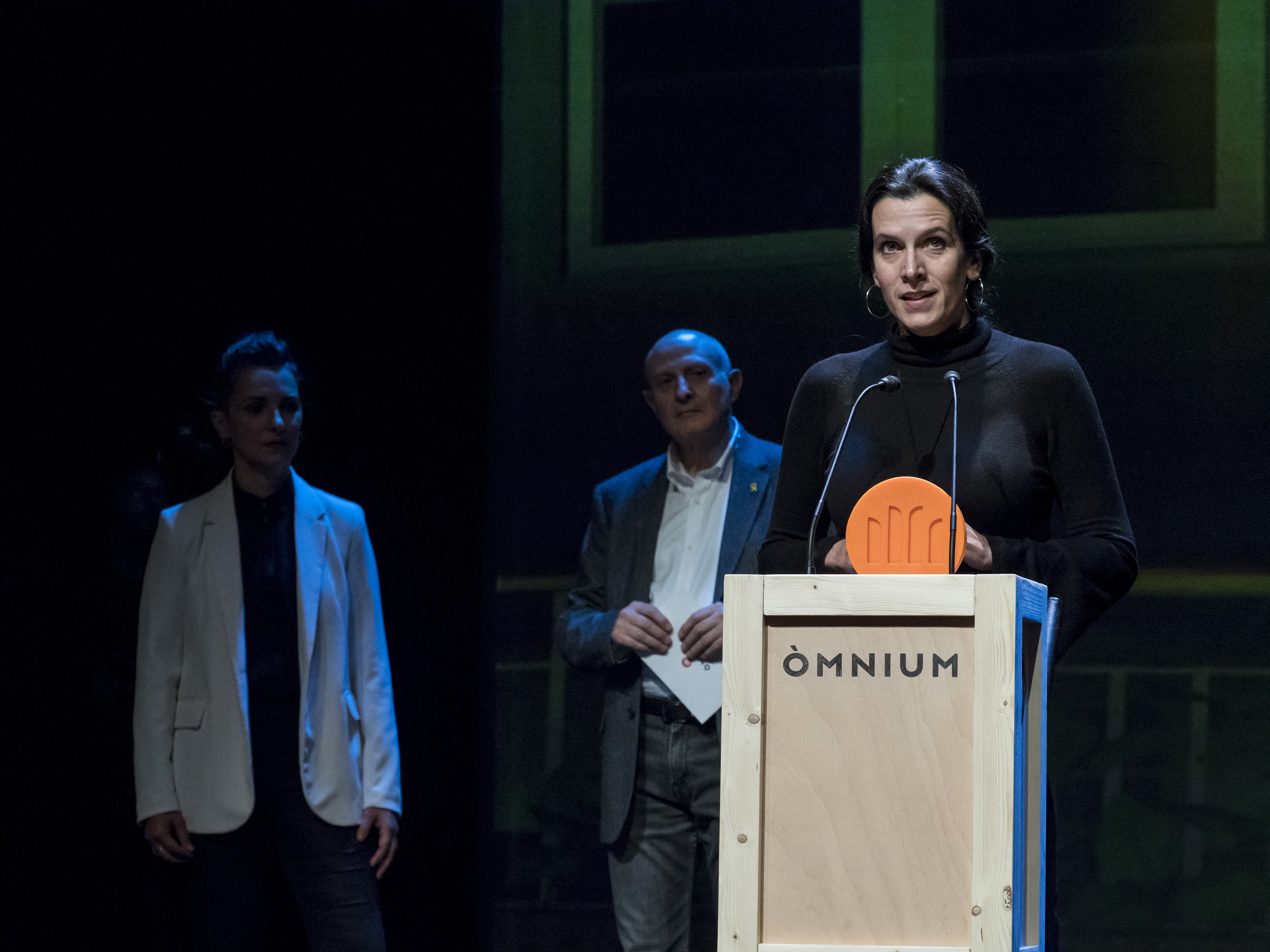
- Carlota Gurt
- Born: Carlota Gurt Daví; 1976 (age 49–50); Barcelona
- Occupations: writer, translator
- Notable work: Cavalcarem tota la nit, Sola, Biografia del foc

Carlota Gurt (Barcelona, 1976) is a Spanish writer who writes in Catalan and Spanish and translates several languages.

== Life ==
Gurt holds a degree in Translation and Interpretation from the University of Vic, in Humanities, Business and East Asian Studies from the Open University of Catalonia and in Audiovisual Communication from the Autonomous University of Barcelona.

Between 1998 and 2010, she worked in the field of performing arts, as head of production and assistant director of La Fura dels Baus, and as head of production at Temporada Alta performing arts festival of Girona.

As a translator, she has worked with texts by Nino Haratischwili, Hans Magnus Enzensberger, Peter Handke, Sarah Lark and David Safier, among many others.

In 2019 she won the Mercè Rodoreda Award by Òmnium Cultural with the short stories collection Cavalcarem tota la nit (We will ride all night).

In 2020, she received a literary Grant from the Institució de les Lletres Catalanes for her first novel, Sola, published in 2021.

In September 2023 she published Biografia del foc, a new collection of short stories that deal with the idea of catastrophe and the people effected.
