= Llucia Ramis =

Spanish writer (born 1977)

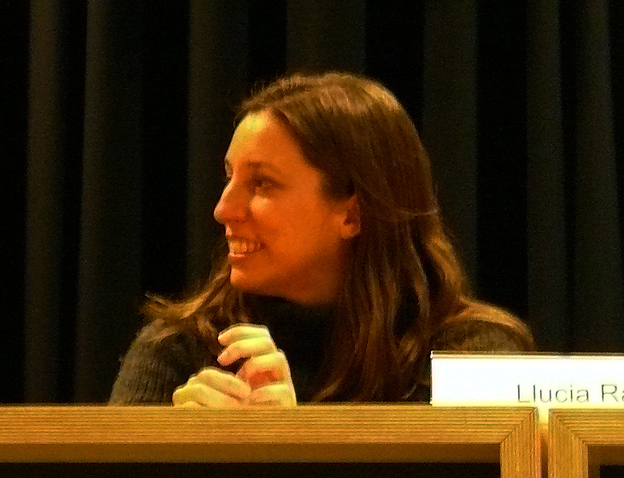
- Born: April 23, 1977 (age 49); Palma, Mallorca, Spain
- Occupations: Writer and journalist
- Writing career
- Notable works: Coses que et passen a Barcelona quan tens 30 anys (2008), Egosurfing (2010)
- Notable awards: Josep Pla prize (2010); 31 de Desembre (2010)

Llucia Ramis i Laloux (Palma, Majorca, April 23, 1977) is a Catalan language journalist and writer. She studied journalism at Universitat Autònoma de Barcelona, and has worked in different media, including the newspaper Diario de Mallorca, the literary magazine Quimera, COM Ràdio, Rac1 and the Catalan edition of El Mundo newspaper. In El Mundo she publishes the column Plexiglàs of the Tendències supplement.

Her début novel was Coses que et passen a Barcelona quan tens 30 anys (Editorial Columna, 2008), and it received favorable reviews. In 2010, she won the Josep Pla Award with her second novel Egosurfing (Editorial Destino, 2010). She also participated in the story collections Odio Barcelona [I hate Barcelona](2008) and Matar en Barcelona [Killing in Barcelona](2009) .

== Selected works ==
- 2008: Coses que et passen a Barcelona quan tens 30 anys (Barcelona: Columna), to be published in the United States as Things that happen to you in Barcelona when you are thirty
- 2010: Egosurfing (Barcelona: Destino)
- 2013: Tot allò que una tarda morí amb les bicicletes [Everything that one afternoon died with the bicycles] (Barcelona: Destino)

== Awards ==
- 2010: Josep Pla Award for Egosurfing
- 2010: 31 de Desembre|Premi Bartomeu Rosselló-Pòrcel prize, in recognition of her cultural tasks.
