= Alfred Bosch =

Spanish politician (born 1961)

The Honourable Alfred Bosch
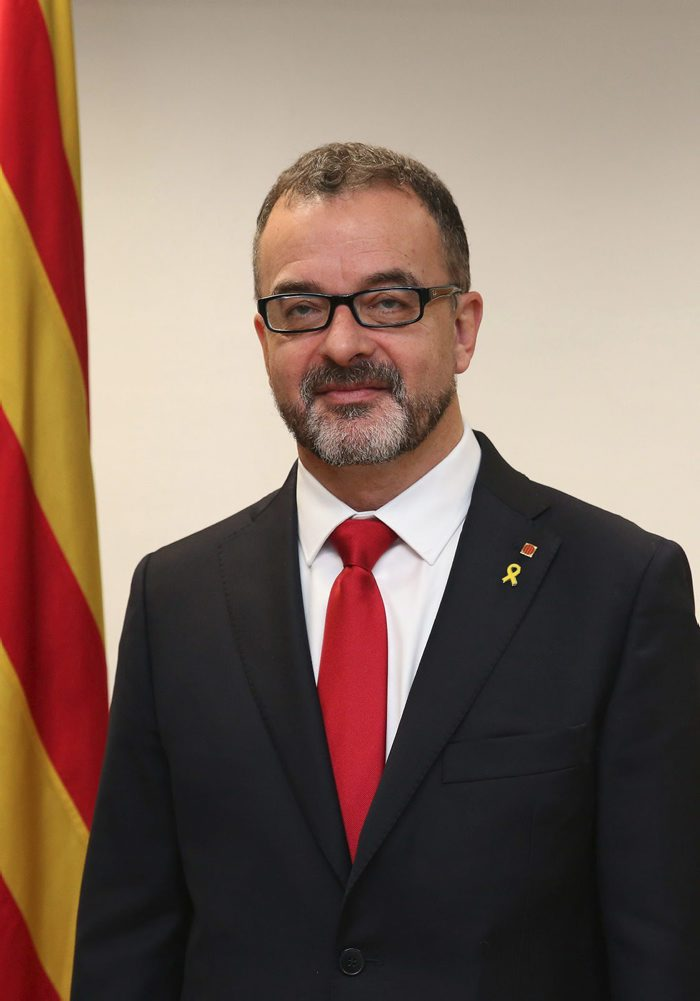
- Bosch in November 2018

Minister of Foreign Action, Institutional Relations and Transparency of Catalonia
- In office 22 November 2018 – 9 March 2020
- President: Quim Torra
- Preceded by: Ernest Maragall
- Succeeded by: Bernat Solé

Spokesperson of the Republican Left Group in the Congress of Deputies
- In office 2011–2016
- Preceded by: Joan Ridao
- Succeeded by: Joan Tardà

Member of the Congress of Deputies
- In office 5 December 2011 – 27 October 2015
- Constituency: Barcelona

Member of Barcelona City Council
- In office 13 June 2015 – 23 November 2018

Personal details
- Born: Alfred Bosch i Pascual; 17 April 1961 (age 65) Barcelona, Catalonia, Spain
- Party: Catalonia Yes; Republican Left of Catalonia
- Education: Autonomous University of Barcelona; University of Barcelona
- Occupation: Academic, journalist, author

Alfred Bosch i Pascual (born 17 April 1961) is a Catalan academic, journalist, author, politician and a former Minister of Foreign Action, Institutional Relations and Transparency of Catalonia. He was previously a member of the Congress of Deputies of Spain and a member of Barcelona City Council.

== Early life and family ==
Bosch was born on 17 April 1961 in Barcelona, Catalonia. He is the second of five siblings and grew up in the Esquerra de l'Eixample district of Barcelona. He later lived in Sant Antoni before settling in Ciutat Vella in the 1980s. He was educated at a British school near Barcelona where he was taught in English.

Bosch joined the Autonomous University of Barcelona (UAB) in 1979, graduating in 1984 with a degree in philosophy and letters.

== Career ==
In 1984, after graduating from university, Bosch joined the Barcelona team bidding to host the 1992 Summer Olympics and from 1987, after the city was chosen, he worked for Comitè Organitzador de les Olimpíades de Barcelona (COOB'92), the organising committee. Afterwards he moved to South Africa to research his doctoral thesis and in 1994 he received a Ph.D. degree from the University of Barcelona after producing a thesis titled Nelson Mandela, l'Últim Home-Déu (Nelson Mandela, the last Man-God).

Bosch joined the UAB in 1995 as a professor of African history. He has taught at several other universities including Pompeu Fabra University, Autonomous University of Madrid, University of London, University of the Witwatersrand, University of Ibadan, Hood College and University of Chicago.

Between 1984 and 1996 Bosch also travelled the world, working as a free lance journalist reporting on conflicts such as such as apartheid South Africa, Palestinian intifada, Lebanese Civil War, Nicaraguan Revolution, Sri Lankan Civil War and Yugoslav Wars. His work was published in Avui, Diario de Barcelona, El Periódico de Catalunya, El Temps, Catalunya Ràdio and others.

Bosch has written several novels and essays. His 1997 essay La Via Africana won the Joan Fuster Prize for Essay. The novel L'Atles Furtiu won the Sant Jordi prize in 1997 whilst Les Set Aromes del Món won the Ramon Llull Novel Award in 2004. He has also won the Néstor Luján and Prudenci Bertrana prizes.

=== Politics ===
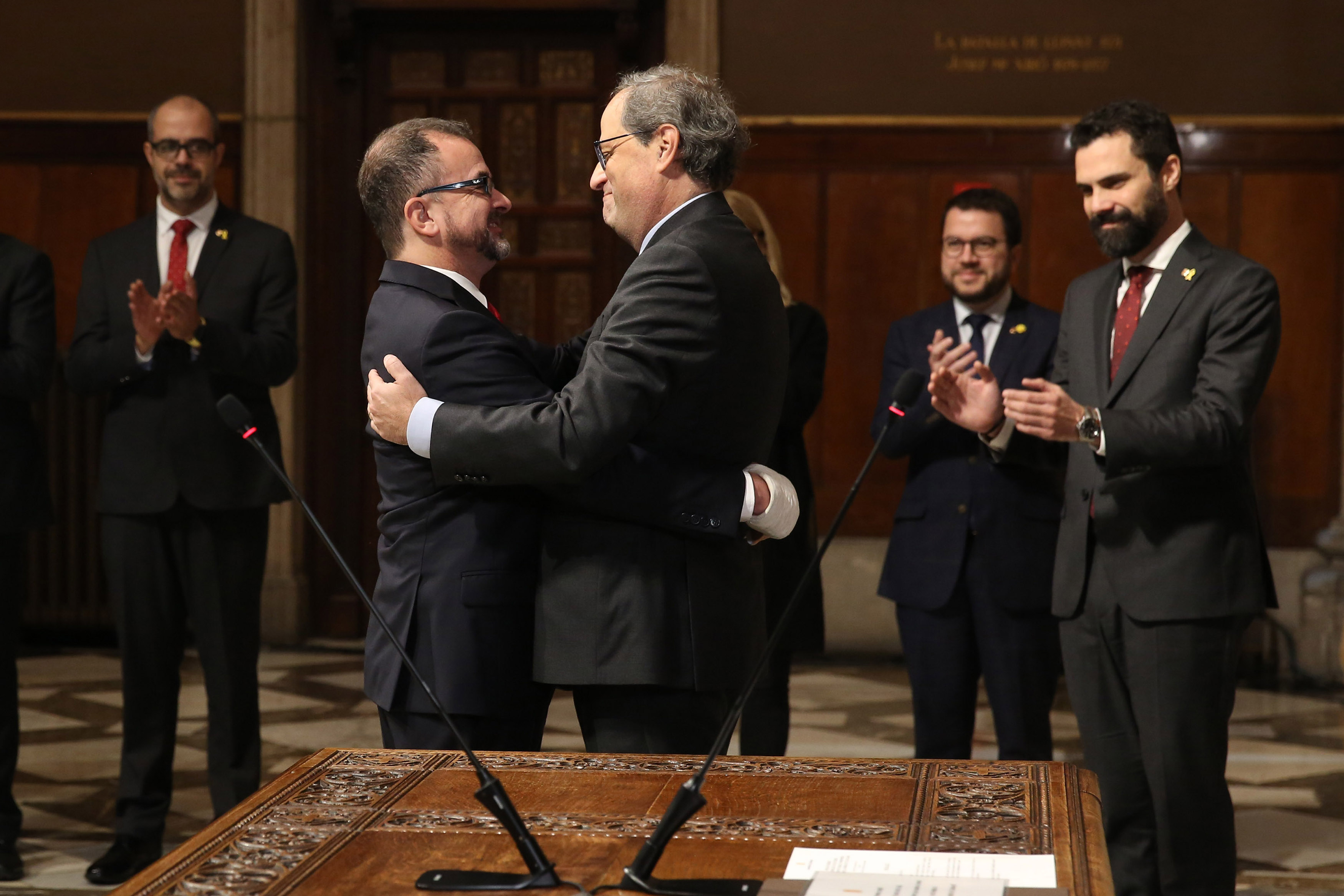
Bosch is sworn in as Minister of Foreign Action, Institutional Relations and Transparency on 23 November 2018

In 2010 Bosch became spokesperson for Barcelona Decideix, the organisation behind the 2011 independence referendum in Barcelona. Bosch was one of the founding members of the secretariat of the Assemblea Nacional Catalana (ANC) in 2011 and he has served on the board of Òmnium Cultural.

Bosch contested the 2011 general election as an independent Republican Left of Catalonia–Catalonia Yes (ERC–CatSí) electoral alliance candidate in the Province of Barcelona and was elected to the Congress of Deputies. He was spokesman for the ERC group in the congress. In 2013, he was suspended from Congress for addressing it in English as part of a protest against an anti-corruption bill.

Bosch contested the 2015 local elections as a Republican Left of Catalonia-Left Movement-Barcelona Open City-Advance-Catalonia Yes-Acord Municipal (ERC-MES-BcnCO-AVANCEM-CatSí-AM) electoral alliance candidate in Barcelona and was elected.

In November 2018 he replaced Ernest Maragall as Catalonia's Minister of Foreign Action, Institutional Relations and Transparency. He resigned on 9 March 2020 after his chief of staff was accused of harassment of department workers.

== Personal life ==
Bosch is divorced and has two children. He speaks Catalan, Spanish, English, French and Portuguese. He is an amateur opera singer and has taken part in various zarzuela and musicals.

== Published works ==
- Fulls Impermeables (1984)
- Cronicàlia (1986)
- Nelson Mandela, l'Últim Home-Déu (1995, Curial; ISBN 8472569039, 9788472569034)
- Herois d'Azània (1996)
- La Via Africana (1997, E. Climent; ISBN 847502517X, 9788475025179)
- L'Atles Furtiu (1998)
- Alia la Sublim (2000)
- El Imperio Que Nunca Existió (2001)
- L'Avi (2001)
- 1714 (2002)
- Europa Sense Embuts (2002)
- Les Set Aromes del Món (2004)
- Heretaràs la Rambla (2005)
- Catalans (2006)
- Inquisitio (2006)
- I Ara Què? (2011)

== Electoral history ==
Electoral history of Alfred Bosch
Election	Constituency	Party	Alliance	No.	Result
2011 general	Province of Barcelona	Independent	Republican Left of Catalonia–Catalonia Yes	1	Elected
2015 local	Barcelona	Catalonia Yes	Republican Left of Catalonia-Left Movement-Barcelona Open City- Advance-Catalonia Yes-Acord Municipal	1	Elected
