= Robert Saladrigas =

Spanish writer, journalist and literary critic (1940–2018)

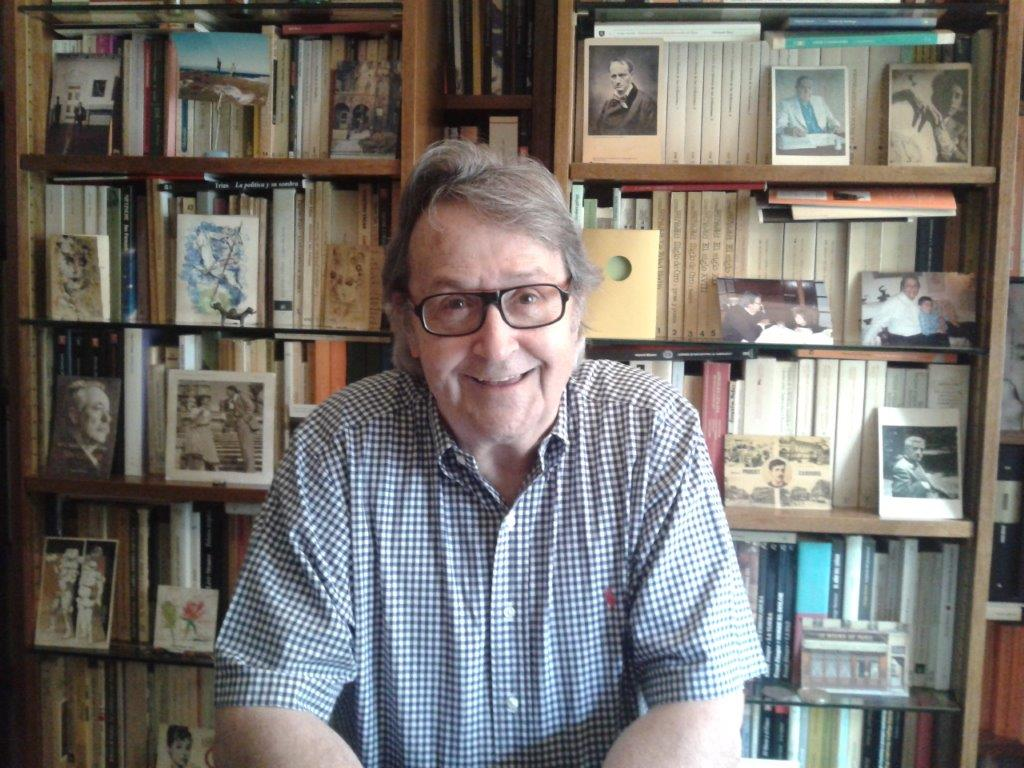
- Born: 12 February 1940; Barcelona, Catalonia, Spain
- Died: 22 October 2018 (aged 78); Barcelona
- Occupations: Writer, journalist, literary critic
- Writing career
- Language: Catalan, Spanish,

Robert Saladrigas Riera (Barcelona, 12 February 1940 – 22 October 2018, Barcelona) was a Spanish writer, journalist and literary critic, renowned for his articles on foreign literature published in CULTURA/S, the literary supplement of La Vanguardia newspaper. His literary work has been translated into Spanish, Portuguese and Romanian.

== Biography ==
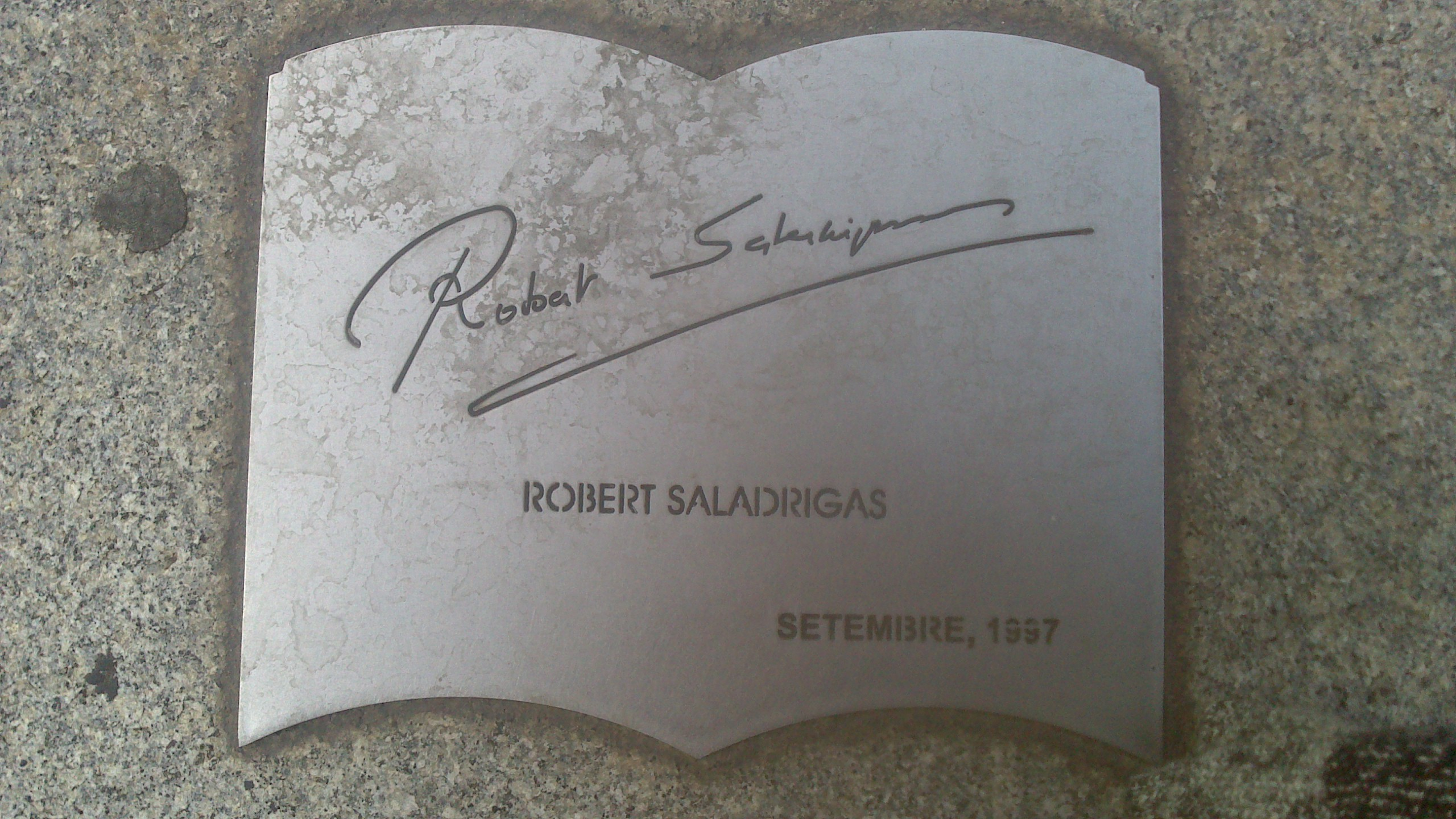
Plate with Robert Saladrigas signature in Book's Monument (Barcelona)

He started Economics studies but very soon switched to journalism and literature. He wrote for several newspapers: El Correo Catalán, Tele/eXpres, ABC and La Vanguardia (where he was in charge of the supplement Libros between 1981 and 1994) and collaborated with the magazines Siglo 20, Tele/Estel, Cavall Fort, Mundo and Destino. In 1974 he founded Edicions Galba, which he led until 1978. From 1978 to 1984 he directed in the Catalan Circuit of TVE the cultural programmes Signes and Veus i formes, the five-episode novel Cambres Barrades and the series "Històries de Cara i Creu", which consists of thirteen short stories. He was in charge of and participated in other cultural programmes on Ràdio 4, Radio Peninsular, COM Ràdio and Catalunya Ràdio.

== Bibliography ==
- Novels in Catalan
  - 1966 El cau
  - 1967 Entre juliol i setembre
  - 1970 Boires
  - 1970 L'Àlex, el 8 i el 10
  - 1970 52 hores a través de la pell
  - 1971 El viatge prodigiós d'en Ferran Pinyol
  - 1977 Històries a mig camí
  - 1977 Aquell gust agre de l'estel
  - 1979 Néixer de nou, cada dia
  - 1980 Pel camí ral del nord
  - 1981 Sota la volta del temps
  - 1983 Imatges del meu mirall
  - 1983 Sóc Emma
  - 1984 Visions de cada hora
  - 1986 Memorial de Claudi M. Broch
  - 1990 Claris
  - 1991 Tauromàquia: sol i lluna
  - 1992 El sol de la tarda
  - 1994 Un temps del diable
  - 1995 Amic Lu
  - 1996 La mar no està mai sola
  - 1999 Còmplices de ciutat
  - 2004 La llibreta groga
  - 2005 Biografia
  - 2008 L'altre
  - 2012 L'estiu de la pluja
- Essays in Catalan
  - 1973 L'Escola del Mar i la renovació pedagògica a Catalunya. Converses amb Pere Vergés
  - 1974 Literatura i societat a la Catalunya d'avui
  - 2014 Paraules d'escriptors. Monòlegs amb creadors catalans dels setanta
- Essays in Spanish
  - 1965 Notas de un viaje
  - 1967 Arañas
  - 1972 Las confesiones no católicas de España
  - 2012 Voces del "boom". Monólogos
  - 2013 De un lector que cuenta. Impresiones sobre la narrativa extranjera contemporánea. De Thomas Mann a Jonathan Franzen
  - 2014 Rostros escritos. Monólogos con creadores españoles de los setenta
  - 2017 En tierra de ficción. Recorrido por la narrativa contemporánea. De Edgar Allan Poe a Evan Dara

== Awards ==
- 1966 Joaquim Ruyra for Entre juliol i setembre
- 1969 Víctor Català for Boires
- 1986 Premi de la crítica for Memorial de Claudi M. Broch
- 1991 Sant Jordi de Novel·la for El sol de la tarda
- 1992 Joan Crexells for El sol de la tarda
- 1996 Carlemany for La mar no està mai sola
- 2004 Josep Pla Award for La llibreta groga
