= Miquel de Palol =

Spanish architect and writer (born 1953)

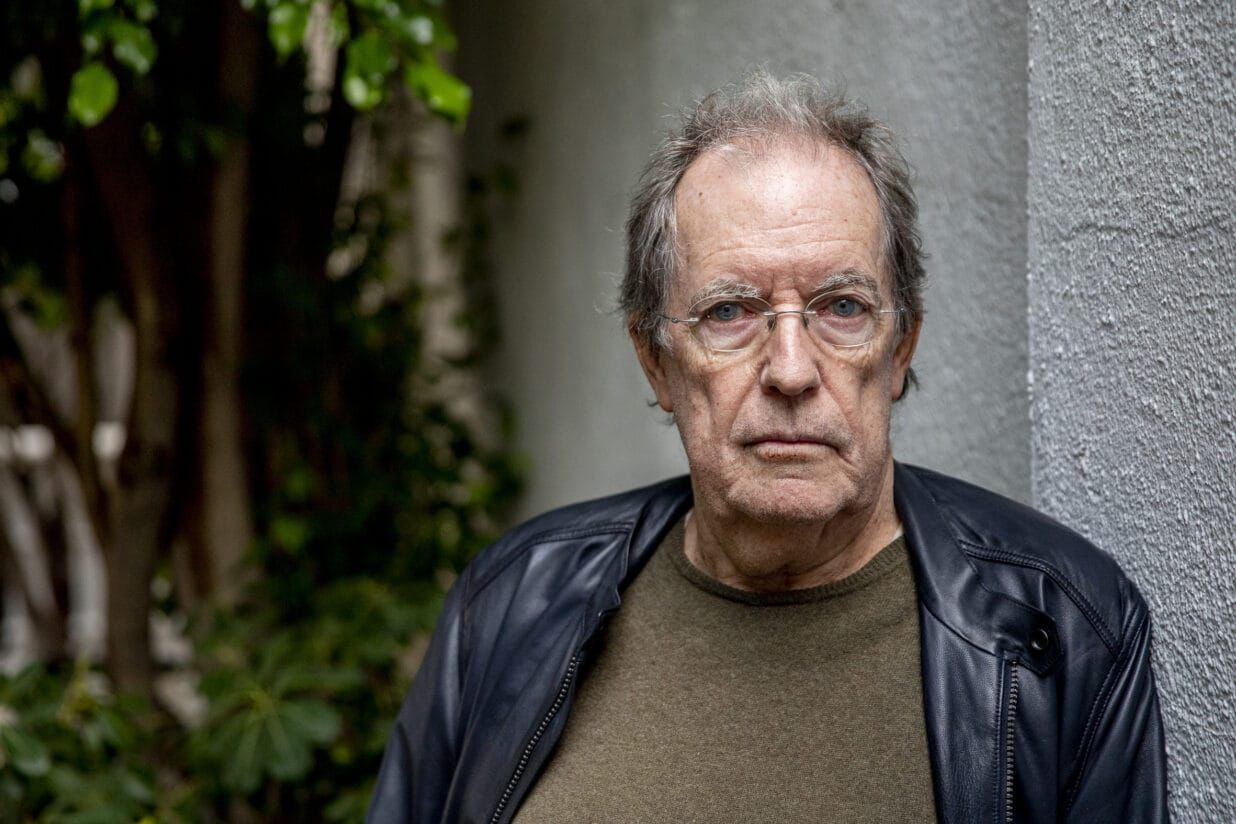
Miquel de Palol (2020)

Miquel de Palol i Muntanyola (born 2 April 1953) is a Catalan architect, poet and storyteller. He is the son of the archaeologist Pere de Palol.

In 2011 he was appointed president of the Association of Collegiate Writers of Catalonia. His first novel in Catalan, El jardí dels set crepuscles (The Garden of Seven Twilights), earned in the year of its publication (1989) almost all the prizes available for works in Catalan language.

== Biography ==
Born in Barcelona, he lived in Valladolid until he was 17, due to his father's job. Back in Barcelona, he studied Architecture and began his literary activity as a poet. In 1982 he won the Carles Riba poetry award with El porxo de les mirades. For this same work he received, in 1984, the Critica Serra d'Or award.

His first novel published in Catalan, El jardí dels set crepuscles, earned in the year of its publication (1989) almost all the prizes awarded in the Catalan language (Joan Crexells, Crítica Serra d'Or, National of the Criticism and National Literature of the Generalitat of Catalonia, as well as the Critical Eye Award). In 1994 he received the Ciutat de Barcelona award in the Catalan language for Igur Neblí. In 1997 he won the Josep Pla award for the play El legislador and the Víctor Català award for Tales for old teenagers. In 1998 he won the Sant Jordi award for Novel with El quincorn.

His narrative production moves between the fantastic and legendary story and philosophical speculation. It has been translated into Spanish, German, Dutch, Italian, and English. Palol has also written widely on the subject of Catalan culture in the age of globalization.

== Bibliography ==
=== Poetry ===
- Lotus (1a part). Barcelona: Revista Serra d’Or, 1972
- Lotus (2a part). Girona: El Pont, 1973
- Delta. Barcelona: El Mall, 1973
- Llet i vi. Barcelona, 1974
- Arxiu de Poemes independents. Barcelona: Pòrtic, 1975
- L’Aneguet lleig. Barcelona, 1977
- Quan?. Barcelona: Proa, 1979
- La flor de l’atzavara de Can Coris (1980)
- Encara mor aquella primavera. Barcelona: El Mall, 1981
- Salamó. Palma de Mallorca: Tafal, 1981
- Rapsòdies de Montcada. València: El Cingle, 1982
- El porxo de les mirades. Barcelona: Proa, 1983
- El viatge misteriós. Barcelona: Taller de Picasso, 1983
- Indiferència. Barcelona: Proa, 1986
- La nit italiana. València: Gregal, 1986
- Quintern. Màlaga: Ángel Caffarena, 1992
- Estudis en menor. Palma de Mallorca: El Cantor, 1995
- El sol i la mort. Barcelona: Proa, 1996
- Gralles al galliner. Barcelona: Proa, 1996
- Nombra y tendrás. Madrid: Visor, 1998
- Nocturns. Barcelona: Columna, 2003
- Miquel de Palol. Lleida: Universitat de Lleida, 2002
- Fot-li, que som catalans! (Miquel de Palol, Xavier Bru de Sala, Julià de Jòdar) Barcelona: L’Esfera dels Llibres, 2005

=== Prose ===
- El jardí dels set crepuscles. Barcelona: Proa, 1989
- Sense compromís de perversitat (with Maria de la Pau Janer). Barcelona: Tanagra, 1991
- Les Tres Ties. Barcelona: Destino, 1992
- Amb l’olor d’Àfrica. Barcelona: Proa, 1992
- Grafomàquia. Barcelona: Proa, 1993
- Ígur Neblí. Barcelona: Proa, 1994
- L’àngel d’hora en hora. Barcelona: Proa, 1995
- El legislador. Barcelona: Destino, 1997
- Consulta a Ripseu. Barcelona: Proa, 1997
- La fortuna del senyor Filemó. Barcelona: Cruïlla, 1997
- La Venus del Kilimanjaro (mit Xavier Moret). Barcelona: Cruïlla, 1998
- Contes per vells adolescents. Barcelona: Proa, 1998
- El Quincorn: una història romàntica. Barcelona: Proa, 1999
- El Troiacord. Barcelona: Columna, 2001 (Contents: Tres passos al sud, Una altra cosa, Les ales egípcies, Leandre no s’hi ha negat, El combat amb l’àngel)
- Tancat per vacances (2003) (with Sebastià Alzamora, Lluís Calvo, Gemma Lienas, Andreu Martín, Isabel Olesti, Eva Piquer, Maria Mercè Roca, Care Santos i Lluís Maria Todó)
- Les concessions. Barcelona: Columna, 2004
- Contes en forma de L. Palma de Mallorca: Moll, 2004
- Gallifa. Barcelona: Columna, 2006
- Un home vulgar. Barcelona: Edicions 62, 2006
- El Lleó de Böcklin i sis contes més. Lleida: Pagès editors, 2006
- Aire pàl·lid/Palimpsest. Barcelona: Columna, 2007
- El Testament d'Alcestis. Barcelona: Editorial Empúries, 2009
