= Josep Pla Award =

Spanish literary award

- Awarded for: Catalan literature
- Sponsored by: Ediciones Destino
- Date: 6 January
- Venue: Hotel El Palace, Barcelona
- Country: Spain
- First award: 1968
- Website: www.grup62.cat/premis/premi-josep-pla

The Josep Pla Award (Spanish: Premio Josep Pla; Catalan: Premi Josep Pla) is a Spanish literary prize, awarded by the Destino publishing house since 1968, to a prose text written in Catalan. It is open to all genres: novel, short story, narrative, travel book, memoir, biography, diary, etc. Its name pays tribute to Josep Pla, considered one of the most important prose writers of contemporary Catalan literature.

It is one of the most prestigious prizes awarded to literature in Catalan. The award ceremony takes place every 6 January, during the night of Epiphany, at the Hotel El Palace in Barcelona. The Premio Nadal is also awarded at the same ceremony.

== Winners ==
Edition	Year	Work	Author	Ref.
1st	1968	Onades sobre una roca deserta	Terenci Moix	
2nd	1969	Difunts sota els ametllers en flor	Baltasar Porcel	
3rd	1970	El testament de Praga	Teresa Pàmies	
4th	1971	Els alicorns	Gabriel Janer Manila	
5th	1972	El temps barrat	Alexandre Cirici	
6th	1973	Andrea Victrix	Llorenç Villalonga	
7th	1974	El vel de Maia	Marià Manent	
8th	1975	Historia del cercle artistic de Sant Lluc	Enric Jardí	
9th	1976	Contraataquen	Carles Reig	
10th	1977	Josep Pla o la raó narrativa	Josep Maria Castellet	
11th	1978	Les closes	Maria Àngels Anglada	
12th	1979	Gent que he conegut	Jaume Miravitlles	
13th	1980	La noia a la sorra	Jordi Sarsanedas	
14th	1981	El cingle verd	Josep Piera	
15th	1982	Interior amb difunts	Olga Xirinacs	
16th	1983	Fins al cel	Pau Faner	
17th	1984	Papers contra la cinta magnética	Norbert Bilbeny	
18th	1985	Tretze biografies imperfectes	Gerard Vergés	
19th	1986	El present que m'acull	Maria Mercè Roca	
20th	1987	El solc de les hores	Albert Manent	
21st	1988	Quadern venecià	Àlex Susanna	
22nd	1989–1990	Illa Flaubert	Miquel Àngel Riera	
23rd	1991	El cortesà i el seu fantasma	Xavier Rubert de Ventós	
24th	1992	La japonesa	Jordi Coca	
25th	1993	El cap de Penteu	Xavier Roca Ferrer	
26th	1994	Dins el darrer blau	Carme Riera	
27th	1995	Dibuix de dona amb ocells blancs	Isabel Olesti	
28th	1996	Cita a tombuctú	Pep Subirós	
29th	1997	El legislador	Miquel de Palol	
30th	1998	L'home de l'abric	Valentí Puig	
31st	1999	Apocalipsi blanc	Francesc Puigpelat	
32nd	2000	Feli estheticienne	Empar Moliner	
33rd	2001	Nitrato de Chile	Jordi Llavina	
34th	2002	Una victòria diferent	Eva Piquer	
35th	2003	L'últim evangeli	Héctor Bofill	
36th	2004	La llibreta groga	Robert Saladrigas	
37th	2005	La pell i la princesa	Sebastià Alzamora	
38th	2006	El mal francés	Lluís Maria Todó	
39th	2007	El retorn de Voltaire	Martí Domínguez	
40th	2008	La batalla de Walter Stamm	Melcior Comes	
41st	2009	El silenci	Gaspar Hernàndez	
42nd	2010	Egosurfing	Llucia Ramis	
43rd	2011	El cau del conill	Cristian Segura	
44th	2012	Quan érem feliços	Rafel Nadal	
45th	2013	Una famíla exemplar	Genís Sinca	
46th	2014	Els ambaixadors	Albert Villaró i Boix	
47th	2015	El poeta del poble	Andreu Carranza	
48th	2016	Aquella porta giratòria	Lluís Foix	
49th	2017	La fada negra	Xavier Theros	
50th	2018	Bon dia, són les vuit!	Antoni Bassas i Onieva	
51st	2019	La vigília	Marc Artigau i Queralt	
52nd	2020	Pluja d'estels	Laia Aguilar Sariol	
53rd	2021	Tàndem	Maria Barbal	
54th	2022	La vall de la llum	Toni Cruanyes	
55th	2023	La llei de l'hivern	Gemma Ventura Farré	
56th	2024	La Germandat de l'Àngel Caigut	Jaume Clotet	
