= Moisès Broggi =

Catalan physician and pacifist

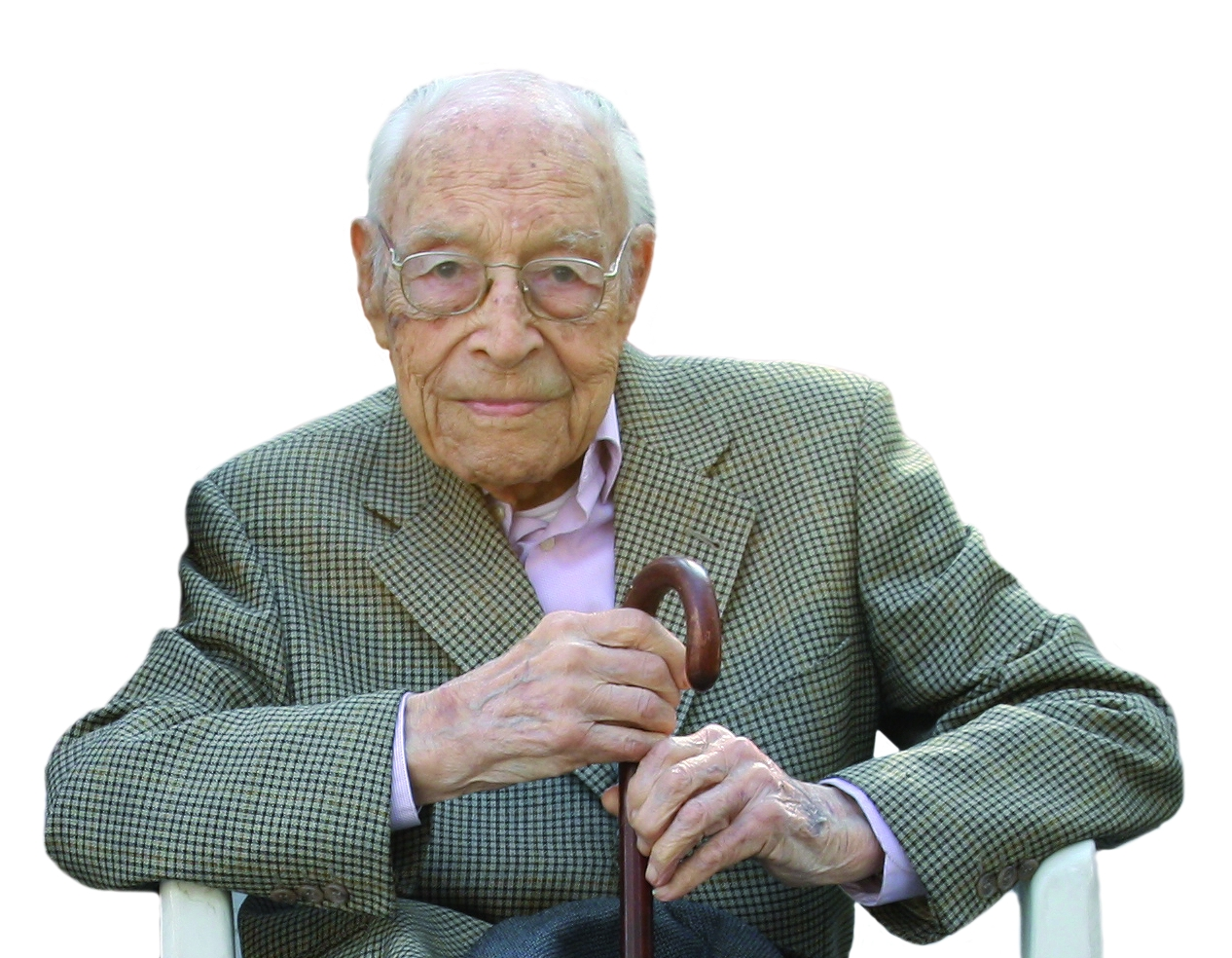
- Born: 18 May 1909; Barcelona, Catalonia
- Died: 31 December 2012 (aged 104); Barcelona, Catalonia

Moisès Broggi i Vallès (Catalan pronunciation: [mujˈzɛz ˈβɾɔdʒi]; 18 May 1908 – 31 December 2012) was a Catalan physician and pacifist. Broggi studied medicine at University of Barcelona. He worked as a field surgeon in the Spanish Civil War for the International Brigades.

== Awards ==
- Creu de Sant Jordi (1981)
