= Joan Tardà =

Spanish teacher and politician

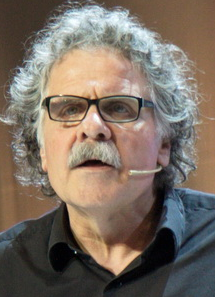
- Tardà in March 2017

Spokesperson of the Republican Left Group in the Congress of Deputies
- In office 13 January 2016 – 21 May 2019
- Preceded by: Alfred Bosch
- Succeeded by: Gabriel Rufián

Member of the Congress of Deputies of Spain
- In office 30 March 2004 – 5 March 2019
- Constituency: Barcelona

Member of Cornellà de Llobregat City Council
- In office 1979–1983
- In office 1999–2004

Personal details
- Born: Joan Tardà i Coma; 26 September 1953 (age 72) Cornellà de Llobregat, Catalonia, Spain
- Citizenship: Spanish
- Party: Republican Left of Catalonia
- Other political affiliations: Republican Left of Catalonia–Sovereigntists

Joan Tardà i Coma (born 26 September 1953) is a Catalan teacher and politician from Spain. He is a former member of the Congress of Deputies of Spain.

== Early life and family ==
Tardà was born on 26 September 1953 in Cornellà de Llobregat, Catalonia. He is the son a bricklayer and a cinema ticket seller from Cornellà de Llobregat. From the age of twelve Tardà worked at the same cinema as his mother. He has a Master of Arts degree.

Tardà was a member of Red Flag until 1974. He was a member of the Unified Socialist Party of Catalonia (PSUC) from 1974 to 1976 when he joined the newly formed Left Nationalists (NE). Following the dissolution of NE Tardà joined the Republican Left of Catalonia (ERC) and was president of its Cornellà branch from 1996 to 1999. He was also a member of Assemblea de Batlles and the Committee of Solidarity with the Catalan Patriots (Comitès de Solidaritat amb els Patriotes Catalans).

== Career ==
Tardà and other teachers taught Catalan after school as the Fascist Francoist dictatorship had banned the teaching of Catalan in schools. He has taught Catalan language and literature at the IES Institut Esteve Terradas secondary school since 1980.

Tardà was elected to Cornellà de Llobregat Municipal Council at the 1979 local election as an independent PSUC candidate, serving until 1983. He contested the 1999 local elections as a Republican Left of Catalonia-Acord Municipal (ERC-AM) electoral alliance candidate in Cornellà and was re-elected. He was re-elected at the 2003 local election. He resigned in September 2004.

Tardà contested the 2004 general election as an ERC candidate in the Province of Barcelona and was elected to the Congress of Deputies. He was re-elected at the 2008, 2011, 2015 and 2016 general elections.

In March 2019 Tardà announced that he would not seek re-election at the next general election and would quit national politics. At the 2019 general election Tardà was placed 32nd on the Republican Left of Catalonia–Sovereigntists electoral alliance's list of candidates in the Province of Barcelona but the alliance only managed to win eight seats in the province and as a result he failed to get re-elected to the Congress of Deputies.

== Personal life ==
Tardà's partner Empar Fernández is a history teacher. They have two children.

== Electoral history ==
Electoral history of Joan Tardà
Election	Constituency	Party	Alliance	No.	Result
1979 local	Cornellà de Llobregat	Independent	Unified Socialist Party of Catalonia		Elected
1999 local	Cornellà de Llobregat	Republican Left of Catalonia	Republican Left of Catalonia-Acord Municipal	1	Elected
2003 local	Cornellà de Llobregat	Republican Left of Catalonia	Republican Left of Catalonia-Acord Municipal	1	Elected
2004 general	Province of Barcelona	Republican Left of Catalonia		3	Elected
2008 general	Province of Barcelona	Republican Left of Catalonia		2	Elected
2011 general	Province of Barcelona	Republican Left of Catalonia	Republican Left of Catalonia–Catalonia Yes	2	Elected
2015 general	Province of Barcelona	Republican Left of Catalonia	Republican Left of Catalonia–Catalonia Yes	2	Elected
2016 general	Province of Barcelona	Republican Left of Catalonia	Republican Left of Catalonia–Catalonia Yes	2	Elected
2019 general	Province of Barcelona	Republican Left of Catalonia	Republican Left of Catalonia–Sovereigntists	32	Not elected
