= Monika Zgustová =

Czech writer and translator (born 1957)

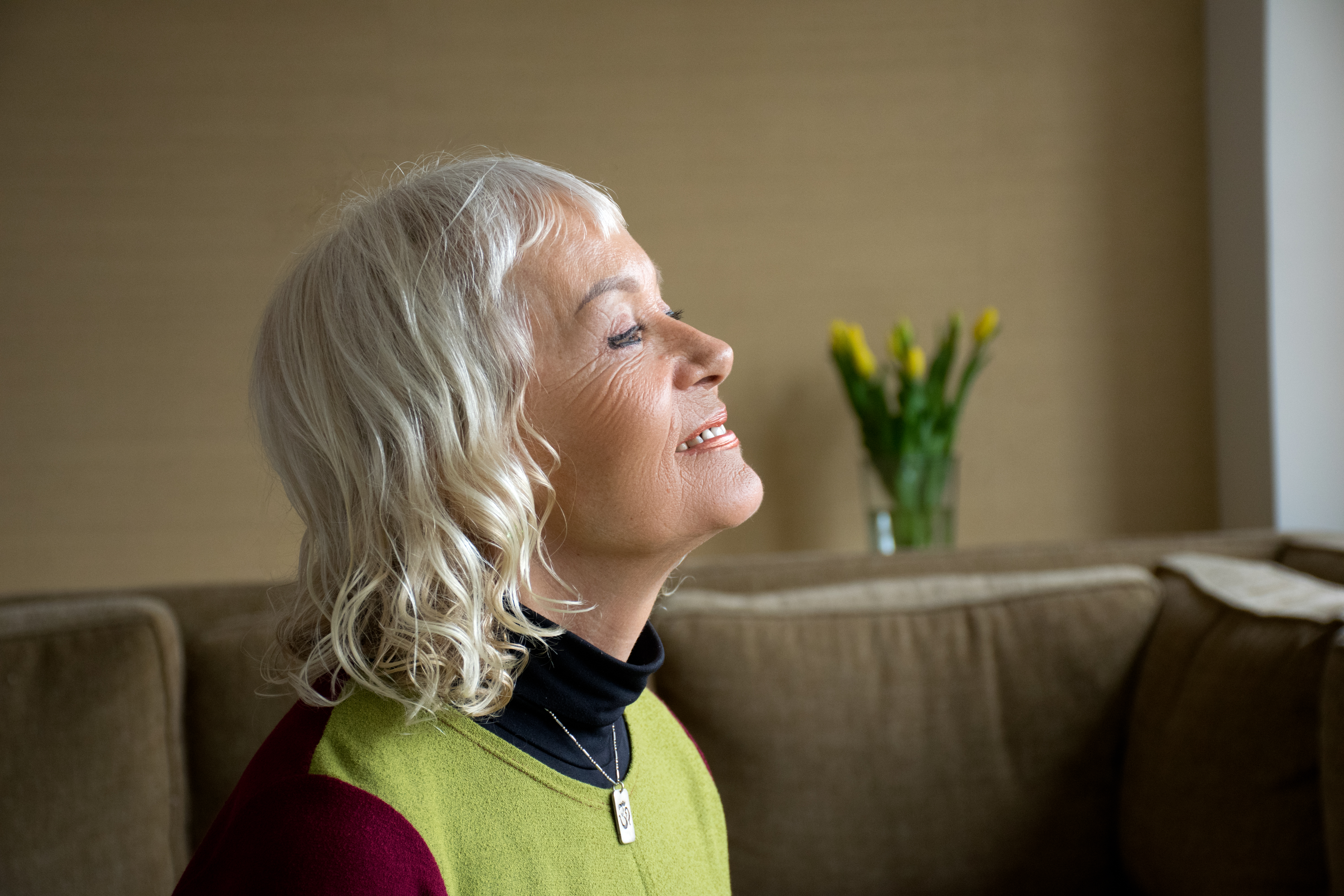
- Born: 22 March 1957 (age 69); Prague, Czech Republic
- Occupations: Writer and translator
- Writing career
- Period: 1980–present
- Notable works: Dressed for a Dance in the Snow, The Silent Woman, Roses from Stalin
- Website: monikazgustova.com

Monika Zgustová (22 March 1957, Prague) is a Czech writer and translator. She is a key figure in the introduction of Czech literature in Spain, translating into Spanish and Catalan.

== Biography ==
She studied comparative literature at the University of Illinois in the 1970s. Since the 1980s, she has lived in Barcelona.

She is the translator of many major works of Czech fiction; she has translated more than fifty books from Czech and Russian into Spanish and Catalan, including works by Bohumil Hrabal, Jaroslav Hašek, Václav Havel, Jaroslav Seifert, Milan Kundera, Fyodor Dostoyevsky, Isaac Babel, Anna Akhmatova and Marina Tsvetaeva. She regularly writes articles and editorials for El País (Spain), La Vanguardia (Spain), The Nation (USA), Lidové Noviny (Czech Republic) and CounterPunch (USA).

Zgustova's most acclaimed books are Dressed for a Dance in the Snow (2020), named a Notable Translated Book of the Year by World Literature Today, an account of women's resilience in Stalin's forced labor camps, and The Silent Woman (2005), a finalist for Spain's Premio Nacional de Narrativa, which depicts a twentieth-century woman's life against a backdrop of war and political turmoil.

Her most recent book, I'm Milena from Prague (2024), focuses on the life of Milena Jesenská, a journalist and translator associated with Franz Kafka, and explores her life, courage, and literary work.

Zgustova has been praised internationally since 2005 and her works have been published in more than ten languages. She has received more than 10 awards and honors.

== Works ==
=== Non-Fiction ===
- Beautiful Stranger. Prague and its uprooted culture (2021)
- Dressed for a Dance in the Snow (2020, Other Press, ISBN 9781590511848) Original Spanish version Vestidas para un baile en la nieve (2017)
- The Intruder. An Intimate Portrait of Gala Dalí (2018)
- The Bitter Fruit of the Garden of Delights: Life and Work of Bohumil Hrabal (2014)

=== Fiction ===
- I'm Milena from Prague (2024; original Spanish title Soy Milena de Praga)
- We Saw Each Other Better in the Darkness (2022) Original Spanish title Nos veíamos mejor en la oscuridad (2022)
- A Revolver to Carry at Night (2019; English edition 2024)
- Roses from Stalin (2015)
- Valya's Night (2013)
- The Silent Woman (2013, Feminist Press, ISBN 9781558618411) Original Czech title Tichá žena
- Fresh Mint with Lemon (2013, Open Road) (Original Czech version Peppermint Frappé, 2002)
- Goya's Glass (2012, Feminist Press, ISBN 9781558617971)
- Absent Moon (2010)
- Winter Garden (2009)
- The Good Soldier Švejk (a play; 2005)

== Awards and honors ==
- Finalist for The Great Literary Thursday Award (Velký knižní čtvrtek) for We Saw Each Other Better in the Darkness (Potmě jsme se viděli lépe), Czech Republic 2022
- Notable Translated Book of the Year by World Literature Today for Dressed for a Dance in the Snow, 2020
- Booksellers recommend (Los libreros recomiendan) for A Revolver For Going Out At Night With, Spain 2019
- Cálamo award, Book of the Year for Dressed for a Dance in the Snow (Vestidas para un baile en la nieve), Spain 2017
- Amat-Piniella award, for Valya's Night, Spain 2014
- Angel Crespo award, for the translation of Jaroslav Hašek's Las aventuras del buen soldado Švejk, Spain 2010
- Mercè Rodoreda award for Absent Moon (Contes de la lluna absent), Spain 2009
- Finalist for Premio Nacional de la Crítica for The Silent Woman (La mujer silenciosa), Spain 2005
- Gratias Agit award, for her global work, Czech Republic 2004
- Ciutat de Barcelona award, for the translation of Jaroslav Hašek's Les aventures del bon soldat Švejk, Spain 1995
- European Award for Translation of Václav Havel's Letters to Olga, 1994
