= Maria Mercè Roca =

Spanish writer and politician

Maria Mercè Roca i Perich
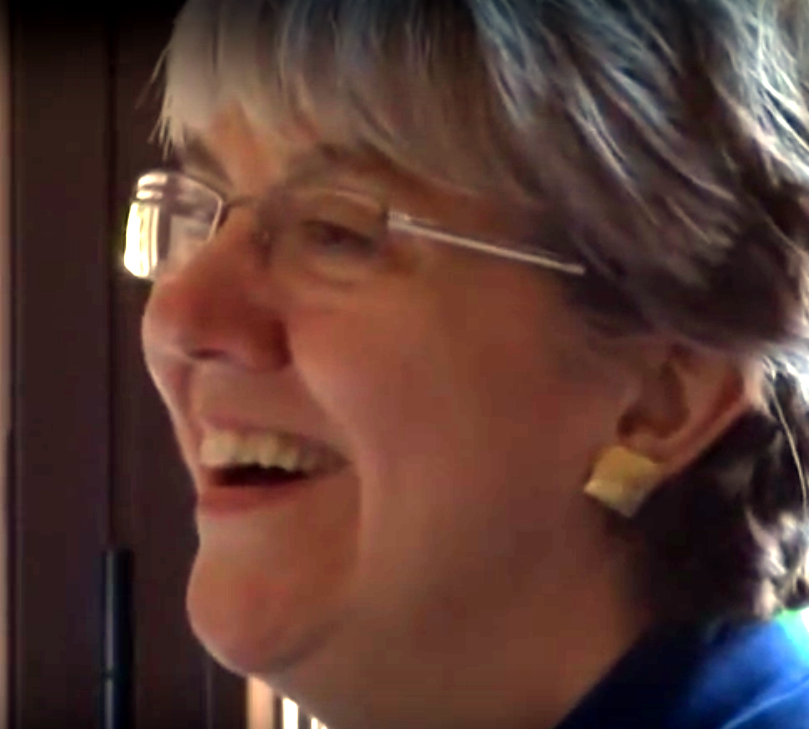
- in 2012
- Born: Maria Mercè Roca i Perich; July 19, 1958 (age 67) Portbou, Spain
- Occupation: Writer

Maria Mercè Roca i Perich (b. Portbou, Spain, July 19, 1958) is a Catalan writer and politician from Spain. She was deputy to the Parliament of Catalonia for Republican Left of Catalonia, and currently serves as a councillor at the City Council of Girona for the same party.

== Biography ==
At age 16, Roca moved to Girona, where she ended up establishing her residence. Although she did not finish her studies on Catalan Philology, she worked for many years as a Catalan teacher. In the mid-1980s, she rose in the Catalan cultural panorama when she was awarded the Víctor Català prize. She continued her literary activity with a number of tales, novels and also a script for the TV series Secrets de família, broadcast by TV3. Her career has always had a lot of success, both with literary prizes and translations into several languages, including Spanish, Basque, French, German and Dutch.

Roca is vice-president of the Associació d'Escriptors en Llengua Catalana.

She is always been active in politics –she was deputy at the Parliament of Catalonia, where she was President of the Culture Commission (2007-2010)– for Republican Left of Catalonia (ERC) party between 2003 and 2010.

She was a candidate to the City council of Girona for (ERC) at the 2015 Spanish municipal elections, where ERC got 4 councillors, among which Roca was one of them.

Roca was one of the promoters of the platform Sobirania i Progrés. In 2022 she was appointed dean of the Institució de les Lletres Catalanes, a public body promoting catalan literature.

== Work ==
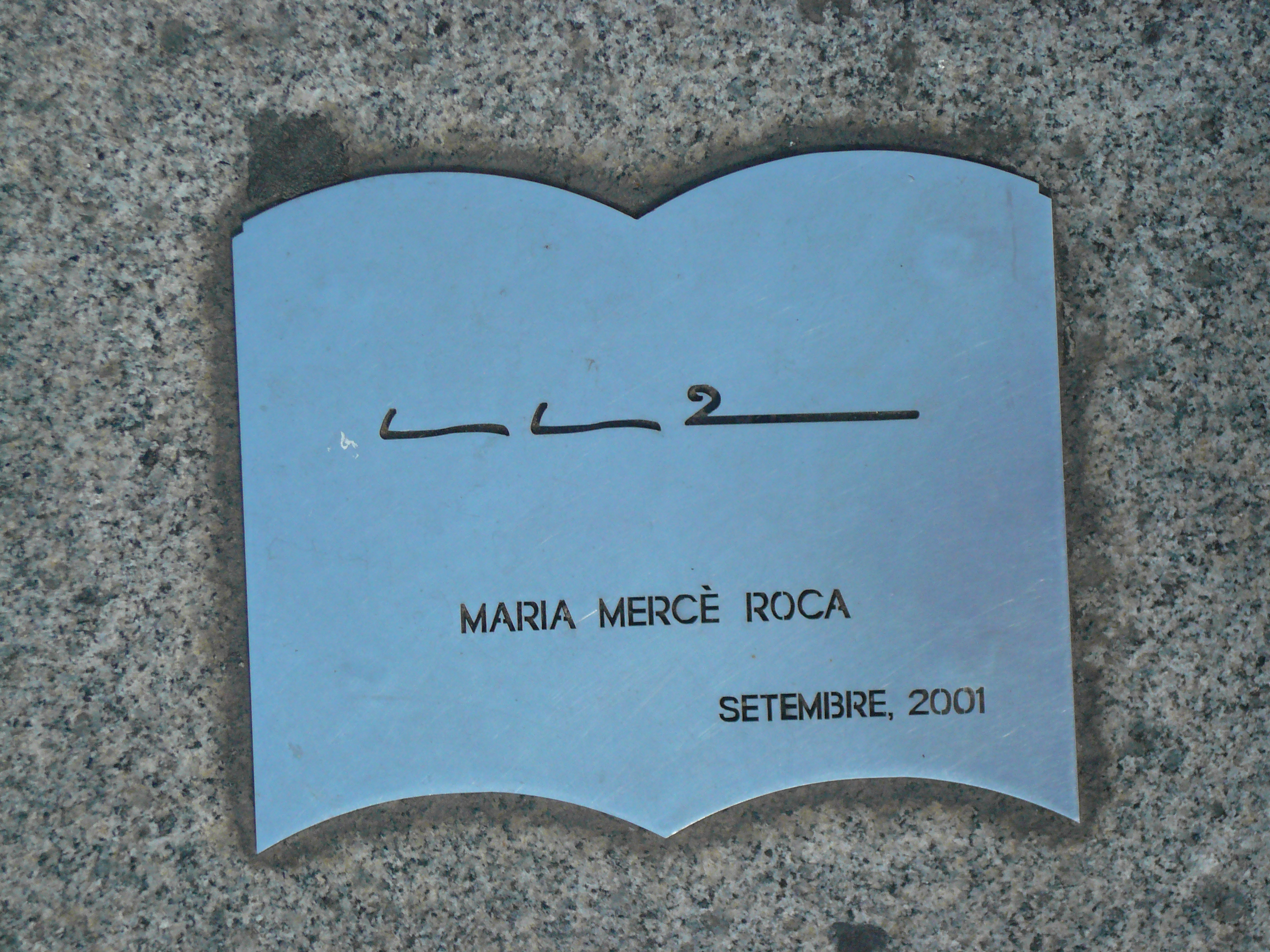
Plaque with Maria Mercè Roca's signatura, at the foot of the Monument to the Book in Barcelona

=== Short stories ===
- 1986 Ben Estret
- 1986 Sort que hi ha l'horitzó
- 1987 El col·leccionista de somnis
- 1988 La veu del foc
- 1988 Capitells
- 1994 L'escrivent i altres contes
- 2001 Contes personals: Tria a cura de Carles Cortès
- 2006 Kenitra

=== Novels ===
- 1987 Els arbres vençuts
- 1987 El present que m'acull
- 1988 Perfum de nard
- 1988 Com un miratge
- 1990 La casa gran
- 1990 Temporada baixa
- 1992 Greuges infinits
- 1993 Cames de seda
- 1998 L'àngel del vespre
- 1999 Temps de perdre
- 2000 Delictes d'amor
- 2002 Una mare com tu
- 2003 L'últim tren
- 2005 Els dies difícils
- 2011 Bones Intencions

=== Non-fiction ===
- 2001 El món era a fora (interviews)
- 2005 Coses que fan que la vida valgui la pena

== Prizes ==
- 1985 Víctor Català prize for Sort que hi ha l'horitzó
- 1986 Josep Pla Award for El present que m'acull
- 1992 Sant Jordi prize for Cames de seda
- 2000 Ramon Llull Novel Award for Delictes d'amor
- 2012 Barcanova prize for Mil revolts
