= Cabo San Roque =

Barcelona-based artistic duo working with sound, installation and performance

Cabosanroque is an artistic duo formed by Laia Torrents Carulla (Barcelona, 1976) and Roger Aixut Sampietro (Barcelona, 1975). Founded in Barcelona in 2001 as a musical collective and operating as a duo since 2012, their interdisciplinary practice centres on sound and its physical, performative and spatial dimensions. Their work moves between visual art, experimental music, installation and the performing arts, and is characterised by the use of mechanical devices, automated systems, objects and sound-generating technologies.

This movement between the stage, installation and visual art has remained a defining feature of their practice. Rather than adhering to a single format, their projects take different forms according to the ideas they explore, ranging from installations and sound sculptures to stage works, spatial interventions and participatory devices.

Throughout their career, Cabosanroque have investigated the relationships between sound, object, space and spectator. Their projects address subjects including error, memory, destruction, the relationship between nature and artifice, war, structures of power and collective creation. The Museo Nacional Centro de Arte Reina Sofía situates their practice around sound and its performative capacities, as well as the questioning of exhibition spaces, their formats and the position of the audience.

Their work has been presented internationally at institutions and contexts including the Centre Pompidou and the Cité de l'Architecture in Paris, the Centre for Contemporary Arts, Glasgow, the Centre de Cultura Contemporània de Barcelona (CCCB), the Fonoteca Nacional de México, La Casa Encendida in Madrid, Schaubude Berlin and Théâtre Garonne in Toulouse, as well as at festivals including Sónar, Grec Festival, Temporada Alta and Manifesta.

== History ==
Cabosanroque was founded in Barcelona in 2001 as a musical collective, described by critic and curator Arnau Horta as an "orchestra of experimental anarcho-lutherie". The project initially brought together musicians from both academic and self-taught backgrounds and was based, among other premises, on the idea that none of its members should play the instrument they had mastered, encouraging intuitive forms of composition and improvisation.

During its early years, the collective grew to as many as nine members. Its members included Laia Torrents, Roger Aixut, Pepe Seguí, Ramon Garriga, Alberto Mezquíriz, Núria Carrera, Carles Martínez-Almoyna and Oriol Luna.

The number of members gradually decreased until the project assumed its current form as a duo. This process coincided with a diversification of methodologies and languages: although music and sound continued to provide a common thread, the project increasingly incorporated poetry, object theatre, performance, literature and other areas of artistic practice.

From the outset, Cabosanroque built instruments from found objects and materials. Horta has associated this early period with the influence of Alfred Jarry's pataphysics and a playful, absurdist form of engineering, with machines made from washing machines, sewing machines, obsolete telephones, electromechanical toys and other discarded everyday objects. This machine-based practice preceded their later expansion into automation, installation and visual art. The collective's name derives from one of these early instruments, built by Aixut from a trunk found in the street that still bore a label from the transatlantic liner Cabo San Roque, which travelled between Montevideo and Barcelona.

Their experimentation with self-built instruments gradually led to automation and the development of musical machines. Early stage projects included La Caixeta, Música a màquina and Torn de nit. For the latter, they repurposed components from an industrial biscuit-production line in Granollers to build the Orquestra Mecànica de la França Xica, composed of pistons, solenoid valves, pulleys, motors and conveyor belts.

During this period, the project gradually shifted from the concert format towards the performing arts, sound installation and the construction of autonomous devices. In 2012, Cabosanroque became a duo formed by Torrents and Aixut.

In 2010, an encounter with Carles Santos during the Procesión del Silencio in Murcia initiated a collaboration that resulted in Maquinofòbiapianolera, a project in which Santos's piano was set against the mechanical orchestra designed by Torrents, Aixut and Pepe Seguí.

At the 2012 Grec Festival, they presented El run-run del nyigo-nyigo, extending the collaboration with the Orquestra Mecànica de la França Xica to Pascal Comelade, Pierre Bastien and Joan Saura.

That same year, they undertook a residency at the Fonoteca Nacional de México, where they produced Los árboles aullaron, a mechanical sound installation constructed from objects and materials collected in markets, factories and other locations in Mexico.

In 2015, Arts Santa Mònica in Barcelona presented the retrospective La cobla patafísica 2015–2001, curated by Moisés Puente, bringing together machines, instruments and installations produced during the project's first fourteen years. The exhibition was accompanied by the first monograph devoted to Cabosanroque.

Cabosanroque have been resident artists at the Fundació Lluís Coromina since 2015.

== Artistic practice ==
Cabosanroque's practice approaches sound not only as musical material but also as a physical, spatial and performative phenomenon. Their installations combine sculpture, objects, motors, mechanical and pneumatic systems, automation, electronics, light and software.

Torrents's background in music and industrial engineering and Aixut's training in architecture inform a methodology in which conceptual research and technical experimentation develop in parallel. Technology is used as a tool for constructing the specific systems required by each project.

The physical generation of sound is a constant throughout their work. Automation, which initially arose from the need to mechanically reproduce particular musical actions, eventually became one of the central languages of their practice.

Another recurring element is the relationship between artwork and spectator. Many of their installations dispense with performers and position the audience within the device itself, altering conventions associated with both the theatrical stage and the exhibition space. The spectator's movement, the visible or invisible source of sound, and tensions between auditory and visual perception form part of the dramaturgy of the works.

The coexistence of installation, performance, music and the performing arts has continued following their transition from musical collective to artistic duo. Their projects can be presented in museums and art centres, theatres, music festivals, public spaces and biennials, and frequently transfer devices and strategies associated with one of these contexts into another.

This deliberately undisciplined condition can be understood as an expanded-field practice: sound does not function as a closed disciplinary category but as one of the means through which the works establish relationships with architecture, time, the body and the spectator's imagination. This openness also accounts for their circulation between contemporary art museums, theatres, music festivals, archives, sound archives and literary contexts.

Since the mid-2010s, their practice has also intensified its engagement with literature. Between 2016 and 2023, they developed a trilogy of stage installations based on works by Joan Brossa, Jacint Verdaguer and Mercè Rodoreda. This line of work subsequently continued through projects connected to Pedro Calderón de la Barca, the figure of Don Juan and Blai Bonet.

Error is another recurring concept in their work. The duo use failure, deviation and the interruption of normative systems as compositional materials and as mechanisms for questioning cultural and social structures. This investigation is particularly evident in Sous les violons, la plage!, Estadi and Fail Louder.

== Works and projects ==
=== La Caixeta — 2006 ===
One of Cabosanroque's early stage projects, based on self-built instruments and mechanisms. It was presented at contexts including the Grec Festival in Barcelona, Robodock in Amsterdam and the Incanti festival in Turin.

=== Música a màquina — 2006–2007 ===
A stage and musical project centred on a washing machine. It was presented at Barcelona's Festival NEO and subsequently in other international contexts, including the Frankfurt Book Fair and Sónar.

=== Torn de nit — 2009 ===
A project constructed from components recovered from an industrial biscuit-production line in Granollers. Cabosanroque transformed pistons, solenoid valves, pulleys, motors and conveyor belts into the Orquestra Mecànica de la França Xica.

Torn de nit was co-produced by Cabosanroque, Centro Párraga and Temporada Alta and was subsequently presented at Mercat de les Flors.

=== Bestiari — 2011 ===
A performance built around an orchestra of mechanical animals made from everyday objects, motors and repurposed mechanisms. The project reinterpreted texts from bestiaries of different periods and cultures.

It was presented at Fira Mediterrània de Manresa and received first prize in the Innovació i Cultura Popular programme of the Fundació Jaume Casademont.

=== Los árboles aullaron — 2012 ===
A mechanical and automated sound installation produced during a residency at the Fonoteca Nacional de México. Constructed from bottles, pots, tubes, metal components and other materials found in Mexican markets, factories and urban spaces, it took the form of mechanical vegetation capable of producing sound through pneumatic and electromagnetic mechanisms. The installation was presented at the Fonoteca Nacional in 2012 and later at Vive Latino.

=== El run-run del nyigo-nyigo — 2012 ===
A project developed from the Orquestra Mecànica de la França Xica with compositions and interventions by Carles Santos, Pascal Comelade, Pierre Bastien and Joan Saura. It was co-produced by Le Lieu Unique in Nantes and the Grec Festival.

=== Maquinofòbiapianolera — 2012–2013 ===
A project made with Carles Santos that set the piano as a historical acoustic machine against Cabosanroque's mechanical and automated orchestra. The work toured internationally and was presented, among other venues, at the Teatro de la Ciudad Esperanza Iris in Mexico City in 2013.

=== La cobla patafísica 2001 — 2015 ===
A retrospective exhibition presented at Arts Santa Mònica in Barcelona, bringing together instruments, machines and installations produced since the collective's foundation. The programme included interventions and concerts with Pierre Bastien, Carles Santos, Pascal Comelade and Truna, among other collaborators. The exhibition led to the first monograph devoted to Cabosanroque.

=== No em va fer Joan Brossa — 2016 ===
The first part of the trilogy of stage installations dedicated to Catalan writers. Based on Joan Brossa's early work and stage poetry, it uses everyday objects, automated systems, sound and movement without the conventional presence of actors or puppeteers. It was co-produced by Cabosanroque, the Teatre Nacional de Catalunya, Temporada Alta, the Institució de les Lletres Catalanes, Fundació Joan Brossa and Fundació Lluís Coromina, and subsequently toured several European venues as well as Hospicio Cabañas during the Guadalajara International Book Fair in Mexico.

=== Ursonate Karaoke — 2017 ===
A light and sound installation inspired by Kurt Schwitters's Ursonate. The work emerged from Cabosanroque's research into the generation of sound from different light sources. Electromagnetic interference produced by neon lights, fluorescent tubes, incandescent lamps and electric motors generates live sounds that replace the phonetics and dynamics of Schwitters's recording. Using the formal structure of karaoke, the installation associates motifs from the sonata with the visual imagery of the format and invites visitors to perform the work through a microphone. It was presented at the Faculty of Fine Arts in Barcelona and at La Casa Encendida in Madrid as part of the IN-SONORA festival.

=== Sous les violons, la plage! — 2018 ===
An interactive installation inspired by the May 68 slogan "Sous les pavés, la plage!". Visitors throw stones at the instruments of a suspended string quartet while a computer system modifies a composition based on a quartet by Joseph Haydn according to the impacts. The physical destruction of the instruments simultaneously produces a collective composition that differs with each activation.

=== RRR — 2019 ===
A three-way stage collaboration with painter Frederic Amat and dance company La Veronal. It was presented at Teatre Lliure and the Temporada Alta festival.

=== Dimonis — 2019 ===
The second part of the literary trilogy, premiered at Temporada Alta. The work draws on notebooks in which Jacint Verdaguer recorded testimonies from exorcism sessions he attended in Barcelona between 1890 and 1893. Cabosanroque reconstruct a domestic space using mechanisms, video, sound and electromagnetic devices. The installation included recorded contributions by Niño de Elche, Rocío Molina and poets Enric Casasses and Núria Martínez Vernis, among others. It subsequently toured to La Filature in Mulhouse, Théâtre Garonne in Toulouse, the CCCB and the Theater der Dinge festival produced by Schaubude in Berlin, as well as Hospicio Cabañas during the Guadalajara International Book Fair in Mexico.

=== Un nombre — 2019 ===
A collaboration with Perejaume and the Fundació Pere Mitjans. A 29-metre signature composed of interconnected signatures by users with different functional diversities was transformed into a player-piano score.

=== Mis en place d’un lieu — 2020 ===
Exhibition design and curatorial project involving the Centre Pompidou's collection of models and watercolours by the architecture studio RCR Arquitectes.

=== Petrotuning — 2021 ===
A sound installation developed for the exhibition Petromasculinitats at Bòlit, Centre d'Art Contemporani in Girona, curated by Arnau Horta. The work takes as its starting point the historical relationship between Auto-Tune developer Andy Hildebrand and geophysical prospecting techniques used by the oil industry. From this genealogy, Cabosanroque connect processed voice, contemporary music culture, oil extraction and the concept of petromasculinity. In 2022, the work was acquired by the Col·lecció Nacional d'Art Contemporani de Catalunya and deposited at the Museu d'Art de Girona. Different performance activations of the work have involved Torrents, Aixut and Niño de Elche.

=== Serres — 2022 ===
A light and sound installation presented at Llum BCN. It constructs a moving translucent topography set against an orthogonal grid of light, creating a tension between natural landscape and artificial construction. A new version adapted to an interior space was presented at Disseny Hub Barcelona during Llum BCN 2026.

=== Flors i viatges — 2022 ===
The third part of the trilogy. Premiered at Temporada Alta in 2022, it draws on Mercè Rodoreda's Viatges i flors and texts by Svetlana Alexievich to address war and its effects on civilian populations, particularly through women's voices. The installation constructs a landscape somewhere between a garden and a forest using flowers, trees, water, stones, ceramics, mechanisms and sound, and incorporates documentary recordings and testimonies by women displaced by armed conflicts. It again features recorded collaborations with Rocío Molina and Núria Martínez Vernis, as well as singer Núria Graham. It was subsequently presented at Naves del Español at Matadero Madrid, the Teatre Nacional de Catalunya and the CCCB as part of the Grec Festival, as well as Hospicio Cabañas during the Guadalajara International Book Fair in Mexico.

=== Site Unspecific — 2023–2025 ===
A series of sound works conceived for CaixaForum+ that transfers the format of the museum audio guide outside the museum. The works are designed to be listened to individually in archetypal spaces such as a supermarket, cemetery, forest, bar, church, city or the listener's own home. The project combines works by Cabosanroque with collaborations by El Conde de Torrefiel, Alberto Conejero and Isa Campo, alongside related works involving Graciela Iturbide, Niño de Elche and Perejaume.

=== 22 Forats per fer un Rèquiem — 2024 ===
An installation presented at Bòlit, Centre d'Art Contemporani in Girona, based on research into Spanish Civil War graves in the province of Girona and the transfer of human remains to the Valle de los Caídos in 1959. The project took as its starting point Joan Pla's article La memòria soterrada de la Guerra Civil, published in the Revista de Girona, and was developed with the collaboration of the Memorial Democràtic on the documentary research.

=== Playback — 2024 ===
A performance presented at the Fundació Tàpies as part of the series Les càries de Tàpies. The performance explored the friction and contradiction between sound produced live with a group of chairs and recorded sound emitted by the same chairs.

=== Politonos — 2024 ===
An installation created for Fundación Telefónica's exhibition Miradas que comunican, marking the company's centenary. Cabosanroque used approximately 250 historical telephone handsets to construct a sound and light topography. The work takes polyphonic ringtones as one of the earliest forms of personalised telephone sound and turns the handsets into elements of a collective composition.

=== El castor que lloraba — 2024 ===
A stage project co-produced by Cabosanroque, the Compañía Nacional de Teatro Clásico and the Temporada Alta festival. It premiered at the Sala Tirso de Molina of Madrid's Teatro de la Comedia on 31 October 2024. Conceived as a contemporary dialogue with Pedro Calderón de la Barca's El gran teatro del mundo, it addresses relationships between nature and artifice through soundscape, hidden mechanisms, objects and dramaturgy.

=== Trànsit — 2025 ===
An audiovisual installation made with Studio Animal for Llum BCN 2025. The work transforms 49 suspended traffic lights into a structure of light and sound, removing their usual traffic-regulation function and using their signals as compositional material. It has also been presented at Matadero during the Luz Madrid festival and at the Norderzoon festival in Groningen.

=== Estadi — 2025 ===
An installation made with Flexo Arquitectura for the exhibition Citissimum Altissimum Fortissimum at Arts Santa Mònica. The work transforms elements associated with competitive sport — goals, baskets, stands and playing fields — by altering their proportions and mechanisms. Its sound devices are activated by participants' errors rather than by successful attempts.

=== Mil tres, say cheese — 2026 ===
An experimental opera created and directed by Cabosanroque and premiered at Teatre Lliure in Barcelona's Gràcia district in April 2026. The work revisits the myth of Don Juan and its reformulation in Mozart's Don Giovanni from a contemporary perspective. It shifts the focus towards the female figures and combines music, gesture, spoken language, audiovisual devices and performance. Six female performers from different musical disciplines appear on stage. The work also exemplifies the continuity between installation, sound experimentation and stage practice that characterises Cabosanroque's work.

=== Un murmullo que siempre estuvo ahí — 2026 ===
A sound work produced for Museo Aural, a Museo Nacional Centro de Arte Reina Sofía project exploring the audio guide as an artistic format. The piece leads visitors through different points in the Sabatini building and constructs a fiction around supposed earlier interventions by Cabosanroque whose only traces are certain architectural elements and sound recordings. The text was written in collaboration with art critic María Muñoz, and the work features Niño de Elche.

=== A happy Day — 2026 ===
A performance created by Cabosanroque and Estudio Cube specifically for the opening ceremony of the UIA World Congress of Architects 2026 Barcelona, held on 28 June on the esplanade of the Three Chimneys in Sant Adrià de Besòs. Over thirty minutes, six crane operators performed a choreography with construction machinery exploring relationships between scale, material, technique and gesture, as well as between humans and machines, while questioning the role architecture and engineering works have played in the current climate crisis. The intervention culminated with one of the cranes uncorking a bottle of cava and serving a glass to the president of the International Union of Architects. The ceremony brought together more than 5,000 attendees from over 130 countries.

=== On els mals camins se perden — 2026 ===
An installation created as part of Any Blai Bonet, marking the centenary of the Mallorcan writer's birth. The work explores the concept of freedom in Bonet's writing through excerpts from the diaries Els ulls and La mirada, the poetry collections Comèdia and Els Fets, and the novel El mar. The installation opened on 19 July 2026 at Casa Blai Bonet. Centre de poesia in Santanyí and later travelled to the Museu del Calçat i de la Indústria in Inca.

=== Fail Louder — 2026 ===
Estadi, created with Flexo Arquitectura. Installation view at Arts Santa Mònica, 2025. Photo: Jordi Play

An installation developed for Manifesta 16 Ruhr with Flexo Arquitectura and presented in the former St. Ludgerus church in Bochum. The project continues the investigation initiated in Estadi. Modified goals and basketball hoops are connected to sound systems, including the former church organ, which react to participants' failures while successful attempts remain silent. The installation thus transforms the competitive logic of sport, turning error into a generator of sound and collective action.

== Collections ==
- Col·lecció Nacional d'Art Contemporani de Catalunya — Petrotuning (2021), acquired in 2022 and deposited at the Museu d'Art de Girona.

== Critical reception ==
Cabosanroque's evolution from musical experimentation and instrument building towards a practice moving between installation, visual art, music and performance has attracted critical attention in Spain and elsewhere in Europe and Latin America.

In Mexico, La Jornada documented their use of self-built instruments and everyday objects as early as 2009. In 2013, the same newspaper covered Maquinofòbiapianolera, their collaboration with Carles Santos at the Teatro de la Ciudad Esperanza Iris, highlighting the confrontation between the piano as a historical acoustic machine and the mechanical and technological devices developed by Cabosanroque.

In Germany, Der Tagesspiegel reviewed No em va fer Joan Brossa during its 2018 presentation at Schaubude Berlin, while rbb24 covered Dimonis in 2024 as part of the Theater der Dinge festival.

In France, L'Alsace highlighted the electroacoustic composition, spatialisation of sound and visual dimension of the devices in Dimonis. In 2025, Mouvement published a profile of Cabosanroque on the occasion of their appearance at Théâtre Garonne in Toulouse, situating their trajectory between experimental music and visual art and discussing Petrotuning and Flors i viatges in particular.

In Spain, El País has covered different stages of their career and projects including Sous les violons, la plage!, Petrotuning and Flors i viatges. Cultural publications have also addressed the trilogy devoted to Brossa, Verdaguer and Rodoreda and the gradual expansion of Cabosanroque's practice towards installation and visual art. Ara, for example, discussed No em va fer Joan Brossa as a work bringing together poetry, soundscape, objects, movement and spatial experience.

In 2026, NEO2 published the interview El sonido como dispositivo. Entrevistamos a Cabosanroque, focusing on their evolution from improvisation and instrument building to sound installation and on recurring concepts in their work including error, automation, perception, memory, technology and spectator participation.

That same year, Mil tres, say cheese received attention from theatre critics. La Vanguardia and Ara discussed its contemporary reworking of the Don Juan myth and its combination of music, performance, image and sound experimentation.

The presentation of Fail Louder at Manifesta 16 Ruhr significantly broadened the duo's international critical reception. The British magazine Frieze highlighted the transformation of St. Ludgerus into a sports court in which failure generates sound through backboards and goals connected to the church organ.

The Guardian likewise noted the transformation of the church into a sports space and the simultaneous participation of biennial visitors and local young people. In France, Le Monde included the installation among the notable interventions at Manifesta 16.

In Germany, Welt, Kulturraum NRW and the Deutsches Architekt:innenblatt also discussed the work in the context of the reuse of religious buildings in the Ruhr region during Manifesta 16.

The group had already received English-language media attention during its earlier musical period, including a profile by PRI's The World.

== Selected exhibitions and presentations ==
- Grec Festival, Barcelona — 2006 and later editions
- Casa del Lago, Mexico City — 2006, 2009
- Frankfurt Book Fair — 2007
- Temporada Alta, Girona — since 2009
- Fonoteca Nacional de México, Mexico City — 2012
- Teatro de la Ciudad Esperanza Iris, Mexico City — 2013
- Arts Santa Mònica, Barcelona — 2015, 2021, 2025
- La Casa Encendida, Madrid — 2018
- Schaubude Berlin / Theater der Dinge, Berlin — 2018, 2024
- La Filature, Mulhouse — 2019
- Centre for Contemporary Arts, Glasgow — 2019
- Théâtre Garonne, Toulouse — 2019, 2020, 2024, 2025
- Centre Georges Pompidou, Paris — 2020–2021
- Cité de l'Architecture, Paris — 2021
- Bòlit, Centre d'Art Contemporani, Girona — 2021, 2024
- Llum BCN, Barcelona — 2022, 2025, 2026
- Naves del Español / Matadero Madrid — 2023
- CCCB, Barcelona — 2023
- Teatre Nacional de Catalunya, Barcelona — 2008, 2016, 2023
- Fundación Telefónica, Madrid — 2024
- Compañía Nacional de Teatro Clásico / Teatro de la Comedia, Madrid — 2024
- Teatre Lliure, Barcelona — 2026
- Museo Nacional Centro de Arte Reina Sofía, Madrid — 2026
- UIA World Congress of Architects, Barcelona / Sant Adrià de Besòs — 2026
- Casa Blai Bonet, Santanyí — 2026
- Museu del Calçat i de la Indústria, Inca — 2026
- Manifesta 16 Ruhr, Bochum — 2026

== Publications ==
- CaboSanRoque. La cobla patafísica 2015–2001 (2015). The first monograph devoted to the project, published in conjunction with the exhibition of the same title at Arts Santa Mònica. Edited by Moisés Puente and published by Fabulatorio and Arts Santa Mònica, it includes photographs by Inga Knölke, texts by Moisés Puente, Víctor Nubla and Pablo Martín Sánchez, and an interview by Pierre Bastien. ISBN 978-84-940115-4-2.

== Discography ==
Cabosanroque's recorded output belongs primarily to the project's earlier period as a musical collective.

- CaboSanRoque — G3G Records, 2003.
- Membrillo EP. CaboSanRoque vs Luciano — Bruchstuecke, 2003.
- França Xica — G3G Records, 2005.
- Música a màquina — 2007.
- Ball de Pistons — 2010.
- Maquinofòbiapianolera, with Carles Santos — 2012–2013.
- 12 Rounds — Chesapik, 2014.
