= Renée Vivien =

British poet who wrote in the French language

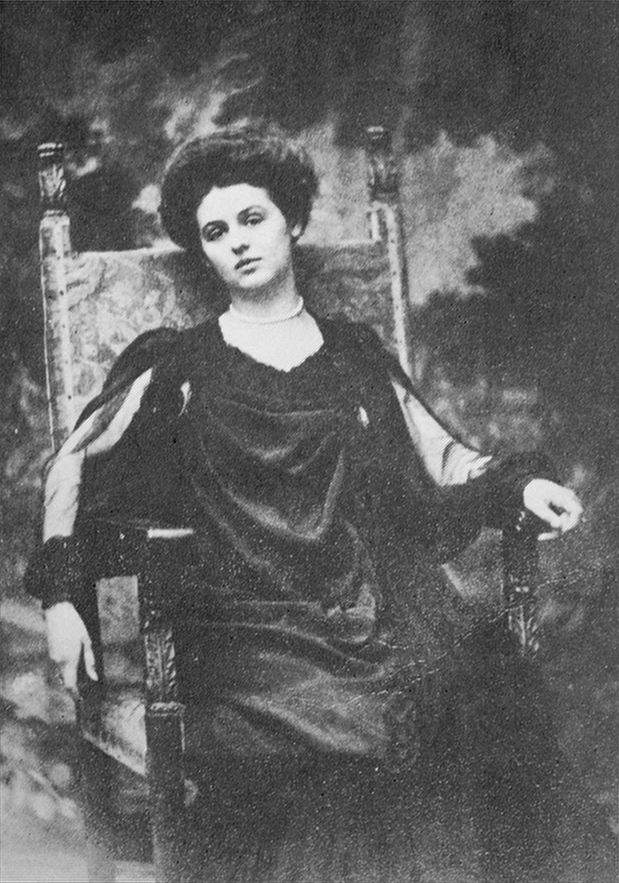
- Renée Vivien, circa 1905
- Born: Pauline Mary Tarn; 11 June 1877; London, United Kingdom
- Died: 18 November 1909 (aged 32); Paris, France
- Resting place: Passy Cemetery, Paris, France
- Monuments: Place Renée Vivien, Paris, France
- Occupation: Poet
- Era: Belle Epoque
- Partner(s): Natalie Barney (1900–1901); Hélène van Zuylen (1902–1907)

Signature
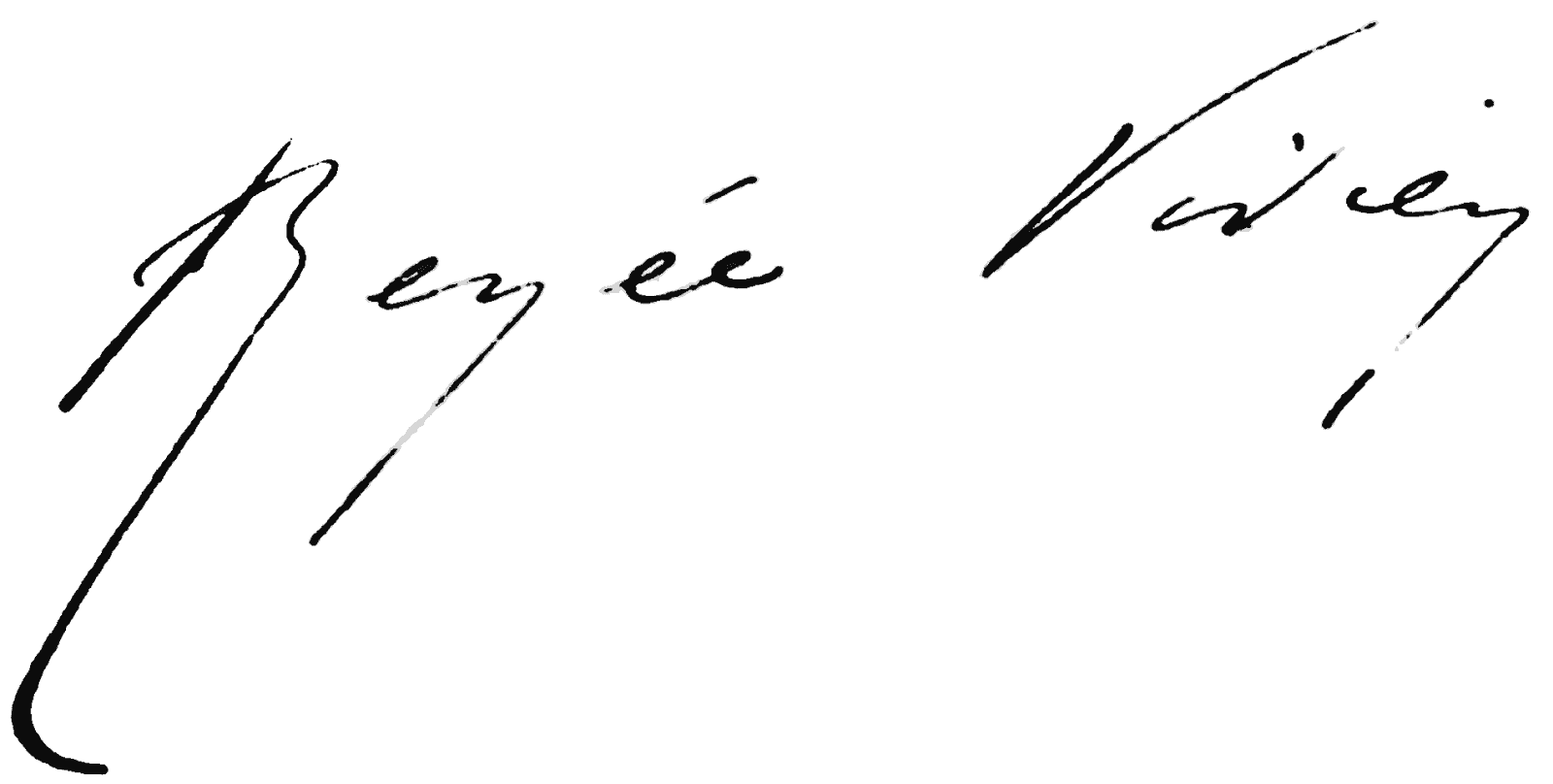

Renée Vivien (born Pauline Mary Tarn; 11 June 1877 – 18 November 1909) was a British poet who wrote in the French language. A high-profile lesbian writer in Paris during the Belle Époque era, she is widely considered to be one of the first noteworthy lesbian poets of the twentieth century. Her work has recently received more attention due to a revival of interest in Sapphic verse. Many of her poems are autobiographical, pertaining mostly to Baudelarian themes of extreme romanticism and frequent despair. Apart from poetry, she wrote several works of prose, including L'Etre Double (inspired by Coleridge's Christabel), and an unfinished biography of Anne Boleyn, which was published posthumously. She has also been the subject of multiple biographies, most notably those by Jean-Paul Goujon, André Germain, and Yves-Gerard Le Dantec. A novel based on her life was written by the Catalan poet Maria Mercè Marçal in 1994, and translated into English in 2020 as The Passion according to Renée Vivien.

== Biography ==
=== Early life ===
Renée Vivien was born Pauline Mary Tarn in London, England to John Tarn, a British farmer who had become wealthy through property investments, and an American mother, Mary Gilett Bennett. Pauline attended the Belsize College in Hampstead, London, where, in 1883, she was awarded a silver medal by the Alliance française for her study of French. While she was attending school in Paris, her father died in 1886. Upon his death, Pauline returned to London to receive her inheritance from him. Purportedly, Pauline's mother attempted to declare her legally insane so that she could have her husband's inheritance money instead. The plot failed, and Pauline was taken away from her mother to live as a ward of the court until she came of age. In 1899, after she turned 21, Pauline returned to France with the inheritance money. It is around this time that she began to go by the name of Renée Vivien.

=== Relationships ===
Vivien harbored an unconsummated romantic relationship with her childhood friend and neighbor, Violet Shillito, who is thought to be referenced in Vivien’s poems with the words “violet” and “purple.” After Shillito’s death to typhoid fever, Vivien felt a sense of guilt for her relationship with American heiress Natalie Barney, who Shillito had introduced her to the year before, because she felt that she had sidelined Shillito in favour of Barney. Vivien’s feelings of guilt are thought to be a likely contributing factor—alongside Barney's infidelities—to the end of Vivien and Barney’s relationship in 1901.

Renée Vivien (left) and Natalie Clifford Barney posing for a portrait in Directoire-era costume

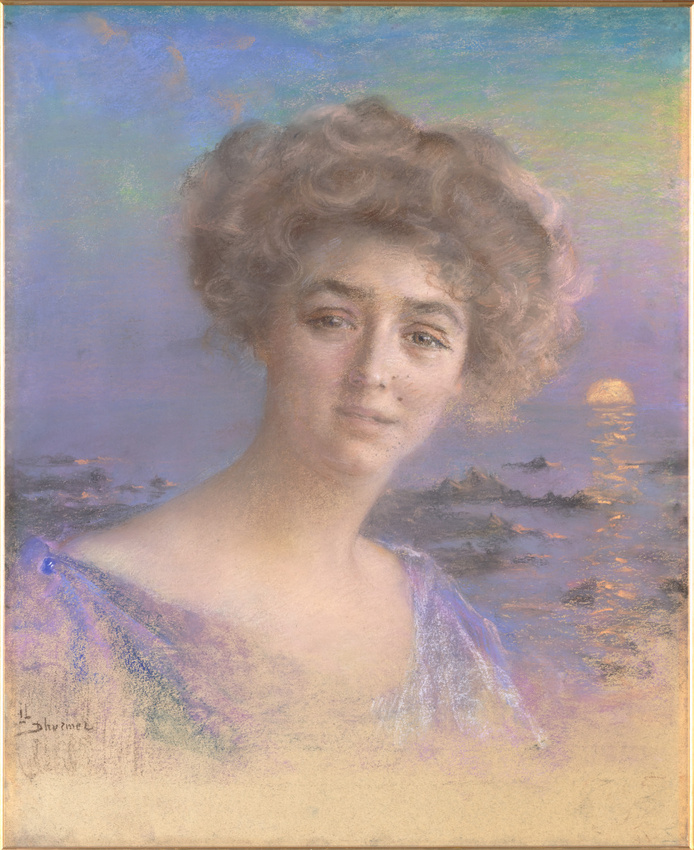
Lucien Lévy-Dhurmer (b. 1909), Portrait of Renée Vivien

In 1902, Vivien became romantically involved with the wealthy Baroness Hélène van Zuylen, one of the Paris Rothschilds. After her turbulent prior experience with Barney, Vivien found much-needed emotional support and stability in her relationship with Zuylen. In spite of Zuylen’s social position, which did not allow for a public relationship, the two continued a discreet affair for a number of years, often traveling together. In letters to her confidant, the French journalist and Classical scholar Jean Charles-Brun, Vivien wrote that she considered herself married to the Baroness.

While still with Zuylen, Vivien received a letter from Kérimé Turkhan Pacha, an admirer in Istanbul and the wife of a Turkish diplomat. The two launched a passionate correspondence, followed by brief clandestine encounters. Kérimé, though French-educated and cultivated, lived according to Islamic tradition, which meant an isolated and veiled life in which she could neither travel freely nor leave her husband. Meanwhile, Vivien continued her relationship with the Baroness de Zuylen.

In 1907, Zuylen left Vivien for another woman, which left her shocked and humiliated. Another blow came in 1908 when Kérimé, upon moving with her husband to Saint Petersburg, ended their affair.

Vivien, terribly affected by these losses, turned increasingly to alcohol and drugs. The French writer Colette, who was Vivien's neighbour from 1906 to 1908, immortalised this period in The Pure and the Impure, a collection of portraits showing the spectrum of homosexual behaviour. Written in the 1920s and originally published in 1932, its factual accuracy is questionable; Natalie Barney reportedly did not concur with Colette's characterization of Vivien.

=== World travels ===
Vivien was cultivated and very well travelled. She wintered in Egypt, visited China, and explored much of the Middle East, as well as Europe and the US.

After the heartbreak from Zuylen and Kérimé, Vivien fled to Japan and then Hawaii with her mother in 1907. Vivien became ill on the voyage.

Her Paris home was a luxurious ground-floor apartment at 23, avenue du Bois de Boulogne (now 23, Avenue Foch) that opened onto a Japanese garden. She purchased antique furnishings from London and exotic objets d'art from the Far East. She kept an abundant amount of fresh flowers and offerings of Lady Apples to her collection of shrines, statuettes, icons, and Buddhas.

A public square is named in her honor in Paris: Place Renée-Vivien, in Le Marais, central historic district of the French capital.

=== Illness and death ===
While visiting London in 1908, Vivien tried to kill herself by drinking an excess of laudanum. As she waited to die, she stretched out on her divan with a bouquet of violets held over her heart. She survived the attempt.

While in England, she contracted pleurisy and continued to grow weaker upon her eventual return to Paris. According to biographer Jean-Paul Goujon, Vivien suffered from chronic gastritis, due to years of chloral hydrate and alcohol abuse. She had also started to refuse to eat. By the summer of 1909, she walked with a cane.

Vivien died in Paris on the morning of 18 November 1909 at the age of 32; the cause of death was reported at the time as "lung congestion", but likely resulted from pneumonia complicated by alcoholism, drug abuse, and anorexia nervosa. She was interred at Passy Cemetery in the same Parisian neighbourhood where she had lived.

== Works ==
=== Published works ===
Vivien wrote exclusively in French. She published her first collection of poetry, Études et préludes, in 1901. She would go on to publish 12 more collections of poetry in her lifetime. Contemporary feminists consider her to be one of the first women to write openly lesbian poetry.

In 1903, Vivien produced a translation of Sappho's poetry from the edition of Hentry Thornton Wharton, entitled Sapho, traduction nouvelle avec le texte grec (Sapho: A New Translation with the Greek Text). ^{[p. 78]} She learned Greek by taking private lessons with a teacher, Gaetan Baron, because she wanted to read Homer in the original Greek. ^{[p. 93]} In 1904, Vivien published her autobiographical novel A Woman Appeared to Me. In 1976, the novel was translated to English by Jeanette Foster and published by Naiad Press. Naiad also published a translation of Vivien's poetry collection, The Muse of Violets, in 1977.

Vivien also published poetry and prose in collaboration with lover, Hélène van Zuylen using the pseudonym, Paule Riversdale. The true attribution of these works is uncertain, however; some scholars believe they were written solely by Vivien, as well as some other books published under Zuylen's name.

Title page for Vivien's biography of Anne Boleyn, published in 1909

During her brief life, Vivien was an extremely prolific poet who came to be known as the "Muse of the Violets", derived from her love of the flower. Her obsession with violets (as well as with the colour violet) was likely a reminder of her beloved childhood friend, Violet Shillito.

She took to heart all the mannerisms of Parnassianism and of Symbolism, as one of the last poets to claim allegiance to the school. Her compositions include sonnets, hendecasyllabic verse, and prose poetry.

Virtually all her verse is veiled autobiography written in the French language, most of which has never been translated into English. Her principal published books of verse are Cendres et Poussières (1902), La Vénus des aveugles (1903), A l'heure des mains jointes (1906), Flambeaux éteints (1907), Sillages (1908), Poèmes en Prose (1909), Dans un coin de violettes (1909), and Haillons (1910).

Her poetry has earned even greater attention with the contemporary rediscovery of the works of Sappho, bringing with it even more acclaim.

=== List of works ===
- Études et Préludes (in French). Paris: Alphonse Lemerre. 1901 – via Wikisource.; appearing under the name R. Vivien
- Cendres et Poussières (in French). Paris: Lemerre. 1902 – via Wikisource.
- Évocations (in French). Paris: Lemerre. 1903 – via Wikisource.
- Sapho (in French). Paris: Lemerre. 1903 – via Wikisource.
- Du Vert au Violet (in French). Paris: Lemerre. 1903 – via Wikisource.
- Une Femme m'apparut (in French). Paris: Lemerre. 1904 – via Wikisource.; Une femme m'apparut (nouvelle ed.). 1905 – via Wikisource.
- La Dame à la louve (in French). Paris: Lemerre. 1904 – via Wikisource..
- Les Kitharèdes (in French). Paris: Lemerre. 1904 – via Wikisource.
- La Vénus des Aveugles (in French). Paris: Lemerre. 1904 – via Wikisource.
- À l'heure des mains jointes (in French). 1906 – via Wikisource.
- Flambeaux éteints (in French). Edward Sansot & C^{ie}. 1907 – via Wikisource.
- Le Christ, Aphrodite et M. Pépin (in French). E. Sansot. 1907 – via Wikisource.
- Chansons pour mon ombre (in French). Paris: A. Lemerre. 1907. OCLC 776850126, 902991449 – via BnF – Site institutionnel; appearing under Pauline M. Tarn
- Plusieurs Proses ironiques et satiriques (in French). 1907.
- L'Album de Sylvestre (in French). Sansot. 1908 – via Wikisource.
- Sillages (in French). Sansot. 1908 – via Wikisource.

Note: Later books were published published posthumously.

- Poèmes (in French). Paris: Lemerre. 1909 – via Wikisource.
- Anne Boleyn File:Commons-logo.svg (PDF) (in French). Paris: Alphonse Lemerre. 1909 – via Wikimedia Commons.
- Poèmes en Prose (in French). Sansot. 1909 – via Wikisource.
- Dans un Coin de Violettes (in French). Sansot. 1910 – via Wikisource.
- Le Vent des vaisseaux (in French). Sansot. 1910 – via Wikisource.
- Hallions (in French). Sansot. 1910 – via Wikisource.

=== Collections ===
- Vivien, Renée (1975). Deforges, Régine (ed.). Femmes sans Tain: Poèmes [Women without Tain: Poems or Two-way Women: Poems] (in French). Illustrated by Irina Ionesco. Paris: SECLE. OCLC 461535380. (Note: Tain in this context refers to silvering. The dictionary definition of tain at Wiktionary contains informative French and English information.)

=== Works available in English translation ===
- A Crown of Violets. Translated by Pious, Samantha. Sequim, WA: Headmistress Press. 2015. ISBN 978-0-692-53691-9. OCLC 953040430.
- A Woman Appeared to me. Translated by Foster, Jeannette H. Tallahassee, FL: Naiad Press. 1982. OCLC 1036921036.
- A Woman Appeared to me. Translated by Stableford, Brian M. UK: Snuggly Books. 2019. OCLC 1134528100.
- At the Sweet Hour of Hand in Hand. Translated by Belgrade, Sandia. Weatherby Lake, MO: Naiad Press. 1979. ISBN 978-0-930044-11-4. OCLC 6086492.
- Vivien, Renée; Zuylen de Nyevelt, Hélène de (2019). Faustina and Other Stories. Translated by Stableford, Brian M. UK: Snuggly Book. ISBN 978-1-943813-85-8. OCLC 1081437683.
- Lilith's Legacy: Prose Poems and Short Stories. Translated by Stableford, Brian M. UK: Snuggly Books. 2018. ISBN 978-1-943813-63-6. OCLC 1054178318.
- Tentative Melodies. Translated by Brumby, Justin. USA: 96th of October. 2024. ISBN 979-8344542799.
- The Muse of the Violets: Poems. Bates City, MO: Naiad Press. 1977. ISBN 978-0-930044-07-7. OCLC 568761370 – via Internet Archive.
- The Woman of the Wolf and Other Stories. Translated by Jay, Karla; Klein, Yvonne M. London: Gallic Books. 2020. ISBN 978-1-913547-06-6. OCLC 1203946716.

== Gallery ==
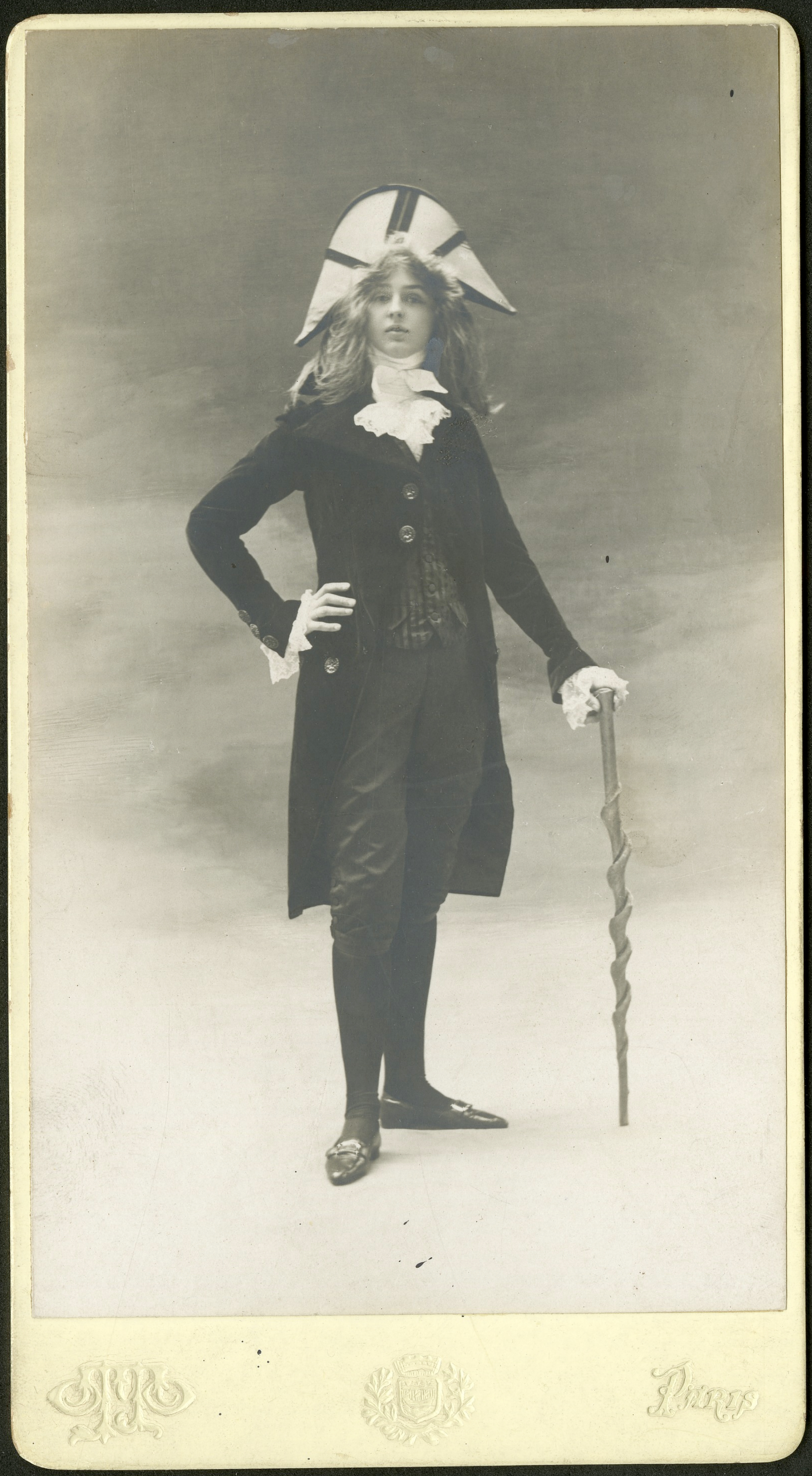
Otto Wegener circa 1900, portrait of Renée Vivien

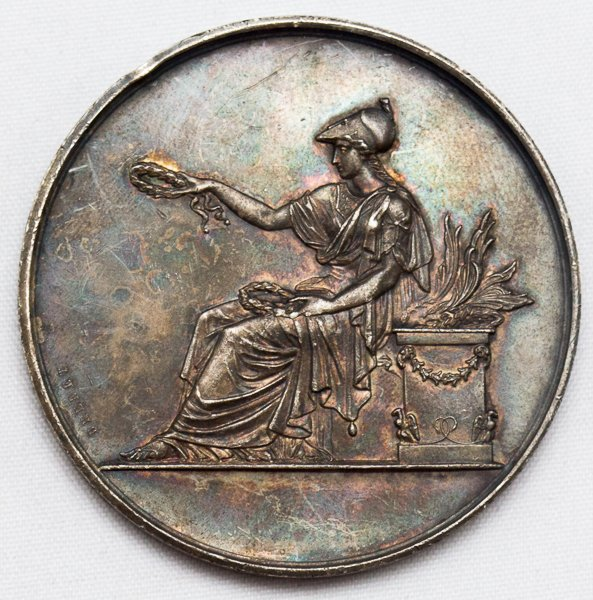
Nicolas-Guy-Antoine Brenet; 1883 Alliance française medal awarded to Pauline Tarn, obverse

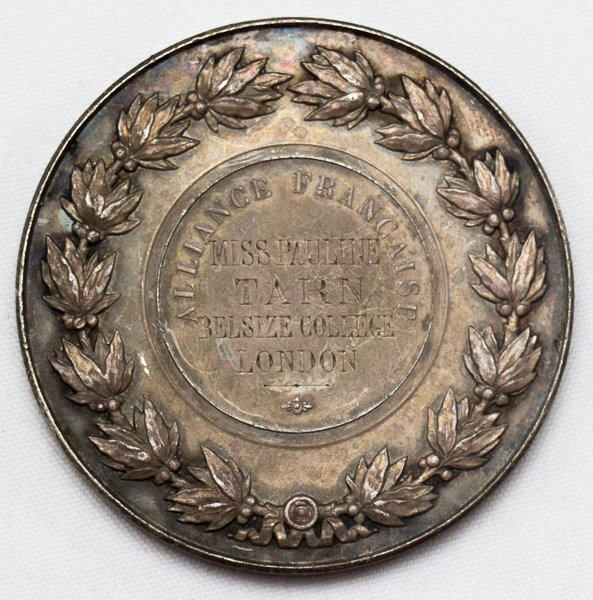
Reverse; inscription: ALLIANCE FRANCAISE
MISS PAULINE TARN BELSIZE COLLEGE LONDON

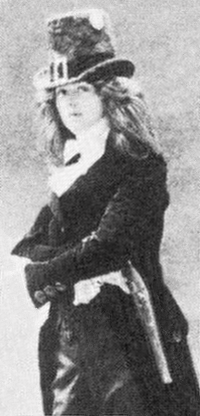
Renée Vivien

== See also ==
- List of poets portraying sexual relations between women
