= Ester Xargay Melero =

Spanish poet, writer, and videoartist (1960–2024)

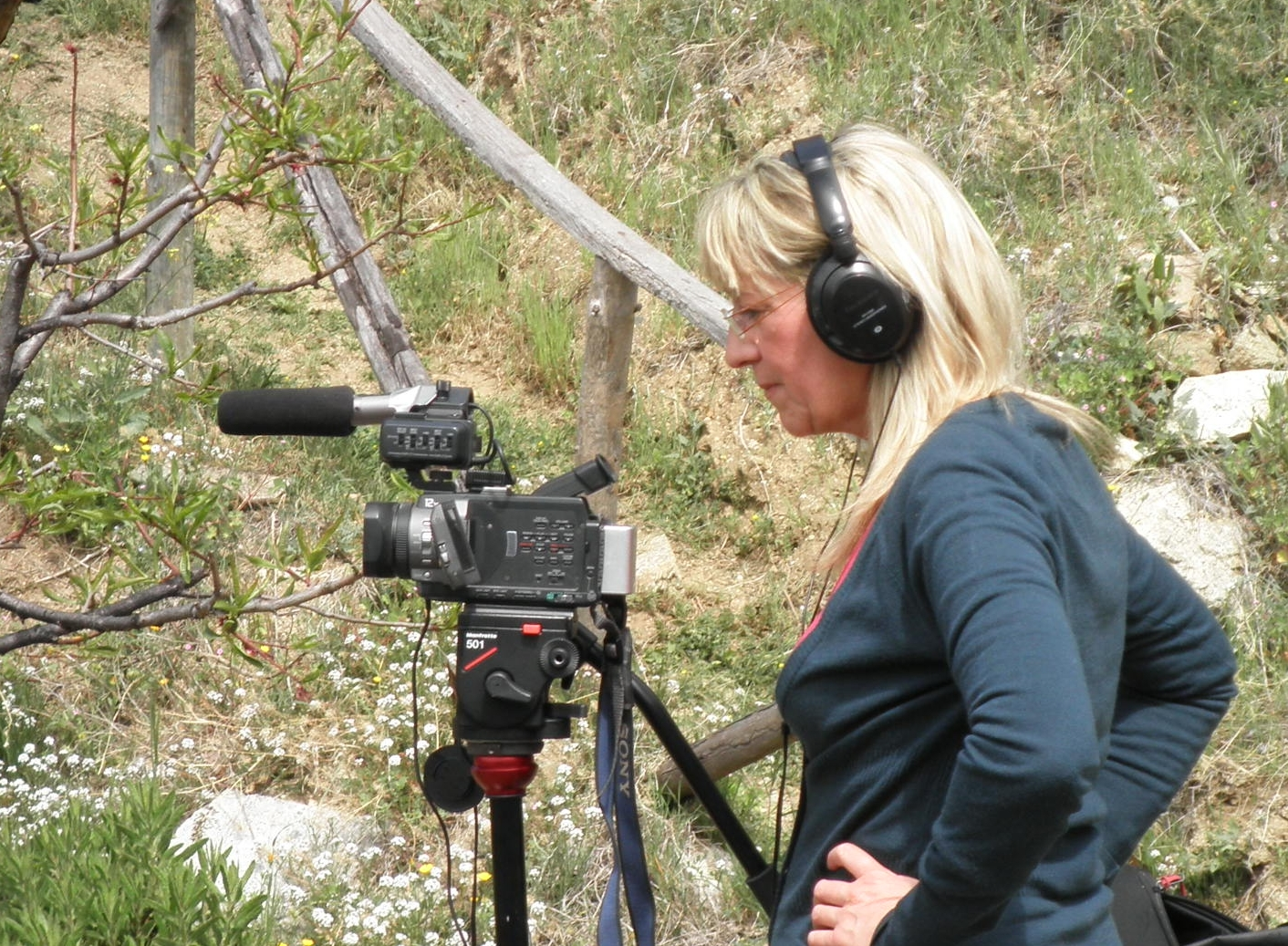
- Xargay in 2012
- Born: 12 April 1960; Sant Feliu de Guíxols
- Died: 19 January 2024 (aged 63); Palamós
- Education: University of Barcelona
- Occupations: Poet; video artist; translator; cultural agitator
- Writing career
- Language: Catalan, French
- Notable work: Desintegrar-se
- Notable awards: Premi de poesia catalana "Cadaqués a Rosa Leveroni"

Ester Xargay Melero (Sant Feliu de Guíxols, 12 April 1960 – Palamós, 19 January 2024) was a Catalan poet, video artist, translator and cultural agitator. She was also active in writing novels, essays, and translations. Her work, poetic and audiovisual, was marked by experimentation through which she addressed topics such as late capitalism, sexism, environmental destruction, and repression by the Spanish state.

== Early life and education ==
Ester Xargay Melero spent her adolescence and youth between Paris and Bourges, and returned to the Catalan Countries when she was 18 to study art history at the University of Barcelona. She soon became interested in the link between the visual arts and poetry.

== Career ==
She was part of the Catalan poetic scene at the turn of the 21st century, weaving her work and moving many cultural activities and initiatives from behind the scenes. She also cultivated the genre of artistic action and happenings.

Xargay's poetic work has been described as groundbreaking. (Note: According to Jaume Aulet, "La poesia d'Ester Xargay és provocadora i transgressora. Tensa el llenguatge fins al límit de l'experimentació i s'acosta sovint a les actituds de la poesia que la tradició –especialment la francesa– ha qualificat de maleïda. És l'insurrecte que entra per la boca i, fet eructe, en surt gramatical, tal com expressa en una de les seves composicions." (trans. Ester Xargay's poetry is provocative and transgressive. She stretches language to the limit of experimentation and often approaches the attitudes of poetry that tradition – especially the French one – has described as cursed. She is the insurgent who enters through the mouth and, belched out, comes out grammatical, as she expresses in one of her compositions.)) Her poetry is characterized by a formal experimentation that often forgoes personal, temporal, or narrative references, and moves away from the traditional sequential structure of poetic discourse. She collaborated on various poetic research projects, some of them with Carles Hac Mor. She also worked as a screenwriter and translator of works by Blas de Otero, Tzvetan Todorov, Blaise Pascal, and Raymond Queneau.

Xargay contributed to newspapers and magazines such as Avui, Papers d'Art, Reduccions, Transversal, Talp Club, Làtex, Sense títol, Barcelona Review, Internet Corner, and El Temps, with articles on interdisciplinarity, the dissolution of genres, and other topics in the field of art and literature.

With David Castillo i Buïls, she was in charge of Barcelona Poetry Week from 2005 to 2010, and with Eduard Escoffet and Martí Sales in 2011. In recent years, she directed La Païssa, a cultural space within El Marquet de les Roques, at Parque natural de San Lorenzo del Munt y del Obac, the house where Joan Oliver i Sallarès vacationed, which is owned by the Provincial Deputation of Barcelona.

== Death and legacy ==
She died 19 January 2024, at the age of 63.

In 2025, the Juneda City Council and the Centre of Arts and Memory of Ponent (CAMP) launched the Ester Xargay Videopoetry Award, an award aimed at fostering the field of video art linked to literature, which recognizes the best audiovisual pieces based on poems, exploring the relationship between the word and moving images.

== Selected works ==
=== Poetry collections ===
- Els àngels soterrats, 1990
- Un pedrís de mil estones, with Carles Hac Mor, 1992. (ISBN 9788486542474)
- Volts en el temps, La Cèl·lula, 1997 (reprinted in the book Trenca-sons)
- Epítom infranu o no (Ombres de poemes de Marcel Duchamp), with Carles Hac Mor, 1997. (ISBN 9788479354565)
- Darrere les tanques, 2000. (ISBN 9788487685897)
- Trenca-sons, 2002. (ISBN 9788489885417)
- Salflorvatge, 2006. (ISBN 9788496638006)
- Zooflèxia (el bestiari més veritable de tots), 2007. (ISBN 9788496638099)
- Fissura, 2008.
- Aürt, 2009. (ISBN 9788497797504)
- Eixida al sostre, 2009. (ISBN 9788492408863)
- Infinitius, 2017. (ISBN 978-84-16554-59-1)
- Desintegrar-se, 2019. (ISBN 978-84-948342-6-4)

=== Novels ===
- Carabassa a tot drap, o Amor lliure, ús i abús, with Carles Hac Mor, 2001.

=== Theatre ===
- Tirant lo Blanc la, o La perfecció és feixista, o La construcció del socialisme, with Carles Hac Mor, 2000.

== Awards and honours ==
- Desintegrar-se, Premi de poesia catalana "Cadaqués a Rosa Leveroni" (Catalan poetry prize "Cadaqués a Rosa Leveroni"), 2018
