= Taberner =

Taberner is a Catalan surname. Notable people with the surname or a variant include:

- Alfonso Sánchez-Tabernero (born 1961), President of the University of Navarra
- Annette Taberner (born 1973), Cuban-American neuroscientist
- Carlos Taberner (born 1997), Spanish tennis player
- Danny Taberner (born 1993), English footballer
- Javier Martínez Tabernero (born 1997), Spanish footballer
- Marc Serramitja Taberner (born 1990), Spanish footballer
- Matt Taberner (born 1993), Australian footballer
- Ramon Bech Taberner (1918–1995), Spanish Catalan writer and journalist
