= Maria Mercè Marçal =

Catalan poet, professor, writer and translator

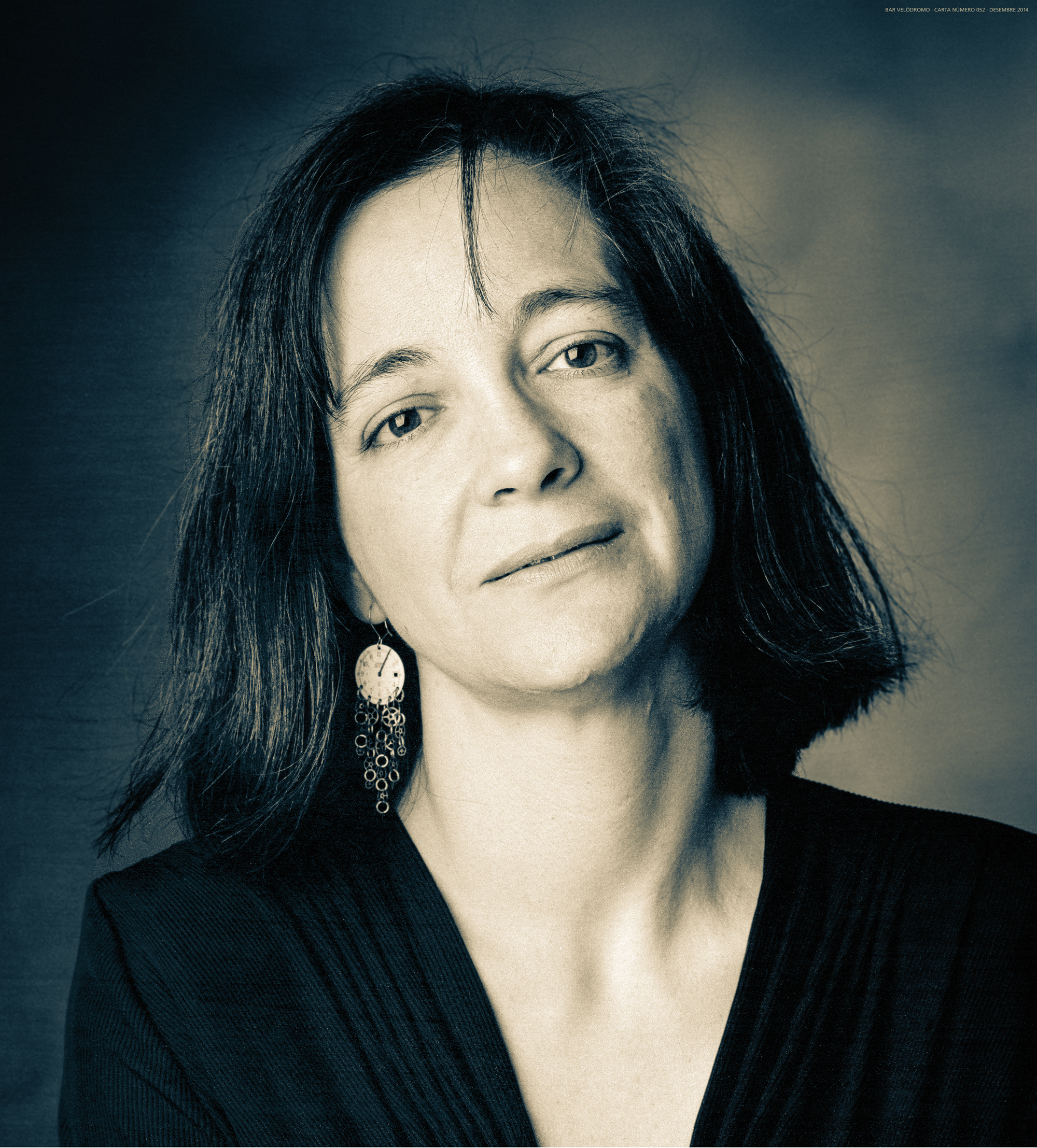
- Born: 13 November 1952; Ivars d'Urgell, Catalonia, Spain
- Died: 5 July 1998 (aged 45); Barcelona, Catalonia, Spain
- Education: University of Barcelona
- Occupations: Poet, Professor, Writer, Translator
- Children: Heura Marçal (1980)
- Writing career
- Language: Catalan
- Notable awards: Prudenci Bertrana Prize 1995 for La passió segons Renée Vivien Carles Riba Poetry Prize 1976 for Cau de llunes

Maria Mercè Marçal i Serra (13 November 1952 – 5 July 1998) was a Catalan poet, professor, writer and translator from Spain.

== Biography ==
Marçal was born in Barcelona but spent her childhood in Ivars d'Urgell (Pla d'Urgell), which she considered her home. Her mother was Maria Serra, a woman who loved theater and songs, and her father was Antoni Marçal, who had to leave college for family reasons. She had a sister, Magda.

She went to high-school in Lleida, at the Institut de Lleida, after receiving a scholarship. She then studied literature at the University of Barcelona, earning a degree in Classical Philology there. She went on to become a Professor of Catalan Language and Literature.

In 1972, Marçal married the poet Ramon Pinyol Balasch. They separated some time afterward. She would later form a long-term relationship with feminist writer and translator, Fina Birulés.

In 1973, she was a co-founder of the publishing house Llibres del Mall with her husband and another young Catalan poet, Xavier Bru de Sala.

In 1980, her daughter Heura was born, an experience she would write about in her poetry.

In 1992 she proposed the creation of Catalan Women Writers as part of the Catalan Centre for PEN.

She translated into Catalan works by both French and Russian writers: Colette, Marguerite Yourcenar, Anna Akhmatova, Marina Tsvetaeva, Baudelaire and Leonor Fini.

Marçal died in Barcelona in 1998 of cancer, aged 45.

== Literary work ==
Marçal's first book of poems Cau de llunes (winner of the Carles Riba Poetry Prize), introduced by a splendid poetic sestina penned by Joan Brossa, includes the poem "Divisa," which is a kind of manifesto summarizing what guided her activism and poetry. Her life's work was based around the Catalan language, social justice, and feminism. She was one of the first Catalan poets to explicitly write about the love between two women.

To fate I am grateful for three gifts: having been born a woman,

from a lower class and an oppressed nation.

And the turbid azure of being three times a rebel.

Two of Marçal's books of poetry, Bruixa de dol (1979) (Witch in Mourning) and Rao del cos (published in 2000) (The Body's Reason), have been translated into English.

Her only novel, The Passion according to Renée Vivien, was published in 1994. Following on from ten years of work researching the life and poetry of Vivien, this poetic almost-biographical novel won several awards such as the Premi Carlemany, Premi de la Crítica, the Prudenci Bertrana prize, the Institució de les Lletres Catalanes award, the Crítica Serra d'Or prize and the Joan Crexells award. It was translated into English and published by Francis Boutle Publishers in 2020.

== Poems set to music ==
Marina Rossell, Teresa Rebull, Ramon Muntaner, Txiqui Berraondo, Maria del Mar Bonet, Celdoni Fonoll and Gisela Bellsolà have sung Marçal's poems.

== Published work ==
Source:

== Poetry ==
- Cau de llunes. Barcelona. Proa, 1977. ISBN 84-209-7191-X
- Bruixa de dol (1977–1979). Sant Boi de Llobregat. Llibres del Mall, 1979. ISBN 84-7456-049-7
- Terra de mai. Valencia. El cingle, 1982. ISBN 84-7456-124-8
- Sal oberta. Sant Boi de Llobregat. Llibres del Mall, 1982. ISBN 84-7456-122-1
- La germana, l'estrangera (1981–1984). Sant Boi de Llobregat. Llibres del Mall, 1985. ISBN 84-7456-277-5
- Desglaç (1984–1988). Barcelona. Edicions 62 - Empúries, 1988.
- Raó del cos. Barcelona. Edicions 62 - Empúries, 2000. ISBN 84-297-4685-4
- Contraban de llum: antologia poètica. Barcelona. Proa, 2001. ISBN 84-8256-672-5

== Novel ==
- La passió segons Renée Vivien. Barcelona. Proa, 1994. ISBN 84-7809-739-2

== Children's literature ==
- Uf, quin dissabte, rateta Arbequina! Barcelona. Estrella Polar, 2012.

== Other publications ==
- Contraclaror: antologia poètica, de Clementina Arderiu. [Anthology of Arderiu's poetry curated by Marçal]. Barcelona. laSal, edicions de les dones, 1985. ISBN 84-85627-26-1
- Llengua abolida (1973–1988). [Collection of texts and articles on language and literatue] Valencia: Climent, 1989. ISBN 84-7502-246-4
- Paisatge emergent: trenta poetes catalanes del S.XX. [Selected works by 30 Catalan female poets, curated by Marçal]. Barcelona. La Magrana, 1999. ISBN 84-8264-167-0
- Sota el signe del drac. Proses 1985-1997. [Collection of writings on feminism and literature]. Barcelona, Proa, 2004.
- El meu amor sense casa (CD). Barcelona: Proa, 2003. ISBN 84-8437-513-7
- El senyal de la pèrdua. Escrits inèdits dels últims anys. [Diary entries and letters]. Barcelona, Empúries, 2014.
- Contra la inèrcia. Textos polítics (1979-1980). [Selection of political and social articles]. Barcelona: Comanegra, 2019.

== Work translated into English ==
- Witch in Mourning. Translation of Bruixa de dol, translated by Clyde Moneyhun. London. Francis Boutle Publishers, 2023. ISBN 9781739895525
- The Body's Reason. Translation of Raó del cos, translated by Montserrat Abelló and Noèlia Díaz Vicedo. London. Francis Boutle Publishers, 2014. ISBN 9781739895525
- The Passion according to Renée Vivien. Translation of La passió segons Renée Vivien, translated by Kathleen McNerney and Helena Buffery. London. Francis Boutle Publishers, 2020. ISBN 978 1 9164906 5 9
