= Teresa Rebull =

Catalan socialist activist and singer-songwriter

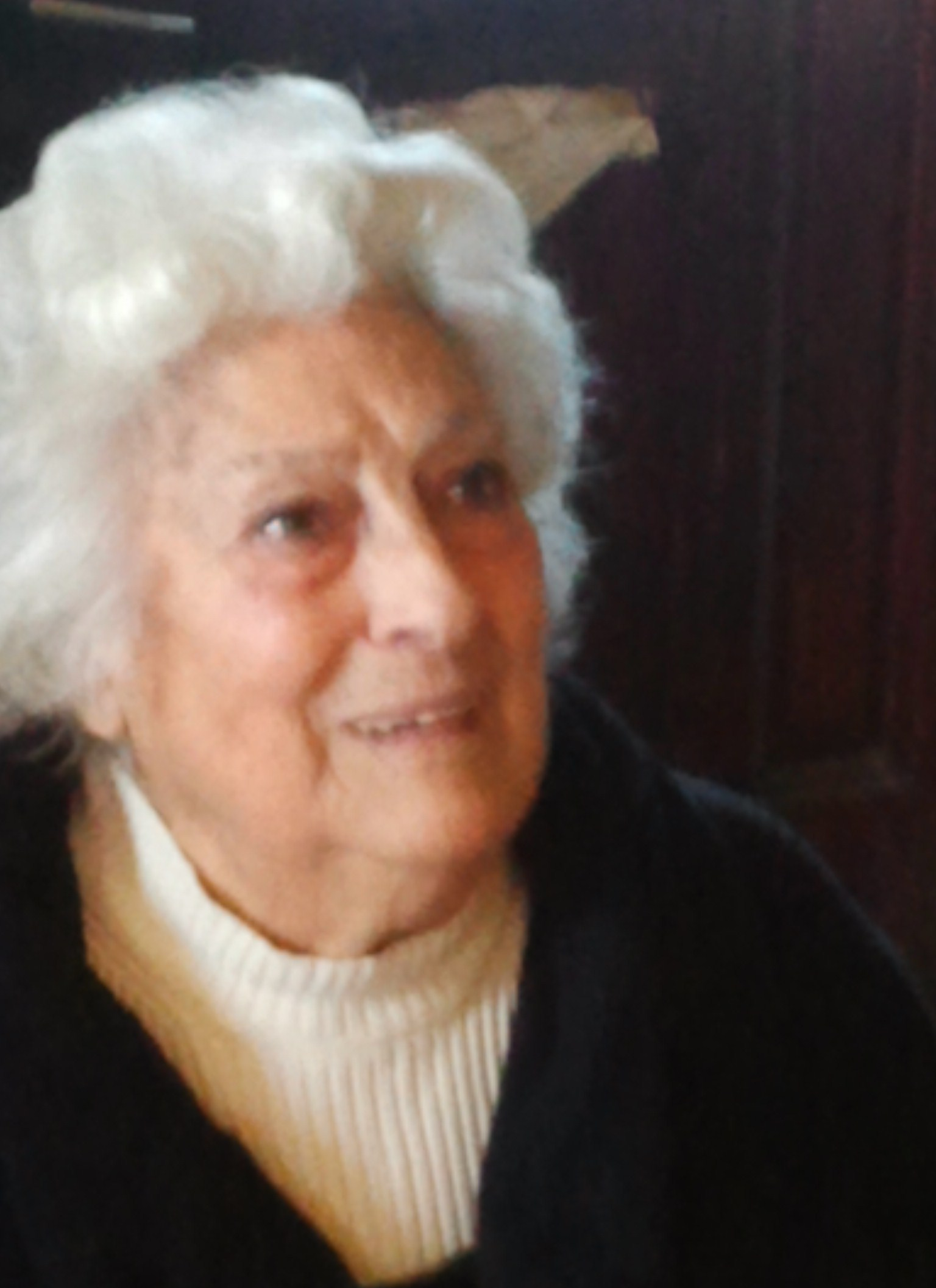
- Teresa Rebull (2012)
- Born: Teresa Soler i Pi; 24 September 1919; Sabadell, Catalonia, Spain
- Died: 15 April 2015 (aged 95); Banyuls de la Marenda, Northern Catalonia, France
- Occupation: Singer-songwriter
- Political party: Workers' Party of Marxist Unification (1936-1939); Socialists' Party of Catalonia (1978-2006)
- Movement: Nova Cançó
- Spouse: Josep Rebull Cabré
- Parents: Gonçal Soler i Bernabeu (father); Balbina Pi i Sanllehy (mother)
- Awards: Creu de Sant Jordi (1992); Premi Memorial Francesc Macià (2007)

Teresa Rebull, née Teresa Soler i Pi (1919–2015), was a Catalan socialist activist, singer-songwriter and painter. The daughter of anarcho-syndicalists Gonçal Soler i Bernabeu and Balbina Pi i Sanllehy, she joined the POUM and worked as a nurse during the Spanish Civil War. She was actively involved in the May Days events and punished for that. She later escaped Spain, where she could face danger from both Stalinists and Francoists, for France. In France, she would join the Maquis after the Nazi invasion. After the war, she became a singer and was musically associated to Nova Cançó.

== Biography ==
=== Childhood ===
Teresa Rebull was born in Carrer de Cellers, in the Gràcia neighborhood of Sabadell on 21 September 1919, although the Civil Registry erroneously states that she was born on 24 September. When she was 3 years old, the family went to live in Sant Boi de Llobregat, where her sister, Llibertat, was born in 1922. In 1924 they settled in Alcoy, where her second sister, Assutzena, was born. They went to live in Barcelona, in La Bordeta and in Sant Boi again, before returning to Barcelona. They settled on Carrer de la Diputació, where she saw many of the trade union leaders of the time passing by. From 1930 to 1936, the family returned to Sabadell, where they lived in separate homes. She went to the school of Mr. Estruch, on Carrer del Sol, and at the school of the married couple Carme Simó and Enric Casassas. In 1931, when she was 12 years old, Teresa started working in the textile factory, so she had to study in the evenings, first at the Federal Republican Circle and then at the Center for Dependents.

=== Republican period ===
Her mother was a friend of the Catalan President Lluis Companys and in 1936 Teresa got a job as a secretary in the labour department of the Generalitat de Catalunya. With this new job, she settled down in a shared flat on Carrer de Sant Pau in Barcelona, where she came into contact with Manolo Maurin, Josep Rebull and other militants of the Workers' Party of Marxist Unification (POUM), where she begame a member of in 1936. On 19 July 1936, she settled in Sabadell to work as a nurse, but soon after she returned to Barcelona and continued working at the Ministry of Labour. Due to the May Days of 1937, her parents - who had recently settled in Barcelona - were forced to leave home due to political differences with the communists. As a result of the events, she spent 8 days in the Via Laietana prison, but she was released thanks to the intervention of the communist Rafael Vidiella. Her parents and sisters went into hiding in Palafolls. The conflict practically meant the end of the POUM and touched it very closely: The POUM's leader Andreu Nin was killed and Teresa watched her friend Manolo Maurin die in a bed at the Hospital de Sant Pau in Barcelona.

=== Franco's occupation and exile ===
Once the POUM was dissolved and after seeing her comrades die, in the spring of 1939, she fled to Vic - where she met her partner, Pep Rebull. She then crossed over the Pyrenees into Northern Catalonia, before heading on from Perpignan to Paris, where she settled in Bezons with Pep Rebull. In 1940, she briefly returned to Barcelona, where she worked as a dancer in a flamenco company and where she also worked at a stall in the Mercat de Gràcia. In 1941, she crossed the border on foot to reunite in Paris with Pep Rebull, who could not return because he had been convicted. Teresa also returned to Barcelona to support her father, who was imprisoned. After a few days, she crossed the border again at night with two pins. She went from Figueres to Algiers and settled in Marseille, from which she had the opportunity to emigrate to the United States thanks to the American Committee to Aid Immigrant Intellectuals. But she was pregnant and stayed in Marseille, where she made friends with French intellectuals such as André Breton and Jean Malaquais. On 10 April 1942, her first son, Daniel, was born in Regussa, where she collaborated with the Maquis who hid in the Pelenc forest and where they lived until the end of the war. On 29 July 1945, their second son, Germinal, was born in Marseille, where they lived until 1948. The family settled in Paris, in the 11th arrondissement. There, Teresa befriended Jean Paul Sartre, Albert Camus and Georges Brassens, discovered Juliette Gréco, Boris Vian, Mario Vargas Llosa and Jorge Luis Borges. She also participated in events at the Casal de Catalunya de Paris, where she sang at the Orpheon and did theater and dance. In 1950, she worked as secretary of the Spanish Republican government in exile. She did a number of different jobs to survive: shoemaker, dancer in the ballet La Bella de Cádiz and singer Luis Mariano, fruit seller, interpreter of Iberian folklore melodies, etc. In 1952, her sister Assutzena went to Paris and together they formed a duo, Les Seurs Soler, who until the end of the decade sang songs from different cultures of the peninsula and worked with Brassens, Yves Montand, Leny Escudero, Patachou, among others. From 1961 to 1967, she worked as an administrator for the magazines Preuves and Cuadernos – specializing in issues in Latin America– and came into contact with many French and South American intellectuals. At that time, she began to receive painting lessons at André Michael's house, an activity that she would not stop practicing until his death. In 1967, she started working at Regne Renault, but she didn't last long there.

=== Nova Cançó ===
In 1968, she met Raimon in Paris and Rebull got the magazines where she worked to interview him. At the book party organized by the Casal de Catalunya, with Raimon, Maria Aurèlia Capmany and Guillermina Motta in attendance, Teresa Rebull sang two pieces. But the first public concert she gave was a spontaneous one in the Place de la Contrescarpe, in the bohemian district of Moufetard in Paris, where some young people had asked her to perform. From there, she started holding concerts in defense of the Catalan language and culture until 1980.

From 1955, the Rebull family summered in Banyuls de la Marenda, to be close to the border. In 1969, Art February took place in La Guingueta d'Ix, where she sang alongside Lluís Llach, Francesc Pi de la Serra, Ovidi Montllor, Maria del Mar Bonet and Miquel Cors, among others. It was her first contact with the Nova Cançó movement and, as she was already 50 years old and her companions were very young, she earned the affectionate name of Avia de la Nova Cançó (English: Grandmother of the New Song). She sang for a while in the Cova del Drac in Barcelona, where she came into contact with Guillem d'Efak. In France, she entered the circuit of the Maison de la Jeunesse et la Culture and acted in practically all departments of the hexagon. She largely stopped singing in 1980, only performing sporadically. However, on 6 July 2006, Òmnium Cultural organized a tribute concert for her at the Palau de la Música Catalana, where she had never performed until then. The CD Visca l'amor was produced from the concert. She was accompanied by a group of friends, including Lluís Llach, Maria del Mar Bonet, Joan Isaac, Blues de Picolat, Gisela Bellsolà, Josep Tero, Mariona Segarra or Gerard Jacquet.

=== Final years ===
From 1969 to 1985, she participated every year in the Catalan Summer University in Prada de Conflent. She was one of the founders of the Socialists' Party of Catalonia (PSC) and was a member until 2006. Established in Banyuls since 1971 - when Pep Rebull retired - she spent her last few years painting at home and attending events where she was requested. She died on 15 April 2015, at the age of 95.

== Work ==
Teresa Rebull has set to music poems by Joan Salvat-Papasseit (Master of Love, 1977), Josep Sebastià Pons (Camí de l'argilada, 1986) and Maria Mercè Marçal, among others. In 1999, she published Tot cantante, her autobiography. In 2000, she released the album Tot cantitan and in 2006, Visca l'amor, which took the name of the homonymous poem, included in the album, by Joan Salvat-Papasseit.

Autobiography

- Tot cantant (1999)

Discography

- Teresa Rebull (EP, Concèntric, 1969).
- Teresa Rebull canta les seves cançons. Als 4 Vents, 1973.
- Mester d'amor / Joan Salvat Papasseit (LP, Drums, 1977)
- Papallones... i més (LP, Picap, 1984).
- Camí de l'argilada (1986)
- Cançons populars catalanes (Terra nostra, 2002).
- Teresa Rebull. Cançons, 1969-1992 (Nord-Sud Music, 2004)
- Visca l'amor. Festa homenatge a Teresa Rebull (Picap, 2006)
- Papallones i més... (Picap, 2008).
- Teresa Rebull canta les seves cançons (Picap, 2012).

== Awards and recognitions ==
Teresa Rebull, in front of the last painting she painted.

- 1977: Charles-Cros Award for her album Mester d'amor.
- 1992: Creu de Sant Jordi.
- 2006: Òmnium Cultural organised a tribute in her honor on 6 July at the Palau de la Música Catalana, where she was able to perform for the first time since retirement.
- 2007: Francesc Macià Memorial Award, for her defense of the Catalan language and culture.
- The Sabadell City Council presented her with the Medal of the City.

== Bibliography ==
- Rebull, Teresa (1999). Tot cantant (in Catalan). Barcelona: Columna. ISBN 84-8300-761-4.
- Creus, Jordi (2007). Dones contra Franco (in Catalan). Barcelona: Ara Llibres. ISBN 9788496767003.
- Gamell, Josep (13 July 2013). "Teresa Rebull. Enyorança i records de Sabadell". Diari de Sabadell. Sabadellencs (in Catalan). pp. 23–26.
- Prat Fernàndez, Cesc (16 April 2015). "Teresa Rebull: "Aquests nanos de la CUP parlen com la gent del POUM"". Nuvol (in Catalan).
- Prat Fernàndez, Cesc (2016). "Una tarda amb Teresa Rebull". Vallesos (in Catalan) (Tardor-hivern 2015/2016): 152–153.
- Torres, Núria (May 2007). "L'àvia de la Nova Cançó". Sàpiens (in Catalan). No. 55. Barcelona. pp. 26–30. ISSN 1695-2014.
