= Carles Riba Poetry Prize =

Catalan literary award

The Carles Riba Poetry Prize (Catalan: Premi Carles Riba de poesia) is a literary prize for Catalan-language works awarded by the Edicions Proa publishing house with funding by the Catalan Encyclopedia Foundation. The winning poem is selected from original, unpublished poems during the Literary Night of Saint Lucía, organized by the Òmnium Cultural association. It has an endowment of €5,000.

The prize is a continuation of the Óssa Menor Prize, founded in 1950 by Josep Pedreira, editor of Els llibres de l'Óssa Menor. The prize was named in honor of the poet Carles Riba after his death in 1959.

== Winners ==
=== Óssa Menor Prize ===
- 1950 - Pere Ribot, for Llengua de foc
- 1951 - Joan Vinyoli, for Les hores retrobades
- 1952 - Blai Bonet, for Cant espiritual
- 1953 - Miquel Martí i Pol, for Paraules al vent
- 1954 - Jordi Sarsanedas, for La Rambla de les Flors
- 1955 - Pere Quart, for Terra de naufragis
- 1956 - Not awarded
- 1957 - Not awarded
- 1958 - Clementina Arderiu, for És a dir

=== Carles Riba Prize ===
- 1959 - Josep Maria Andreu, for Intento el poema
- 1960 - Ramon Bech, for Cants terrenals
- 1961 - Not awarded
- 1962 - Blai Bonet, for L'evangeli segons un de tants
- 1963 - Màrius Sampere, for L'home i el límit
- 1964 - Xavier Amorós, for Qui enganya, para
- 1965 - Francesc Vallverdú, for Cada paraula un vidre
- 1966 - Francesc Parcerisas, for Homes que es banyen
- 1967 - Jaume Vidal Alcover, for Terra negra
- 1968 - Joan Vergés, for La vida nova
- 1969 - Guillem d'Efak, for Madona i l'arbre
- 1970 - Josep Elias Cornet, for Per a un duc, Bach escriví música d'orgue a Weimar
- 1971 - Josep Maria Boix, for El suplicant, la deu i l'esma
- 1972 - Xavier Bru de Sala, for La fi del fil
- 1973 - Agustí Bartra, for Els himnes
- 1974 - Ramon Pinyol, for Occit enyor
- 1975 - Joan Argenté i Artigal, for Seminocturn-semidiürn
- 1976 - Maria Mercè Marçal, for Cau de llunes
- 1977 - Feliu Formosa, for Llibre de viatges
- 1978 - Jordi Pàmias, for Flauta del sol
- 1979 - Josep Piera, for El somriure de l'herba
- 1980 - Joan Montalà, for D'un torsimany al bosc, potser
- 1981 - Gerard Vergés, for L'ombra rogenca de la lloba
- 1982 - Miquel de Palol i Felip, for El porxo de les mirades
- 1983 - Valeriano Pujol, for La trista veu d'Orfeu i el Tornaveu de Tàntal
- 1984 - Carles Torner, for Als límits de la sal
- 1985 - Joan Margarit i Consarnau, for Mar d'hivern
- 1986 - Xavier Lloveras, for Les illes obstinades
- 1987 - Olga Xirinacs, for Llavis que dansen
- 1988 - Jaume Subirana, for Final de festa
- 1989 - Quima Jaume, for Pels camins remorosos de la mar
- 1990 - Àlex Susanna, for Les anelles dels anys
- 1991 - Antoni Puigvert i Romaguera, for Curset de natació
- 1992 - Andreu Vidal, for L'animal que no existeix
- 1993 - Albert Roig, for Vedat
- 1994 - Quim Español, for Ultralleugers
- 1995 - Enric Casasses, for Calç
- 1996 - Ponç Pons, for El salobre
- 1997 - David Castillo Buïls, for Game over
- 1998 - Enric Sòria, for L'instant etern
- 1999 - Pep Rosanes-Creus, for Voltor
- 2000 - Anna Aguilar-Amat, for Trànsit entre dos vols
- 2001 - Susanna Rafart, for Pou de glaç
- 2002 - Pere Rovira i Planas, for La mar de dins
- 2003 - Manuel Forcano, for El tren de Bagdad
- 2004 - Bartomeu Fiol, for Càbales del call
- 2005 - Isidre Martínez Marzo, for Hostes
- 2006 - Jaume Pont, for Enlloc
- 2007 - Txema Martínez Inglés, for L'arrel i la pluja
- 2008 - Sebastià Alzamora, for La part visible
- 2009 - Carles Camps i Mundó, for La mort i la paraula
- 2010 - Rosa Font, for Un lloc a l'ombra
- 2011 - Marcel Riera, for Llum d'Irlanda
- 2012 - Francesc Garriga, for Tornar és lluny
- 2013 - Marc Romera Roca, for La nosa
- 2014 - Hilari de Cara, for Refraccions
- 2015 - Víctor Obiols, for Dret al miracle
- 2016 - Maria Cabrera i Callís, for La ciutat cansada
- 2017 - Josep Maria Fulquet, for Ample vol de la nit
- 2018 - Carles Rebassa, for Sons bruts
- 2019 - Lluís Calvo, for L'espai profund
- 2020 - Miquel Desclot, for Despertar-me quan no dormo
- 2021 - Antoni Vidal Ferrando, for Si entra boira no tendré on anar
- 2022 - Jordi Llavina, for Un llum que crema
- 2023 - Mireia Calafell, for Si una emergència
