= Jaume Pont =

Catalan poet, literary critic and academic (1947–2026)

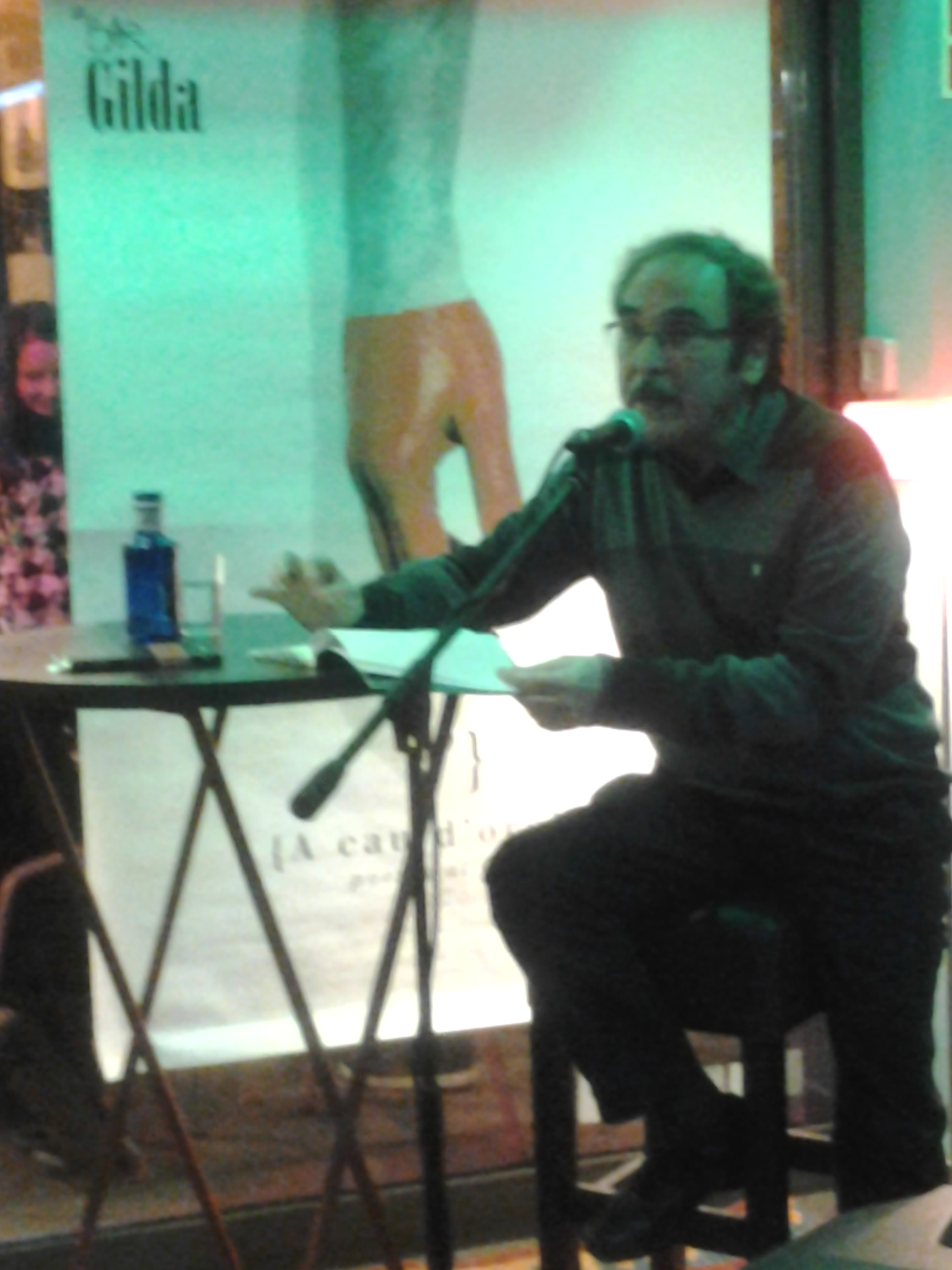
- Pont in 2014
- Born: Jaume Pont i Ibáñez; 24 March 1947; Lleida, Spain
- Died: 22 October 2026 (aged 79); Lleida, Spain
- Occupations: Poet; literary critic; academic

Jaume Pont i Ibáñez (24 March 1947 – 22 October 2026) was a Catalan poet, literary critic and academic. He taught Spanish literature at the University of Lleida for more than four decades and published poetry, literary studies and editions of other writers' work. His collection Enlloc won the 2006 Carles Riba Poetry Prize, and the French translation of Mirall de negra nit received the 2023 Prix Mallarmé étranger.

== Life and career ==
Pont was born in Lleida on 24 March 1947, and studied philosophy and letters. He taught at the University of Lleida for more than 40 years and was professor of Modern and Contemporary Spanish Literature there. He also taught at the University of Barcelona, the University of Poitiers, the University of Naples Federico II, the National University of Mar del Plata, the University of the Littoral Opal Coast and the University of Illinois.

He founded and directed the literary magazine Quaderns de Ponent from 1979 to 1983. His criticism appeared in specialist journals and in publications including Destino and Avui. His research included postismo, the work of Carlos Edmundo de Ory and nineteenth-century fantastic narrative.

== Literary work ==
Pont published his first poetry collection, Límit(s), in 1976. The Gran Enciclopèdia Catalana identifies a surrealist influence in that book and describes his later poetry as moving towards a more concentrated, sometimes hermetic style. It also identifies a recurring metaphysical tension between love and death, and Arabic literary references beginning with Divan. Vol de cendres grew out of the death of his father, while Enlloc used water as an image of erotic transformation and life.

Divan won the 1982 Vicent Andrés Estellés Prize. Raó d'atzar and Vol de cendres received the Serra d'Or Critics' Prize in 1991 and 1997 respectively, and Llibre de la frontera received the National Critics' Prize in 2001. Enlloc won the Carles Riba Poetry Prize in 2006, before its publication in 2007. Pont received the Virgile de Poésie prize in 2012 for his body of work.

The French translation of Mirall de negra nit, titled Miroir de nuit profonde and translated by François-Michel Durazzo, received the 2023 Prix Mallarmé étranger for translation.

== Personal life and death ==
Pont's partner, the educator Maria Jesús Cabau, predeceased him. He dedicated Mirall de negra nit to her memory.

Pont died in Lleida on 22 October 2026, at the age of 79.

== Selected works ==
=== Poetry collections and anthologies ===
Pont's poetry collections and anthologies of his work include the following.

- Límit(s) (1976)
- Els vels de l’eclipsi (1980)
- Jardí bàrbar (1981)
- Divan (1982)
- Raó d’atzar (1990)
- Vol de cendres (1996)
- Llibre de la frontera (2000)
- Enlloc (2007)
- L’altra llum. Poemes 1976–2011 (2015)
- Càntic d’ombres (2017)
- Mirall de negra nit (2020)
- Estuari de focs (Eros i Tànatos 1976–2020) (2025)

=== Literary studies and editions ===
His literary studies and editorial projects include the following.

- La nova poesia catalana: estudi i antologia (1980, with Joaquim Marco)
- El corrent G.V.: l’obra poètica de Guillem Viladot (1986)
- El postismo (1987)
- Narrativa fantástica en el siglo XIX (1997, editor)
- Música de lobo. Antología poética (1941–2001) (2003, introduction)
- Los reinos de allí. Poesía reunida 1940–2010 (2023, editor and introduction)
