= Balbina Pi i Sanllehy =

Spanish trade unionist (1896–1973)

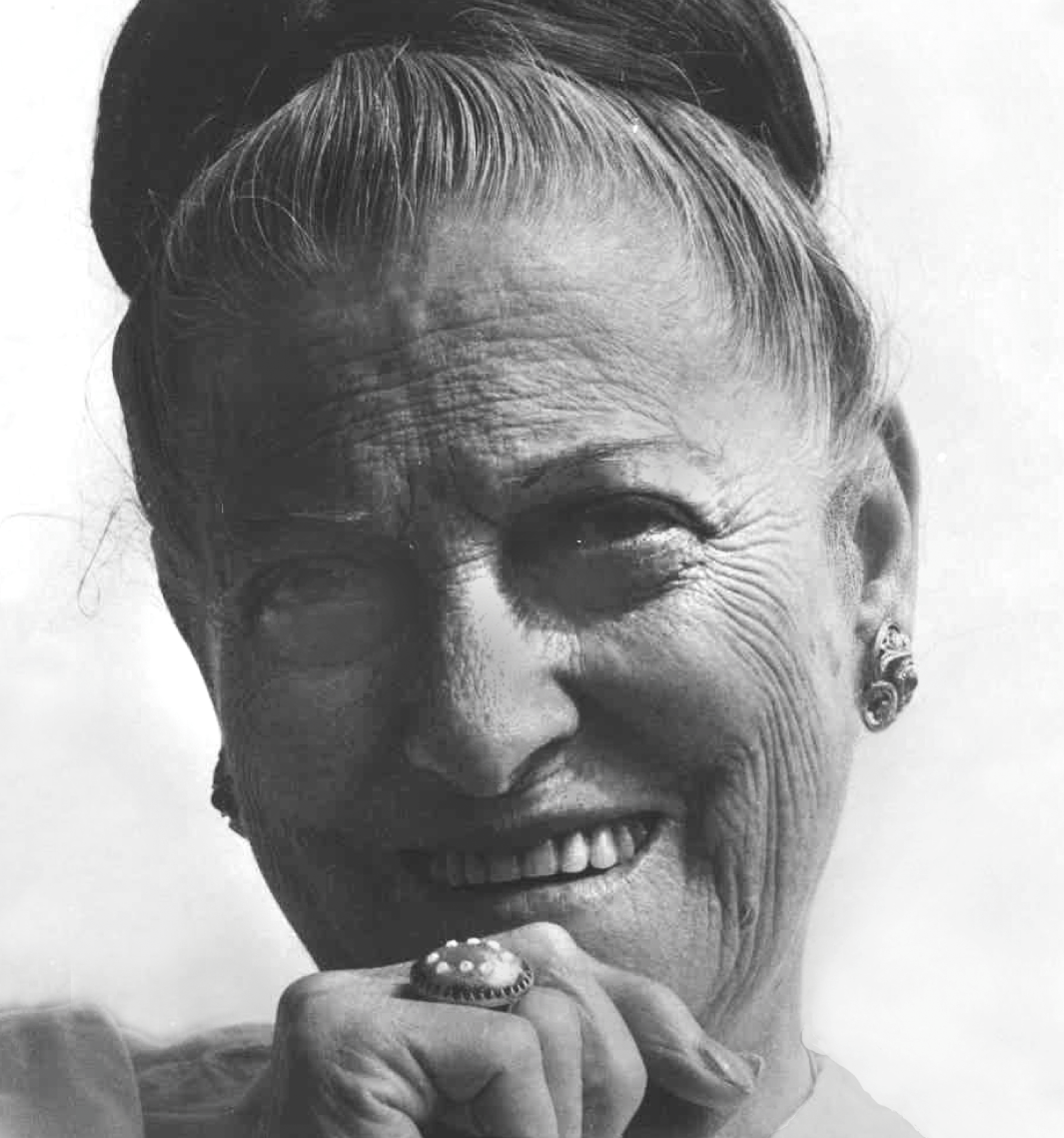
- Balbina Pi i Sanllehy
- Born: 20 September 1896; Sant Boi de Llobregat, Catalonia, Spain
- Died: 24 July 1973 (aged 76); Perpignan, France
- Other name: Libertad Caída
- Organization: Confederación Nacional del Trabajo
- Movement: Anarchism in Spain
- Partner: Gonçal Soler i Bernabeu

Balbina Pi i Sanllehy (1896–1973) was a Catalan anarcho-syndicalist. She was the mother of the singer Teresa Rebull and the partner of Gonçal Soler i Bernabeu.

== Biography ==
In 1917, while working as a spinner in Sabadell, she became a delegate of a Local Federation of the Confederación Nacional del Trabajo (CNT). He started holding rallies with her factory colleagues in Sabadell, alongside Ángel Pestaña, and later held rallies and conferences in textile manufacturing towns throughout Catalonia. She regularly contributed to Solidaridad Obrera and Nuestra Voz, often under the pseudonyms Margot and Libertad Caída. She also stood out doing theater in theater groups at the local libertarian athenaeum. Between 1920 and 1923, she carried out a number of actions in solidarity with the trade unionists that had been deported to La Mola. In 1923, she participated in the Regional Plenum of the anarchist unions in Lleida. Following the proclamation of the Second Spanish Republic in 1931, she became active in the most radical faction of organized anarchism. According to Joan Garcia i Oliver, she embroidered the first red-and-black flags that were ever used by the CNT-FAI. Due to disagreements with some anarchist sectors, in 1936, she formed her own anti-clerical women's group, with which she organized propaganda events. In 1939, when the Republicans lost the Spanish Civil War, she went underground and went into exile in Toulouse and Paris. She returned to theater in the groups of Solidaridad Internacional Antifascista (SIA). In 1970, in poor health, she left activism and went to live in Banyuls de la Marenda, where she spent the last days of her life near her daughter, the singer Teresa Rebull. She is buried together with her partner Gonçal Soler i Bernabeu in the Banyuls de la Marenda cemetery, with her name and dates of birth and death inscribed on a licorice stele.
