= Maria Cabrera i Callís =

Spanish poet and writer

- Born: 1983 (age 42–43); Girona, Spain
- Education: University of Barcelona
- Occupations: Poet, philologist, university professor, and writer

Maria Cabrera i Callís (Girona, 1983) is a Spanish poet and associate professor at the University of Barcelona. She graduated with a degree in Catalan philology from the University of Barcelona with a thesis on linguistics titled El rotacisme de /d/ intervocàlica en alguerès. Interpretació fonològica i anàlisi quantitativa de la variació. She is working on a doctoral thesis in linguistics titled Contactes consonàntics en alguerès. Descripció i anàlisi sincròniques.

Various Catalan groups and singers have set some of her poems to music, including Manel with "Jonàs," Petit with the unpublished poem "Nit mallorquina" on the album Llenya Prima, Miss Carrussel and Clara Peya with "Cançó dels dies de cada dia" in La matinada clara, and Sílvia Pérez Cruz with "Salm i paràbola de la memòria pròdiga" from the poetry collection La matinada clara in "Pare meu."

== Published poetry ==
- Jonàs (Editorial Galerada, 2004)
- La matinada clara (Edicions a Petició, 2010) with illustrations by Maria Alcaraz i Frasquet. This poetry collection shares a title with "La matinada clara" by Joan Salvat-Papasseit.
- Ningú no ens representa. Poetes emprenyats (Editorial Setzevents, 2011) with seventy other poets. This poetry collection emerged during the 2011 15-M Movement in Plaça de Catalunya, Barcelona.

== Prizes ==
- 2004: Amadeu Oller Prize for young unpublished poets for Jonàs
- 2016: Carles Riba Poetry Prize for La ciutat cansada
