= Jean-Paul Goujon =

French university professor and writer (born 1949)

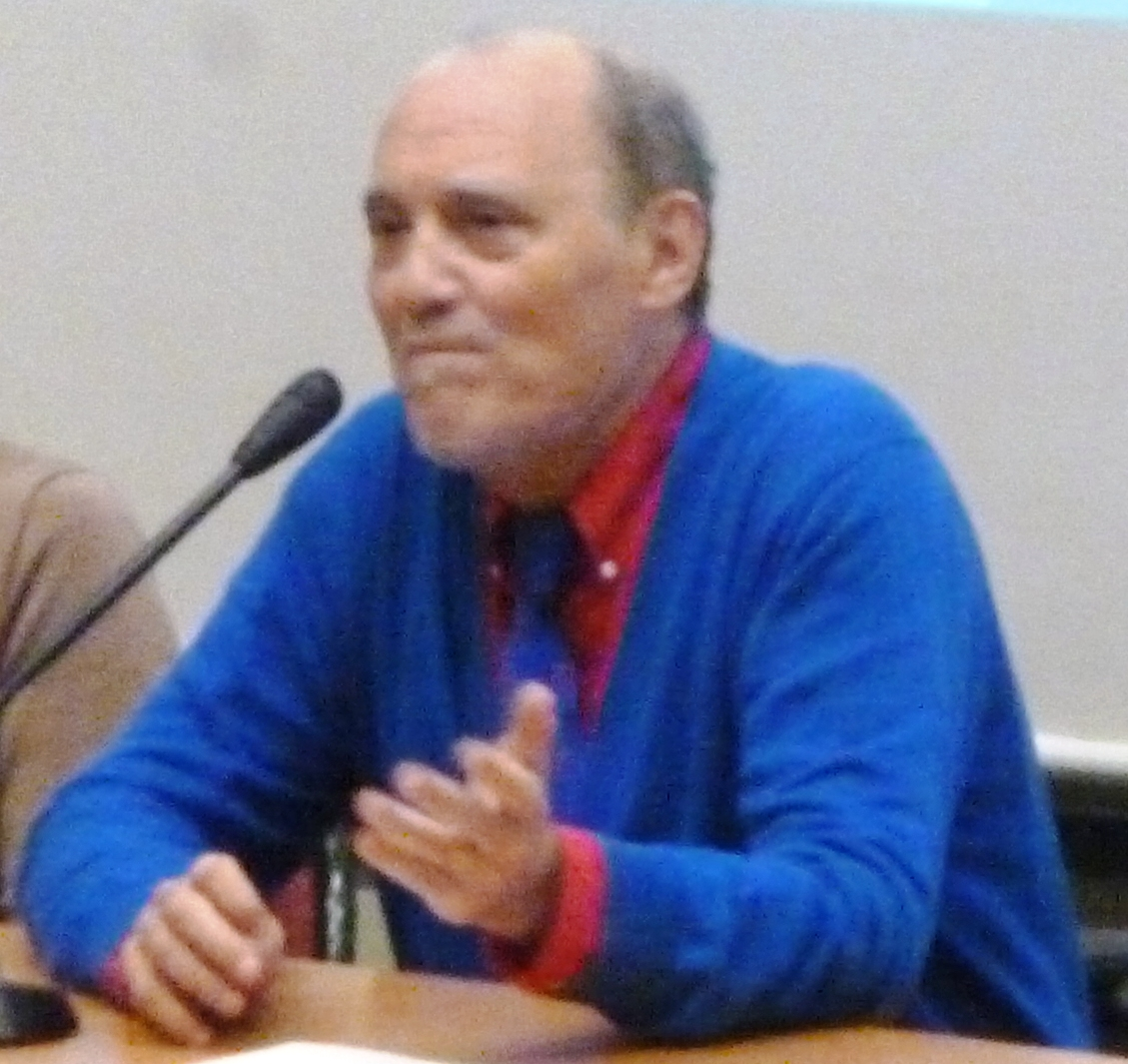
Jean-Paul Goujon

Jean-Paul Goujon (born 1949) is a French university professor and writer.

== Biography ==
An honorary professor of French literature at the University of Seville, "specialist of 20th-century writers" and in particular of Pierre Louÿs, Jean-Paul Goujon is the author of several biographies and anthologies.

== Publications (selection) ==
- L'amitié de Pierre Louÿs et de Jean de Tinan, Pour les amis de Pierre Louÿs, 1977
- Renée Vivien à Mytilène, À l'Écart, 1978
- Renée Vivien, Œuvre poétique complète (1877–1909), Régine Deforges, 1986
- Tes blessures sont plus douces que leurs caresses. Vie de Renée Vivien, Régine Deforges, 1986
- Pierre Louÿs. Une vie secrète (1870–1925), Seghers, 1988
- Jean de Tinan, Plon, 1990
- Léon-Paul Fargue. Poète et piéton de Paris, Éditions Gallimard, 1997
- Dossier secret. Pierre Louÿs - Marie de Régnier, Christian Bourgois, 2002
- Mille lettres inédites de Pierre Louÿs à Georges Louis 1890-1917, Fayard, 2002
- Anthologie de la poésie érotique française, Fayard, 2004
- Ôte-moi d'un doute. L'énigme Corneille-Molière, with Jean-Jacques Lefrère, Fayard, 2006
- Anthologie de la poésie érotique - Poèmes érotiques français du Moyen Age au XXe siècle, Points, 2008
- Anthologie de la poésie amoureuse française. Des trouvères à Apollinaire, Fayard, 2010
- Œuvre érotique by Pierre Louÿs, series "Bouquins", éd. Robert Laffont, 2012 ISBN 2-221-12747-1.

== Honours ==
- 1998: Prix de la biographie of the Académie française for Léon-Paul Fargue. Poète et piéton de Paris.
- 2002: Prix Goncourt de la biographie for Pierre Louÿs. Une vie secrète (1870-1925)
