= Enric Casasses =

Spanish poet

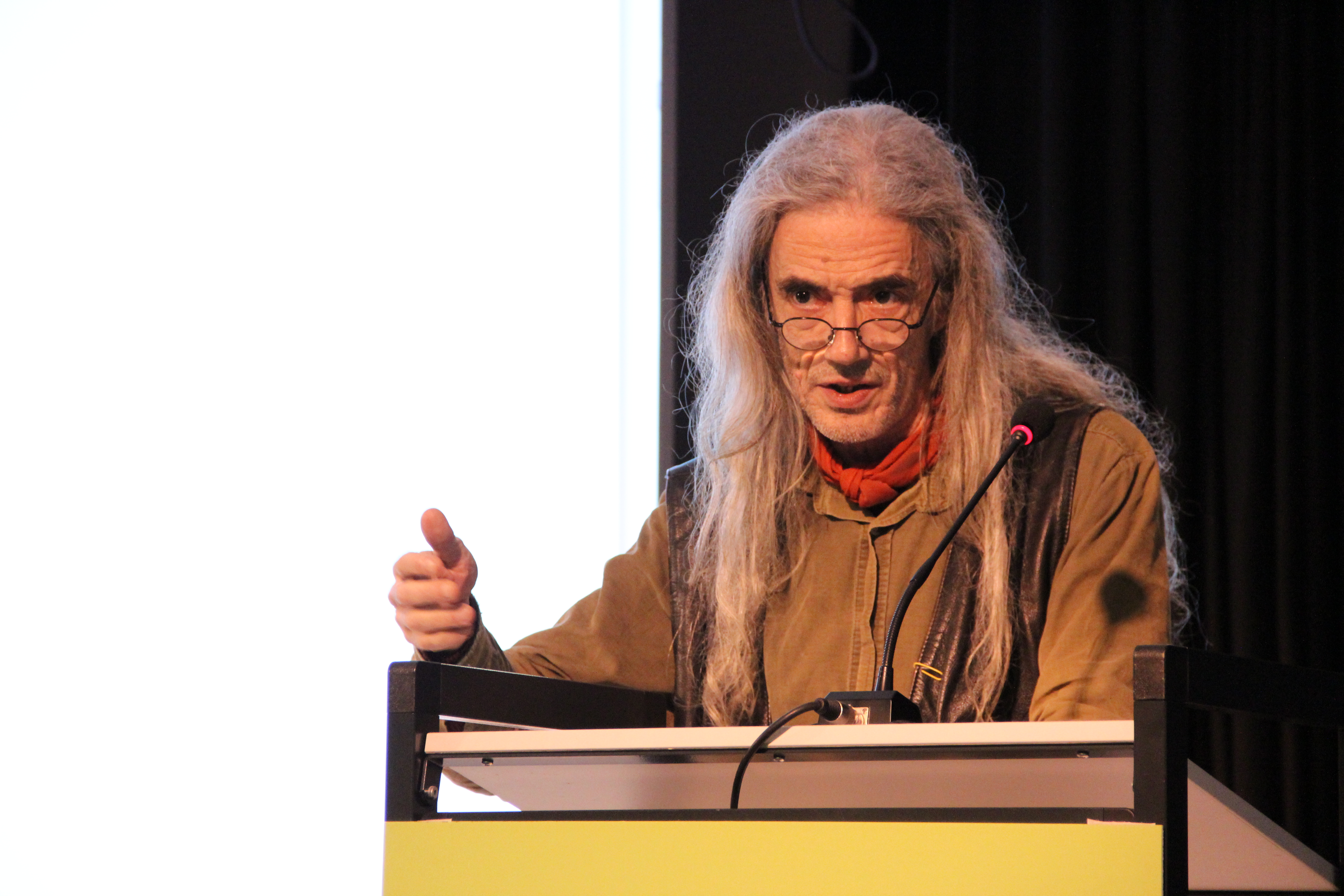
- Enric Casasses i Figueres
- Born: 1951 (age 74–75); Barcelona
- Occupation: Poet

Enric Casasses i Figueres (Barcelona, 1951) is a Spanish poet who writes in the Catalan language.

Casasses published his first two books of poetry, La bragueta encallada (1972) and La cosa aquella (1982), in alternative editions. In 1991, Casasses published a second edition of La cosa aquella.

Casasses has written over 25 books of poetry and received awards for No hi érem (Premi de la Crítica in 1993), Calç (Carles Riba Poetry Prize in 1995) and Plaça Raspall (Premi Joan Alcover in 1998).
