= Ramon Bech Taberner =

Catalan writer and journalist

Ramon Bech Taberner (June 16, 1918 – February 6, 1995) was a Catalan writer and journalist.

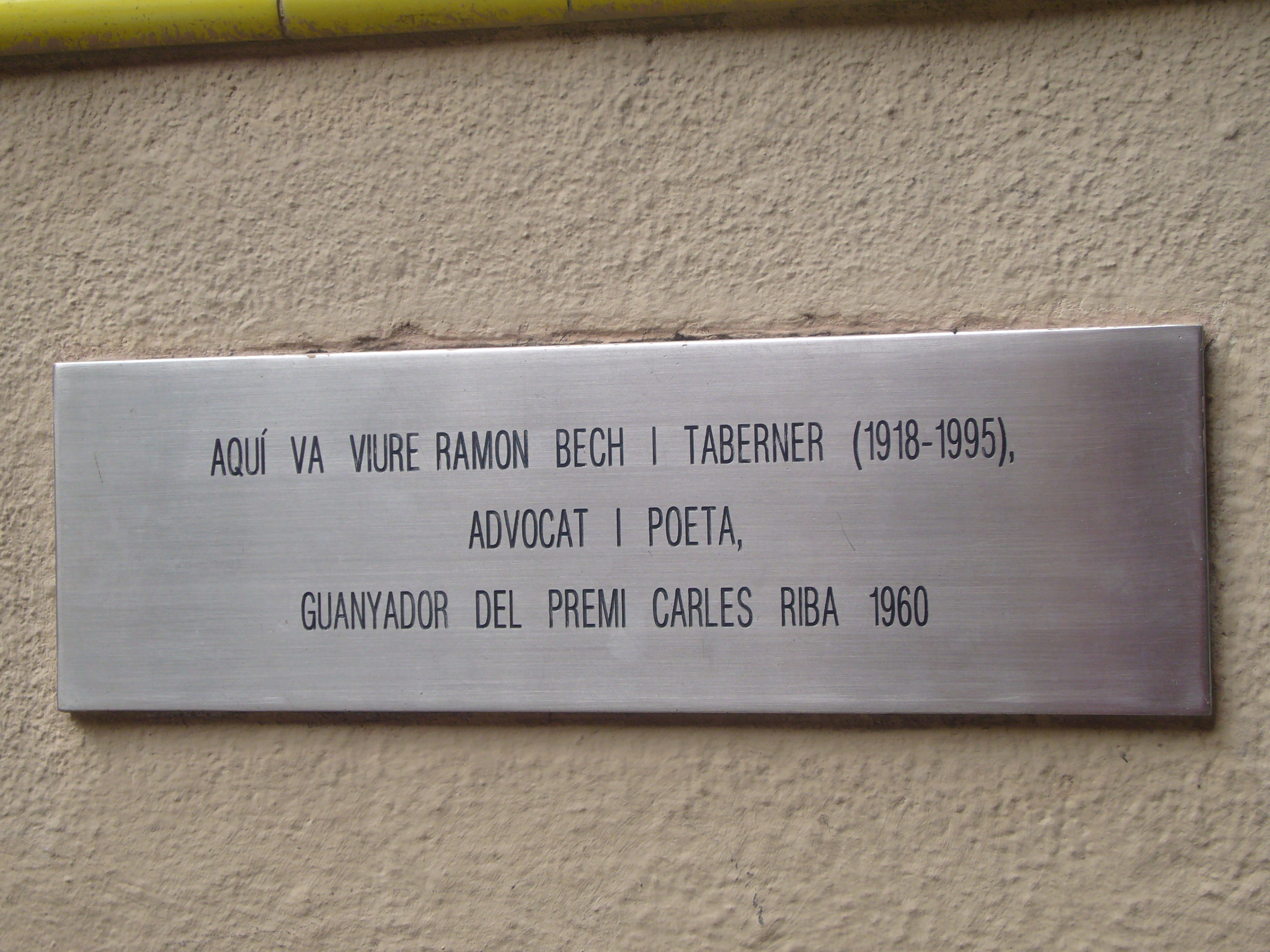
Plaque in Carrer Petritxol (Barcelona) of Bech i Taberner liging house

He was born in Barcelona. He joined the media in the hands of Sebastià Auger and Grupo Mundo where he held various management positions. He wrote regularly for several newspapers as Mundo Diario, Catalunya Express, Tele/eXpres or 4-2-4 and collaborated with the editorial Dopesa.

His literary output started at an early age. At 17, he published his first poems in a magazine directed by José María López. He was known for the publication of a collection of poems Noviluni (1938) and La ciutat submergida (The submerged city) (1947). He won the 1960 Carles Riba Poetry Prize with Cants terrenals (Earthly Songs) (published in 1962), with cut verses and avant-garde techniques.

Contrasted with this book, Joc de sirenes (Sirens game) was published in 1962, where he rehearsed symbolist sonnet tradition and in 1984 Quatre coses (Four Things). He was member of the poetic group called Oasis, along with other writers and permanent member of the jury John Estelrich prize. Primera Notícia/Obra poètica I (News / Poetic Work I) was first published in 1993. He also wrote and produced plays for the theater.

His personal collection is kept in the National Archive of Catalonia.

== Works ==
- La ciutat submergida, Barcelona Antologia 1947. OCLC 433392866
- Cants terrenals. Poemes. Carles Riba, 1960. OCLC 12983412
- Joc de sirenes. Barcelona, 1962. OCLC 12983420
- Teresa Pàmies, Ramon Bech Taberner Cuando éramos capitanes: (Memorias de aquella guerra). Dopesa, 1974
- Quatre Coses Poemes, Barcelona : Canigó, 1984, ISBN 9788439813705
- Obra poètica, L'Aixernador, 1992, ISBN 8486332877
