= David Castillo i Buïls =

Spanish poet, writer, and literary critic

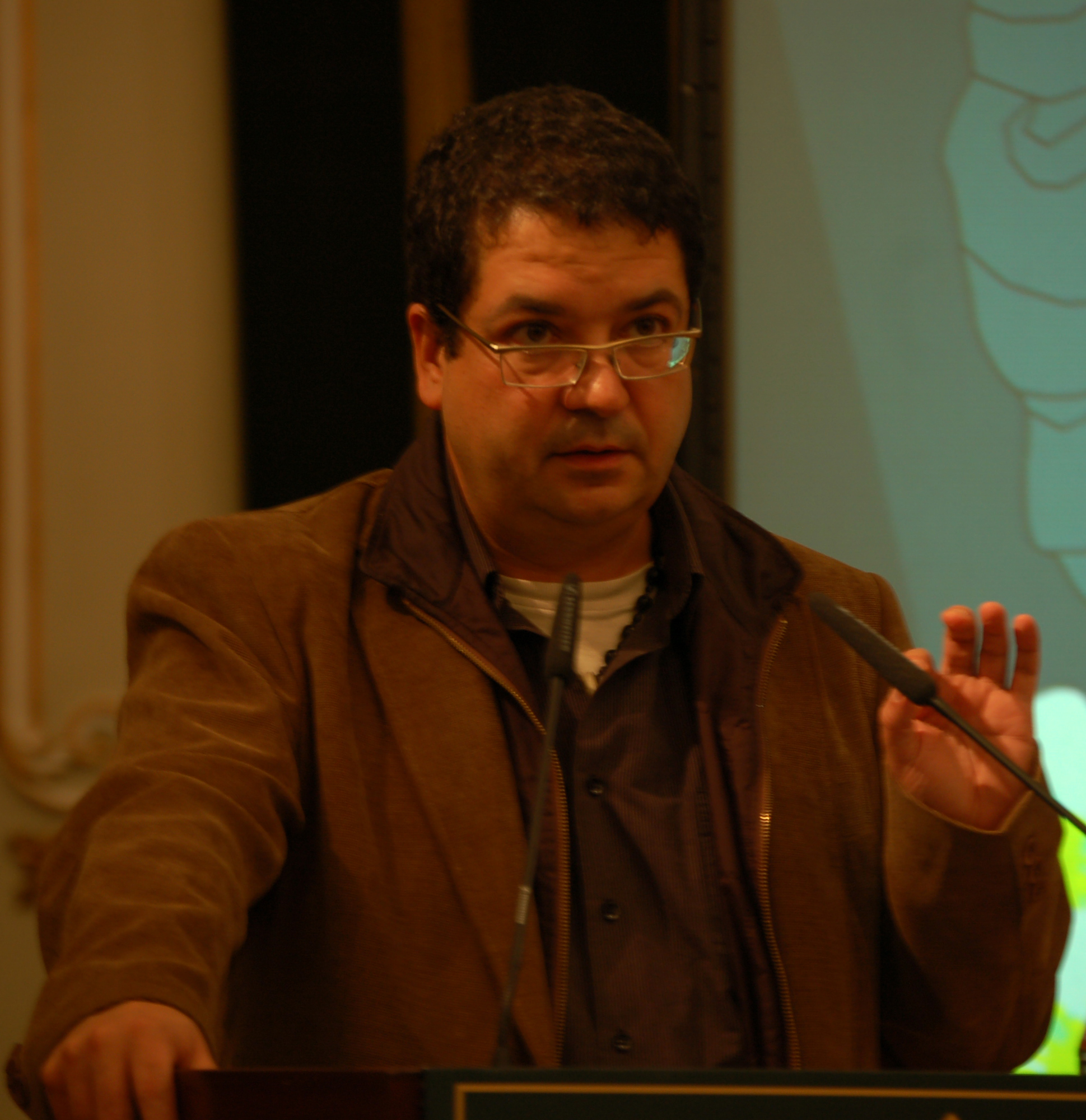
- David Castillo at 2010
- Born: David Castillo i Buïls; 1961 (age 64–65); Barcelona, Spain
- Occupations: Poet, novelist and biographer
- Writing career
- Language: Catalan
- Notable awards: Premi Joan Crexells de narrativa (1999), Premi Carles Riba de poesia (1997), Premi Sant Jordi de novel·la (2001)

David Castillo i Buïls (born Barcelona, 1961) is a Spanish poet, writer, and literary critic. He started out as a poet with counterculture and underground publications in the 1970s, although his first published work, a declaration of principles, was the biography of Bob Dylan in 1992. Three years earlier, he had been the anthologist of Ser del segle, which brought together leading voices of the generation of the 1980s. They were followed by a series of poems among them "Game over", which won the Carles Riba Poetry Prize. Then he began a career as a writer with novels like El cel de l'infern and No miris enrere, that were well accepted both by critics and the general public. El cel de l'infern was awarded the Crexells Prize for the best Catalan novel of the year in 1999. No miris enrere won the Premi Sant Jordi de novel·la of 2001. Castillo has received Atlàntida awards for journalism three times, and he has also been awarded the Italian "Tratti Poetry Prize for the best foreign poet" for his anthology of poetry translated into Italian. He has been organizing various poetic cycles. He is a founder of Poetry Week in Barcelona, and has been a director of it since 1997.

Since the return of democracy in Spain, Castillo has been publishing articles and literary criticism. Since 1989, he has been editor of the cultural supplement of the newspaper Avui, which in 2011 merged with El Punt, forming El Punt Avui. For eight years, he has led the magazine Lletra de canvi. He has also worked for five year as a lecturer at the Autonomous University of Barcelona. Together with the young poet Marc Sardà, he has published the book Conversaciones con Pepín Bello, which has had a deep impact in criticism.

== Works ==
=== Biography ===
- 1992 Bob Dylan
- 2007 Conversaciones con Pepín Bello, with Marc Sardà
- 2009 Bcn Rock, with Ferran Sendra

=== Poetry ===
- 1993 La muntanya russa
- 1994 Tenebra
- 1997 Poble Nou flash back, with Albert Chust
- 1998 Game over
- 2000 El pont de Mühlberg
- 2000 Seguint l'huracà, with Marcel Pey
- 2001 Bandera negra
- 2005 Menta i altres poemes
- 2006 Downtown
- 2006 Esquena nua
- 2011 Doble zero

=== Novels ===
- 1999 El cel de l'infern
- 2002 No miris enrere
- 2009 El llibre dels mals catalans
- 2010 El mar de la tranquil·litat

== Awards ==
- 1987 Premi Atlàntida millor revista cultural for the work "El temps"
- 1990 Premi Atlàntida millor suplement cultural diari Avui
- 1997 Premi Carles Riba de poesia for Game over
- 1999 Premi Joan Crexells de narrativa for El cel de l'infern
- 2001 Premi Sant Jordi de novel·la for No miris enrere
- 2005 Premi Atlàntida millor articulista de l'any en llengua catalana
- 2006 Premi Cadaqués al millor poemari de l'any for Esquena nua
- 2006 Italian Tratti Poetry Prize for Il presente abandonatto
- 2010 Premi Atlàntida millor suplement cultural diari El Punt Avui

== Notes ==
- "David Castillo i Buïls". lletrA-UOC – Open University of Catalonia.
