= Blai Bonet =

Mallorcan writer and poet (1926–1997)

- Born: Blai Bonet i Rigo; 1926; Santayí
- Died: 1997 (aged 70–71); Mallorca
- Occupations: Writer and poet
- Notable work: El Mar

Blai Bonet (1926 – 1997) was a Mallorcan poet, novelist and art critic.

Bonet released El Mar (The Sea) in 1958. In 1962, his collections of poems L'Evangeli segons un de tants (The Gospel According to One of Many) was awarded the Carles Riba Poetry Prize, but it was not published due to Spanish Francoist censorship, delaying it for more than five years. In 1990, he was awarded the Creu de Sant Jordi by the Catalan Government.

He was a member of the Association of Catalan Language Writers. He was a participant in the resurgence of Catalan literature in the 1960s.

== Works ==
=== Poetry ===
- Quatre poemes de Setmana Santa (1950)
- Entre el coral i l'espiga (1952)
- Cant espiritual (1953, Óssa Menor Prize)
- Comèdia (1968, Premi de la Crítica 1969)
- L'Evangeli segons un de tants (1967, Carles Riba Poetry Prize 1965)
- Els fets (1974)
- Has vist, algun cop, Jordi Bonet a ca n'Amat a l'ombra? (1976)
- Cant de l'arc (1979)
- El poder i la verdor (1981)
- Teatre del gran verd (1983)
- El jove (1987, Premi Lletra d'Or, Premi Nacional de la Crítica i de Poesia by Generalitat de Catalunya)
- Nova York (1991, Premi Ciutat de Barcelona 1992)
- Sonets (2000)

=== Novel ===
- El mar (1958, Premi Joanot Martorell 1956) published in English by Dalkey Archive Press
- Haceldama (1959)
- Judes i la primavera (1963, Premi Ciutat de Barcelona)
- Míster Evasió (1969)
- Si jo fos fuster i tu et diguessis Maria (1972)
